= 2026 Georgia gubernatorial election =

- November 3, 2026
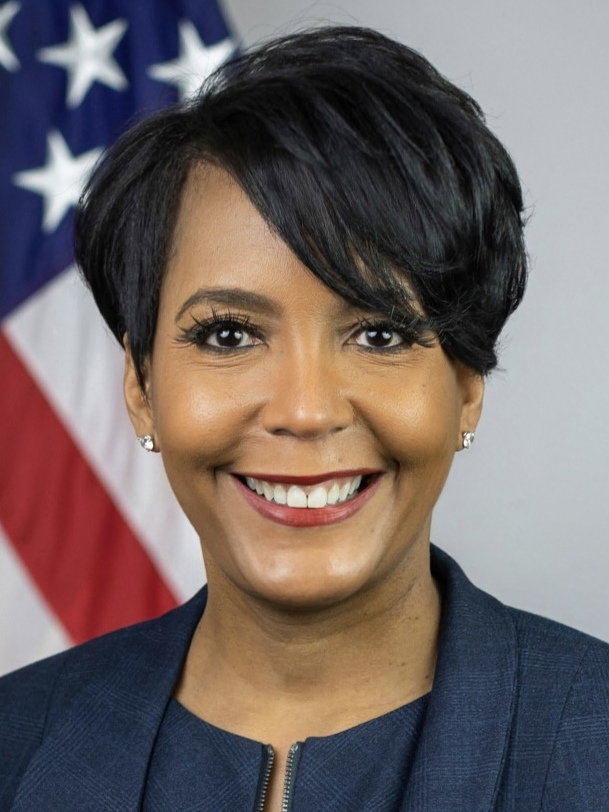

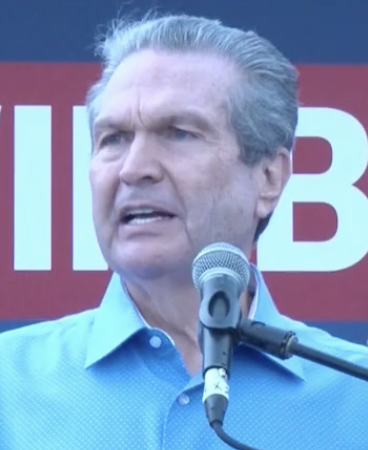
Nominee	Keisha Lance Bottoms	Rick Jackson
Party	Democratic	Republican
Popular vote	2,273,918	1,910,926
Percentage	54.33%	45.65%
- Bottoms: 50–60% 60–70% 70–80% 80–90% Jackson: 50–60% 60–70% 70–80% 80–90% >90%
Governor before election
Brian Kemp
Republican
Elected Governor
Keisha Lance Bottoms
Democratic

The 2026 Georgia gubernatorial election took place in the US state on November 3, 2026, to elect the governor of Georgia. Keisha Lance Bottoms, a Democrat and former Atlanta Mayor, defeated Republican billionaire businessman Rick Jackson.

Primary elections were held on May 19, 2026, with a primary runoff held on June 16. Jackson and incumbent Lieutenant Governor Burt Jones received the most votes in the first round of the Republican primary, but failed to reach the 50% threshold, causing a runoff which Jackson won. Jackson's campaign was predominantly self-funded, managing to overcome endorsements for Jones from President Donald Trump and outgoing governor Brian Kemp. Bottoms won the Democratic nomination without a runoff against six other candidates.

This race was expected to be highly competitive due to the state's nearly even partisan lean and Bottoms' perceived poor electability. Most polling showed the two candidates within the margin of error. However, in the midst of a historic Democratic wave nationwide, Keisha Lance Bottoms unexpectedly pulled away on election night and won by a comfortable 8.6% margin, the largest for a Democrat since 1986 and much to her own surprise. Along with her victory, Democrats won every other statewide office in Georgia on the same ballot. Bottoms is the first woman and first African-American to be elected governor of Georgia. Bottoms will be the first African-American woman to be governor of any U.S. state. She is the first Democrat to be elected governor of Georgia since Roy Barnes in 1998.

== Republican primary ==
=== Candidates ===
Incumbent Republican governor Brian Kemp was ineligible to seek re-election to a third consecutive term. With Kemp term-limited, speculation mounted about Lieutenant Governor Burt Jones, Secretary of State Brad Raffensperger, and Attorney General Chris Carr. Carr and Raffensperger sought to associate themselves with Kemp, drawing on his relative popularity. Jones sought to ally himself with Trump, who endorsed him in August 2025.

Rick Jackson, a healthcare CEO, announced his campaign in February 2026. Previously unknown in the political realm, Jackson quickly consolidated support from right-wing primary voters, in part due to his significant personal financial resources. Jackson spent more than $83 million in personal funds during the primary. Jackson's campaign emphasized his success as a self-made billionaire, highlighting his impoverished childhood. Jackson also sought to tie himself to Trump, claiming he would be "Trump's favorite governor" and "just like Trump, but with a Southern tone." An aggressive television ad campaign allowed Jackson to take a small polling lead by spring 2026. Jackson's self-funding represented the largest amount any candidate had ever spent in a primary race for Georgia governor.

Jones's campaign focused primarily on rural connections, Trump, and support from Republican allies in the General Assembly. Jones accused Jackson of "[making] his fortune recruiting for Planned Parenthood" and funding Transgender surgery for minors. Jackson denied these accusations and filed for defamation against Jones, a lawsuit he later dropped.

==== Nominee ====
- Rick Jackson, healthcare executive

==== Eliminated in runoff ====
- Burt Jones, lieutenant governor of Georgia (2023–present)

==== Eliminated in primary ====
- Chris Carr, attorney general of Georgia (2016–present) (endorsed Jackson in runoff)
- Clark Dean, real estate executive
- Gregg Kirkpatrick, entrepreneur
- Brad Raffensperger, Georgia secretary of state (2019–present)
- Tom Williams, retired software engineer
- Ken Yasger, member of the Georgia Army National Guard, Former United States Army Ranger

==== Declined ====
- Andrew Clyde, U.S. representative from GA-09 (2021–present) (running for re-election)
- Marjorie Taylor Greene, U.S. representative from GA-14 (2021–2026)

=== Endorsements ===
Chris Carr (eliminated)

Statewide officials

- ~~Nathan Deal, former governor of Georgia (2011–2019)~~ (later endorsed Rick Jackson)

Local officials

- 53 county sheriffs
Rick Jackson

U.S. representatives

- Newt Gingrich, former speaker of the House (1995–1999) from GA-06 (1979–1999)

Statewide officials

- John F. King, insurance commissioner of Georgia (2019–present)
- Bubba McDonald, Georgia public service commissioner from the 4th district (1998–2003, 2008–present)

State legislators

- Jan Jones, speaker pro tempore of the Georgia House of Representatives (2010–present) from HD-47 (2013–present)
- 2 state representatives (Note: Bethany Ballard, HD-147 (2023–present); Steven Sainz, HD-180 (2019–present))

Individuals

- Fran Tarkenton, former NFL quarterback

Organizations

- Job Creators Network
Burt Jones

Executive branch officials

- ~~Donald Trump, president of the United States (2017–2021, 2025–present)~~ (later endorsed Rick Jackson)

U.S. representatives

- Rick Allen, GA-12 (2015–present)
- Andrew Clyde, GA-09 (2021–present)
- Clay Fuller, GA-14 (2026–present)
- Brian Jack, GA-03 (2025–present)
- Austin Scott, GA-08 (2011–present)

State legislators

- Jason Anavitarte, majority leader of the Georgia Senate (2025–present) from SD-31 (2021–present)
- John F. Kennedy, former president pro tempore of the Georgia State Senate (2023–2025) from SD-18 (2015–2025)
- Larry Walker III, president pro tempore of the Georgia Senate (2026–present) from SD-20 (2015–present)
- 24 other state senators (Note: John Albers, SD-56 (2011–present); Lee Anderson, SD-24 (2017–present); Tim Bearden, SD-30 (2024–present); Matt Brass, SD-28 (2017–present); Max Burns, SD-23 (2021–present); Clint Dixon, SD-45 (2021–present); Greg Dolezal, SD-27 (2019–present); Drew Echols, SD-49 (2025–present); Steve Gooch, SD-51 (2011–present); Russ Goodman, SD-08 (2021–present); Marty Harbin, SD-16 (2015–present); Bo Hatchett, SD-50 (2021–present); Billy Hickman, SD-04 (2020–present); Mike Hodges, SD-03 (2023–present); Chuck Hufstetler, SD-52 (2013–present); Kay Kirkpatrick, SD-32 (2017–present); Steven McNeel, SD-18 (2026–present); Randy Robertson, SD-29 (2019–present); Shawn Still, SD-48 (2023–present); Carden Summers, SD-13 (2020–present); Blake Tillery, SD-19 (2017–present); Ben Watson,SD-01 (2015–present); Sam Watson, SD-11 (2023–present); Rick Williams, SD-25 (2023–present))
- 38 state representatives (Note: Victor Anderson, HD-10 (2021–present); James Burchett, HD-176 (2019–present); Beth Camp, HD-135 (2021–present); Charles Cannon, HD-172 (2023–present); Mike Cheokas, HD-138 (2005–2017, 2019–present); David Clark, HD-100 (2015–present); Clint Crowe, HD-110 (2021–present); Buddy DeLoach, HD-167 (1995–2005, 2021–present); Robert Dickey, HD-134 (2011–present); Emory Dunahoo, HD-31 (2011–present); Ginny Ehrhart, HD-36 (2019–present); Tim Fleming, HD-114 (2023–present); Lehman Franklin, HD-160 (2023–present); Gerald Greene, HD-154 (1983–present); Lee Hawkins, HD-27 (2013–present); Justin Howard, HD-71 (2025–present); Rick Jasperse, HD-11 (2010–present); Todd Jones, HD-25 (2017–present); Noelle Kahaian, HD-81 (2025–present); John LaHood, HD-175 (2018–present); Eddie Lumsden, HD-12 (2013–present); Reynaldo Martinez, HD-111 (2023–present); Danny Mathis, HD-133 (2019–present); Karen Mathiak, HD-82 (2017–present); Mark Newton, HD-127 (2017–present); Jesse Petrea, HD-166 (2015–present); Alan Powell, HD-33 (1991–present); Trey Rhodes, HD-120 (2015–2023); Gary Richardson, HD-125 (2024–present); Jason Ridley, HD-06 (2017–present); Devan Seabaugh, HD-34 (2021–present); Ed Setzler, former HD-35 (2005–2023); Lynn Smith, HD-70 (1997–present); Tyler Smith, HD-18 (2021–present); Ron Stephens, HD-164 (1997–present); Steve Tarvin, HD-02 (2014–present); Dale Washburn, HD-144 (2019–present); Marcus Wiedower, former HD-121 (2019–2025); Bruce Williamson, HD-112 (2011–present); Noel Williams Jr., HD-148 (2019–present))

Individuals

- Jason Aldean, singer
- Mark Richt, former head football coach at the University of Georgia

Organizations

- Turning Point Action
- Veterans for America First

=== Fundraising ===
Italics indicate a candidate that has either withdrawn from the race, declined to run, or been eliminated in the primary.

Campaign finance reports as of April 30, 2026
Candidate	Raised	Spent	Cash on hand
Chris Carr (R)	$5,324,601	$4,168,947	$1,117,682
Burt Jones (R)*	$4,408,079	$18,035,637	$3,350,140
Brad Raffensperger (R)*	$1,102,127	$4,570,050	$2,532,076
Rick Jackson (R)	$83,495,513	$65,672,560	$17,649,980
Clark Dean (R)	$393,763	$318,155	$75,607
Ken Yasger (R)	$5,791	$946	$4,845
Source: Georgia Campaign Finance Commission

Asterisk indicates loans or previous campaign account balances.

=== Polling ===
Aggregate polls

Source of poll aggregation	Dates administered	Dates updated	Chris Carr	Rick Jackson	Burt Jones	Brad Raffensperger	Other/Undecided (Note: Calculated by taking the difference of 100% and all other candidates combined.)	Margin
270toWin	April 29 – May 5, 2026	May 11, 2026	7.2%	28.3%	24.8%	14.0%	25.7% (Note: Clark Dean with 0.6%)	Jackson +3.5%
Decision Desk HQ	through May 2, 2026	May 11, 2026	7.2%	28.6%	24.9%	14.0%	25.3%	Jackson +3.7%
RealClearPolitics	February 28 – May 2, 2026	May 11, 2026	6.3%	26.2%	24.0%	14.2%	29.3%	Jackson +2.2%
Average			6.9%	27.7%	24.6%	14.1%	26.8%	Jackson +3.1%

Poll source	Date(s) administered	Sample size (Note: Key: A – all adults RV – registered voters LV – likely voters V – unclear)	Margin of error	Chris Carr	Rick Jackson	Burt Jones	Brad Raffensperger	Other	Undecided
InsiderAdvantage (R)	May 16–17, 2026	800 (LV)	± 3.5%	10%	31%	27%	16%	4% (Note: Gregg Kirkpatrick with 2%; Clark Dean and LeLand Olinger with 1%; Ken Yasger with 0%)	12%
Quantus Insights (R)	April 28 – May 2, 2026	1,677 (LV)	± 2.7%	8%	27%	22%	14%	15% (Note: Clark Dean with 1% and Ken Yasger with 1%; Gregg Kirkpatrick and Tom Williams with a combined 1%; "I have no interest/will not vote in Republican primary races" with 12%)	14%
Remington Research Group (R)	April 28–29, 2026	815 (LV)	± 3.3%	5%	29%	28%	14%	–	24%
University of Georgia (Note: Poll sponsored by The Atlanta Journal-Constitution)	April 18–26, 2026	1,000 (LV)	± 3.1%	3%	27%	25%	14%	–	31%
yes. every kid.	April 22–24, 2026	603 (LV)	± 4.0%	10%	32%	26%	12%	1% (Note: Dean with 1%)	19%
Cygnal (R) (Note: Poll sponsored by the Democracy Defense Project)	April 22–23, 2026	600 (LV)	± 4.0%	6%	27%	24%	12%	1%	30%
InsiderAdvantage (R)	April 22–23, 2026	800 (LV)	± 3.5%	6%	32%	25%	11%	3%	23%
JMC Analytics	March 7–8, 2026	560 (LV)	± 4.1%	4%	37%	22%	11%	<1% (Note: Clark Dean, Gregg Kirkpatrick, Tom Williams, and Ken Yasger with <1%)	25%
Emerson College (Note: Poll sponsored by Nexstar Media)	February 28 – March 2, 2026	453 (LV)	± 4.6%	6%	20%	21%	11%	4% (Note: Gregg Kirkpatrick and Leland Olinger II with 2%; Ken Yasger with 1%)	38%
Quantus Insights (R)	February 17–18, 2026	1,337 (LV)	± 3.0%	5%	33%	17%	8%	–	37%
Rasmussen Reports (R)	February 11–12, 2026	1,022 (LV)	± 3.0%	10%	22%	16%	18%	34%	
co/efficient (R)	February 8–9, 2026	1,123 (LV)	± 3.2%	3%	24%	16%	9%	6% (Note: "Someone else" with 4%; Gregg Kirkpatrick with 1%; Clark Dean with 1%)	42%
Cygnal (R)	February 5–6, 2026	600 (LV)	± 4.0%	7%	16%	22%	10%	–	45%
	February 3, 2026	Jackson enters the race							
InsiderAdvantage (R)/ Rosetta Stone (R)	December 18–19, 2025	1,000 (LV)	± 3.1%	9%	–	24%	14%	4% (Note: Dean with 4%)	49%
University of Georgia	October 15–23, 2025	1,000 (LV)	± 3.1%	7%	–	22%	15%	1%	55%
Quantus Insights (R)	October 13–14, 2025	900 (RV)	± 3.2%	12%	–	32%	15%	3% (Note: Clark Dean with 2%; Ken Yasger with 1%)	38%
20/20 Insight	September 25–28, 2023	245 (LV)	± 6.3%	9%	–	18%	–	–	73%

Hypothetical polling

Marjorie Taylor Greene vs. Burt Jones vs. Brad Raffensperger vs. Chris Carr

Poll source	Date(s) administered	Sample size	Margin of error	Chris Carr	Burt Jones	Brad Raffersperger	Marjorie Taylor Greene	Other	Undecided
yes. every kid. (D)	July 22–23, 2025	608 (LV)	± 4.0%	11%	18%	13%	22%	1% (Note: "Someone else/Other" with 1%)	35%

=== Results ===
Primary results by county: Jones: 20–30%; 30–40%; 40–50%; 50–60%; 60–70%; 70–80%; Jackson: 30–40%; 40–50%; 50–60%; Raffensperger: 30–40%; Tie: 30–40%

Jones won a plurality of the vote at 38.4%, winning most rural counties. Jackson came second at 32.5%, drawing strong support from the north Atlanta suburbs. Raffensperger came in third and won DeKalb County. The lack of a majority meant that a runoff was held on June 16.

Republican primary results
Party	Candidate	Votes	%
Republican	Burt Jones	358,184	38.4
Republican	Rick Jackson	303,621	32.5
Republican	Brad Raffensperger	140,085	15.0
Republican	Chris Carr	110,720	11.9
Republican	Clark Dean	7,051	0.8
Republican	Gregg Kirkpatrick	5,537	0.6
Republican	Ken Yasger	4,770	0.5
Republican	Thomas Williams	3,849	0.4
Total votes		933,817	100.00

=== Runoff ===
==== Endorsements ====
Rick Jackson

U.S. senators

- Ted Cruz, Texas (2013–present)
- Rick Scott, Florida (2019–present)

Statewide officials

- Chris Carr, attorney general of Georgia (2016–present) and former candidate for this race
Burt Jones

Statewide officials

- Brian Kemp, governor of Georgia (2019–present)

==== Polling ====
Poll source	Date(s) administered	Sample size	Margin of error	Rick Jackson	Burt Jones	Undecided
InsiderAdvantage (R)	June 15, 2026	800 (LV)	± 3.5%	48%	47%	5%
InsiderAdvantage (R)	June 13–14, 2026	800 (LV)	± 3.31%	49%	46%	5%
Cygnal (R)	June 5–7, 2026	— (LV)	—	56%	44%	—
JMC Analytics (R)	May 26–27, 2026	600 (LV)	± 4.0%	45%	43%	12%
Cygnal (R)	May 21–24, 2026	— (LV)	—	50%	50%	—
InsiderAdvantage (R)	May 20–21, 2026	800 (LV)	± 3.5%	42%	48%	10%
Quantus Insights (R)	May 20, 2026	782 (LV)	± 3.9%	44%	46%	9%

==== Results ====
Runoff results by county: Jackson: 50–60%; 60–70%; Jones: 50–60%; 60–70%; 70–80%; 80–90%

Jackson won the runoff by a 5-point margin, despite Kemp endorsing Jones two days before the vote. With the Democratic primary already over, focus shifted to the candidates' ability to counter Keisha Lance Bottoms. Jackson had consistently attacked Bottoms's record as mayor since he launched his campaign.

In the previous two occasions (2018 and 2010) where the Republican primary did not feature an incumbent governor, the plurality-winner in the primary went on to lose the primary runoff. This trend repeated itself in 2026.

Republican primary runoff results
Party	Candidate	Votes	%
Republican	Rick Jackson	373,543	52.6
Republican	Burt Jones	336,011	47.4
Total votes		709,554	100.0

== Democratic primary ==
=== Candidates ===
==== Nominee ====
- Keisha Lance Bottoms, former director of the Office of Public Engagement (2022–2023) and former mayor of Atlanta (2018–2022)

==== Eliminated in primary ====
- Olujimi Brown, church founder
- Amanda Duffy, accountant
- Geoff Duncan, former Republican lieutenant governor of Georgia (2019–2023)
- Jason Esteves, former state senator from the 35th district (2023–2025)
- Derrick Jackson, state representative (2017–2023, 2023–present) and candidate for lieutenant governor in 2022
- Mike Thurmond, former DeKalb County CEO (2017–2025), former Georgia Labor Commissioner (1999–2011), and nominee for U.S. Senate in 2010

==== Withdrawn ====
- Ruwa Romman, state representative from the 97th district (2023–present) (running for state senate)

==== Declined ====
- Stacey Abrams, former minority leader of the Georgia House of Representatives (2011–2017) and nominee for governor in 2018 and 2022
- Jason Carter, former state senator from the 42nd district (2010–2015), grandson of former governor and president Jimmy Carter, and nominee for governor in 2014 (endorsed Esteves)
- Lucy McBath, U.S. representative from Georgia's 6th congressional district (2019–present)

=== Endorsements ===
Geoff Duncan

State legislators

- 2 state representatives (Note: Michelle Au, HD-50 (2023–present); Pat Gardner, HD-57 (2001–2021))

Individuals

- James Woodall, former president of the Georgia NAACP (2019–2021)

Labor unions

- IBEW Local 613
- Southern Regional Council of Carpenters
Jason Esteves

Executive branch officials

- Sally Yates, former deputy attorney general (2015–2017)

State legislators

- 8 state senators (Note: Jason Carter, former SD-42 (2010–2015); Sally Harrell, SD-40 (2019–present); Kim Jackson, SD-41 (2021–present); Donzella James, SD-35 (1994–2002, 2009–present); RaShaun Kemp, SD-38 (2025–present); Nan Orrock, SD-36 (2007–present); Elena Parent, SD-42 (2015–present); Freddie Powell Sims, SD-12 (2009–present))
- 7 state representatives (Note: Bryce Berry, HD-56 (2025–present); Saira Draper, HD-90 (2023–present); Scott Holcomb, HD-101 (2011–present); Karen Lupton, HD-83 (2023–present); Phil Olaleye, HD-59 (2023–present); Shea Roberts, HD-52 (2021–present); Long Tran, HD-80 (2023–present))

Local officials

- Doug Shipman, former president of the Atlanta City Council (2022–2026)
- Ted Terry, DeKalb County commissioner from the 6th district (2021–present)

Labor unions

- AFSCME Local 1644
- SEIU Workers United Southern Region
- Teamsters Local 528
- UNITE HERE Local 23

Organizations

- End Citizens United
- Georgia Conservation Voters
- Georgia Equality
- Latino Victory Fund
Keisha Lance Bottoms

Executive branch officials

- Joe Biden, former president of the United States (2021–2025)

Statewide officials

- Gavin Newsom, governor of California (2019–present)

State legislators

- Nadine Thomas, former SD-10 (1993–2005)

Local officials

- Burrell Ellis, former DeKalb County CEO (2009–2017)

Labor unions

- American Federation of Government Employees

Organizations

- EMILYs List

Individuals

- Killer Mike, rapper
Michael Thurmond

Statewide officials

- Roy Barnes, former governor of Georgia (1999–2003)

Local officials

- Andrew Young, former mayor of Atlanta (1982–1990)

=== Fundraising ===
Campaign finance reports as of April 30, 2026
Candidate	Raised	Spent	Cash on hand
Keisha Lance Bottoms (D)	$2,869,146	$2,549,686	$257,336
Olujimi Brown (D)	$139,566	$79,939	$59,626
Jason Esteves (D)	$2,907,598	$2,067,240	$773,461
Derrick Jackson (D)	$128,504	$206,723	$83,780
Mike Thurmond (D)	$883,112	$929,503	$421,132
Geoff Duncan (D)	$1,739,846	$1,328,597	$867,783
Source: Georgia Campaign Finance Commission

=== Polling ===
Aggregate polls

Source of poll aggregation	Dates administered	Dates updated	Derrick Jackson	Geoff Duncan	Jason Esteves	Keisha Lance Bottoms	Michael Thurmond	Undecided	Margin
270toWin	May 1–4, 2026	May 5, 2026	1.0%	8.0%	6.5%	45.5%	13.0%	26.0%	Bottoms +32.5%

Poll source	Date(s) administered	Sample size	Margin of error	Geoff Duncan	Jason Esteves	Keisha Lance Bottoms	Michael Thurmond	Other	Undecided
University of Georgia	April 23–29, 2026	1,000 (LV)	± 3.1%	7%	8%	39%	10%	1% (Note: Jackson with 1%)	35%
Concord Public Opinion Partners (D) (Note: Poll sponsored by Education Reform Now Advocacy)	March 31 – April 10, 2026	437 (LV)	–	8%	6%	42%	12%	3% (Note: Jackson with 2%; Brown with 1%)	29%
Concord Public Opinion Partners (D)	March 31 – April 10, 2026	437 (LV)	–	–	–	56%	22%	–	22%
Concord Public Opinion Partners (D)	March 31 – April 10, 2026	437 (LV)	–	16%	–	60%	–	–	24%
Concord Public Opinion Partners (D)	March 31 – April 10, 2026	437 (LV)	–	–	16%	60%	–	–	24%
20/20 Insight (Note: Poll sponsored by Democratic secretary of state candidate Penny Brown Reynolds' campaign)	March 19–24, 2026	575 (LV)	± 4.1%	12%	14%	32%	11%	–	30%
Emerson College	February 28 – March 2, 2026	464 (LV)	± 4.5%	13%	4%	35%	7%	3% (Note: Jackson with 3%; Brown with <1%)	39%
University of Georgia	October 13–21, 2025	1,000 (LV)	± 3.1%	5%	3%	40%	11%	2% (Note: Brown with 1%; Romman with 1%)	39%
Frederick Polls (D) (Note: Poll sponsored by Center for Strong Public Schools Action Fund, a center-left nonprofit organization)	September 23–25, 2025	1,513 (LV)	± 2.5%	17%	10%	43%	25%	4% (Note: Brown with 2%; Jackson with 2%)	–
Public Policy Polling (D) (Note: Poll sponsored by Bottoms's campaign)	September 15–16, 2025	620 (LV)	–	9%	4%	38%	12%	3%	43%

Hypothetical polling

Poll source	Date(s) administered	Sample size	Margin of error	Stacey Abrams	Other	Undecided
20/20 Insight	September 25–28, 2023	247 (LV)	± 6.2%	52%	34%	14%

=== Results ===
Primary results by county: Bottoms: 30–40%; 40–50%; 50–60%; 60–70%; 70–80%; Thurmond: 30–40%

Democratic primary results
Party	Candidate	Votes	%
Democratic	Keisha Lance Bottoms	608,264	56.2
Democratic	Jason Esteves	201,852	18.7
Democratic	Mike Thurmond	139,787	12.9
Democratic	Geoff Duncan	75,721	7.0
Democratic	Derrick Jackson	25,050	2.3
Democratic	Amanda Duffy	18,808	1.7
Democratic	Olujimi Brown	12,329	1.1
Total votes		1,081,811	100.0

== Independents and minor parties ==
=== Libertarian Party ===
==== Candidates ====
===== Withdrawn =====
- Chase Oliver, former chair of the Atlanta Libertarian Party, perennial candidate, and nominee for president in 2024

== General election ==
=== Predictions ===
Source	Ranking	As of
The Cook Political Report	Tossup	October 29, 2026
Decision Desk HQ	Lean D (flip)	November 3, 2026
Fox News	Tossup	November 1, 2026
Inside Elections	Tilt D (flip)	October 29, 2026
NBC News	Tossup	November 3, 2026
RealClearPolitics	Tossup	November 1, 2026
Sabato's Crystal Ball	Lean D (flip)	November 2, 2026
Silver Bulletin	Lean D (flip)	November 3, 2026

=== Post-primary endorsements ===
Rick Jackson (R)

Executive branch officials

- Nick Ayers, former chief of staff to the vice president (2017–2019)
- Donald Trump, president of the United States (2017–2021, 2025–present)
- Sonny Perdue, former secretary of agriculture (2017–2021) and former governor of Georgia (2003–2011)
- Tom Price, former secretary of health and human services (2017)

U.S. representatives

- Buddy Carter, GA-01 (2015–present)
- Lynn Westmoreland, GA-08 (2005–2007); GA-03 (2007–2017)

Statewide officials

- Nathan Deal, former governor of Georgia (2011–2019)
- Tyler Harper, agriculture commissioner of Georgia (2023–present)
- Brian Kemp, governor of Georgia (2019–present)
- Bárbara Rivera Holmes, labor commissioner of Georgia (2025–present)

State legislators

- Josh Bonner, HD-72 (2017–2023), HD-73 (2023–present)
- David Clark, HD-98 (2015–2023), HD-100 (2023–present)
- Brent Cox, HD-28 (2023–present)
- Jaclyn Ford, HD-170 (2025–present)
- Lehman Franklin, HD-160 (2023–present)
- Scott Hilton, HD-95 (2017–2019), HD-48 (2023–present)
- Mike Hodges, SD-3 (2023–present)
- Eric Johnson, HD-153 (1993–1995), SD-1 (1995–2009)
- John Kennedy, SD-18 (2015–2025)
- Trey Kelley, HD-16 (2013–present)
- Lauren McDonald, HD-26 (2021–present)
- Butch Miller, SD-49 (2010–2023)
- Chuck Payne, SD-54 (2017–present)
- Rick Townsend, HD-179 (2023–present)

Local officials

- Mary Norwood, member of the Atlanta City Council (2022–present) (Independent)

Organizations

- Americans for Prosperity
- Georgia Chamber of Commerce
- NRA Political Victory Fund
Keisha Lance Bottoms (D)

Executive branch officials

- Bill Clinton, former president of the United States (1993–2001)
- Eric Holder, former attorney general (2001, 2009–2015)
- Barack Obama, former president of the United States (2009–2017)

U.S. senators

- Jon Ossoff, Georgia (2021–present)
- Raphael Warnock, Georgia (2021–present)

Statewide officials

- Wes Moore, governor of Maryland (2023–present)
- Gretchen Whitmer, governor of Michigan (2019–present)
- Abigail Spanberger, governor of Virginia (2026–present)

State legislators

- Jason Esteves, former SD-35 (2023–2025) and former gubernatorial candidate
- Harold V. Jones II, minority leader of the Georgia Senate (2025–present) from SD-22 (2015–present)

Individuals

- Kerry Washington, actress
- Matthew Yglesias, journalist

Labor unions

- United Auto Workers

Organizations

- Black Economic Alliance
- Democrats for Education Reform
- Everytown for Gun Safety
- Giffords
- Human Rights Campaign
- Jewish Democratic Council of America
- Reproductive Freedom for All
Declined to endorse

Statewide officials

- Burt Jones, lieutenant governor of Georgia (2023–present) and former candidate for this race (Republican)

=== Debates ===
2026 Georgia gubernatorial election debates
No.	Date	Host	Moderator	Link	Republican	Democratic
Key: P Participant A Absent N Not invited I Invited W Withdrawn						
Key: P Participant A Absent N Not invited I Invited W Withdrawn					Jackson	Bottoms
1	October 6, 2026	Atlanta News First; Gray Media	Rick Folbaum	YouTube	P	P

=== Fundraising ===
Campaign finance reports as of October 30, 2026
Candidate	Raised	Spent	Cash on hand
Rick Jackson (R)	$244,143,573 (Note: $194,558,848 self-funded)	$213,135,406	$28,437,370
Keisha Lance Bottoms (D)	$13,331,859	$11,360,724	$855,792
Source: Georgia Campaign Finance Commission

=== Polling ===
Aggregate polls

Source of poll aggregation	Dates administered	Dates updated	Rick Jackson (R)	Keisha Lance Bottoms (D)	Other/ Undecided (Note: Calculated by taking the difference of 100% and all other candidates combined.)	Margin
270toWin	October 7–23, 2026	October 27, 2026	48.8%	47.6%	3.6%	Jackson +1.2%
Decision Desk HQ	through October 27, 2026	October 28, 2026	47.8%	47.8%	4.4%	Tie
FiftyPlusOne	through October 27, 2026	October 28, 2026	48.0%	48.0%	4.0%	Tie
RealClearPolitics	September 14 – October 17, 2026	October 20, 2026	47.8%	46.3%	5.9%	Jackson +1.5%
Silver Bulletin	through October 27, 2026	October 28, 2026	47.7%	47.7%	4.6%	Tie
Average			48.0%	47.4%	4.6%	Jackson +0.6%

Poll source	Date(s) administered	Sample size	Margin of error	Rick Jackson (R)	Keisha Lance Bottoms (D)	Other	Undecided
Research Co.	October 31 – November 2, 2026	450 (LV)	± 4.6%	45%	46%	—	9%
InsiderAdvantage (R)	October 31 – November 2, 2026	2,500 (LV)	± 2.0%	49%	49%	—	2%
State Navigate	October 23–27, 2026	679 (LV)	± 3.8%	47%	50%	2% (Note: "Don't remember" with 2%)	2%
Echelon Insights (R) (Note: Poll conducted for NetChoice)	October 16–23, 2026	508 (LV)	± 5.2%	48%	49%	—	3%
ActiVote	October 6–20, 2026	400 (LV)	± 4.9%	51.5%	48.5%	—	—
Quantus Insights (R)	October 15–17, 2026	755 (LV)	± 3.8%	48%	47%	5%	1%
Quantus Insights (R)	October 15–17, 2026	755 (LV)	± 3.8%	49% (Note: Leaners pushed)	48%	3%	1%
Quantus Insights (R)	October 15–17, 2026	755 (LV)	± 3.8%	51% (Note: Two-way)	49%	–	–
University of Georgia	October 7–15, 2026	1,000 (LV)	± 3.1%	46%	45%	—	8%
InsiderAdvantage (R)	October 12–13, 2026	800 (LV)	± 3.5%	49%	47%	—	4%
InsiderAdvantage (R)	September 22–23, 2026	1,200 (LV)	± 4.0%	48%	46%	—	6%
Big Data Poll (R) (Note: Poll sponsored by the Public Polling Project)	September 21–23, 2026	712 (RV)	± 4.0%	50% (Note: With voters who lean towards a given candidate)	50%	—	—
Big Data Poll (R)	September 21–23, 2026	712 (RV)	± 4.0%	48%	46%	—	7%
Big Data Poll (R)	September 21–23, 2026	678 (LV)	± 4.0%	51%	50%	—	—
Big Data Poll (R)	September 21–23, 2026	678 (LV)	± 4.0%	49%	47%	—	5%
YouGov	September 15–18, 2026	3,414 (RV)	± 2.7%	45%	44%	2% (Note: Someone else" & "I will not vote in this race" with 1%)	9%
YouGov	September 15–18, 2026	3,299 (LV) (Note: Loose likely voters.)	± 2.8%	46%	44%	2%	8%
YouGov	September 15–18, 2026	3,069 (LV) (Note: Strict likely voters.)	± 2.9%	47%	44%	2%	8%
Rasmussen Reports (R)	September 14, 2026	1,019 (LV)	± 3%	48%	45%	—	7%
InsiderAdvantage (R)	August 16–17, 2026	800 (LV)	± 3.4%	46%	46%	—	8%
Quantus Insights (R) (Note: Poll sponsored by the Natural Gas Association of Georgia)	July 29 – August 1, 2026	815 (LV)	± 3.6%	45%	46%	1% (Note: "Another candidate" with 1%)	8%
Fabrizio Ward (R)/Impact Research (D) (Note: Poll commissioned by AARP)	July 13–16, 2026	1,060 (LV)	± 3.0%	46%	48%	—	5%
State Navigate	July 10–13, 2026	448 (LV)	± 4.6%	44%	51%	—	4%
State Navigate	July 10–13, 2026	448 (LV)	± 4.6%	43%	50%	—	7%
Wick	June 27–30, 2026	1,175 (LV)	± 2.9%	43%	43%	—	14%
Beacon Research (D)/Shaw & Co. Research (R) (Note: Poll conducted for Fox News)	June 23–27, 2026	1,002 (RV)	± 3.0%	47%	52%	—	1%
	June 16, 2026	Republican primary runoff					
Concord Public Opinion Partners (D)	May 30 – June 2, 2026	510 (LV)	± 4.3%	38%	53%	—	9%
	May 19, 2026	Primary elections					
Echelon Insights (R) (Note: Poll commissioned by NetChoice)	April 3–9, 2026	407 (LV)	± 6.5%	43%	49%	—	8%

Hypothetical polling

Burt Jones vs. Keisha Lance Bottoms

Poll source	Date(s) administered	Sample size	Margin of error	Burt Jones (R)	Keisha Lance Bottoms (D)	Undecided
Concord Public Opinion Partners (D)	May 30 – June 2, 2026	510 (LV)	± 4.3%	42%	52%	6%
Echelon Insights	April 3–9, 2026	407 (LV)	± 6.5%	43%	49%	8%

Brad Raffensperger vs. Keisha Lance Bottoms

Poll source	Date(s) administered	Sample size	Margin of error	Brad Raffensperger (R)	Keisha Lance Bottoms (D)	Undecided
Echelon Insights	April 3–9, 2026	407 (LV)	± 6.5%	44%	46%	10%

== Results ==
2026 Georgia gubernatorial election
Party	Candidate	Votes	%	±%
Democratic	Keisha Lance Bottoms	2,273,918	54.33	
Republican	Rick Jackson	1,910,926	45.65	
Write-in		810	0.02	
Total votes		4,185,654	100.00	
Democratic gain from Republican				

=== Counties that flipped from Republican to Democratic ===
- Baldwin (largest municipality: Milledgeville)
- Burke (largest municipality: Waynesboro)
- Clay (largest municipality: Fort Gaines)
- Fayette (largest municipality: Peachtree City)
- Houston (largest municipality: Warner Robins)
- Jefferson (largest municipality: Louisville)
- Peach (largest municipality: Fort Valley)
- Sumter (largest municipality: Americus)
- Washington (largest municipality: Sandersville)

==== By congressional district ====
Bottoms won five congressional districts, while Jackson won nine congressional districts.

District	Bottoms	Jackson	Representative elected
1st	46.91%	53.09%	Jim Kingston
2nd	58.35%	41.65%	Sanford Bishop
3rd	39.94%	60.06%	Brian Jack
4th	80.50%	19.50%	Hank Johnson
5th	87.79%	12.21%	Nikema Williams
6th	77.77%	22.23%	Lucy McBath
7th	41.06%	58.94%	Rich McCormick
8th	39.51%	60.49%	Austin Scott
9th	38.64%	61.36%	Andrew Clyde
10th	45.20%	54.80%	Houston Gaines
11th	42.26%	57.74%	John Cowan
12th	47.44%	52.56%	Rick W. Allen
13th	78.34%	21.66%	Jasmine Clark
14th	38.09%	61.91%	Clay Fuller

== Analysis ==
A Republican stronghold during the 2000s and 2010s, Georgia is today considered a swing state at the federal level, a feat attributed to the rapid population growth and diversification of Metro Atlanta. However, the state maintained a Republican lean at the state level, with Republicans holding all statewide executive offices in the 2022 midterms, where incumbent governor Brian Kemp was re-elected in a rematch against Democrat Stacey Abrams by a 7.5 percent margin. Republicans also control both the state senate and House of Representatives, together with Kemp's governorship establishing a government trifecta, alongside an all but one Republican pick on the state's supreme court. A year prior to the 2026 elections, the 2025 Georgia Public Service Commission (PSC) special election resulted in two Democrats being elected to the Commission, both by landslide victories, and marking the first time that Democrats won any seats on the PSC since the 2000 elections or any state-wide non-federal offices since the 2006 elections. Democrats had not won a gubernatorial election in Georgia since 1998.

Bottoms became the first gubernatorial Democratic candidate to win Houston County (home to Warner Robins) since Roy Barnes in 1998; neighboring Peach County since Barnes in 2010; and the fast-growing Metro Atlanta county of Fayette since Joe Frank Harris in 1986.

=== Exit poll ===
2026 Georgia gubernatorial election (CNN)
Demographic subgroup	Bottoms	Jackson	% of total vote
Ideology
Liberals	95	4	22
Moderates	67	32	43
Conservatives	12	88	35
Party
Democrats	98	2	37
Republicans	4	96	34
Independents	56	42	30
Donald Trump job approval
Approve	5	95	38
Disapprove	84	15	61
2024 presidential vote
Kamala Harris	95	4	47
Donald Trump	7	92	45
Another candidate	49	38	1
Did not vote	83	16	5
Gender
Men	49	50	44
Women	57	42	55
Income
$100,000 or more	50	50	38
$50,000-$99,999	55	45	33
Less than $50,000	58	40	29
Race/ethnicity
White	34	65	60
Latino	62	36	5
Black	91	8	28
White born-again or evangelical Christian?
Yes	14	86	26
No	68	31	74
Race by gender
White men	30	69	28
White women	37	62	32
Black men	89	10	12
Black women	93	6	16
Latino men	62	36	2
Latina women	62	35	3
All other voters	63	36	8
Age
18–29 years old	78	21	12
30–44 years old	61	38	21
45–64 years old	51	48	37
65 and older	42	57	29
Area type
Urban	78	20	14
Suburban	61	38	50
Rural	34	65	36
Education
College graduate	59	40	46
No college degree	49	50	54
Education by race
White college graduates	45	54	29
Non-white college graduates	82	18	18
Whites without college	24	75	31
Non-whites without college	82	15	22
Education by gender and race
White women with college degrees	51	48	15
White women without college degrees	25	74	17
White men with college degrees	38	61	14
White men without college degrees	23	77	14
Voters of color	82	16	40
Educational attainment
Advanced degree	64	35	22
Bachelor's degree	55	45	24
Associate's degree	49	49	12
Some college	48	51	20
Never attended college	50	48	23

== Notes ==
Partisan clients

== See also ==
- 2026 United States gubernatorial elections
- 2026 United States Senate election in Georgia
- 2026 Georgia state elections
