= 2026 United States lieutenant gubernatorial elections =

- November 3, 2026

10 lieutenant governorships (Note: Seat tallies and popular vote do not include states that do not elect lieutenant governors separately from governors.)
	Majority party	Minority party
Party	Democratic	Republican
Seats before	6	11
Seats after	10	7
Seat change	▲4	▼4
Seats up	2	8
Seats won	6	4
- Democratic hold Democratic gain Republican hold No election

The 2026 United States lieutenant gubernatorial elections were held on November 3, 2026, in 10 states. The previous lieutenant gubernatorial elections for this group of states took place in 2022, except in Vermont, where lieutenant governors serve two-year terms and elected their lieutenant governor in 2024.

== Partisan composition ==
Going into the election, there are 11 Republican lieutenant governors and 6 Democratic lieutenant governors who are not elected alongside their state's governors. This class of lieutenant governors is made up of 8 Republicans and 2 Democrats. Republicans are defending one lieutenant governorship in a state that Kamala Harris won in 2024 (Vermont), while there are no states with Democratic lieutenant governors which Donald Trump won.

== Retirements ==
Map of retirements: Republican incumbent ran Democratic incumbent ran Republican incumbent term-limited or retired Democratic incumbent term-limited No election

4 incumbent lieutenant governors (3 Republican and 1 Democrat) are retiring. 3 incumbent lieutenant governors (2 Republican and 1 Democrat) are term-limited. 1 incumbent Republican lieutenant governor has announced they are not seeking reelection.

=== Democratic ===
1. California: Eleni Kounalakis is term-limited after 2 terms.

=== Republican ===
1. Alabama: Will Ainsworth is term-limited after 2 terms.
2. Georgia: Burt Jones is retiring to run for governor.
3. Oklahoma: Matt Pinnell is term-limited after 2 terms.

== Race summary ==
State	Lieutenant governor	Party	First elected	Last race	Status	Candidates
Alabama	Will Ainsworth	Republican	2018	83.7% R	Incumbent term-limited. Republican hold.	▌ ✓ John Wahl (Republican); ▌Phillip Ensler (Democratic)
Arkansas	Leslie Rutledge	Republican	2022	64.2% R	Incumbent re-elected.	▌ ✓ Leslie Rutledge (Republican); ▌Michael Kalagias (Libertarian)
California	Eleni Kounalakis	Democratic	2018	59.7% D	Incumbent term-limited. Democratic hold.	▌ ✓ Fiona Ma (Democratic); ▌Gloria Romero (Republican)
Georgia	Burt Jones	Republican	2022	51.4% R	Incumbent retiring to run for governor. Democratic gain.	▌ ✓ Josh McLaurin (Democratic); ▌Greg Dolezal (Republican)
Idaho	Scott Bedke	Republican	2022	64.4% R	Incumbent re-elected.	▌ ✓ Scott Bedke (Republican); ▌Eric Myricks (Democratic)
Nevada	Stavros Anthony	Republican	2022	49.4% R	Incumbent lost re-election. Democratic gain.	▌ ✓ Sandra Jauregui (Democratic); ▌Stavros Anthony (Republican); ▌Janine Hansen (American Independent)
Oklahoma	Matt Pinnell	Republican	2018	61.9% R	Incumbent term-limited. Republican hold.	▌ ✓ T. W. Shannon (Republican); ▌Kelly Forbes (Democratic)
Rhode Island	Sabina Matos	Democratic	2021 (Note: Matos took office after her predecessor, Dan McKee, resigned. She was subsequently elected in 2022.)	50.9% D	Incumbent re-elected.	▌ ✓ Sabina Matos (Democratic); ▌John Loughlin (Republican)
Texas	Dan Patrick	Republican	2014	53.8% R	Incumbent lost re-election. Democratic gain.	▌ ✓ Vikki Goodwin (Democratic); ▌Dan Patrick (Republican); ▌Anthony Cristo (Libertarian); ▌Kevin McCormick (Green)
Vermont	John Rodgers	Republican	2024 (Note: Since no candidate received a majority of the vote, Rodgers was ultimately elected by the Vermont General Assembly on January 9, 2025.)	48.8% R	Incumbent lost re-election. Democratic gain.	▌ ✓ Molly Gray (Democratic); ▌John Rodgers (Republican)

== Alabama ==
Alabama lieutenant gubernatorial election

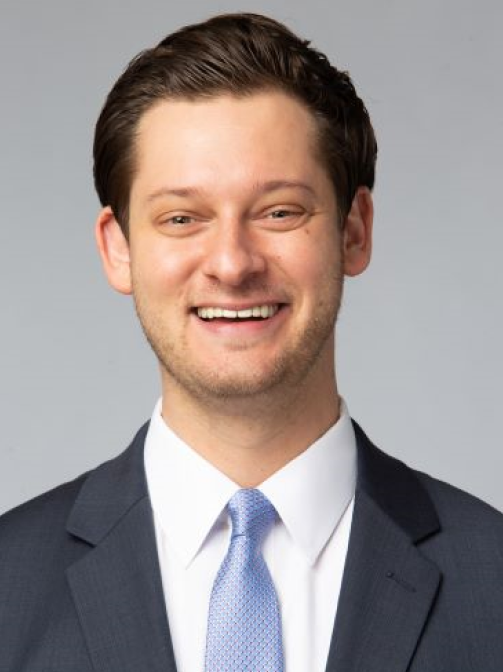
Candidate	John Wahl	Phillip Ensler
Party	Republican	Democratic
- Wahl: 50–60% 60–70% 70–80% 80–90% Ensler: 50–60% 60–70% 70–80% 80–90%
Lieutenant Governor before election
Will Ainsworth
Republican
Elected Lieutenant Governor
John Wahl
Republican

The Alabama Republican primary election is May 19, 2026. Two-term incumbent Republican Will Ainsworth is term-limited and ineligible to run for re-election. Declared Republican candidates include incumbent secretary of state Wes Allen, Cullman County deputy Patrick Bishop, community advocate George Childress, incumbent commissioner of agriculture and industries Rick Pate, physician Stewart Tankersley, economic developer Nicole Wadsworth, and former Alabama Republican Party chair John Wahl. Wahl defeated Allen in the June 16 Primary Runoff to gain the Republican nomination.

State representative Phillip Ensler and funeral company CEO Darryl Perryman are running in the Democratic primary.

== Arkansas ==
Arkansas lieutenant gubernatorial election
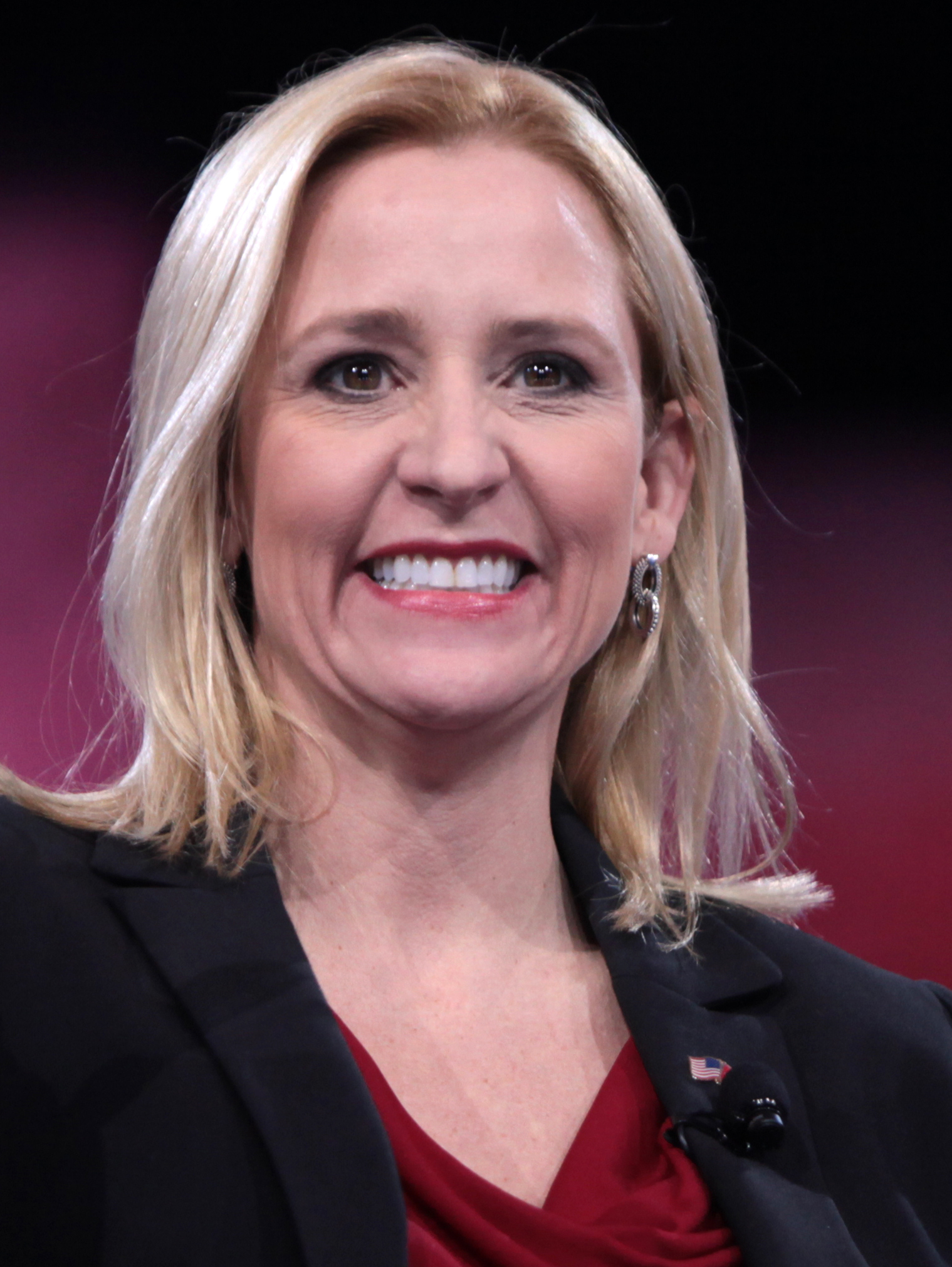

Candidate	Leslie Rutledge	Michael Kalagias
Party	Republican	Libertarian
- Rutledge: 50–60% 60–70% 70–80% 80–90% Kalagias: 50–60%
Lieutenant Governor before election
Leslie Rutledge
Republican
Elected Lieutenant Governor
Leslie Rutledge
Republican

One-term incumbent Republican Leslie Rutledge is seeking re-election.

As the filing deadline passed without any Democratic candidates filing, Rutledge will be opposed in the general election by firefighter and United States Navy veteran Michael Kalagias as the Libertarian nominee.

== California ==
California lieutenant gubernatorial election
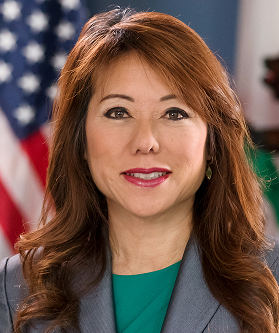

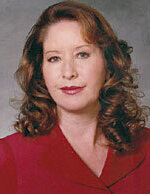
Candidate	Fiona Ma	Gloria Romero
Party	Democratic	Republican
- Ma: 50–60% 60–70% 70–80% 80–90% Romero: 50–60% 60–70% 70–80%
Lieutenant Governor before election
Eleni Kounalakis
Democratic
Elected Lieutenant Governor
Fiona Ma
Democratic

Two-term incumbent Democrat Eleni Kounalakis is term-limited and ineligible to run for re-election. California State Treasurer Fiona Ma and former state senator Gloria Romero secured the top two positions in the June 2 primary to run in the general election to succeed her.

Other notable candidates who ran included Democrats Josh Fryday (chief service officer for governor Gavin Newsom and former mayor of Novato), former mayor of Stockton Michael Tubbs, musician and record producer Tim Myers, and civil rights attorney Oliver Ma (no relation to Fiona Ma), and Republicans David Collenberg (farmer and business owner) and entrepreneur David Fennell.

== Georgia ==
Georgia lieutenant gubernatorial election
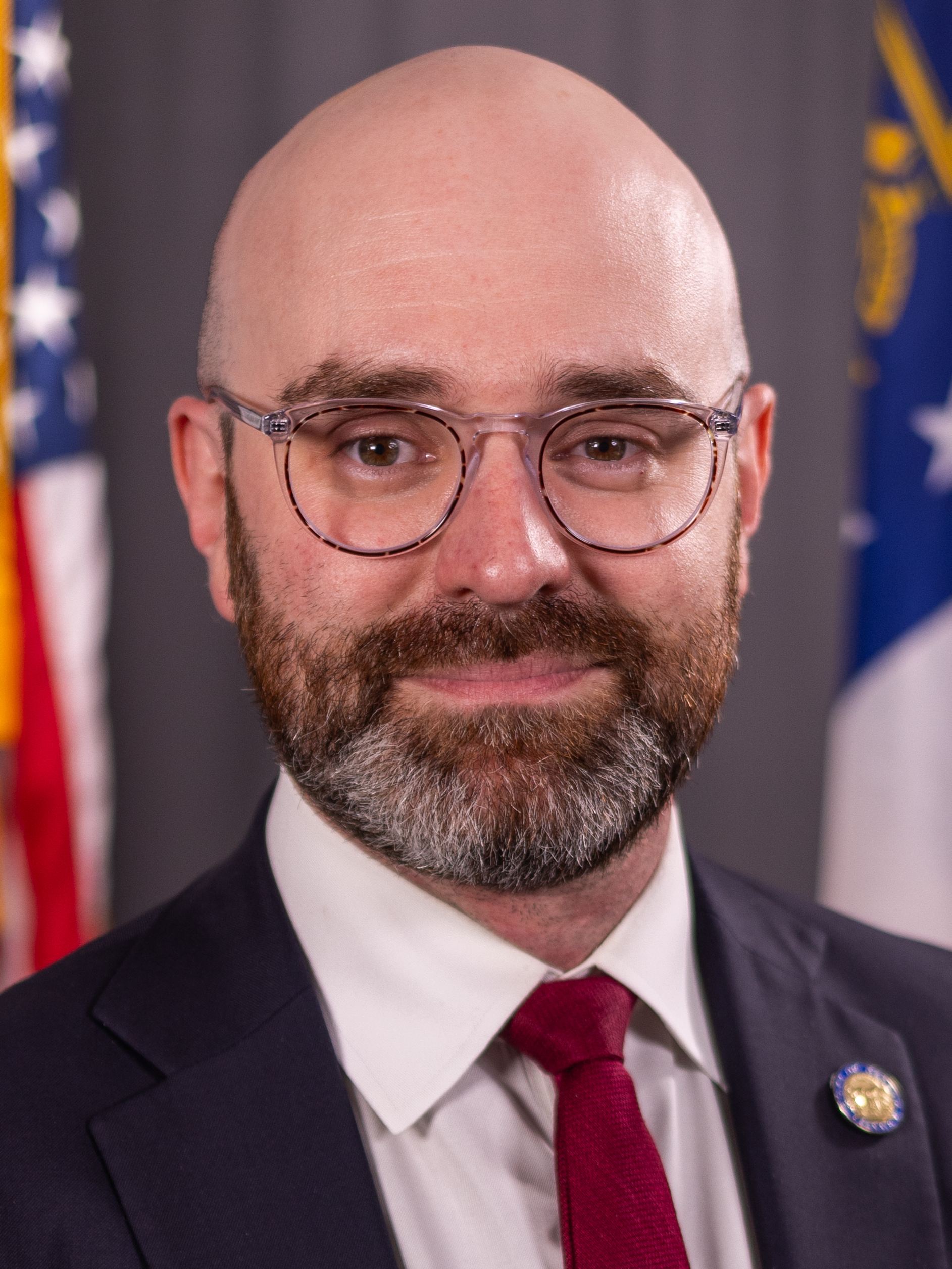

Nominee	Josh McLaurin	Greg Dolezal
Party	Democratic	Republican
- McLaurin: 50–60% 60–70% 70–80% 80–90% 90–100% Dolezal: 50–60% 60–70% 70–80% 80–90% 90–100%
Lieutenant Governor before election
Burt Jones
Republican
Elected Lieutenant Governor
Josh McLaurin
Democratic

One-term incumbent Republican Burt Jones was first elected in 2022 and was eligible to run for re-election. On July 8, 2025, he announced that he would run for governor in 2026 instead of seeking reelection to a second term as lieutenant governor.

The Republican candidates who filed to run included state Representative David Clark, Marine veteran Brenda Nelson-Porter, small business owner Takosha Swan, and state Senators Greg Dolezal, Blake Tillery, Steve Gooch (also majority leader of the Georgia State Senate (2023–2025)) and John F. Kennedy (who had also served as president pro tempore of the Georgia State Senate (2023–2025)). After the June 16 Primary runoff, Dolezal won the nomination over Kennedy.

Democratic candidates who filed included Georgia state Senators Josh McLaurin and Nabilah Parkes as well as accountant Richard Wright. Former Macon mayor pro tempore Seth Clark had initially filed, but withdrew McLaurin won in the Primary runoff over Parkes.

== Idaho ==
Idaho lieutenant gubernatorial election
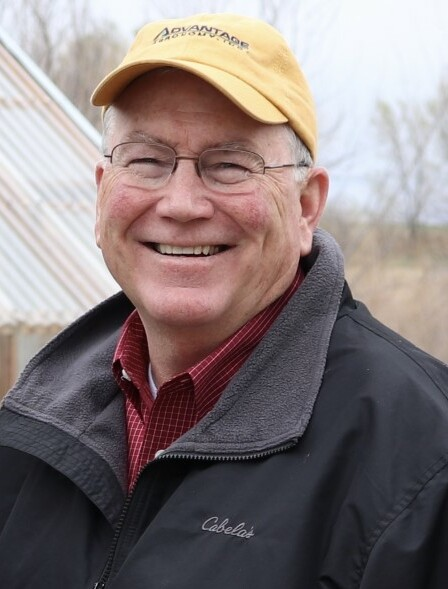

Nominee	Scott Bedke	Eric Myricks
Party	Republican	Democratic
- Bedke: 50–60% 60–70% 70–80% 80–90% Myricks: 60–70%
Lieutenant Governor before election
Scott Bedke
Republican
Elected Lieutenant Governor
Scott Bedke
Republican

One-term incumbent Republican Scott Bedke was first elected in 2022. He is running for re-election. He is being challenged by Democrat Eric Myricks.

== Nevada ==
Nevada lieutenant gubernatorial election

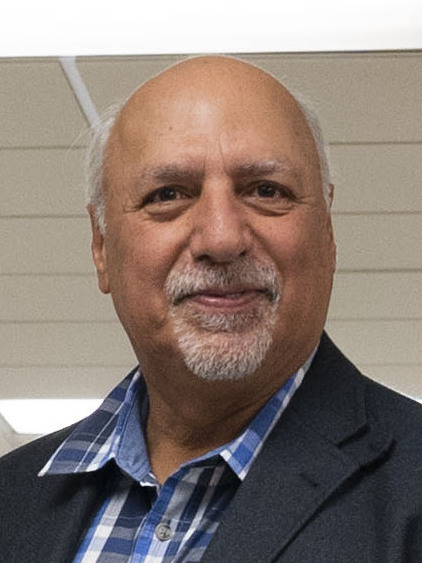
Nominee	Sandra Jauregui	Stavros Anthony
Party	Democratic	Republican
Lieutenant Governor before election
Stavros Anthony
Republican
Elected Lieutenant Governor
Sandra Jauregui
Democratic

One-term incumbent Republican Stavros Anthony was elected in 2022 with 49.41% of the vote. He is running for re-election. Assembly Majority Leader Sandra Jauregui ran in the Democratic primary and won against nurse practitioner Courtney Burke and entertainer BridgieNix Scheiner

== Oklahoma ==
Oklahoma lieutenant gubernatorial election
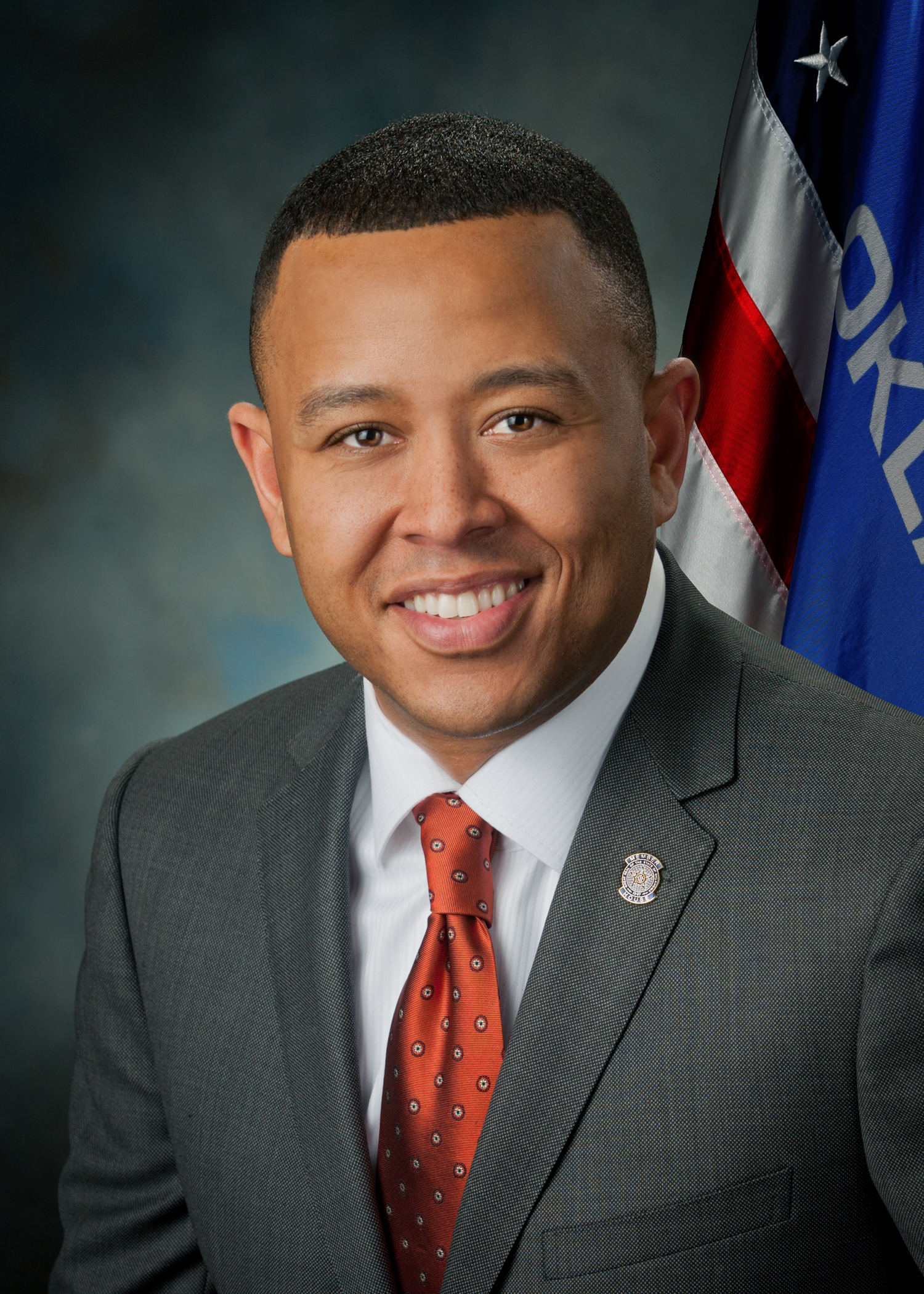

Nominee	T. W. Shannon	Kelly Forbes
Party	Republican	Democratic
Lieutenant Governor before election
Matt Pinnell
Republican
Elected Lieutenant Governor
T. W. Shannon
Republican

Two-term incumbent Republican Matt Pinnell is term-limited and ineligible to run for re-election.

Businessman Victor Flores, state Representatives Brian Hill and Justin Humphrey, businessman and Navy veteran David Ostrowe, State senator Darrell Weaver, and former Speaker of the Oklahoma House of Representatives T. W. Shannon filed for the Republican primary. Shannon won the Republican Primary outright with 54% of the vote.

Consultant and educator Kelly Forbes was unopposed for the Democrat nomination following Navy veteran Candice Jay's withdraw.

== Rhode Island ==
Rhode Island lieutenant gubernatorial election
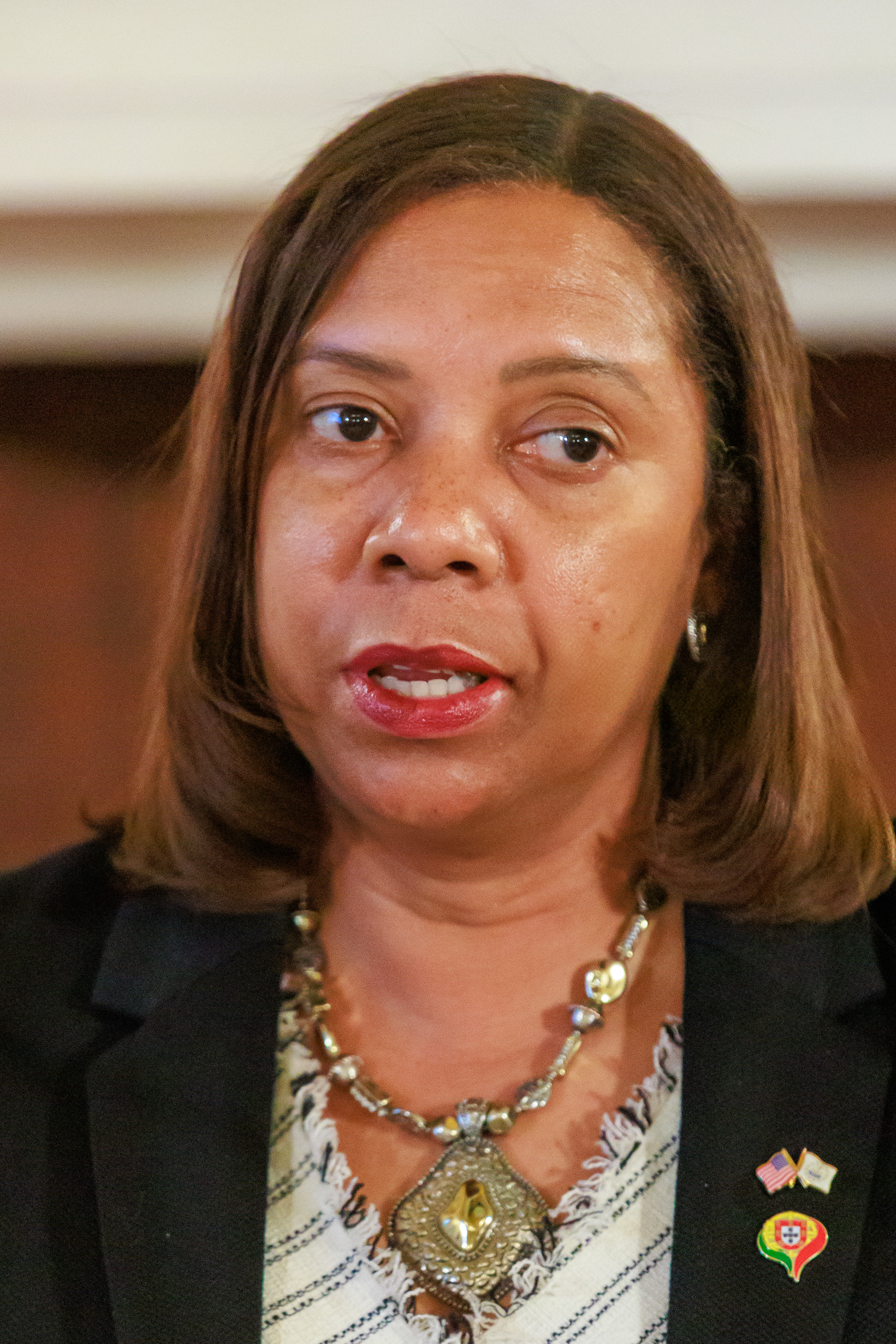

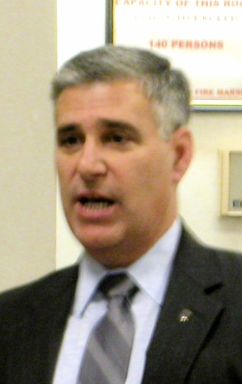
Nominee	Sabina Matos	John Loughlin
Party	Democratic	Republican
Lieutenant Governor before election
Sabina Matos
Democratic
Elected Lieutenant Governor
Sabina Matos
Democratic

One-term incumbent Democrat Sabina Matos was elected in 2022 with 51.2% of the vote. She is running for re-election. Other candidates in the Democratic primary include Providence city councilor Sue AnderBois, former state senator Cynthia Armour Coyne, former mayor of Newport Xay Khamsyvoravong, and teacher, U.S. Air Force veteran, and 2022 Independent candidate for Lieutenant Governor Ross McCurdy. Matos fended off the primary challenge and won the Democratic nomination, receiving 36% of the primary vote.

Former state Representative John Loughlin is the presumptive Republican nominee as no other Republican candidates filed.

== Texas ==
Texas lieutenant gubernatorial election

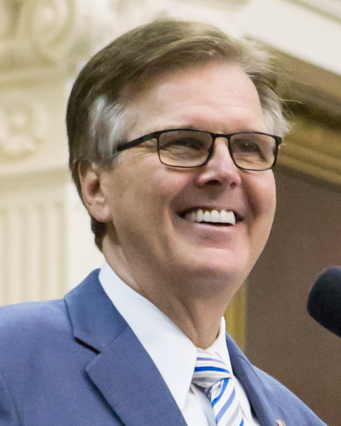
Nominee	Vikki Goodwin	Dan Patrick
Party	Democratic	Republican
Lieutenant Governor before election
Dan Patrick
Republican
Elected Lieutenant Governor
Vikki Goodwin
Democratic

Three-term incumbent Republican Dan Patrick is running for re-election. The Texas Constitution does not have term limits for any statewide office.

Other Republicans who opposed Patrick in the Republican primary were educator Perla Muñoz Hopkins, business consultant Timothy Mabry, and U.S. Air Force veteran Esala Wueschner.

Candidates in the Democratic primary included state representative Vikki Goodwin, contracts and privacy manager Courtney Head, and union representative Marcos Velez Goodwin would defeat Velez in the primary runoff to earn the Democratic nomination.

== Vermont ==
Vermont lieutenant gubernatorial election
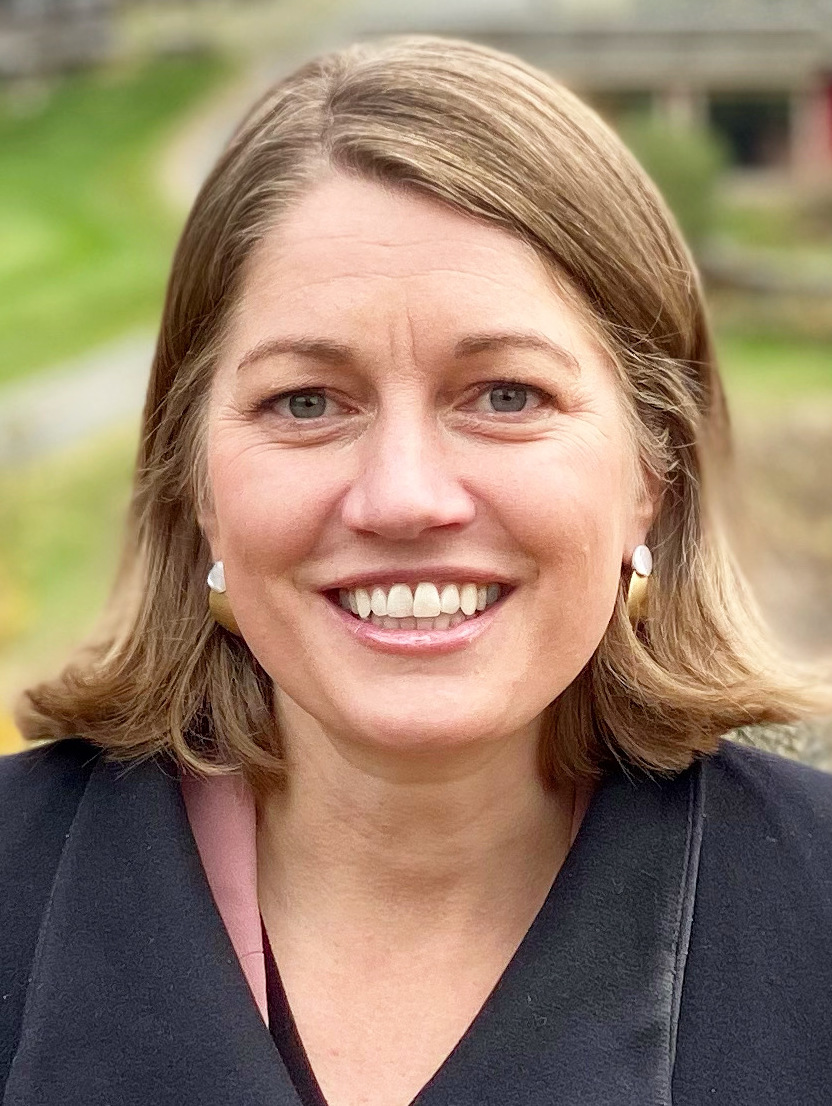

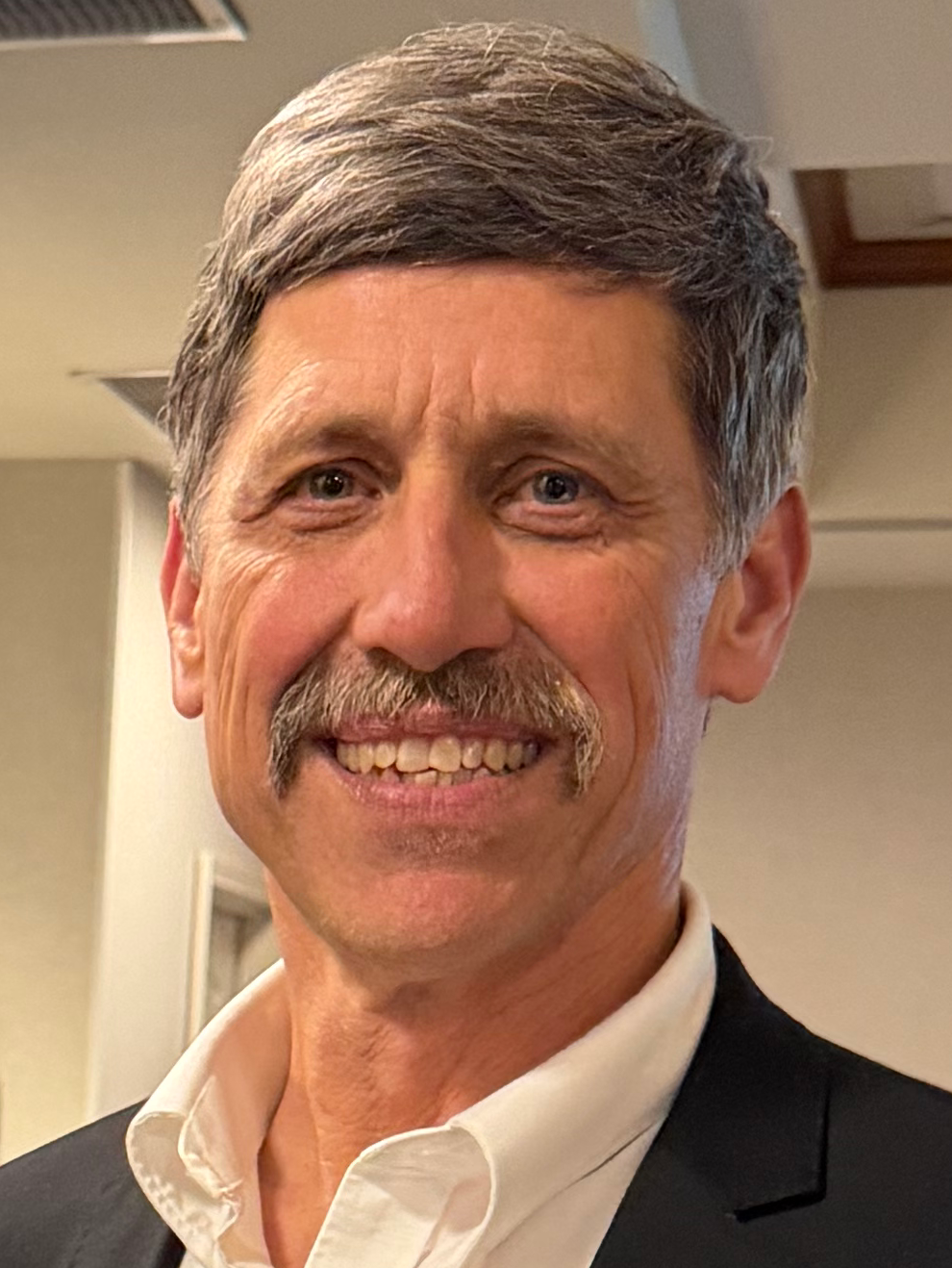
Nominee	Molly Gray	John Rodgers
Party	Democratic	Republican
Lieutenant Governor before election
John Rodgers
Republican
Elected Lieutenant Governor
Molly Gray
Democratic

One-term incumbent Republican John Rodgers was elected in 2024 with 48.76% of the vote. He is running for re-election. Former Democratic Lieutenant Governor Molly Gray will run against him. Other candidates in the Democratic primary include Esther Charlestin (chair of the Vermont Commission on Women) and Democratic National Committee member Ryan McLaren.
