= 2026 Georgia lieutenant gubernatorial election =

- November 3, 2026
- Reporting: 99% as of 11:20 AM EST
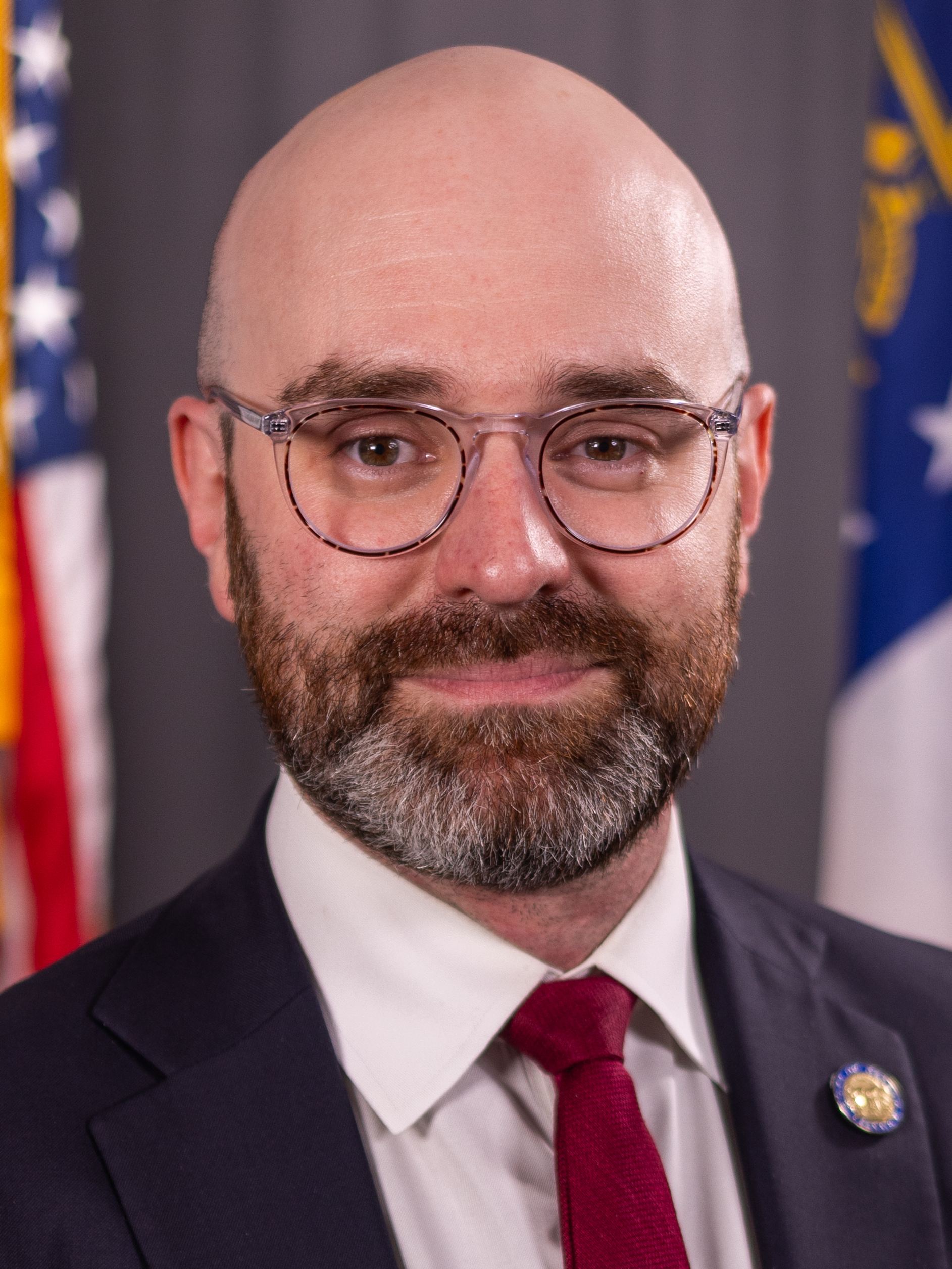

Nominee	Josh McLaurin	Greg Dolezal
Party	Democratic	Republican
Popular vote	2,327,235	1,832,688
Percentage	55.9%	44.1%
- McLaurin: 50–60% 60–70% 70–80% 80–90% >90% Dolezal: 50–60% 60–70% 70–80% 80–90% >90%
Lieutenant Governor before election
Burt Jones
Republican
Elected Lieutenant Governor
Josh McLaurin
Democratic

The 2026 Georgia lieutenant gubernatorial election was held on November 3, 2026, to elect the lieutenant governor of Georgia. Republican incumbent Burt Jones declined to seek a second term, and unsuccessfully ran for governor. Democratic state Senator Josh McLaurin won the general election, defeating Republican nominee Greg Dolezal and becoming the first Democrat elected Lieutenant Governor since 2002.

== Republican primary ==
=== Candidates ===
==== Nominee ====
- Greg Dolezal, state senator from the 27th district (2019–present)

==== Eliminated in runoff ====
- John F. Kennedy, president pro tempore of the Georgia State Senate (2023–2025) from the 18th district (2015–2025) (no relation to President John F. Kennedy)

==== Eliminated in primary ====
- David Clark, state representative from the 100th district (2015–present)
- Steve Gooch, majority leader of the Georgia State Senate (2023–2025) from the 51st district (2011–present)
- Brenda Nelson-Porter, researcher and U.S. Marine
- Takosha Swan, small business owner
- Blake Tillery, state senator from the 19th district (2017–present)

==== Declined ====
- Burt Jones, incumbent lieutenant governor (2023–present) (running for governor)

=== Endorsements ===
Blake Tillery

Local officials

- 62 county sheriffs

=== Fundraising ===
Italics indicate a candidate that has either withdrawn from the race, declined to run, or been eliminated in the primary.

Campaign finance reports as of June 30, 2025
Candidate	Raised	Spent	Cash on hand
Steve Gooch (R)	$1,035,638	$18,443	$1,017,194
John F. Kennedy (R)	$813,349	$3,574	$809,775
Blake Tillery (R)	$759,190	$10,983	$748,206
Source: Georgia Campaign Finance Commission

=== Polling ===
Poll source	Date(s) administered	Sample size (Note: Key: A – all adults RV – registered voters LV – likely voters V – unclear)	Margin of error	David Clark	Greg Dolezal	Steve Gooch	John F. Kennedy	Blake Tillery	Brenda Nelson-Porter	Undecided
Quantus Insights (R)	October 13–14, 2025	900 (RV)	± 3.2%	4%	6%	6%	7%	5%	–	72%
yes. every kid. (D)	July 22–23, 2025	608 (LV)	± 3.97%	2%	3%	4%	20%	5%	2%	65%

=== Results ===
Primary results by county: Kennedy: 20–30%; 30–40%; 40–50%; 50–60%; 60–70%; Dolezal: 20–30%; 30–40%; 40–50%; Tillery: 20–30%; 30–40%; 40–50%; 50–60%; 60–70%; Clark: 20–30%; Gooch: 20–30%; 30–40%; 40–50%; 50–60%; 60–70%

Republican primary
Party	Candidate	Votes	%
Republican	John F. Kennedy	242,708	27.3
Republican	Greg Dolezal	205,454	23.1
Republican	Blake Tillery	169,703	19.1
Republican	David Clark	140,414	15.8
Republican	Steve Gooch	103,621	11.7
Republican	Brenda Nelson-Porter	17,146	1.9
Republican	Takosha Swan	10,053	1.1
Total votes		889,099	100.0

=== Runoff ===
==== Results ====
Runoff results by county: Dolezal: 50–60%; 60–70%; Kennedy: 50–60%; 60–70%

Republican primary runoff
Party	Candidate	Votes	%
Republican	Greg Dolezal	375,012	54.2
Republican	John F. Kennedy	316,900	45.8
Total votes		691,912	100.0

== Democratic primary ==
=== Candidates ===
==== Nominee ====
- Josh McLaurin, state senator from the 14th district (2023–present)

==== Eliminated in runoff ====
- Nabilah Parkes, state senator from the 7th district (2023–2026) and candidate for Georgia’s 7th congressional district in 2020 (previously ran for insurance commissioner)

==== Eliminated in primary ====
- Richard Wright, accountant

==== Withdrawn ====
- Seth Clark, former Macon mayor pro tempore (2021–2026)

=== Endorsements ===
Josh McLaurin

U.S. Senators

- Jon Ossoff, Georgia (2021–present) (endorsed in runoff)
- Raphael Warnock, Georgia (2021–present) (endorsed in runoff)

State legislators

- Stacey Abrams, former state representative from the 84th and 89th districts (2007–2017) (endorsed in runoff)
- Segun Adeyina, state representative from the 110th district (2023–present)
- Arlene Beckles, state representative from the 96th district (2025–present)
- Scott Holcomb, state representative from the 101st district (2025–present) and 81st district (2011–2025)
- Shelly Hutchinson, former state representative from the 106th district (2023–2025) and 107th district (2019-2025)
- Dar'shun Kendrick, state representative from the 95th district (2023–present), 93rd district (2013-2023), and 94th district (2011-2013)
- Marvin Lim, state representative from the 98th district (2023–present) and 99th district (2021-2023)
- Dewey McClain, state representative from the 109th district (2023–present) and 100th district (2013-2023)
- Nikki Merritt, state senator from the 9th district (2021–present)
- Billy Mitchell, state representative from the 88th district (2005–present) and 61st district (2003-2005)
- Elena Parent, state senator from the 44th district (2025–present) and 42nd district (2015–2025)
- Sam Park, state representative from the 107th district (2023–present) and 101st district (2017–present)
- Gabe Okoye, state representative from the 102nd district (2023–present)
- Sheikh Rahman, state senator from the 5th district (2019–present)
- Ruwa Romman, state representative from the 97th district (2023–present)
- Anne Allen Westbrook, state representative from the 163rd district (2023–present)

Local officials

- Van R. Johnson, mayor of Savannah

Organizations

- Fair Fight Action (endorsed in runoff)
- Georgia AFL-CIO
Nabilah Parkes

U.S. representatives

- Hank Johnson, GA-4 (2007–present)

Local officials

- Fani Willis, Fulton County District Attorney (2021–present)
- Shirley Franklin, former mayor of Atlanta (2002–2010)
- Ted Terry, DeKalb County Commissioner (2021–present)

Organizations

- Vote Mama
Seth Clark (withdrawn)

State legislators

- Stacey Evans, state representative from the 57th district (2021–present)
- Tangie Herring, state representative from the 145th district (2025–present)

Local officials

- Kelly Girtz, mayor of Athens (2019–present)

=== Fundraising ===
Campaign finance reports as of June 30, 2025
Candidate	Raised	Spent	Cash on hand
Josh McLaurin (D)	$117,611	$7,233	$110,377
Source: Georgia Campaign Finance Commission

=== Results ===
Primary results by county: McLaurin: 30–40%; 40–50%; 50–60%; 60–70%; Parkes: 30–40%; 40–50%; Wright: 30–40%; 40–50%; 50–60%

Democratic primary
Party	Candidate	Votes	%
Democratic	Josh McLaurin	426,745	41.4
Democratic	Nabilah Parkes	407,199	39.5
Democratic	Richard Wright	196,646	19.1
Total votes		1,030,590	100.0

=== Runoff ===
==== Results ====
Runoff results by county: McLaurin: 50–60%; 60–70%; 70–80%; Parkes: 50–60%; 60–70%; Tie: 50–60%

Democratic primary runoff
Party	Candidate	Votes	%
Democratic	Josh McLaurin	210,842	54.9
Democratic	Nabilah Parkes	173,370	45.1
Total votes		384,212	100.0

== General election ==
=== Post-primary endorsements ===
Josh McLaurin (D)

Labor unions

- United Auto Workers

Organizations

- Everytown for Gun Safety
- Reproductive Freedom for All

=== Polling ===
Poll source	Date(s) administered	Sample size	Margin of error	Greg Dolezal (R)	Josh McLaurin (D)	Undecided
Quantus Insights (R)	October 15–17, 2026	755 (LV)	± 3.8%	47%	47%	6%
Quantus Insights (R)	October 15–17, 2026	755 (LV)	± 3.8%	48% (Note: Leaners pushed)	47%	5%
Quantus Insights (R)	October 15–17, 2026	755 (LV)	± 3.8%	50% (Note: Two-way)	50%	–
State Navigate	July 10–13, 2026	448 (LV)	± 4.6%	44% (Note: With voters who lean towards a given candidate)	48%	9%
State Navigate	July 10–13, 2026	448 (LV)	± 4.6%	39%	43%	18%

=== Results ===
2026 Georgia lieutenant gubernatorial election
Party	Candidate	Votes	%	±%
Republican	Greg Dolezal			
Democratic	Josh McLaurin			
Total votes			100.0	
Democratic gain from Republican				

== See also ==
- 2026 United States lieutenant gubernatorial elections
