= Georgia Freedom Caucus =

US ultra-conservative policial group

- Chair: Charlice Byrd
- Vice Chair: Noelle Kahaian
- Founded: December 2021; 4 years ago
- Ideology: Limited government; Right-wing populism; Trumpism
- Political position: Right-wing to far-right
- National affiliation: State Freedom Caucus Network
- Seats in the House Republican Conference: 2 / 99 (Note: Total representation may not be shown as some members are anonymous)
- Seats in the State House: 2 / 180
- Seats in the Senate Republican Conference: 1 / 31
- Seats in the State Senate: 1 / 56

The Georgia Freedom Caucus is a legislative caucus of Republican members in the Georgia General Assembly that promotes ultra-conservative policies, such as spending and tax reductions, limited government power, and the promotion of a conservative social agenda critical of DEI policies, LGBT+ initiatives, and abortion. It is affiliated with the State Freedom Caucus Network, and modeled after the Freedom Caucus in the U.S. House of Representatives.

== History ==
The Freedom Caucus was created in December 2021 as part of the State Freedom Caucus Network's efforts to create a Freedom Caucus in all state legislatures. President of the Network, Andy Roth, said the Georgia Freedom Caucus would give conservative lawmakers "the resources and the manpower to fight back" against "special interests by the establishment in both parties". The Network provides staffing and political support to its state caucuses.

A key founding member and former Georgia Representative Phillip Singleton said Republican leadership punish "members that don't toe the line" and that the Freedom Caucus will be more willing to bring conservative legislation to the voting floor.

After launching the Caucus, the group hosted a gala featuring former White House Chief of Staff Mark Meadows.

== Political positions and involvement ==
The Caucus seeks to introduce conservative legislation, while blocking legislation (especially those that "increase the size and scope of government and infringes on personal liberties"). It aims to "move outcomes to the political right".

=== Intra-party relationship ===
The Freedom Caucus has a contentious relationship with more moderate House and Senate Republican Caucuses. Two founding members, Singleton and Sen. Burt Jones, claimed the leadership of their respective chambers retaliated against them for dissenting from the party line, calling it a "culture of cancellation". The Caucus represents a more Trumpian, populist conservative compared to the traditional conservative represented by the Republican Caucuses.

Another Caucus member, Senator Colton Moore, was banned from the House by Republican leadership after he called the chamber's former Speaker, fellow Republican David Ralston, "one of the most corrupt leaders in Georgia” during an unveiling of Ralston's official portrait. Moore was later arrested for attempting to enter the chamber following his ban. He called his arrest evidence of "tyranny".

=== Election administration ===
In the wake of Louisiana v. Callais, the Caucus supported Governor Brian Kemp's call for a special session to consider re-drawing the states' legislative districts to "end racial gerrymandering". The Caucus also advocated for the reintroduction of paper ballots in lieu of electronic voting machines.

=== Education ===
The Caucus wants to keep “dangerous ideology” from being taught in classrooms. In the wake of the 2024 Apalachee High School shooting, the Caucus opposed a bill designed to increase school safety through increased reporting requirements and information sharing between schools and districts, calling it a "school surveillance” bill.

=== Gun control ===
The Caucus supported passing a constitutional carry law, which went into effect in January 2023.

=== Tax policy ===
Moore said the Caucus supports eliminating the state's income tax, calling the tax an example of “mafia rule”. The Caucus has opposed efforts to provide tax breaks to industrial and manufacturing companies, finding its members aligned with House's only Democratic socialist member.

== Members ==
The Caucus does not publish its membership, but members are free to disclose their association.

=== Current members ===
- Sen. Greg Dolezal (R–Alpharetta) – Chairman
- Sen. Colton Moore (R–Trenton)
- Rep. Charlice Byrd (R–Cherokee County)
- Rep. Emory Dunahoo (R–Gillsville)
- Rep. Noelle Kahaian (R–Locust Grove)

=== Former members ===
- Sen. Brandon Beach (R–Alpharetta)
- Sen. Burt Jones (R–Jackson)
- Rep. Timothy Barr (R–Lawrenceville)
- Rep. Sheri Gilligan (R–Cumming)
- Rep. Phillip Singleton (R–Sharpsburg)
