= 1986 Georgia gubernatorial election =

- November 4, 1986
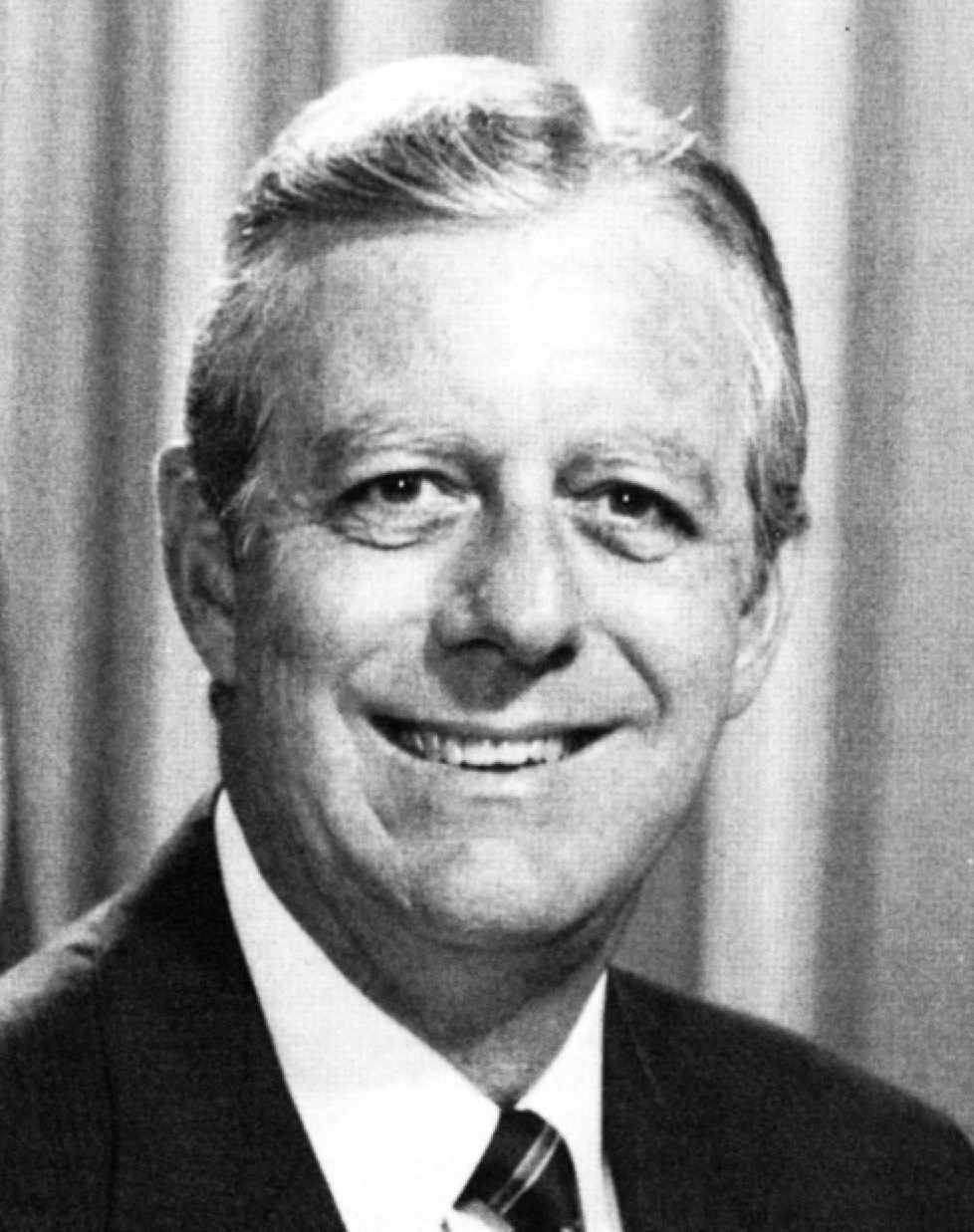

Nominee	Joe Frank Harris	Guy Davis
Party	Democratic	Republican
Popular vote	828,465	346,512
Percentage	70.51%	29.49%
- County results Harris: 50–60% 60–70% 70–80% 80–90%
Governor before election
Joe Frank Harris
Democratic
Elected Governor
Joe Frank Harris
Democratic

The 1986 Georgia gubernatorial election was held on November 4, 1986. Governor Joe Frank Harris (D) was overwhelmingly re-elected over Guy Davis (R) to win re-election.

As of 2026, this was the most recent gubernatorial election in which the winning candidate swept every county in the state, and the last election in which the Democrat won the governorship by double digits. As of 2026, this is the last time Cherokee, Oconee, Glascock, Columbia, and Lee counties voted for the Democratic candidate for governor. Gwinnett and Cobb counties would not vote Democratic again 2018, and Fayette County until 2026.

== General election ==
Georgia gubernatorial election, 1986
Party	Candidate	Votes	%	±%
Democratic	Joe Frank Harris (incumbent)	828,465	70.51%	+7.72
Republican	Guy Davis	346,512	29.49%	−7.68
Majority		481,953	41.02	
Turnout		1,174,977		
Democratic hold		Swing		
