= Rick Jackson (businessman) =

American businessman (born 1954)

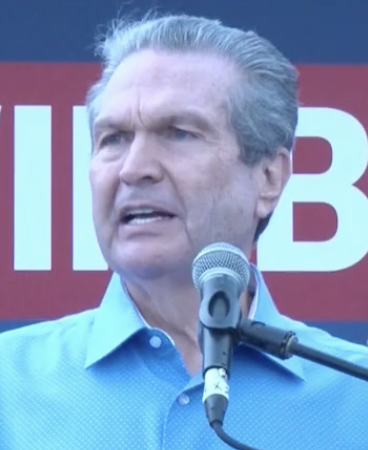
- Jackson in 2026
- Born: Richard Lee Jackson; March 16, 1954 (age 72); Atlanta, Georgia, U.S.
- Education: Lipscomb University (dropped out)
- Occupations: Politician; entrepreneur
- Political party: Republican
- Spouse: Melody Moore
- Children: 3
- Website: Official website

Richard Lee Jackson (born March 16, 1954) is an American billionaire entrepreneur and former political candidate. He is the founder and Chief Executive Officer (CEO) of Jackson Healthcare, a healthcare staffing and services company headquartered in Alpharetta, Georgia.

After defeating lieutenant governor of Georgia Burt Jones in the Republican primary runoff, he became the Republican nominee in the 2026 Georgia gubernatorial election and faced Democratic nominee Keisha Lance Bottoms in the general election. He went on to lose the general election to Bottoms on November 3, 2026.

== Early life and education ==
Richard Lee Jackson was born on March 16, 1954, and grew up in Midtown Atlanta. He described his childhood as being marked by poverty and, later, time in the foster care system. He attended Lipscomb University in Nashville before dropping out.

== Business career ==
Jackson founded his first medical recruitment business in 1978.

In 2012, Jackson, with businessmen Michael Kendrick and Larry Powell, purchased Family Christian Stores (FRS) from Madison Dearborn Partners. The company was converted to a nonprofit and made a subsidiary of Family Christian Resource Centers (FCRC), controlled by Jackson. A 2015 plan by Jackson to file for Chapter 11 bankruptcy was opposed by the U.S. Trustee Office and initially rejected by a bankruptcy judge.

Jackson co-established Jackson Acquisitions, a special-purpose acquisition company (SPAC), with Jeb Bush in 2021; Bush was chairman and Jackson was CEO. They dissolved the SPAC in 2023. The Internal Revenue Service sued Jackson Investment Group LLC in 2024 for underreporting $72 million in taxable income for 2019, seeking $38 million. The IRS made the determination after disallowing expenses related to several philanthropic ventures.

=== Jackson Healthcare ===
In 2000, he founded Jackson Healthcare, which provides healthcare staffing and workforce services. The company opened a new $100 million campus in March 2019, designed by architectural firm Rule Joy Trammell Rubio (RJTR) and styled after an Italian piazza. Jackson Healthcare earned nearly $1 billion from 2020 through 2026 — most during the COVID-19 pandemic — from various Georgia agencies through state contracts.

In 2021, Jackson Healthcare purchased USAntibiotics, an antibiotics manufacturer in Bristol, Tennessee. Jackson Healthcare acquired Omaha-based LRS Healthcare in May 2023. Jackson Healthcare is privately-held and reports more than $3 billion in annual revenue. John Bardis, Jeb Bush, and Tom Price are on the advisory board.

== Political career ==
In the 2010s, Jackson funded an unsuccessful overhaul of Georgia medical malpractice claims, and wanted to privatize the state's foster care system. He successfully increased support for foster children. He has financially supported many Republican politicians, contributing millions to the Republican National Committee, state parties, and candidates. In December 2025, he gave $1 million to Make America Great Again Inc., a super PAC that acts as Donald Trump's political organization.

=== 2026 Georgia gubernatorial election ===
In February 2026, Jackson announced his candidacy for the Republican nomination for governor of Georgia and said he would self-fund a major portion of his campaign. He wants to freeze Georgia's property tax and cut the state's income tax in half. Describing his stance on diversity, equity, and inclusion (DEI) in an interview with WSB-TV, Jackson said, "I believe in diversity and inclusion. I don't believe in equity. I don't believe in equal outcomes, period," calling the latter "communism".

He was endorsed by Georgia Attorney General Chris Carr.

On May 19, 2026, Jackson received 32.5% of the vote in the Republican primary. Jackson defeated Burt Jones in a Republican runoff election on June 16, 2026. Jones had been endorsed by President Trump and Governor Brian Kemp. After winning the Republican nomination, both Trump and Kemp supported Jackson. He faced, and lost to, Democratic nominee Keisha Lance Bottoms in the 2026 Georgia gubernatorial election. Jackson spent more than $200 million of his own money on the race.

== Personal life ==
Jackson lives in Cumming, Georgia, in a 47,000-square-foot (4,400 m^{2}) mansion. He and his wife Melody (née Moore) have three children. One of their sons is president of Jackson Healthcare, and another son runs the Jackson Family Foundation.

Jackson co-produced the film 90 Minutes in Heaven (2015). He is a Christian.

Party political offices
Preceded by Brian Kemp	Republican nominee for Governor of Georgia; 2026	Most recent
