= Josh McLaurin =

American politician (born 1988)

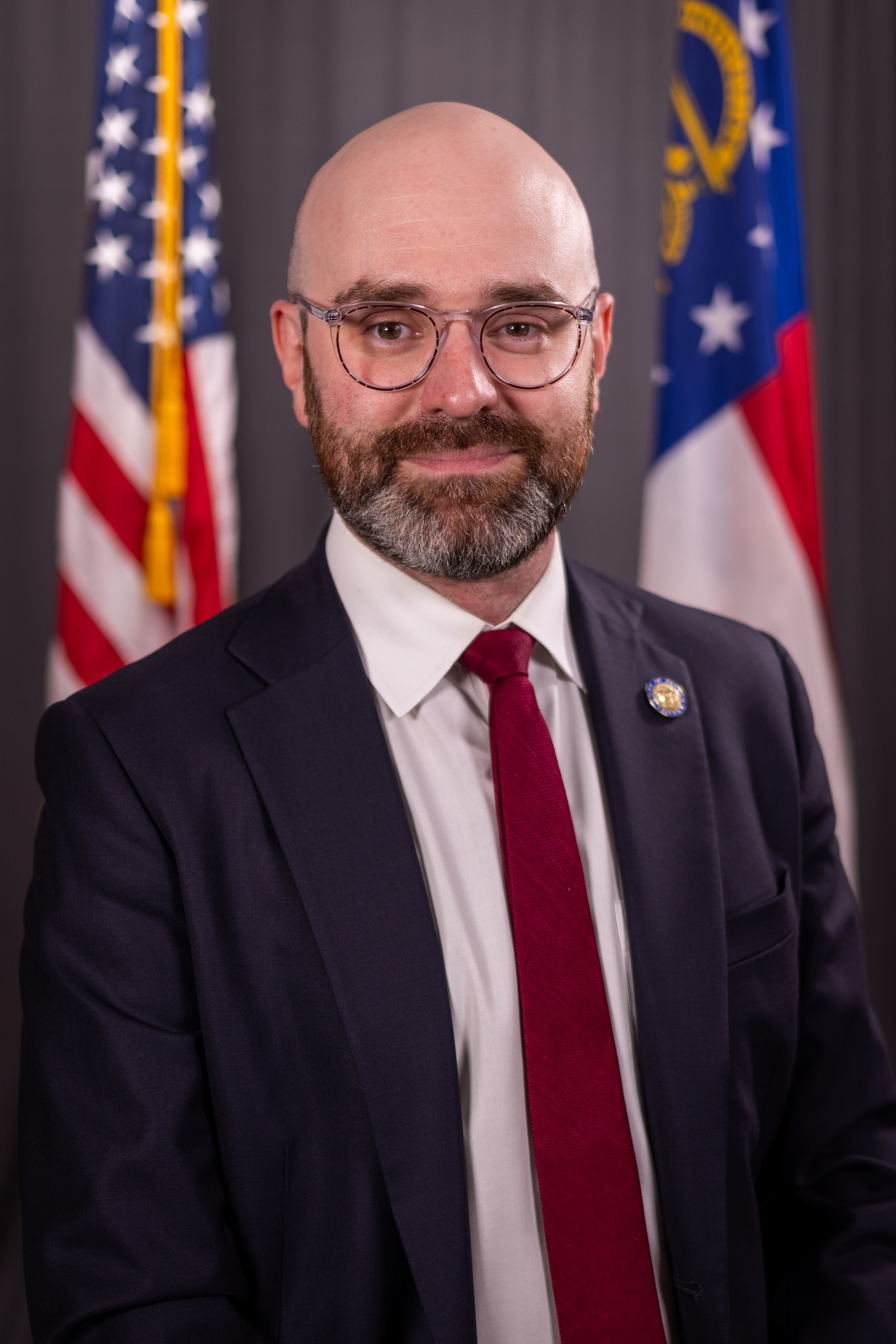
- Official portrait, 2025

Lieutenant Governor-elect of Georgia
- Assuming office January 11, 2027
- Governor: Keisha Lance Bottoms (elect)
- Succeeding: Burt Jones

Member of the Georgia State Senate from the 14th district
- Incumbent
- Assumed office January 9, 2023
- Preceded by: Bruce Thompson
- Succeeded by: Kevin Abel (elect)

Member of the Georgia House of Representatives from the 51st district
- In office January 14, 2019 – January 9, 2023
- Preceded by: Wendell Willard
- Succeeded by: Esther Panitch

Personal details
- Born: Joshua Ivan McLaurin; January 17, 1988 (age 38) Cobb County, Georgia, U.S.
- Party: Democratic
- Education: University of Georgia (AB, MPA); Yale University (JD)
- Website: State senate website Campaign website

Joshua Ivan McLaurin (born January 17, 1988) is an American politician who is the lieutenant governor-elect of Georgia. He is also member of the Georgia State Senate in the state of Georgia. McLaurin represents the 14th district in the state Senate. Before his election to the state Senate, McLaurin served two terms in the Georgia House of Representatives. In November 2026, he was elected Lieutenant Governor of Georgia, defeating Republican state Senator Greg Dolezal.

== Early life ==
McLaurin was born in Cobb County, Georgia. He attended the University of Georgia for college. He then attended Yale Law School, where he briefly lived with author, future U.S. senator, and vice president JD Vance.

== Political career ==
After winning the 2018 election for a seat in the Georgia House of Representatives, McLaurin succeeded 17-year incumbent Wendell Willard in District 51.

In 2022, following Donald Trump's endorsement of JD Vance for that year's Senate election in Ohio, McLaurin shared private text messages Vance had sent him during the 2016 United States presidential campaign positing that Trump could become "America's Hitler". Vance was later elected and inaugurated as Vice President of the United States.

In May 2025, McLaurin announced his candidacy for the 2026 Georgia lieutenant gubernatorial election. McLaurin secured 41.4% of the vote in the May 19, 2026 Democratic Primary, triggering a runoff election. On June 16, 2026, McLaurin won the Democratic nomination for lieutenant governor of Georgia with 54.9% of the vote. In the general election, McLaurin defeated Republican nominee Greg Dolezal to succeed outgoing Lieutenant Governor Burt Jones.

Party political offices
Preceded by Charlie Bailey	Democratic nominee for Lieutenant Governor of Georgia; 2026	Most recent
Political offices
Preceded by Burt Jones	Lieutenant Governor of Georgia; Taking office 2027	Elect
