= 2026 Idaho lieutenant gubernatorial election =

- November 3, 2026
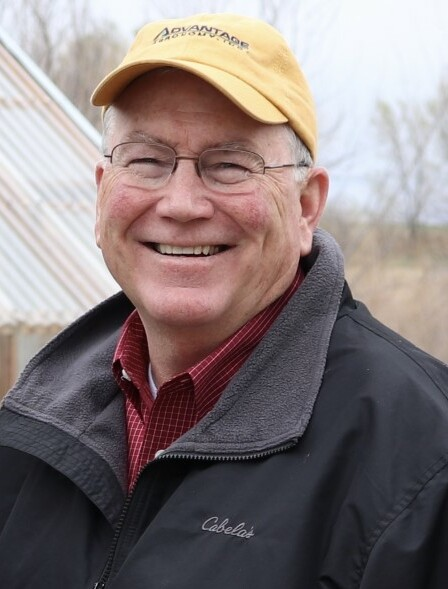

Nominee	Scott Bedke	Eric Myricks
Party	Republican	Democratic
Popular vote	445.910	256.084
Percentage	63.5%	36.5%
- Bedke: 50–60% 60–70% 70–80% 80–90% Myricks: 60–70%
Lieutenant Governor before election
Scott Bedke
Republican
Elected Lieutenant Governor
Scott Bedke
Republican

The 2026 Idaho lieutenant gubernatorial election took place on November 3, 2026, to elect the lieutenant governor of Idaho. Republican incumbent Scott Bedke won a second term. He was challenged by Democratic nominee Eric Myricks.

== Republican primary ==
=== Candidates ===
==== Nominee ====
- Scott Bedke, incumbent lieutenant governor (2023–present)

=== Endorsements ===
Scott Bedke

Executive branch officials

- Dirk Kempthorne, former secretary of the interior (2006–2009) (deceased)

U.S. senators

- Jim Risch, Idaho (2009–present)

Statewide officials

- Brad Little, governor of Idaho (2019–present)
- Butch Otter, former governor of Idaho (2007–2019)

Organizations

- NRA Political Victory Fund

=== Results ===
Republican primary results
Party	Candidate	Votes	%
Republican	Scott Bedke (incumbent)	184,907	100.0
Total votes		184,907	100.0

== Democratic primary ==
=== Candidates ===
==== Nominee ====
- Eric Myricks, nonprofit founder and candidate for mayor of Nampa in 2025

=== Results ===
Democratic primary results
Party	Candidate	Votes	%
Democratic	Eric Myricks	43,574	100.0
Total votes		43,574	100.0

== See also ==
- 2026 United States lieutenant gubernatorial elections
