= Target letter =

Procedure in U.S. federal criminal law

According to the law of the United States, a person receives a target letter when a U.S. attorney has "substantial evidence linking him or her to the commission of a crime". The same legal technique may be used by county prosecutors in some jurisdictions.

In 2005, the New York Times described target letters this way: "The U.S. attorney's manual bars prosecutors from taking witnesses before a grand jury if there is a possibility of future criminal charges unless the witnesses are notified in advance that their grand jury testimony can be used against them in a later indictment." Law professor Randal Lee, a former judge and prosecutor, has said "A target letter is simply a courtesy letter given by the federal government informing you that you're a suspect in a criminal investigation."

Former Assistant United States Attorney for the District of New Jersey Mitchell Epner has said that a target letter may be used by a prosecutor to induce a target of their investigation to flip, meaning to cooperate with the prosecution. Epner said, "Ordinarily, the reason that prosecutors send a target letter is to see if people want to come in to cooperate before they get charged."
