= Georgia's 81st House of Representatives district =

State district in Georgia, USA

Georgia's 81st State House of Representatives district
Representative
Noelle Kahaian; R–Locust Grove
- Demographics: 40.4% White; 11.2% Black; 34.9% Hispanic; 10.6% Asian
- Population: 54,219

District 81 elects one member of the Georgia House of Representatives. It contains parts of Henry County.

== Members ==
- Scott Holcomb (2013–2025)
- Noelle Kahaian (since 2025)
