= Noelle Kahaian =

American politician

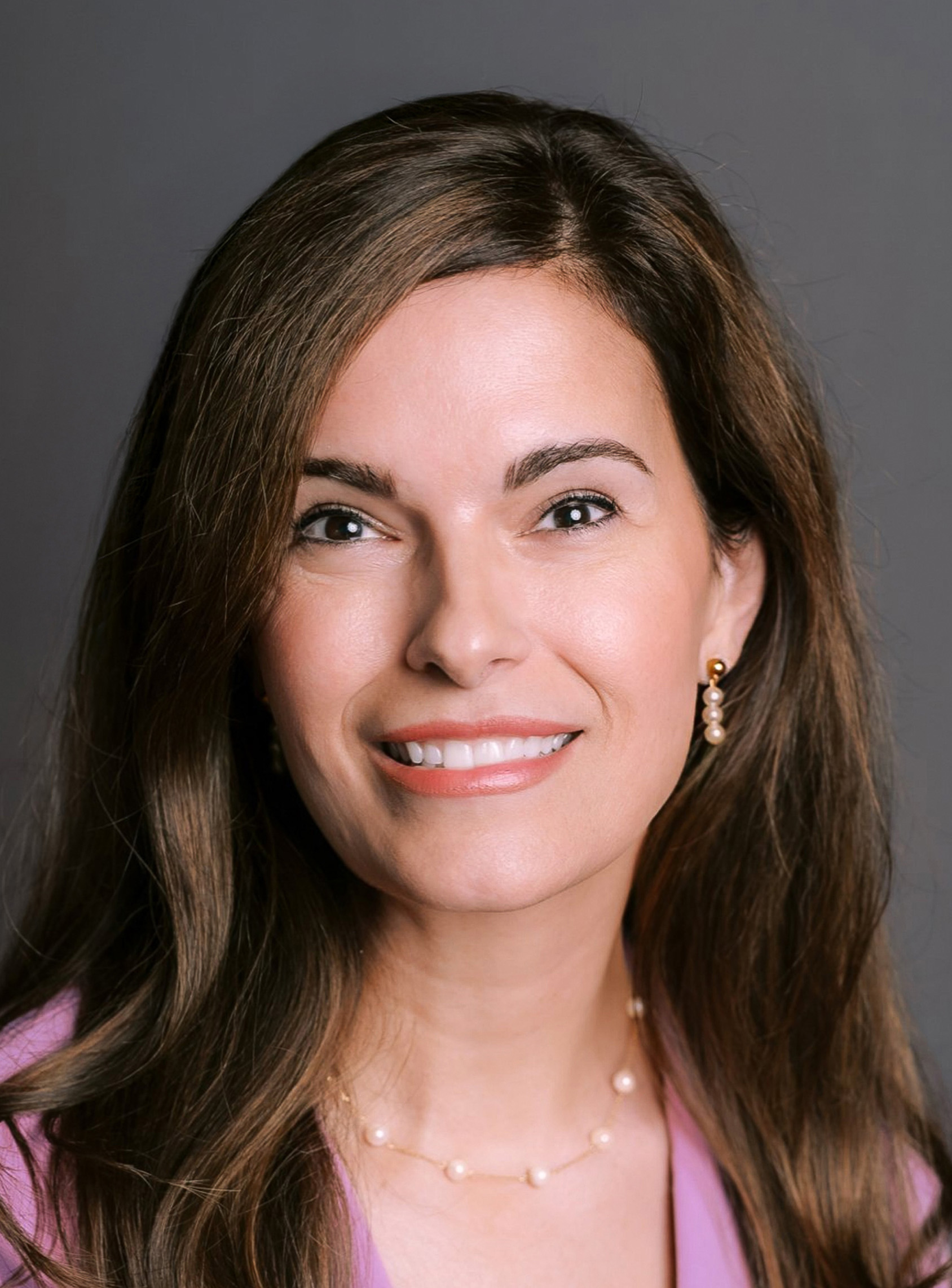
- Official portrait, 2025

Member of the Georgia House of Representatives from the 81st district
- Incumbent
- Assumed office January 13, 2025
- Preceded by: Scott Holcomb

Personal details
- Party: Republican
- Education: William Tyndale College

Noelle Kahaian is an American politician. She serves as a Republican member for the 81st district of the Georgia House of Representatives.

== Life and career ==
Kahaian attended William Tyndale College, earning her bachelor's degree in psychology.

In May 2024, Kahaian defeated Lauren Daniel in the Republican primary election for the 81st district of the Georgia House of Representatives. In November 2024, she defeated Mishael White in the general election, winning 57 percent of the votes. She succeeded Scott Holcomb. She assumed office on January 13, 2025. She is a member of the Georgia Freedom Caucus.

Kahaian supports banning books of an obscene nature in schools. She identifies as pro-life, and supports the Supreme Court's holding in Dobbs v. Jackson Women's Health Organization.
