= Buddy DeLoach =

American politician from Georgia

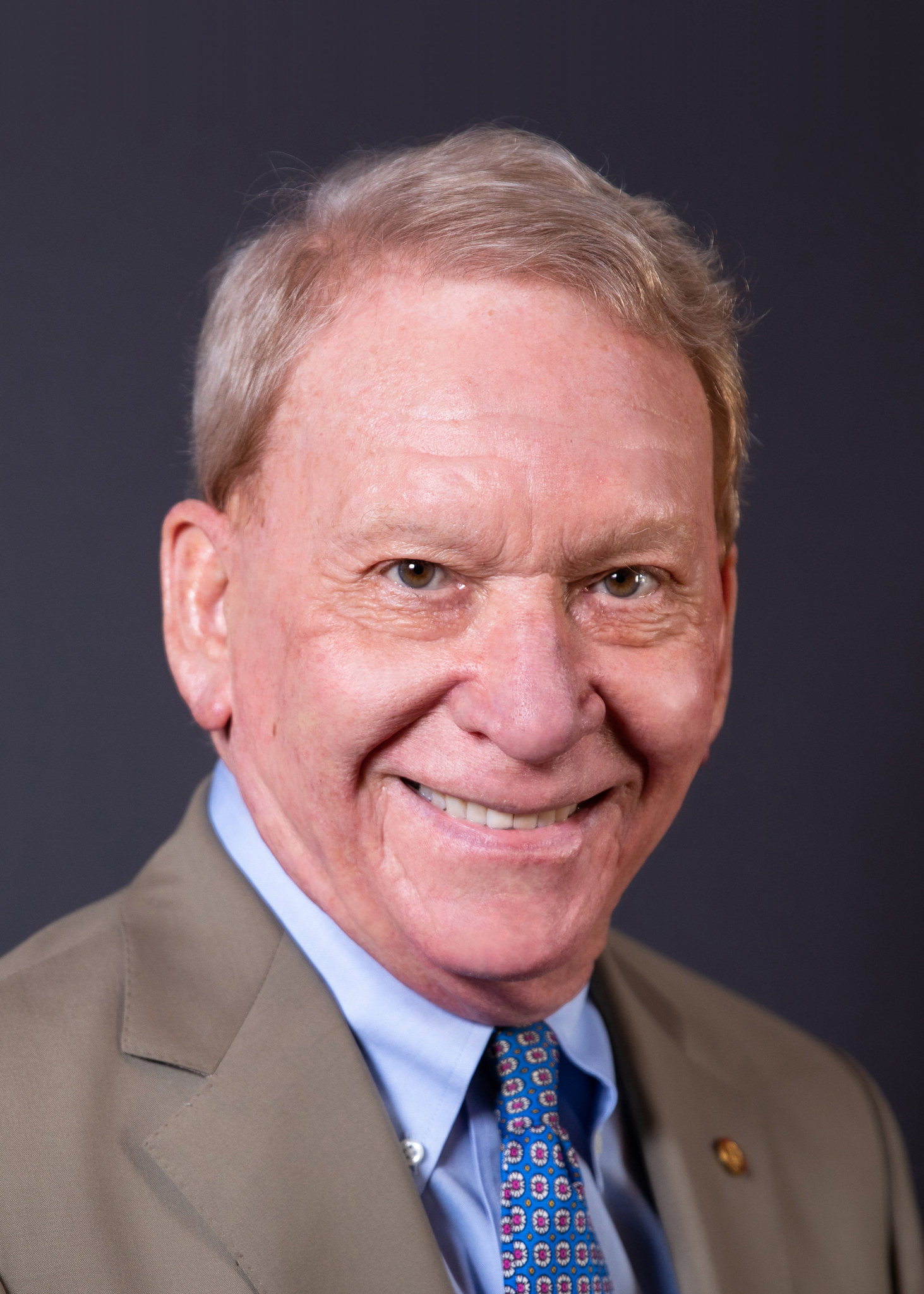
- Official headshot

Member of the Georgia House of Representatives
- Incumbent
- Assumed office January 11, 2021
- Preceded by: Jeff Jones
- Constituency: 167th district
- In office January 9, 1995 – January 10, 2005
- Preceded by: James M. Floyd
- Constituency: 172nd district (1995–2003); 127th district (2003–2005)

Personal details
- Born: Homer Marion DeLoach; February 27, 1942 (age 84) Hinesville, Georgia, U.S.
- Party: Republican
- Education: University of Georgia (BA)

Military service
- Branch/service: United States Army
- Years of service: 1966–1968

Homer Marion "Buddy" DeLoach (born February 27, 1942) is an American politician. He was a member of the Georgia House of Representatives from 1995 to 2005, and is a current member since 2021, serving as Vice Chairman of the Insurance Committee. He is a member of the Republican Party.
