= Blake Tillery =

American politician (born 1983)

Member of the Georgia State Senate from the 19th district
- Incumbent
- Assumed office January 9, 2017
- Preceded by: Tommie Williams

Personal details
- Born: Michael Blake Tillery; October 9, 1983 (age 43) Vidalia, Georgia, U.S.
- Party: Republican
- Spouse: Ashlee Sharer
- Children: 4, including 2 foster children
- Education: University of Georgia (BA, JD)
- Website: Campaign website

Michael Blake Tillery (born October 9, 1983) is an American attorney and politician serving as a member of the Georgia State Senate from the 19th district since 2017. A member of the Republican Party, he is the Chairman of the Senate Appropriations Committee, overseeing Georgia's $43.66 billion state budget. He was a candidate for Lieutenant Governor of Georgia in the 2026 election.

Tillery was previously Chairman of the Toombs County Commission from 2013 to 2016. He is the managing partner of The Tillery Firm in Vidalia, Georgia.

== Early life and education ==
Tillery was born and raised in Vidalia, Georgia, in Toombs County. His father, Mike Tillery, grew up in Rome, Georgia, and his mother, Vicki Tillery, is from Cedartown.

He graduated from Vidalia High School in 2002 and enrolled at the University of Georgia, earning a Bachelor of Arts in International Affairs in 2006. He participated in the L.E.A.D. Athens leadership development program during his undergraduate years. He returned to UGA for law school, where he earned his Juris Doctor in 2010. He was admitted to the State Bar of Georgia on November 4, 2010.

== Personal life ==
Tillery married Ashlee Nicole Sharer in 2016. She is a former Miss Wayne County from Wayne County, Georgia, and practices as an OB-GYN at Memorial Health Meadows Hospital serving Toombs and Jeff Davis counties. The couple has two biological sons and fosters two additional boys.

The family attends Cornerstone Church in Vidalia. Tillery is a fan of the Atlanta Braves and the Georgia Bulldogs.

== Legal career ==
After passing the bar in 2010, Tillery joined Smith & Tillery, P.C. in Vidalia, a firm founded in 1997 by Tommy J. Smith. When Smith was elevated to a Middle Circuit Superior Court judgeship in 2020, the firm was renamed The Tillery Firm, with Tillery as managing partner. The firm practices in workers' compensation, real estate closings, probate, personal injury, civil litigation, and social security disability.

Tillery was recognized as a Super Lawyers Rising Star from 2018 through 2023. He was Chair of the General Practice and Trial Law Section of the State Bar of Georgia in 2019 to 2020.

== Political career ==
=== Toombs County Commission (2013–2016) ===
In 2012, at age 29, Tillery was elected Chairman of the Toombs County Commission, serving from 2013 to 2016.

=== Georgia State Senate (2017–present) ===
When veteran state senator Tommie Williams did not seek re-election in 2016, Tillery won the Republican primary for Senate District 19, a rural district spanning portions of southeast Georgia. He ran unopposed in the general election and took office on January 9, 2017. He has been re-elected without major opposition in every subsequent cycle through 2024.

Governor-elect Brian Kemp appointed Tillery as a Senate floor leader in 2019. Following the death of longtime Appropriations Chairman Jack Hill in April 2020, Tillery was named to succeed him as Chairman of the Senate Appropriations Committee, making him one of the youngest legislators to hold that position. The Atlanta Journal-Constitution listed him among "five newcomers to watch" in the Georgia legislature.

=== Key legislation ===
==== Income tax reduction ====
In 2025, Lt. Gov. Burt Jones appointed Tillery to chair the Senate Special Committee on Eliminating Georgia's Income Tax. This work produced Senate Bills 476 and 477 in the 2026 session. SB 476 would eliminate the income tax for individuals earning under $50,000 and couples under $100,000, reducing the rate to 4.99% for higher earners, offset by repealing 29 corporate and COVID-era tax credits. SB 477 establishes a glide path to a 3.99% rate by 2028 with a goal of full elimination by 2032. Both bills passed the Georgia Senate in February 2026 by votes of 32–18.

==== Anti-sanctuary cities ====
Tillery's SB 21 strips sovereign immunity from local governments and employees that fail to enforce state and federal immigration laws. The bill passed the Georgia Senate 33–18 in February 2025.

==== Mental health facility funding ====
As Appropriations Chairman, Tillery led efforts to secure $409 million for a 300-bed forensic mental health hospital, included in the amended FY 2026 budget (HB 973). The measure passed 49–1 with bipartisan support. Governor Brian Kemp signed the budget on March 3, 2026.

==== Other legislation ====
Tilley's SB 39 bars state health plans, Medicaid, and the prison system from covering gender-affirming procedures (passed 33–19 in February 2025);

In January 2024, Tillery co-sponsored S.B. 390, which would withhold government funding for any libraries in Georgia affiliated with the American Library Association. The bill was drafted following the election of ALA President Emily Drabinski and allegations of the organization promoting a personal ideology and influencing librarian certification.

SB 57 is an anti-"debanking" bill.

== 2026 lieutenant governor campaign ==
Tillery formally entered the race for Lieutenant Governor of Georgia on August 11, 2025, launching with a seven-city fly-around tour from Savannah to Atlanta. The seat is open because incumbent Lt. Gov. Burt Jones is running for Governor.

His campaign platform centers on eliminating the state income tax, combating illegal immigration, supporting law enforcement, advancing conservative social positions, and investing in infrastructure.

By February 2026, Tillery had raised over $3 million, roughly double his nearest competitor, with approximately $2.6 million cash on hand. He has been endorsed by U.S. Rep. Rick Allen and more than 70 Georgia sheriffs.

The qualified Republican primary field also includes former Senate President Pro Tem John F. Kennedy (R-Macon), Sen. Greg Dolezal (R-Cumming), and Brenda Nelson-Porter.

== 2016 traffic fatality ==
On April 11, 2016, Tillery's vehicle struck Bunji Mark Takaya, a 44-year-old man riding his bicycle along Highway 292 in Toombs County. A witness reported that a vehicle ahead of Tillery had passed the cyclist moments before the collision. Takaya died at a local hospital; no alcohol or drugs were found in his system.

The Georgia State Patrol Specialized Collision Reconstruction Team investigated the crash. Phone records indicated text messages were received on Tillery's phone around the time of the collision. Toxicology showed Tillery had taken dextromethorphan (a common cough suppressant) that morning, and he told investigators he had been operating on limited sleep.

The case was referred to the Georgia Attorney General's office and subsequently transferred to District Attorney Heyward Altman for prosecution review, and to avoid a conflict of interest. In a December 21, 2016 letter to Toombs County state court solicitor Justin Franklin, Altman wrote that the facts did not establish a basis for felony prosecution and that the matter should be transferred to state court for possible prosecution of any pertinent misdemeanor. On January 5, 2017, Altman declined to file felony charges, and the case was transferred to state court for misdemeanor traffic offenses. A civil wrongful death lawsuit was filed in 2016 and resulted in a settlement.

The Georgia Department of Public Safety later destroyed the case file approximately five years after the crash, citing standard records retention policy.

== Honors ==
Honors include Georgia Trend "40 Under 40" (2013), University of Georgia "40 Under 40" (2019), and the Georgia Academy of Family Physicians' Legislative Champion of the Year Award (2024). He is a graduate of Leadership Georgia (Class of 2015).

== Electoral history ==
Year	Office	Result
2012	Chairman, Toombs County Commission	Won
2016	Georgia State Senate, District 19	Won (unopposed general)
2018	Georgia State Senate, District 19	Won
2020	Georgia State Senate, District 19	Won
2022	Georgia State Senate, District 19	Won
2024	Georgia State Senate, District 19	Won
2026	Lieutenant Governor of Georgia	Pending
