= Georgia's 27th Senate district =

Georgia's 27th State Senate district
Senator
Greg Dolezal; R–Cumming
- Demographics: 68.00% White; 4.31% Black; 11.61% Hispanic; 11.41% Asian; 0.18% Native American; 0.04% Hawaiian/Pacific Islander; 0.52% Other; 5.40% Multiracial
- Population (2020) • Voting age: 190,676; 139,196

District 27 of the Georgia Senate is located in northern Metro Atlanta. It contains most of Forsyth County, except for the southeastern part of the county generally east of Peachtree Parkway and south of Buford Highway.

The current senator is Greg Dolezal, a Republican from Cumming first elected in 2018.
