= Georgia's 100th House of Representatives district =

State district in Georgia, USA

Georgia's 100th State House of Representatives district
Representative
David Clark; R–Buford
- Demographics: 14.3% White; 32.3% Black; 37.3% Hispanic; 12.8% Asian
- Population: 58,844

District 100 elects one member of the Georgia House of Representatives. It contains parts of Forsyth County, Gwinnett County and Hall County.

== Members ==
- Brian Thomas (until 2013)
- Dewey McClain (2013–2023)
- David Clark (since 2023)
