= Georgia's 167th House of Representatives district =

State district in Georgia, USA

Georgia's 167th State House of Representatives district
Representative
Buddy DeLoach; R–Townsend
- Demographics: 67.5% White; 21.6% Black; 6.4% Hispanic; 0.8% Asian
- Population: 58,973

District 167 elects one member of the Georgia House of Representatives. It contains the entirety of Long County and McIntosh County, as well as parts of Glynn County, Liberty County and Wayne County.

== Members ==
- Jeff Jones (2015–2021)
- Buddy DeLoach (since 2021)
