= Greg Dolezal =

American politician (born 1978)

- Official portrait, 2024

Member of the Georgia State Senate from the 27th district
- Incumbent
- Assumed office January 14, 2019
- Preceded by: Michael Williams

Personal details
- Born: Gregory Robert Dolezal; October 1, 1978 (age 48)
- Party: Republican
- Spouse: Natalie Pritchett (m. 2001)
- Children: 4
- Education: North Park University (BA)
- Website: State senate website Campaign website

Gregory Robert Dolezal (born October 1, 1978) is an American politician who is currently serving as the Georgia state senator for the 27th district in Cumming, Georgia. He is a member of the Georgia Freedom Caucus.

Dolezal was the 2026 Republican nominee for lieutenant governor of Georgia. He was defeated by Democrat Josh McLaurin in the general election on November 3, 2026.

== Life and career ==
Dolezal grew up in Joliet, Illinois. He graduated from North Park University in 2001 with degrees in business administration and communication studies; he had planned to attend law school but instead moved to Atlanta, where he worked at North Point Community Church and began doing video production work for Louie Giglio's Passion Conferences. He also worked for eleven years as tour manager for Christian musician Chris Tomlin.

Previously, Dolezal served as a member of the Forsyth County Planning Commission, Comprehensive Plan Steering Committee, Impact Fee Committee, and Transportation Plan Steering Committee. After writing an open letter accusing then-Commissioner Brian Tam, whom Dolezal would run against in the 2018 primary, of "releasing false and misleading information," the commission voted to deny a motion to extend Dolezal's term on the Planning Commission.

Dolezal initially announced his candidacy for the Georgia Senate on June 5, 2017. The next year, he defeated Democratic challenger Steve Smith in the 2018 elections by a wide margin. He is a conservative and favors funding for building new schools, is against tax increases, and wants to expand county roads.

In February 2019, then-Georgia Senate Majority Whip Steve Gooch named Dolezal as deputy whip; Dolezal stated he was "humbled by the trust that Senator Gooch has placed in me." Dolezal also is Vice Chair of the Science and Technology Committee and a member of the Education and Youth Committee, the Health and Human Services Committee, the Government Oversight Committee, and the Reapportionment and Redistricting Committee.

In December 2020, Dolezal signed a petition supporting the right of the Georgia General Assembly to overrule the outcome of the 2020 election within the state.

In January 2024, Dolezal co-sponsored S.B. 390, which would withhold government funding for any libraries in Georgia affiliated with the American Library Association; the bill states that the organization "has used the librarian certification process to promote its ideology", and was drafted following the election of ALA president Emily Drabinski and a social media post in which she called herself a "Marxist lesbian".

Dolezal is a founder and partner at Forsyth County-based technology company Renewed Vision, which was founded in 2000 and makes live production software called ProPresenter used by megachurches, the International Olympic Committee, Chick-fil-A, and Mercedes-Benz. He is also an owner and board member of Catalyst Nutraceuticals and a founder of Passion City Church.

== Elections ==
=== Primary and general elections, 2018 ===
In 2018, Dolezal faced two opponents in the Republican primary elections for Georgia State Senate district 27; the other challengers were Bill Fielder and Brian Tam. On May 22, Dolezal won the primary with 59% of the vote.

Primary election results for Georgia State Senate district 27, 2018
Party	Candidate	Votes	%
Republican	Greg Dolezal	14,770	59.04
Republican	Bill Fielder	4,071	16.27
Republican	Brian Tam	6,177	24.69
Total votes		25,018	100.00

In the general election in November, Dolezal was challenged by Democratic candidate Steve Smith for Michael Williams' seat, but Dolezal ultimately defeated Smith with over 70% of ballots cast.

General election results for Georgia State Senate district 27, 2018
Party	Candidate	Votes	%
Republican	Greg Dolezal	66,054	72.64
Democratic	Steve Smith	24,883	27.36
Total votes		90,937	100.00
Republican hold			

In the 2020 November general election Dolezal won as incumbent against Brooke Griffiths.

General election results for Georgia State Senate district 27, 2020
Party	Candidate	Votes	%
Republican	Greg Dolezal	87,192	70.0
Democratic	Brooke Griffiths	37,340	30.0
Total votes		124,532	100.00
Republican hold			

== Personal life ==
Greg Dolezal lives in Forsyth County with his wife and four children.

Party political offices
Preceded by Burt Jones	Republican nominee for Lieutenant Governor of Georgia; 2026	Most recent
