= David Clark (Georgia politician) =

American politician

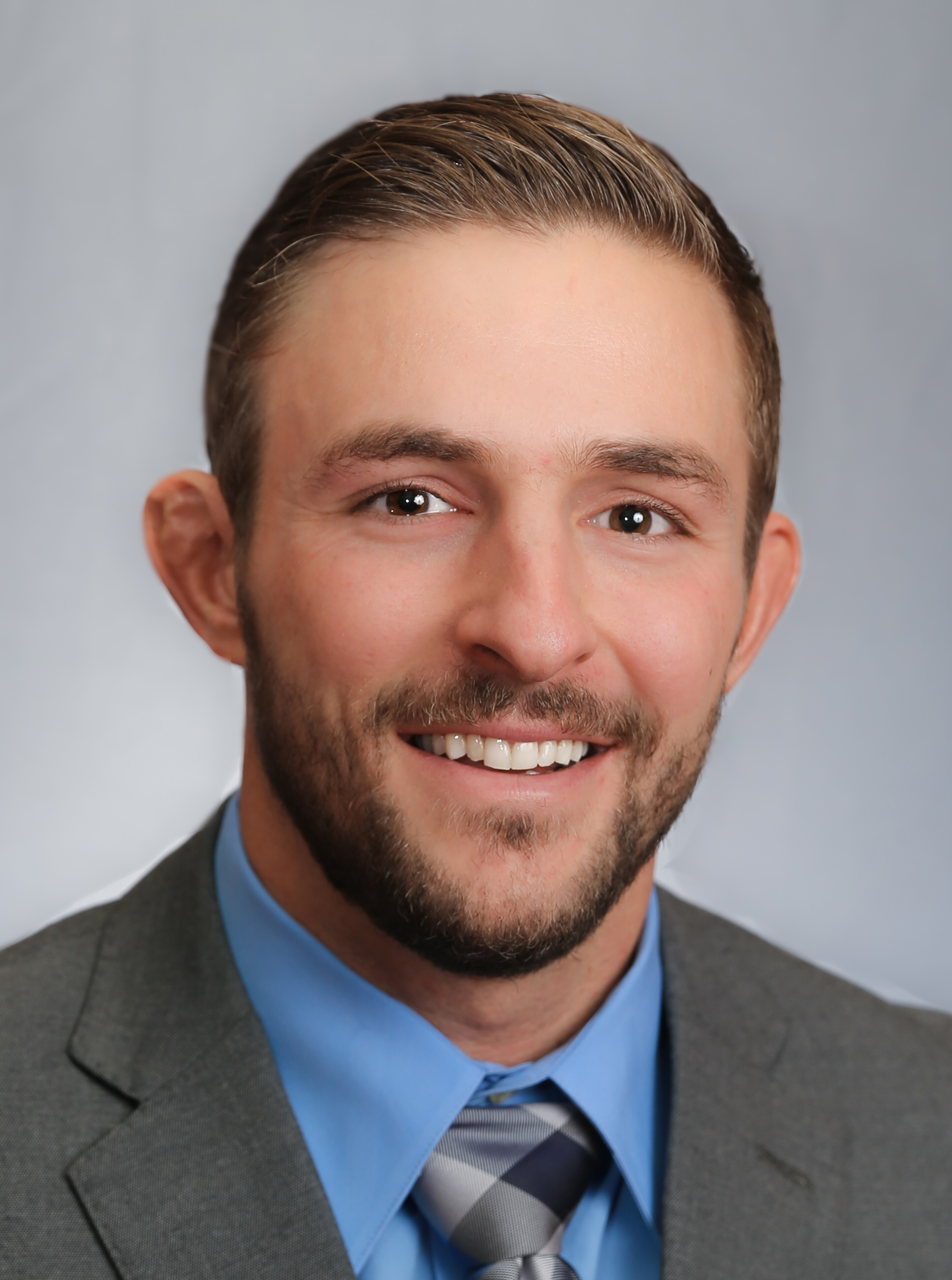

Member of the Georgia House of Representatives
- Incumbent
- Assumed office January 12, 2015
- Preceded by: Michael Brown
- Constituency: 98th district (2015–2023); 100th district (2023–present)

Personal details
- Born: David Timothy Clark; July 15, 1986 (age 40) Suwanee, Georgia, U.S.
- Party: Republican
- Spouse: Courtney Clark
- Children: 3
- Education: Georgia Gwinnett College (BA)

David Timothy Clark (born July 15, 1986) is an American politician. He is a member of the Georgia House of Representatives from the 100th District, serving since 2015. Clark has sponsored 159 bills. He is a member of the Republican Party. In June 2022, Clark gained attention after beating the Majority Caucus Chairwoman, Bonnie Rich, with 59.25% of the vote.

Representative Clark is a graduate of the Gwinnett Leadership Institute. He and his wife, Courtney, have a daughter and two sons. They are involved in their church and live in Sugar Hill.
