= Burt Jones =

American politician (born on 1979)

- Official portrait, 2023

13th Lieutenant Governor of Georgia
- Incumbent
- Assumed office January 9, 2023
- Governor: Brian Kemp
- Preceded by: Geoff Duncan

Member of the Georgia State Senate from the 25th district
- In office January 14, 2013 – January 9, 2023
- Preceded by: Johnny Grant
- Succeeded by: Rick Williams

Personal details
- Born: William Burton Jones; April 25, 1979 (age 47) Jackson, Georgia, U.S.
- Party: Republican
- Spouse: Janice Boswell
- Children: 2
- Education: University of Georgia (BA)
- Website: Office website

William Burton Jones (born April 25, 1979) is an American politician and businessman who has served as the 13th lieutenant governor of Georgia since 2023. A member of the Republican Party, he served as a member of the Georgia State Senate from 2013 to 2023, representing the 25th District.

Before entering politics, Jones played football for the University of Georgia, and went on to work in the insurance industry. As a state senator he was a strong supporter of Donald Trump and, after the 2020 presidential election, was one of a group of Georgia Republicans who acted as false electors in an effort to overturn Trump's defeat in the state. Prosecutors named him as an unindicted co-conspirator in the Fulton County election-interference case, but ultimately did not bring charges against him.

He was a candidate in the Republican primary in the 2026 Georgia gubernatorial election, losing the runoff to healthcare executive Rick Jackson.

== Early life and education ==
Jones is a sixth generation Georgian from Jackson, Georgia.

Jones is a 1998 graduate of Woodward Academy and a 2002 graduate of the University of Georgia, where he played football and received a bachelor's of arts in history. He was co-captain of the 2002 Georgia Bulldogs football team, which won the SEC Championship after a twenty-year title drought.

== Business career ==
An oil executive, he is heir to the Jones Petroleum Company.

In 2004, Jones founded JP Capital & Insurance, Inc., an insurance business in Jackson, Georgia. The insurance and lending company is a subsidiary of Jones Petroleum Co.

== Political career ==
=== Butts County Water and Sewage Authority ===
Jones served as a member of the board of directors of the Butts County Water and Sewage Authority from 2009 to 2021. Following Jones's departure, his father, Bill Jones, took his spot on the board of directors. While a board member, he voted to raise water and sewer rates.

=== Georgia State Senate ===
In June 2012, Jones announced his intent to challenge three term incumbent State Senator Johnny Grant. Jones, who framed himself as an outsider businessman ultimately defeated Grant 52.7% to 47.3% in the 2012 Republican Party primary.

Jones was elected a member of the state senate in 2012, and he took office in 2013. During his time in the state Senate, Jones served as the chairman of the Insurance and Labor Committee, chairman of the Banking & Financial Institutions Committee, and as a member of the Appropriations and Transportation Committees. While a member, Jones voted to establish a flat income tax rate, prohibit teaching about systemic racism in schools, and he co-sponsored legislation to allow biblical classes to be taught in high schools.

He was a member of the Georgia Freedom Caucus.

==== Endorsement of Donald Trump for president ====
In 2015, Jones was the first member of the Georgia General Assembly to endorse businessman Donald Trump in the 2016 Republican presidential primary. "Sometimes it might not be the most politically correct — as they say — thing to say, but he doesn't back down and he doesn't apologize for it", Jones said in August 2015. "I think people are looking for that in a leader now."

==== Support for adoptable dogs ====
In 2016, Jones, along with State Rep. Joe Wilkinson (R-Sandy Springs) led the push on Senate Bill 168 to declare "adoptable dog" as the official state dog of Georgia despite pushback from his Republican colleagues. Jones has also been a vocal leader on increasing funding for animal shelters and abused dog rescue efforts throughout the state of Georgia.

==== Expression of religious beliefs ====
In 2016, Jones supported Senate Bill 309, which allows for student athletes to express their personal religious beliefs during sporting events and enables high schools, which receive state funding, to participate in athletic competitions with schools outside of their designated conference. It was signed into law by Governor Nathan Deal on May 3, 2016.

Upon final passage of the law, Jones was quoted as saying: "I'm grateful Governor Deal signed this legislation into law. Expressing ones beliefs and principles is a right that no one should be denied. It is also a huge step in the right direction to let athletes compete with members outside of their conference because it will increase the drive, skill level and motivation for athletes around the state. With increased competition, they will be motivated to do the best they can to stay at the top of their game."

==== Attempt to overturn 2020 presidential election results ====
While some Georgia Republicans acknowledged Joe Biden's victory in the 2020 presidential election, Jones denied the election results and promoted Trump's false claims of election irregularities. In December 2020, Jones was one of four state Senate Republicans who signed a petition calling on the Georgia General Assembly to overrule the outcome of democratic elections within the state and "take back the power to appoint electors." The petition called on Governor Brian Kemp to convene a special session of the legislature to award Georgia's 16 electors to Trump, who narrowly lost the state. Kemp denied the request.

On January 5, 2021, hours before the U.S. Senate certified the electoral votes from the 2020 election, Jones brought a letter signed by himself and 16 other state legislators attempting to delay the certification. While Jones had a private audience with Vice President Mike Pence that evening he decided against delivering the letter instead leaving it with his Uber driver.

On January 19, 2021, Lieutenant Governor Geoff Duncan stripped Jones of his chairmanship and membership of the state Senate Insurance and Labor Committee. Over a series of months in 2021, Jones continued to question the results of the presidential election in Georgia. In July 2021, Jones was featured at a pro-Trump convention in Rome, Georgia, centering on Trump's false claims of election fraud.

In January 2022, the Justice Department began a criminal investigation into Jones as one of the false electors who attempted to forge electoral certificates for the State of Georgia after the 2020 election. In July 2022, Fulton County, Georgia prosecutor Fani Willis announced that she had sent a target letter to Jones and two other Republican officials, warning them that they face indictment in connection with the fake electors scheme, which was part of the attempts to overturn the 2020 United States presidential election. Judge Robert McBurney blocked Fani Willis from building a case against Jones because she planned to host a fundraiser for Charlie Bailey, the Democratic candidate for Lieutenant Governor.

On August 14, 2023, Jones was named as unindicted co-conspirator #8 as part of the Fulton County indictment against Donald Trump and 18 others in connection with efforts to overturn the 2020 presidential election. Pete Skandalakis, executive director of the Prosecuting Attorneys' Council of Georgia, decided not to pursue criminal charges against him.

=== Campaign for lieutenant governor ===
Jones announced his candidacy for the Republican nomination for lieutenant governor in August 2021. During his campaign, Jones continued to cast doubt on the validity of the 2020 presidential election. Donald Trump endorsed Jones. Jones voiced support for same-sex marriage during his campaign.

In 2022, the Georgia Government Transparency and Campaign Finance Commission fined Jones $1,000 for filming and tweeting a campaign video the previous year before filing the paperwork necessary to accept campaign contributions and make campaign consent orders. The Commission's consent order said that Jones's campaign had accepted responsibility for the error. Between February and May 2022, Jones used his family's private aircraft to travel to campaign events, without reporting the flights' costs as expenses and in-kind contributions on disclosure forms; Jones' campaign said that he intended to report the costs as a single line item after the primary election was over, although Georgia law requires expenses and contributions to be disclosed as they are made.

In the May 2022 Republican primary, Jones defeated Butch Miller, with Jones receiving 50.1% of the vote, Miller 31.1%, Mack McGregor 11.3%, and Jeanne Seaver 7.5%. Obtaining a majority, he narrowly avoided a runoff election. Of Georgia's 159 counties, Jones received the most votes in 153 counties, and Miller received the most votes in six counties. He went on to defeat Democratic nominee Charlie Bailey in the November 8 general election, by 5%. Jones was sworn in on January 9, 2023.

=== Lieutenant governor ===
Following his swearing in, Jones laid out his legislative agenda for the 2023 session. Included was seeking out extra funding for K-12 school counselors, eliminating the state income tax, and no further restrictions on abortion following the 2019 law. During the 2023 state budget negotiations, Jones pushed for a new hospital regulations that would allow counties with fewer than 50,000 residents "to build hospitals without first obtaining a costly 'certificate of need' from state regulators." One such hospital was potentially going to be built in Butts County, Jones' hometown, on land owned by Bill Jones, Burt's father. Ultimately the provision was not included, and the state budget passed the state Senate on March 29, 2023.

==== Opposition to diversity, equity, and inclusion programs ====
Jones wrote a letter to Sonny Perdue, Chancellor of the University System of Georgia inquiring as to how much USG funding was devoted to diversity, equity, and inclusion (DEI) programs within the state university system.

In Jones's letter to Perdue, he said: "In light of concerns you and other officials from the University System have expressed about the potential need to raise tuition or cut programs and services that are currently offered, I would like to learn more about how the University System spends the funds it receives."

Jones's words came in response to a $66 million slate of cuts to the state college program as part of the 2023 budget that Perdue felt as harmful.

==== The Riley Gaines Act ====
During the 2025 legislative session, Jones and Senator Greg Dolezal led support on Senate Bill 1, the Riley Gaines Act.

Senate Bill 1 was based on legislative findings relating to the work of the Senate Special Committee on the Protection of Women's Sports.

The Riley Gaines Act specifically aims to restrict transgender student-athletes from participating in women's sports and mandates separate restrooms and locker rooms based on assigned sex at birth. Upon passage, Georgia joined 26 other states that ban transgender student-athletes from participating in women's sports and from using locker rooms of their preferred gender.

After SB 1 was signed by Governor Brian Kemp, Jones was quoted as saying:

Just like President Trump is delivering on promises made in D.C., here in Georgia we are keeping our promises and fulfilling our commitments to the people of Georgia – specifically our female athletes. As the father of a female athlete – nothing is more important than ensuring that the protection of women's sports is a reality in Georgia. I want to thank Governor Brian Kemp for signing Senate Bill 1 into law and Senator Greg Dolezal for sponsoring this priority. I also want to thank Riley Gaines and the other brave female athletes who shared their heroic stories and helped shaped this legislation; we couldn't have done it without their courage and support. The Senate has always led the way on protecting women's sports and with Senate Bill 1 becoming law, the protection of women's sports is now a reality for all female athletes in Georgia.

=== 2026 gubernatorial campaign ===
Jones was a candidate in the Republican primary in the 2026 Georgia gubernatorial election, with an endorsement from President Donald Trump. The primary race featured an advertising battle back and forth between Jones and opponent Rick Jackson, the two frontrunners in race. On May 19, 2026, Jones received 38% of the vote in the Republican primary, the largest fraction of any Republican candidate. Since Georgia requires a candidate to receive over 50% of the vote to win, Jones faced Jackson in a Republican runoff election on June 16, 2026. Despite endorsements from Trump and the outgoing governor, Brian Kemp, Jones lost the runoff to Jackson.

== Electoral history ==
=== 2022 ===
2022 general election, Lieutenant Governor
Party	Candidate	Votes	%
Republican	Burt Jones	2,009,617	51.39
Democratic	Charlie Bailey	1,815,524	46.43
Libertarian	Ryan Graham	85,207	2.18
Total votes		3,910,348	100
Republican hold			

=== 2020 ===
2020 general election, State Senate District 25
Party	Candidate	Votes	%	±%
Republican	Burt Jones	61,330	67.66	
Democratic	Veronica Brinson	29,315	32.34	
Majority		32,015	35.31	
Turnout		90,645		
Republican hold				

Party political offices
Preceded by Geoff Duncan	Republican nominee for Lieutenant Governor of Georgia; 2022	Succeeded by Greg Dolezal
Political offices
Preceded by Geoff Duncan	Lieutenant Governor of Georgia; 2023–present	Incumbent
