= 2024 Georgia State Senate election =

- November 5, 2024

All 56 seats in the Georgia State Senate 29 seats needed for a majority
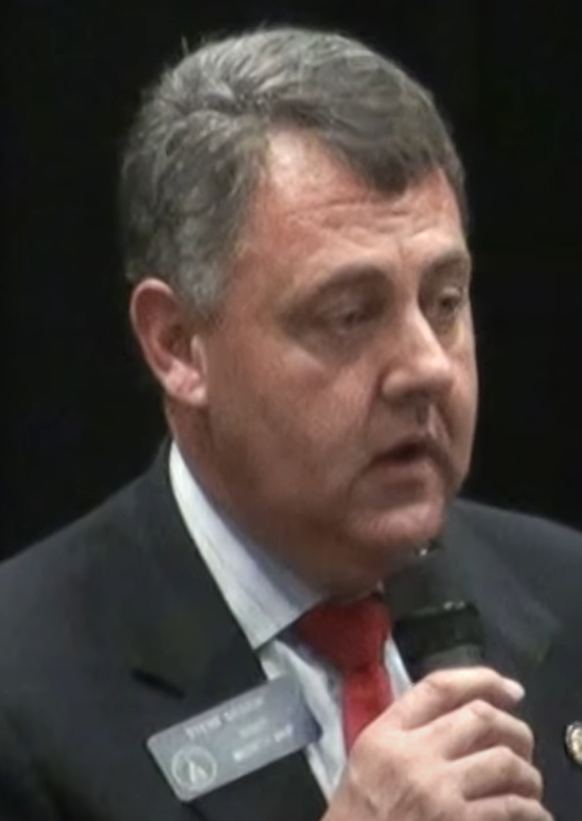

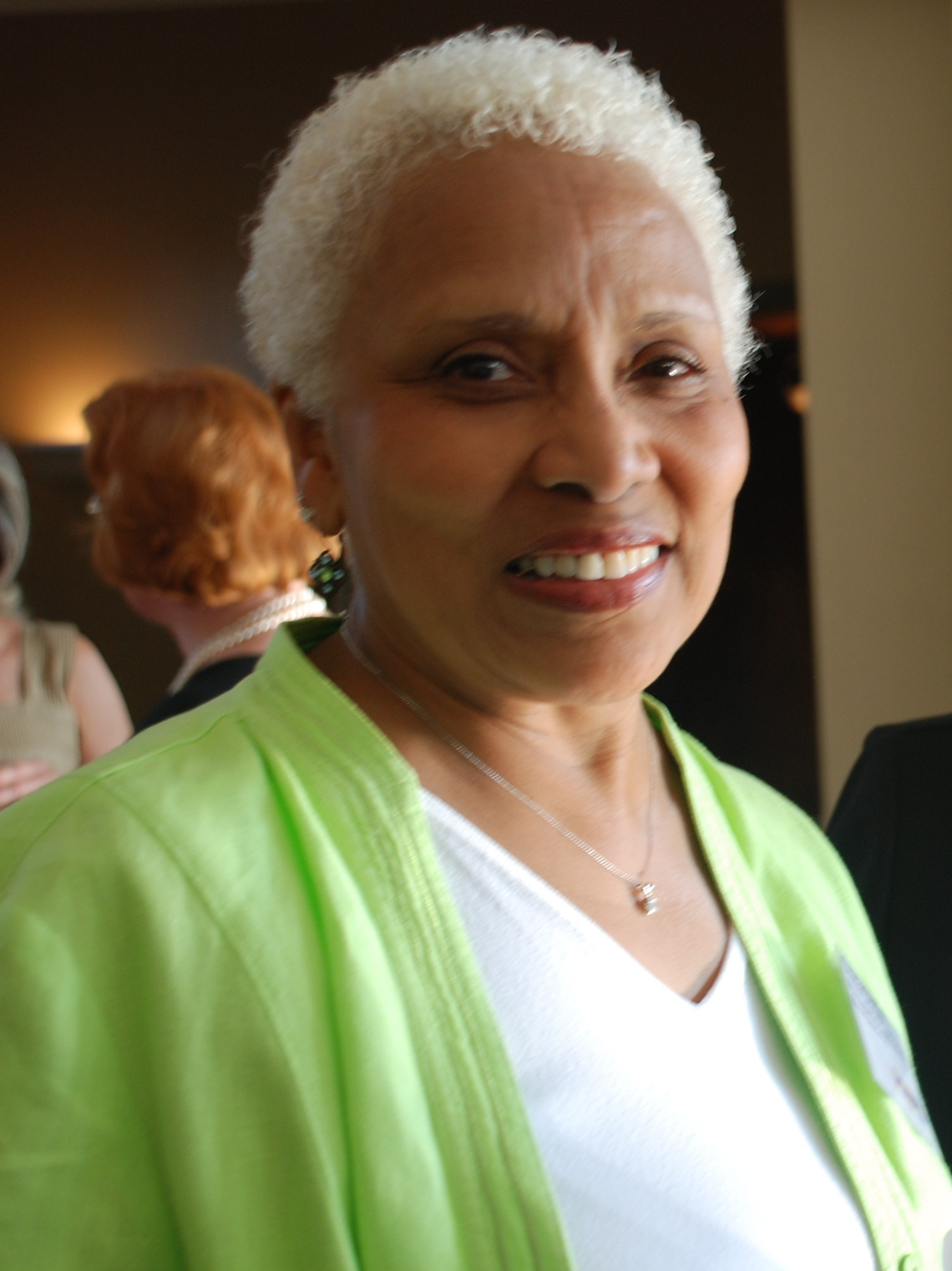
	Majority party	Minority party
Leader	Steve Gooch	Gloria Butler (retired)
Party	Republican	Democratic
Leader's seat	30th	55th
Last election	33	23
Seats won	33	23
Seat change	Steady	Steady
Popular vote	2,608,031	2,076,937
Percentage	55.67%	44.33%
Swing	▲0.41%	▼0.41%
- Republican hold Democratic hold 50–60% 60–70% 70–80% 80–90% >90% 50–60% 60–70% 70–80% 80–90% >90%
Majority leader before election
Steve Gooch
Republican
Elected Majority leader
Steve Gooch
Republican

Elections to the Georgia State Senate were held on November 5, 2024, alongside the other 2024 United States elections. All 56 seats were up for election.

== Partisan Background ==
In the 2020 Presidential Election, Republican Donald Trump won 33 districts, and Democrat Joe Biden won 23.

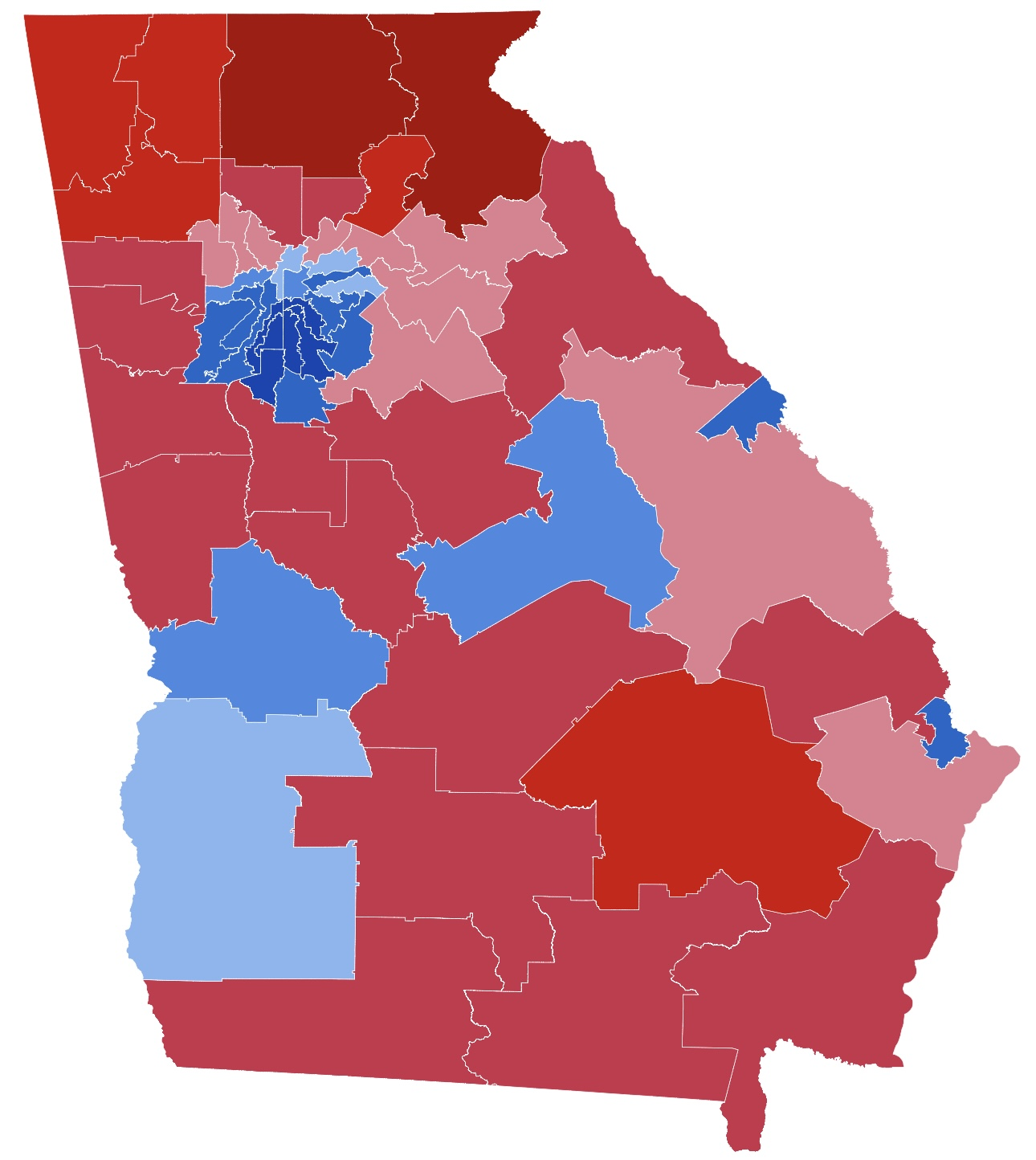
Biden 50–60% 60–70% 70–80% 80–90% / Trump 40–50% 50–60% 60–70% 70–80% 80–90%

== Retirements ==
=== Democrats ===
1. District 34: Valencia Seay retired.
2. District 38: Horacena Tate retired.
3. District 55: Gloria Butler retired.

=== Republicans ===
1. District 49: Shelly Echols retired.

== Special Elections ==
=== District 11 ===
Dean Burke, first elected in 2012, resigned on December 31, 2022 to be a chief medical officer of the Georgia Department of Community Health.

Georgia's 11th Senate district, 2023 special election
Party	Candidate	Votes	%
Republican	Sam Watson	10,099	76.04
Democratic	Mary Weaver-Anderson	3,048	22.95
Libertarian	John H. Monds	135	1.01
Total votes		13,282	100.0
Republican hold			

=== District 30 ===
Mike Dugan, first elected in 2012, resigned on January 3, 2024 to run for Georgia's 3rd Congressional District for 2024 United States House of Representatives elections in Georgia.

Georgia's 30th Senate district, 2024 special election
Party	Candidate	Votes	%
Republican	Tim Bearden	4,548	58.87
Democratic	Ashley Kecskes Godwin	1,327	17.18
Republican	Robert Bob Smith	989	12.80
Republican	Renae Bell	862	11.16
Total votes		7,726	100.0
Republican hold			

== Predictions ==
Source	Ranking	As of
CNalysis	Solid R	March 26, 2024

== Closest races ==
Seats where the margin of victory was under 10%:

1. State Senate district 48, 7.16%

== Results summary ==
District		2020 Pres.	Incumbent				Candidates	Result
District		2020 Pres.	Member	Party	First elected	Running	Candidates	Result
1	1	R +13.0	Ben Watson	Republican	2015	Yes	▌ ✓ Ben Watson (Republican); Republican primary: ▌ ✓ Ben Watson (Republican); ▌Beth Majeroni (Republican)	Republican hold
2	2	D +45.4	Derek Mallow	Democratic	2023	Yes	▌ ✓ Derek Mallow (Democratic)	Democratic hold
3	3	R +31.6	Mike Hodges	Republican	2023	Yes	▌ ✓ Mike Hodges (Republican)	Republican hold
4	4	R +32.7	Billy Hickman	Republican	2020	Yes	▌ ✓ Billy Hickman (Republican)	Republican hold
5	5	D +46.4	Sheikh Rahman	Democratic	2019	Yes	▌ ✓ Sheikh Rahman (Democratic); ▌Lisa Babbage (Republican)	Democratic hold
6	6	R +40.6	Matt Brass	Republican	2017	Yes	▌ ✓ Matt Brass (Republican); ▌Jenny Enderlin (Democratic)	Republican hold
7	7	D +16.8	Nabilah Islam	Democratic	2023	Yes	▌ ✓ Nabilah Islam (Democratic); ▌J. Gregory Howard (Republican); Republican primary: ▌ ✓ J. Gregory Howard (Republican); ▌Fred Clayton (Republican); ▌Louis Ligon (Republican); ▌Clara Richardson-Olguin (Republican)	Democratic hold
8	8	R +29.3	Russ Goodman	Republican	2021	Yes	▌ ✓ Russ Goodman (Republican)	Republican hold
9	9	D +20.4	Nikki Merritt	Democratic	2021	Yes	▌ ✓ Nikki Merritt (Democratic); ▌Michael Gargiulo (Republican)	Democratic hold
10	10	D +69.9	Emanuel Jones	Democratic	2005	Yes	▌ ✓ Emanuel Jones (Democratic); ▌Furquan Stafford (Republican)	Democratic hold
11	11	R +29.2	Sam Watson	Republican	2023	Yes	▌ ✓ Sam Watson (Republican)	Republican hold
12	12	D +16.2	Freddie Sims	Democratic	2009	Yes	▌ ✓ Freddie Sims (Democratic)	Democratic hold
13	13	R +40.4	Carden Summers	Republican	2020	Yes	▌ ✓ Carden Summers (Republican)	Republican hold
14	14	D +19.9	Josh McLaurin	Democratic	2023	Yes	▌ ✓ Josh McLaurin (Democratic)	Democratic hold
15	15	D +33.2	Ed Harbison	Democratic	1993	Yes	▌ ✓ Ed Harbison (Democratic)	Democratic hold
16	16	R +27.9	Marty Harbin	Republican	2015	Yes	▌ ✓ Marty Harbin (Republican); ▌Amili Blake (Democratic)	Republican hold
17	17	D +48.4	Gail Davenport	Democratic	2011	Yes	▌ ✓ Gail Davenport (Democratic)	Democratic hold
18	18	R +22.2	John F. Kennedy	Republican	2015	Yes	▌ ✓ John F. Kennedy (Republican)	Republican hold
19	19	R +49.3	Blake Tillery	Republican	2017	Yes	▌ ✓ Blake Tillery (Republican)	Republican hold
20	20	R +31.0	Larry Walker III	Republican	2015	Yes	▌ ✓ Larry Walker III (Republican); Republican primary: ▌ ✓ Larry Walker III (Republican); ▌Tori Branum (Republican)	Republican hold
21	21	R +32.2	Brandon Beach	Republican	2013	Yes	▌ ✓ Brandon Beach (Republican); ▌Lillia Michelle Lionel (Democratic); Democratic primary: ▌ ✓ Lillia Michelle Lionel (Democratic); ▌Tracey Verhoeven (Democratic)	Republican hold
22	22	D +41.9	Harold V. Jones II	Democratic	2015	Yes	▌ ✓ Harold V. Jones II (Democratic)	Democratic hold
23	23	R +14.7	Max Burns	Republican	2021	Yes	▌ ✓ Max Burns (Republican); ▌Shayna Boston (Democratic)	Republican hold
24	24	R +34.1	Lee Anderson	Republican	2017	Yes	▌ ✓ Lee Anderson (Republican)	Republican hold
25	25	R +23.7	Rick Williams	Republican	2023	Yes	▌ ✓ Rick Williams (Republican); Republican primary: ▌ ✓ Rick Williams (Republican); ▌Leland Jake Olinger (Republican)	Republican hold
26	26	D +28.4	David Lucas	Democratic	2013	Yes	▌ ✓ David Lucas (Democratic)	Democratic hold
27	27	R +37.9	Greg Dolezal	Republican	2019	Yes	▌ ✓ Greg Dolezal (Republican); ▌Hamza Nazir (Democratic)	Republican hold
28	28	D +48.7	Donzella James	Democratic	2009	Yes	▌ ✓ Donzella James (Democratic); Democratic primary: ▌ ✓ Donzella James (Democratic); ▌Terracia Tee Wilkinson (Democratic)	Democratic hold
29	29	R +24.7	Randy Robertson	Republican	2019	Yes	▌ ✓ Randy Robertson (Republican); ▌Ellen T Wright (Democratic)	Republican hold
30	30	R +29.2	Tim Bearden	Republican	2024	Yes	▌ ✓ Tim Bearden (Republican); ▌Wanda Cooper (Democratic)	Republican hold
31	31	R +33.0	Jason Anavitarte	Republican	2021	Yes	▌ ✓ Jason Anavitarte (Republican)	Republican hold
32	32	R +12.7	Kay Kirkpatrick	Republican	2017	Yes	▌ ✓ Kay Kirkpatrick (Republican); Republican primary: ▌ ✓ Kay Kirkpatrick (Republican); ▌Ben Paul Fremer (Republican)	Republican hold
33	33	D +30.2	Michael Rhett	Democratic	2015	Yes	▌ ✓ Michael Rhett (Democratic); Democratic primary: ▌ ✓ Michael Rhett (Democratic); ▌Euriel Hemmerly (Democratic)	Democratic hold
34	34	D +64.7	Valencia Seay	Democratic	2003	No	▌ ✓ Kenya Wicks (Democratic); ▌Andrew E. Honeycutt (Republican); Democratic primary: ▌Valencia Stovall (Democratic); ▌ ✓ Kenya Wicks (Democratic); ▌Herman "Drew" Andrews (Democratic); ▌Tyriq T Jackson (Democratic); ▌Melody Totten (Democratic); ▌Daymetrie Williams (Democratic); ▌Xe Ross (Democratic)	Democratic hold
35	35	D +57.1	Jason Esteves	Democratic	2023	Yes	▌ ✓ Jason Esteves (Democratic)	Democratic hold
36	36	D +78.2	Nan Orrock	Democratic	2007	Yes	▌ ✓ Nan Orrock (Democratic); Democratic primary: ▌ ✓ Nan Orrock (Democratic); ▌Michel Powell (Democratic)	Democratic hold
37	37	R +10.7	Ed Setzler	Republican	2023	Yes	▌ ✓ Ed Setzler (Republican); ▌Vanessa Ella Parker (Democratic); Democratic primary: ▌ ✓ Vanessa Ella Parker (Democratic); ▌Sadia Ali (Democratic)	Republican hold
38	38	D +56.4	RaShaun Kemp	Democratic	1999	No	▌ ✓ Rashaun Kemp (Democratic); Democratic primary: ▌ ✓ Rashaun Kemp (Democratic); ▌Ralph Long III (Democratic); ▌Nate Green (Democratic); ▌Nkoyo Effiong Lewis (Democratic); ▌Darryl "Dj" Terry Ii (Democratic); ▌Richard N Wright (Democratic)	Democratic hold
39	39	D +71.1	Sonya Halpern	Democratic	2021	Yes	▌ ✓ Sonya Halpern (Democratic)	Democratic hold
40	40	D +29.3	Sally Harrell	Democratic	2019	Yes	▌ ✓ Sally Harrell (Democratic); ▌Amelia K. Siamomua (Republican); Democratic primary: ▌ ✓ Sally Harrell (Democratic); ▌David Lubin (Democratic)	Democratic hold
41	41	D +68.8	Kim Jackson	Democratic	2021	Yes	▌ ✓ Kim Jackson (Democratic); ▌Jeff Newlin (Republican); Democratic primary: ▌ ✓ Kim Jackson (Democratic); ▌Tyion Fields (Democratic)	Democratic hold
42	42	R +18.4	Brian Strickland	Republican	2018	Yes	▌ ✓ Brian Strickland (Republican); ▌Kacy D Morgan (Democratic)	Republican hold
43	43	D +49.3	Tonya Anderson	Democratic	2017	Yes	▌ ✓ Tonya Anderson (Democratic)	Democratic hold
44	44	D +79.0	Elena Parent	Democratic	2015	Yes	▌ ✓ Elena Parent (Democratic); Democratic primary: ▌ ✓ Elena Parent (Democratic); ▌Nadine Thomas (Democratic)	Democratic hold
45	45	R +16.9	Clint Dixon	Republican	2021	Yes	▌ ✓ Clint Dixon (Republican)	Republican hold
46	46	R +18.2	Bill Cowsert	Republican	2007	Yes	▌ ✓ Bill Cowsert (Republican); ▌Gareth Fenley (Democratic)	Republican hold
47	47	R +18.3	Frank Ginn	Republican	2011	Yes	▌ ✓ Frank Ginn (Republican); ▌Conolus Scott (Democratic); Republican primary: ▌ ✓ Frank Ginn (Republican); ▌Ross Harvin (Republican)	Republican hold
48	48	R +3.2	Shawn Still	Republican	2023	Yes	▌ ✓ Shawn Still (Republican); ▌Ashwin Ramaswami (Democratic)	Republican hold
49	49	R +44.1	Shelly Echols	Republican	2023	No	▌ ✓ Drew Echols (Republican); Republican primary: ▌ ✓ Drew Echols (Republican); ▌Josh Clark (Republican)	Republican hold
50	50	R +62.2	Bo Hatchett	Republican	2021	Yes	▌ ✓ Bo Hatchett (Republican); ▌June Krise (Democratic)	Republican hold
51	51	R +64.2	Steve Gooch	Republican	2011	Yes	▌ ✓ Steve Gooch (Republican)	Republican hold
52	52	R +46.2	Chuck Hufstetler	Republican	2013	Yes	▌ ✓ Chuck Hufstetler (Republican)	Republican hold
53	53	R +58.9	Colton Moore	Republican	2023	Yes	▌ ✓ Colton Moore (Republican); ▌Bart Alexander Bryant (Democratic); Republican primary: ▌ ✓ Colton Moore (Republican); ▌Angela Pence (Republican)	Republican hold
54	54	R +52.5	Chuck Payne	Republican	2017	Yes	▌ ✓ Chuck Payne (Republican)	Republican hold
55	55	D +56.0	Gloria Butler	Democratic	1999	No	▌ ✓ Randal Mangham (Democratic); ▌Mary Williams Benefield (Republican); Democratic primary: ▌ ✓ Randal Mangham (Democratic); ▌Iris Hamilton (Democratic); ▌Robin Biro (Democratic); ▌Verdaillia Turner (Democratic); ▌Osborn Murray III (Democratic)	Democratic hold
56	56	R +12.3	John Albers	Republican	2011	Yes	▌ ✓ John Albers (Republican); ▌JD Jordan (Democratic)	Republican hold

== Detailed results ==
=== District 1 ===
1st District Republican primary details

Republican Primary, 1st District
Party	Candidate	Votes	%
Republican	Ben Watson (incumbent)	8,264	61.67
Republican	Beth Majeroni	5,137	38.33
Total votes		13,401	100.00

2024 Georgia Senate election, 1st District
Party	Candidate	Votes	%
Republican	Ben Watson (Incumbent)	76,992	100.0
Republican hold			

=== District 2 ===
2024 Georgia Senate election, 2nd District
Party	Candidate	Votes	%
Democratic	Derek Mallow (Incumbent)	65,049	100.00
Democratic hold			

=== District 3 ===
2024 Georgia Senate election, 3rd District
Party	Candidate	Votes	%
Republican	Mike Hodges (Incumbent)	77,114	100.0
Republican hold			

=== District 4 ===
2024 Georgia Senate election, 4th District
Party	Candidate	Votes	%
Republican	Billy Hickman (Incumbent)	74,309	100.0
Republican hold			

=== District 5 ===
2024 Georgia Senate election, 5th District
Party	Candidate	Votes	%
Democratic	Sheikh Rahman (Incumbent)	32,283	67.61
Republican	Lisa Babbage	15,511	32.39
Total votes		47,893	100.0
Democratic hold			

=== District 6 ===
2024 Georgia Senate election, 6th District
Party	Candidate	Votes	%
Republican	Matt Brass (Incumbent)	77,875	72.31
Democratic	Jenny Enderlin	29,819	27.69
Total votes		107,694	100.0
Republican hold			

=== District 7 ===
7th District Republican primary details

Republican Primary
Party	Candidate	Votes	%
Republican	J. Gregory Howard	2,017	34.61
Republican	Fred Clayton	1,761	30.22
Republican	Clara Richardson-Olguin	1,416	24.30
Republican	Louis Ligon	633	10.86
Total votes		5,827	100.00

Republican Primary Runoff
Party	Candidate	Votes	%
Republican	J. Gregory Howard	1,349	61.60
Republican	Fred Clayton	841	38.40
Total votes		2,190	100.00

2024 Georgia Senate election, 7th District
Party	Candidate	Votes	%
Democratic	Nabilah Islam Parkes (Incumbent)	46,748	55.02
Republican	J. Gregory Howard	38,222	44.98
Total votes		84,970	100.0
Democratic hold			

=== District 8 ===
2024 Georgia Senate election, 8th District
Party	Candidate	Votes	%
Republican	Russ Goodman (Incumbent)	64,698	100.00
Republican hold			

=== District 9 ===
2024 Georgia Senate election, 9th District
Party	Candidate	Votes	%
Democratic	Nikki Merritt (Incumbent)	52,451	59.95
Republican	Michael Gargiulo	35,036	40.05
Total votes		87,487	100.0
Democratic hold			

=== District 10 ===
2024 Georgia Senate election, 10th District
Party	Candidate	Votes	%
Democratic	Emanuel D. Jones (Incumbent)	85,131	85.31
Republican	Furquan Stafford	14,658	14.69
Total votes		99,789	100.0
Democratic hold			

=== District 11 ===
2024 Georgia Senate election, 11th District
Party	Candidate	Votes	%
Republican	Sam Watson (Incumbent)	65,156	100.00
Republican hold			

=== District 12 ===
2024 Georgia Senate election, 12th District
Party	Candidate	Votes	%
Democratic	Freddie Powell Sims (Incumbent)	62,128	100.00
Democratic hold			

=== District 13 ===
2024 Georgia Senate election, 13th District
Party	Candidate	Votes	%
Republican	Carden H. Summers (Incumbent)	69,318	100.00
Republican hold			

=== District 14 ===
2024 Georgia Senate election, 14th District
Party	Candidate	Votes	%
Democratic	Josh McLaurin (Incumbent)	72,408	100.00
Democratic hold			

=== District 15 ===
2024 Georgia Senate election, 15th District
Party	Candidate	Votes	%
Democratic	Ed Harbison (Incumbent)	54,421	100.00
Democratic hold			

=== District 16 ===
2024 Georgia Senate election, 16th District
Party	Candidate	Votes	%
Republican	Marty Harbin (Incumbent)	71,842	65.77
Democratic	Amili Blake	37,388	34.23
Total votes		109,230	100.0
Republican hold			

=== District 17 ===
2024 Georgia Senate election, 17th District
Party	Candidate	Votes	%
Democratic	Gail Davenport (Incumbent)	80,988	100.00
Democratic hold			

=== District 18 ===
2024 Georgia Senate election, 18th District
Party	Candidate	Votes	%
Republican	John F. Kennedy (Incumbent)	80,984	100.00
Republican hold			

=== District 19 ===
2024 Georgia Senate election, 19th District
Party	Candidate	Votes	%
Republican	Blake Tillery (Incumbent)	65,328	100.00
Republican hold			

=== District 20 ===
20th District Republican primary details

Republican Primary, 20th District
Party	Candidate	Votes	%
Republican	Larry Walker (incumbent)	16,613	76.57
Republican	Tori Branum	5,083	23.43
Total votes		21,696	100.00

2024 Georgia Senate election, 20th District
Party	Candidate	Votes	%
Republican	Larry Walker (Incumbent)	79,290	100.00
Republican hold			

=== District 21 ===
21st District Democratic primary details

Democratic Primary, 21st District
Party	Candidate	Votes	%
Democratic	Lillia Michelle Lionel	2,764	51.60
Democratic	Tracey Verhoeven	2,593	48.40
Total votes		5,357	100.00

2024 Georgia Senate election, 21st District
Party	Candidate	Votes	%
Republican	Brandon Beach (Incumbent)	81,481	70.35
Democratic	Lillia Michelle Lionel	34,349	29.65
Total votes		115,830	100.0
Republican hold			

=== District 22 ===
2024 Georgia Senate election, 22nd District
Party	Candidate	Votes	%
Democratic	Harold V. Jones, III (Incumbent)	63,914	100.00
Democratic hold			

=== District 23 ===
2024 Georgia Senate election, 23rd District
Party	Candidate	Votes	%
Republican	Max Burns (Incumbent)	54,455	61.84
Democratic	Shanya Boston	33,603	38.16
Total votes		88,058	100.00
Republican hold			

=== District 24 ===
2024 Georgia Senate election, 24th District
Party	Candidate	Votes	%
Republican	Lee Anderson (Incumbent)	93,176	100.00
Republican hold			

=== District 25 ===
25th District Republican primary details

Republican Primary, 25th District
Party	Candidate	Votes	%
Republican	Ricky “Rick” Williams (incumbent)	11,583	87.64
Republican	Leland Jake Olinger	1,634	12.36
Total votes		13,217	100.00

2024 Georgia Senate election, 25th District
Party	Candidate	Votes	%
Republican	Ricky “Rick” Williams (Incumbent)	80,234	100.00
Republican hold			

=== District 26 ===
2024 Georgia Senate election, 26th District
Party	Candidate	Votes	%
Democratic	David E. Lucas, Sr. (Incumbent)	60,536	100.00
Democratic hold			

=== District 27 ===
2024 Georgia Senate election, 27th District
Party	Candidate	Votes	%
Republican	Greg Dolezal (Incumbent)	76,783	73.27
Democratic	Hamza Nazir	28,008	26.73
Total votes		104,791	100.0
Republican hold			

=== District 28 ===
28th District Democratic primary details

Democratic Primary, 28th District
Party	Candidate	Votes	%
Democratic	Donzella James (incumbent)	14,128	75.09
Democratic	Terracia “Tee” Wilkinson	4,686	24.91
Total votes		18,841	100.00

2024 Georgia Senate election, 28th District
Party	Candidate	Votes	%
Democratic	Donzella James (Incumbent)	79,712	100.0
Democratic hold			

=== District 29 ===
2024 Georgia Senate election, 29th District
Party	Candidate	Votes	%
Republican	Randy Robertson (Incumbent)	62,859	65.23
Democratic	Ellen T. Wright	33,500	34.77
Total votes		96,359	100.0
Republican hold			

=== District 30 ===
2024 Georgia Senate election, 30th District
Party	Candidate	Votes	%
Republican	Timothy J. Bearden (Incumbent)	63,158	65.05
Democratic	Wanda Cooper	33,937	34.95
Total votes		97,095	100.0
Republican hold			

=== District 31 ===
2024 Georgia Senate election, 31st District
Party	Candidate	Votes	%
Republican	Jason Anavitarte (Incumbent)	81,415	100.00
Republican hold			

=== District 32 ===
32nd District Republican primary details

Republican Primary, 32nd District
Party	Candidate	Votes	%
Republican	Kay Kirkpatrick (incumbent)	9,361	77.36
Republican	Ben Paul Fremer	2,739	22.64
Total votes		12,100	100.00

2024 Georgia Senate election, 32nd District
Party	Candidate	Votes	%
Republican	Kay Kirkpatrick (Incumbent)	82,399	100.00
Republican hold			

=== District 33 ===
33rd District Democratic primary details

Democratic Primary, 33rd District
Party	Candidate	Votes	%
Democratic	Michael Doc Rhett (incumbent)	7,455	68.61
Democratic	Euriel Hemmerly	3,410	31.39
Total votes		10,865	100.00

2024 Georgia Senate election, 33rd District
Party	Candidate	Votes	%
Democratic	Michael Doc Rhett (Incumbent)	65,983	100.00
Democratic hold			

=== District 34 ===
34th District Democratic primary details

Democratic Primary
Party	Candidate	Votes	%
Democratic	Valencia Stovall	6,242	46.45
Democratic	Kenya Wicks	2,037	15.16
Democratic	Herman “Drew” Andrews	1,933	14.38
Democratic	Tyriq T Jackson	1,874	13.95
Democratic	Melody Totten	545	4.06
Democratic	D. “Cowboy” Williams	449	3.34
Democratic	Xe Ross	358	2.66
Total votes		13,438	100.00

Democratic Primary Runoff
Party	Candidate	Votes	%
Democratic	Kenya Wicks	4,904	65.77
Democratic	Valencia Stovall	2,552	34.23
Total votes		7,456	100.00

2024 Georgia Senate election, 34th District
Party	Candidate	Votes	%
Democratic	Kenya Wicks	56,911	81.95
Republican	Andrew E. Honeycutt	12,537	18.05
Total votes		69,448	100.0
Democratic hold			

=== District 35 ===
2024 Georgia Senate election, 35th District
Party	Candidate	Votes	%
Democratic	Jason Esteves (Incumbent)	82,713	100.00
Democratic hold			

=== District 36 ===
36th District Democratic primary details

Democratic Primary, 36th District
Party	Candidate	Votes	%
Democratic	Nan Orrock (incumbent)	14,287	82.81
Democratic	Michel Powell	2,965	17.19
Total votes		17,252	100.00

2024 Georgia Senate election, 36th District
Party	Candidate	Votes	%
Democratic	Nan Orrock (Incumbent)	82,021	100.00
Democratic hold			

=== District 37 ===
37th District Democratic primary details

Democratic Primary, 37th District
Party	Candidate	Votes	%
Democratic	Vanessa Ella Parker	5,036	50.87
Democratic	Sadia Ali	4,863	49.13
Total votes		9,899	100.00

2024 Georgia Senate election, 37th District
Party	Candidate	Votes	%
Republican	Ed Setzler (Incumbent)	65,243	57.48
Democratic	Vanessa Ella Parker	48,270	42.52
Total votes		113,513	100.0
Republican hold			

=== District 38 ===
38th District Democratic primary details

Democratic Primary
Party	Candidate	Votes	%
Democratic	RaShaun Kemp	4,378	24.31
Democratic	Ralph Long, III	4,128	22.92
Democratic	Nate Green	3,654	20.29
Democratic	Nkoyo Effiong Lewis	3,201	17.77
Democratic	Darryl “DJ” Terry, II	1,516	8.42
Democratic	Richard N Wright	1,133	6.29
Total votes		18,010	100.00

Democratic Primary Runoff
Party	Candidate	Votes	%
Democratic	RaShaun Kemp	2,408	59.69
Democratic	Ralph Long, III	1,626	40.31
Total votes		4,034	100.00

2024 Georgia Senate election, 38th District
Party	Candidate	Votes	%
Democratic	RaShaun Kemp	81,270	100.00
Democratic hold			

=== District 39 ===
2024 Georgia Senate election, 39th District
Party	Candidate	Votes	%
Democratic	Sonya Halpern (Incumbent)	77,219	100.00
Democratic hold			

=== District 40 ===
40th District Democratic primary details

Democratic Primary, 40th District
Party	Candidate	Votes	%
Democratic	Sally Harrell (incumbent)	8,105	70.84
Democratic	David Lubin	3,337	29.16
Total votes		11,442	100.00

2024 Georgia Senate election, 40th District
Party	Candidate	Votes	%
Democratic	Sally Harrell (Incumbent)	50,196	62.64
Republican	Amelia K. Siamomua	29,937	37.36
Total votes		80,133	100.0
Democratic hold			

=== District 41 ===
2024 Georgia Senate election, 41st District
Party	Candidate	Votes	%
Democratic	Kim Jackson (Incumbent)	62,311	81.82
Republican	Jeff Newlin	13,846	18.18
Total votes		76,157	100.0
Democratic hold			

=== District 42 ===
2024 Georgia Senate election, 42nd District
Party	Candidate	Votes	%
Republican	Brian Strickland (Incumbent)	62,551	58.24
Democratic	Kacy D. Morgan	44,854	41.76
Total votes		107,405	100.0
Republican hold			

=== District 43 ===
2024 Georgia Senate election, 43rd District
Party	Candidate	Votes	%
Democratic	Tonya P. Anderson (Incumbent)	80,092	100.00
Democratic hold			

=== District 44 ===
44th District Democratic primary details

Democratic Primary, 44th District
Party	Candidate	Votes	%
Democratic	Elena Parent (incumbent)	18,138	73.59
Democratic	Nadine Thomas	6,510	26.41
Total votes		24,648	100.00

2024 Georgia Senate election, 44th District
Party	Candidate	Votes	%
Democratic	Elena Parent (Incumbent)	89,952	100.00
Democratic hold			

=== District 45 ===
2024 Georgia Senate election, 45th District
Party	Candidate	Votes	%
Republican	Clint Dixon (Incumbent)	76,563	100.00
Republican hold			

=== District 46 ===
2024 Georgia Senate election, 46th District
Party	Candidate	Votes	%
Republican	Bill Cowsert (Incumbent)	64,614	63.67
Democratic	Gareth Fenley	36,870	36.33
Total votes		101,484	100.0
Republican hold			

=== District 47 ===
47th District Republican primary details

Republican Primary, 47th District
Party	Candidate	Votes	%
Republican	Frank Ginn (incumbent)	8,710	62.20
Republican	Ross Harvin	5,294	37.80
Total votes		14,004	100.00

2024 Georgia Senate election, 47th District
Party	Candidate	Votes	%
Republican	Frank Ginn (Incumbent)	62,063	62.61
Democratic	Conolus Scott	37,064	37.39
Total votes		99,127	100.0
Republican hold			

=== District 48 ===
2024 Georgia Senate election, 48th District
Party	Candidate	Votes	%
Republican	Shawn Still (Incumbent)	51,773	53.58
Democratic	Ashwin Ramaswami	44,863	46.42
Total votes		96,636	100.0
Republican hold			

=== District 49 ===
49th District Republican primary details

Republican Primary, 49th District
Party	Candidate	Votes	%
Republican	Drew Echols	10,135	52.74
Republican	Josh Clark	9,082	47.26
Total votes		19,217	100.00

2024 Georgia Senate election, 49th District
Party	Candidate	Votes	%
Republican	Drew Echols	83,710	100.00
Republican hold			

=== District 50 ===
2024 Georgia Senate election, 50th District
Party	Candidate	Votes	%
Republican	Bo Hatchett (Incumbent)	82,870	83.98
Democratic	June Krise	15,811	16.02
Total votes		98,681	100.0
Republican hold			

=== District 51 ===
2024 Georgia Senate election, 51st District
Party	Candidate	Votes	%
Republican	Steve Gooch (Incumbent)	105,290	100.00
Republican hold			

=== District 52 ===
2024 Georgia Senate election, 52nd District
Party	Candidate	Votes	%
Republican	Chuck Hufstetler (Incumbent)	80,598	100.00
Republican hold			

=== District 53 ===
53rd District Republican primary details

Republican Primary, 53rd District
Party	Candidate	Votes	%
Republican	Colton Moore (incumbent)	15,687	70.44
Republican	Angela Pence	6,583	29.56
Total votes		22,270	100.00

2024 Georgia Senate election, 53rd District
Party	Candidate	Votes	%
Republican	Colton Moore (Incumbent)	70,397	78.77
Democratic	Bart Alexander Bryant	18,970	21.23
Total votes		89,367	100.0
Republican hold			

=== District 54 ===
2024 Georgia Senate election, 54th District
Party	Candidate	Votes	%
Republican	Chuck Payne (Incumbent)	69,447	100.00
Republican hold			

=== District 55 ===
55th District Democratic primary details

Democratic Primary
Party	Candidate	Votes	%
Democratic	Randal Mangham	5,308	31.21
Democratic	Iris Knight-Hamilton	3,836	22.56
Democratic	Robin Biro	3,656	21.50
Democratic	Verdaillia Turner	3,382	19.89
Democratic	Osborn Murray, III	824	4.85
Total votes		17,006	100.00

Democratic Primary Runoff
Party	Candidate	Votes	%
Democratic	Randal Mangham	4,949	54.20
Democratic	Iris Knight-Hamilton	4,182	45.80
Total votes		9.131	100.00

2024 Georgia Senate election, 55th District
Party	Candidate	Votes	%
Democratic	Randal Mangham	69,259	75.97
Republican	Mary Williams Benefield	21,907	24.03
Total votes		91,166	100.0
Democratic hold			

=== District 56 ===
2024 Georgia Senate election, 56th District
Party	Candidate	Votes	%
Republican	John Albers (Incumbent)	72,392	61.23
Democratic	JD Jordan	45,836	38.77
Total votes		118,228	100.0
Republican hold			

== See also ==
- 2024 Georgia state elections
- List of Georgia state legislatures
