= 2022 Georgia State Senate election =

- November 8, 2022

All 56 seats in the Georgia State Senate 29 (Note: Because the Lieutenant Governor has the power to break ties in the Senate, a Senate majority requires either 29 seats or 28 seats with control of the Lieutenant Governor's office.) seats needed for a majority
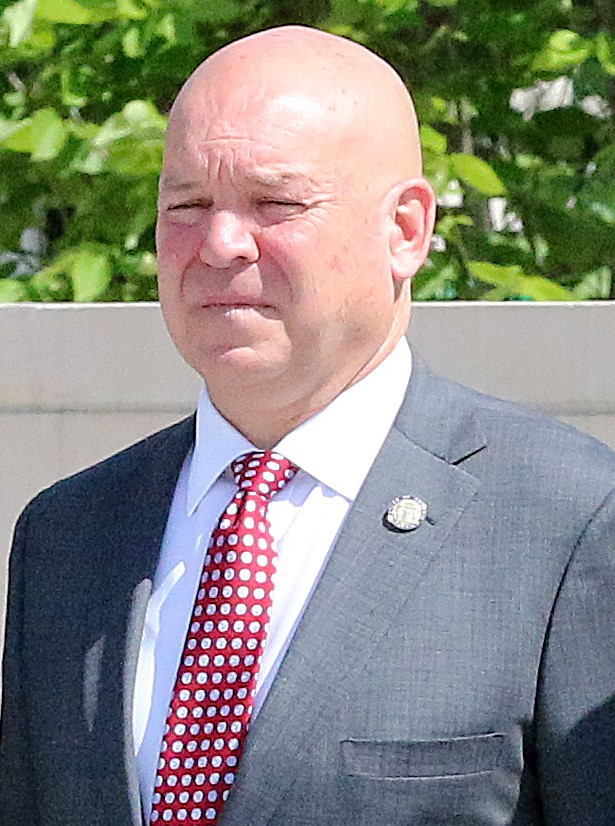

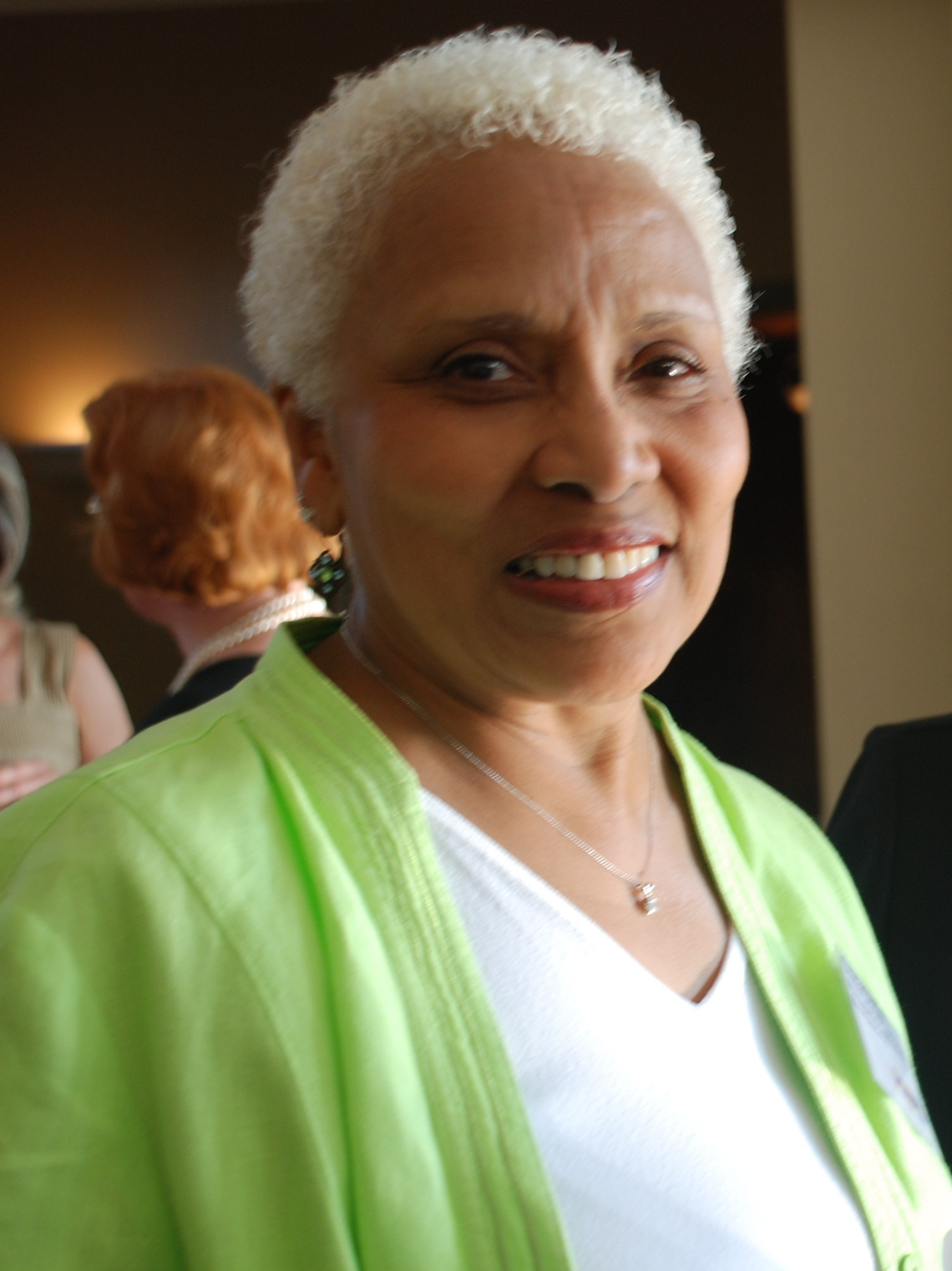
	Majority party	Minority party
Leader	Mike Dugan (stepped down)	Gloria Butler
Party	Republican	Democratic
Leader's seat	30th	55th
Last election	34	22
Seats after	33	23
Seat change	▼1	▲1
Popular vote	1,985,311	1,607,215
Percentage	55.26%	44.74%
Swing	▲0.68%	▼0.68%
- Republican gain Democratic gain Republican hold Democratic hold 50–60% 60–70% 70–80% 80–90% >90% 50–60% 60–70% 70–80% 80–90% >90%
Majority leader before election
Mike Dugan
Republican
Elected Majority leader
Steve Gooch
Republican

Elections to the Georgia State Senate were held on November 8, 2022, alongside the other 2022 United States elections. All 56 seats were up for election.

Democrats gained one seat, decreasing the Republican majority to 33 out of 56 seats.

== Retirements ==
=== Democrats ===
1. District 2: Lester Jackson retired to run for Commissioner of Labor.
2. District 6: Jen Jordan retired to run for Attorney General.
3. District 48: Michelle Au retired to run for state representative from District 50.

=== Republicans ===
1. District 3: Sheila McNeill retired.
2. District 7: Tyler Harper retired to run for Commissioner of Agriculture.
3. District 14: Bruce Thompson retired to run for Commissioner of Labor.
4. District 25: Burt Jones retired to run for Lieutenant Governor.
5. District 37: Lindsey Tippins retired.
6. District 49: Butch Miller retired to run for Lieutenant Governor.
7. District 53: Jeff Mullis retired.

== Predictions ==
Source	Ranking	As of
Sabato's Crystal Ball	Likely R	May 19, 2022

== Closest races ==
Seats where the margin of victory was under 10%:

1. State Senate district 7, 5.68% (gain)
2. State Senate district 14, 9.38% (gain)

== Results ==
Results
District	Result	Republican			Democratic			Total votes
District	Result	Candidate	Votes	Share	Candidate	Votes	Share	Total votes
1	Rep. hold	Ben Watson (inc.)	43,080	61.38%	James “Jay” Jones	27,106	38.62%	70,186
2	Dem. hold	Clinton Young	16,203	28.05%	Derek Mallow	41,553	71.95%	57,556
3	Rep. hold	Mike Hodges	54,807	100%	did not contest			54,807
4	Rep. hold	Billy Hickman (inc.)	53,563	100%	did not contest			53,563
5	Dem. hold	did not contest			Sheikh Rahman (inc.)	26,340	100%	26,340
6	Dem. hold	Fred Glass	34,607	43.43%	Jason Esteves	45,076	56.57%	79,683
7	Dem. gain	Josh McKay	29,148	47.16%	Nabilah Islam	32,665	52.84%	61,813
8	Rep. hold	Russ Goodman (inc.)	47,458	100%	did not contest			47,458
9	Dem. hold	did not contest			Nikki Merritt (inc.)	47,638	100%	47,638
10	Dem. hold	did not contest			Emanuel Jones (inc.)	68,240	100%	68,240
11	Rep. hold	Dean Burke (inc.)	49,591	100%	did not contest			49,591
12	Dem. hold	did not contest			Freddie Powell Sims (inc.)	48,502	100%	48,502
13	Rep. hold	Carden Summers (inc.)	54,014	100%	did not contest			54,014
14	Dem. gain	Liz Hausmann	34,257	45.31%	Josh McLaurin	41,353	54.69%	75,610
15	Dem. hold	did not contest			Ed Harbison (inc.)	39,953	100%	39,953
16	Rep. hold	Marty Harbin (inc.)	57,965	68.18%	Pingke Dubignon	27,048	31.82%	85,013
17	Rep. hold	Brian Strickland (inc.)	49,532	61.56%	Kacy D. Morgan	30,929	38.44%	80,461
18	Rep. hold	John F. Kennedy (inc.)	49,581	64.43%	Chris Benton	27,372	35.57%	76,953
19	Rep. hold	Blake Tillery (inc.)	45,431	78.68%	Michael “Buckle” Moore	12,308	21.32%	57,739
20	Rep. hold	Larry Walker (inc.)	59,824	100%	did not contest			59,824
21	Rep. hold	Brandon Beach (inc.)	73,600	100%	did not contest			73,600
22	Dem. hold	Andrew Danielson	17,077	29.57%	Harold V. Jones II (inc.)	40,676	70.43%	57,753
23	Rep. hold	Max Burns (inc.)	53,320	100%	did not contest			53,320
24	Rep. hold	Lee Anderson (inc.)	72,370	100%	did not contest			72,370
25	Rep. hold	Rick Williams	46,289	61.66%	Valerie Rodgers	28,777	38.34%	75,066
26	Dem. hold	did not contest			David E. Lucas Sr. (inc.)	45,293	100%	45,293
27	Rep. hold	Greg Dolezal (inc.)	58,096	73.87%	Brett Binion	20,551	26.13%	78,647
28	Rep. hold	Matt Brass (inc.)	67,216	100%	did not contest			67,216
29	Rep. hold	Randy Robertson (inc.)	48,339	66.25%	Ellen Wright	24,628	33.75%	72,967
30	Rep. hold	Mike Dugan (inc.)	59,251	100%	did not contest			59,251
31	Rep. hold	Jason Anavitarte (inc.)	57,843	100%	did not contest			57,843
32	Rep. hold	Kay Kirkpatrick (inc.)	48,081	61.59%	Sylvia L. Bennett	29,982	38.41%	78,063
33	Dem. hold	did not contest			Michael Rhett (inc.)	47,887	100%	47,887
34	Dem. hold	Tommy Smith	8,689	16.29%	Valencia Seay (inc.)	44,660	83.71%	53,341
35	Dem. hold	did not contest			Donzella James (inc.)	62,015	100%	62,015
36	Dem. hold	did not contest			Nan Orrock (inc.)	63,848	100%	63,848
37	Rep. hold	Ed Setzler	51,953	58.84%	Vanessa Parker	36,341	41.16%	88,294
38	Dem. hold	did not contest			Horacena Tate (inc.)	64,418	100%	64,418
39	Dem. hold	did not contest			Sonya Halpern (inc.)	60,401	100%	60,401
40	Dem. hold	Austin McDonald	24,870	38.43%	Sally Harrell (inc.)	39,839	61.57%	64,709
41	Dem. hold	Jayre Jones	11,195	17.85%	Kim Jackson (inc.)	51,512	82.15%	62,707
42	Dem. hold	did not contest			Elena Parent (inc.)	77,961	100%	77,961
43	Dem. hold	Melanie Williams	17,128	24.95%	Tonya Anderson (inc.)	51,534	75.05%	68,662
44	Dem. hold	did not contest			Gail Davenport (inc.)	61,768	100%	61,768
45	Rep. hold	Clint Dixon (inc.)	41,416	61.29%	Matielyn Jones	26,163	38.71%	67,579
46	Rep. hold	Bill Cowsert (inc.)	48,555	64.02%	Andrew Ferguson	27,286	35.98%	75,841
47	Rep. hold	Frank Ginn (inc.)	44,530	62.00%	Conolus Scott Jr.	27,287	38.00%	71,817
48	Rep. gain	Shawn Still	41,464	56.72%	Josh Uddin	31,635	43.28%	73,099
49	Rep. hold	Shelly Echols	53,106	75.84%	Jody Cooley	16,919	24.16%	70,025
50	Rep. hold	Bo Hatchett (inc.)	62,105	84.78%	Paulette Williams	11,551	15.22%	73,256
51	Rep. hold	Steve Gooch (inc.)	79,579	100%	did not contest			79,579
52	Rep. hold	Chuck Hufstetler (inc.)	57,785	100%	did not contest			57,785
53	Rep. hold	Colton Moore	56,221	100%	did not contest			56,221
54	Rep. hold	Chuck Payne (inc.)	48,051	100%	did not contest			48,051
55	Dem. hold	did not contest			Gloria S. Butler (inc.)	62,044	100%	62,044
56	Rep. hold	John Albers (inc.)	58,121	61.65%	Patrick Thompson	36,156	38.35%	94,277

Due to redistricting, District 7 moved from southern Georgia to the Atlanta region.

== See also ==
- List of Georgia state legislatures
