= 2020 Georgia State Senate election =

- November 3, 2020

All 56 seats in the Georgia State Senate 29 (Note: Because the lieutenant governor has the power to break ties in the Senate, a Senate majority requires either 29 seats or 28 seats with control of the lieutenant governor's office.) seats needed for a majority
	Majority party	Minority party
Leader	Butch Miller	Steve Henson
Party	Republican	Democratic
Leader's seat	49th	41st
Last election	35	21
Seats after	34	22
Seat change	▼1	▲1
Popular vote	2,419,281	2,013,405
Percentage	54.58%	45.42%
Swing	▲0.16%	▼0.16%
- Results: Democratic gain Republican hold Democratic hold
President pro tempore before election
Butch Miller
Republican
Elected President pro tempore
Butch Miller
Republican

The 2020 Georgia State Senate election was held on November 3, 2020. Georgia voters elected state senators in all 56 of the state senate's districts to the 156th Georgia General Assembly for two-year terms in the Georgia State Senate. The elections coincided with the 2020 United States presidential election, 2020 United States House of Representatives elections, 2020 Georgia House of Representatives election, and more.

Democrats flipped one seat, while Republicans retained majority control of the chamber.

== Predictions ==
Source	Ranking	As of
The Cook Political Report	Lean R	October 21, 2020

== Closest races ==
Seats where the margin of victory was under 10%:

1. State Senate district 17, 1.88%
2. State Senate district 56, 2.18%
3. State Senate district 9, 3.92% (gain)

== Results ==
=== District 1 ===
2020 general election, Georgia State Senate District 1
Party	Candidate	Votes	%
Republican	Ben Watson (incumbent)	72,192	100%
Total votes		72,192	100.0%
Republican hold			

=== District 2 ===
2020 general election, Georgia State Senate District 2
Party	Candidate	Votes	%
Democratic	Lester Jackson (incumbent)	62,334	100%
Total votes		62,334	100.0%
Democratic hold			

=== District 3 ===
2020 general election, Georgia State Senate District 3
Party	Candidate	Votes	%
Republican	Sheila McNeill (incumbent)	63,891	100%
Total votes		63,891	100.0%
Republican hold			

=== District 4 ===
2020 general election, Georgia State Senate District 4
Party	Candidate	Votes	%
Republican	Billy Hickman (incumbent)	65,492	100%
Total votes		65,492	100.0%
Republican hold			

=== District 5 ===
2020 general election, Georgia State Senate District 5
Party	Candidate	Votes	%
Democratic	Sheikh Rahman (incumbent)	44,991	100%
Total votes		44,991	100.0%
Democratic hold			

=== District 6 ===
2020 general election, Georgia State Senate District 6
Party	Candidate	Votes	%
Democratic	Jen Jordan (incumbent)	62,148	61.51%
Republican	Lance Harris	38,891	38.49%
Total votes		101,039	100.0%
Democratic hold			

=== District 7 ===
2020 general election, Georgia State Senate District 7
Party	Candidate	Votes	%
Republican	Tyler Harper (incumbent)	56,433	100%
Total votes		56,433	100.0%
Republican hold			

=== District 8 ===
2020 general election, Georgia State Senate District 8
Party	Candidate	Votes	%
Republican	Russ Goodman (incumbent)	43,324	61.77%
Democratic	Treva Gear	26,819	38.23%
Total votes		70,143	100.0%
Republican hold			

=== District 9 ===
2020 general election, Georgia State Senate District 9
Party	Candidate	Votes	%
Democratic	Nikki Merritt	53,941	51.96%
Republican	P. K. Martin IV (incumbent)	49,879	48.04%
Total votes		103,820	100.0%
Democratic gain from Republican			

=== District 10 ===
2020 general election, Georgia State Senate District 10
Party	Candidate	Votes	%
Democratic	Emanuel Jones (incumbent)	84,994	100%
Total votes		84,994	100.0%
Democratic hold			

=== District 11 ===
2020 general election, Georgia State Senate District 11
Party	Candidate	Votes	%
Republican	Dean Burke (incumbent)	57,018	100%
Total votes		57,018	100.0%
Republican hold			

=== District 12 ===
2020 general election, Georgia State Senate District 12
Party	Candidate	Votes	%
Democratic	Freddie Powell Sims (incumbent)	40,396	64.18%
Republican	Tracy Taylor	22,546	35.82%
Total votes		62,942	100.0%
Democratic hold			

=== District 13 ===
2020 general election, Georgia State Senate District 13
Party	Candidate	Votes	%
Republican	Carden Summers (incumbent)	48,153	69.45%
Democratic	Mary Egler	21,178	30.55%
Total votes		69,331	100.0%
Republican hold			

=== District 14 ===
2020 general election, Georgia State Senate District 14
Party	Candidate	Votes	%
Republican	Bruce Thompson (incumbent)	66,534	70.01%
Democratic	Travis Johnson	28,505	29.99%
Total votes		95,039	100.0%
Republican hold			

=== District 15 ===
2020 general election, Georgia State Senate District 15
Party	Candidate	Votes	%
Democratic	Ed Harbison (incumbent)	48,998	100%
Total votes		48,998	100.0%
Democratic hold			

=== District 16 ===
2020 general election, Georgia State Senate District 16
Party	Candidate	Votes	%
Republican	Marty Harbin (incumbent)	65,626	68.17%
Democratic	Cinquez Jester	30,643	31.83%
Total votes		96,269	100.0%
Republican hold			

=== District 17 ===
2020 general election, Georgia State Senate District 17
Party	Candidate	Votes	%
Republican	Brian Strickland (incumbent)	52,454	50.94%
Democratic	Kelly Rose	50,513	49.06%
Total votes		102,967	100.0%
Republican hold			

=== District 18 ===
2020 general election, Georgia State Senate District 18
Party	Candidate	Votes	%
Republican	John F. Kennedy (incumbent)	71,209	100%
Total votes		71,209	100.0%
Republican hold			

=== District 19 ===
2020 general election, Georgia State Senate District 19
Party	Candidate	Votes	%
Republican	Blake Tillery (incumbent)	54,197	100%
Total votes		54,197	100.0%
Republican hold			

=== District 20 ===
2020 general election, Georgia State Senate District 20
Party	Candidate	Votes	%
Republican	Larry Walker III (incumbent)	57,946	64.96%
Democratic	Julius Newberry Johnson	31,257	35.043%
Total votes		89,203	100.0%
Republican hold			

=== District 21 ===
2020 general election, Georgia State Senate District 21
Party	Candidate	Votes	%
Republican	Brandon Beach (incumbent)	94,143	100%
Total votes		94,143	100.0%
Republican hold			

=== District 22 ===
2020 general election, Georgia State Senate District 22
Party	Candidate	Votes	%
Democratic	Harold V. Jones II (incumbent)	60,966	100%
Total votes		60,966	100.0%
Democratic hold			

=== District 23 ===
2020 general election, Georgia State Senate District 23
Party	Candidate	Votes	%
Republican	Max Burns	46,712	59.29%
Democratic	Ceretta Smith	32,069	40.71%
Total votes		78,781	100.0%
Republican hold			

=== District 24 ===
2020 general election, Georgia State Senate District 24
Party	Candidate	Votes	%
Republican	Lee Anderson (incumbent)	83,776	100%
Total votes		83,776	100.0%
Republican hold			

=== District 25 ===
2020 general election, Georgia State Senate District 25
Party	Candidate	Votes	%
Republican	Burt Jones (incumbent)	61,330	67.66%
Democratic	Veronica Brinson	29,315	32.34%
Total votes		90,645	100.0%
Republican hold			

=== District 26 ===
2020 general election, Georgia State Senate District 26
Party	Candidate	Votes	%
Democratic	David E. Lucas Sr. (incumbent)	53,421	100%
Total votes		53,421	100.0%
Democratic hold			

=== District 27 ===
2020 general election, Georgia State Senate District 27
Party	Candidate	Votes	%
Republican	Greg Dolezal (incumbent)	87,192	70.02%
Democratic	Brooke Griffiths	37,340	29.98%
Total votes		124,532	100.0%
Republican hold			

=== District 28 ===
2020 general election, Georgia State Senate District 28
Party	Candidate	Votes	%
Republican	Matt Brass (incumbent)	82,691	100%
Total votes		82,691	100.0%
Republican hold			

=== District 29 ===
2020 general election, Georgia State Senate District 29
Party	Candidate	Votes	%
Republican	Randy Robertson (incumbent)	70,161	100%
Total votes		70,161	100.0%
Republican hold			

=== District 30 ===
2020 general election, Georgia State Senate District 30
Party	Candidate	Votes	%
Republican	Mike Dugan (incumbent)	58,303	67.54%
Democratic	Montenia Edwards	28,023	32.46%
Total votes		86,326	100.0%
Republican hold			

=== District 31 ===
2020 general election, Georgia State Senate District 31
Party	Candidate	Votes	%
Republican	Jason Anavitarte	66,020	70.86%
Democratic	Tianna Smith	27,146	29.14%
Total votes		93,166	100.0%
Republican hold			

=== District 32 ===
2020 general election, Georgia State Senate District 32
Party	Candidate	Votes	%
Republican	Kay Kirkpatrick (incumbent)	63,544	55.96%
Democratic	Christine Triebsch	50,005	44.04%
Total votes		113,549	100.0%
Republican hold			

=== District 33 ===
2020 general election, Georgia State Senate District 33
Party	Candidate	Votes	%
Democratic	Michael Rhett (incumbent)	66,207	100%
Total votes		66,207	100.0%
Democratic hold			

=== District 34 ===
2020 general election, Georgia State Senate District 34
Party	Candidate	Votes	%
Democratic	Valencia Seay (incumbent)	64,110	100%
Total votes		64,110	100.0%
Democratic hold			

=== District 35 ===
2020 general election, Georgia State Senate District 35
Party	Candidate	Votes	%
Democratic	Donzella James (incumbent)	82,600	100%
Total votes		82,600	100.0%
Democratic hold			

=== District 36 ===
2020 general election, Georgia State Senate District 36
Party	Candidate	Votes	%
Democratic	Nan Orrock (incumbent)	78,536	100%
Total votes		78,536	100.0%
Democratic hold			

=== District 37 ===
2020 general election, Georgia State Senate District 37
Party	Candidate	Votes	%
Republican	Lindsey Tippins (incumbent)	60,238	57.04%
Democratic	Vanessa Parker	45,370	42.96%
Total votes		105,608	100.0%
Republican hold			

=== District 38 ===
2020 general election, Georgia State Senate District 38
Party	Candidate	Votes	%
Democratic	Horacena Tate (incumbent)	79,748	100%
Total votes		79,748	100.0%
Democratic hold			

=== District 39 ===
Incumbent senator Nikema Williams resigned to run for Georgia's 5th congressional district, which John Lewis had represented until his death. A special primary took place on November 3, 2020, and a runoff took place December 1, 2020. No Republican had filed to face Williams in the general election, so the special primary acted as the general election.

2020 general election, Georgia State Senate District 39, special primary election
Party	Candidate	Votes	%
Democratic	Sonya Halpern	31,294	45.19%
Democratic	Linda Pritchett	17,573	25.37%
Democratic	Jo Anna Potts	10,751	15.52%
Democratic	Zan Fort	9,636	13.91%
Total votes		69,254	100.0%

2020 general election, Georgia State Senate District 39, special runoff election
Party	Candidate	Votes	%
Democratic	Sonya Halpern	4,435	80.78%
Democratic	Linda Pritchett	1,055	19.22%
Total votes		5,490	100.0%
Democratic hold			

=== District 40 ===
2020 general election, Georgia State Senate District 40
Party	Candidate	Votes	%
Democratic	Sally Harrell (incumbent)	54,359	60.50%
Republican	Garry Guan	35,494	39.50%
Total votes		89,853	100.0%
Democratic hold			

=== District 41 ===
2020 general election, Georgia State Senate District 41
Party	Candidate	Votes	%
Democratic	Kim Jackson (incumbent)	58,154	79.68%
Republican	William Park Freeman	14,828	20.32%
Total votes		72,982	100.0%
Democratic hold			

=== District 42 ===
2020 general election, Georgia State Senate District 42
Party	Candidate	Votes	%
Democratic	Elena Parent (incumbent)	85,202	100%
Total votes		85,202	100.0%
Democratic hold			

=== District 43 ===
2020 general election, Georgia State Senate District 43
Party	Candidate	Votes	%
Democratic	Tonya Anderson (incumbent)	67,857	77.50%
Republican	Melanie Williams	19,703	22.50%
Total votes		87,560	100.0%
Democratic hold			

=== District 44 ===
2020 general election, Georgia State Senate District 44
Party	Candidate	Votes	%
Democratic	Gail Davenport (incumbent)	77,593	88.18%
Republican	Benjamin Brooks	10,405	11.82%
Total votes		87,998	100.0%
Democratic hold			

=== District 45 ===
2020 general election, Georgia State Senate District 45
Party	Candidate	Votes	%
Republican	Clint Dixon (incumbent)	56,965	55.60%
Democratic	Matielyn Jones	45,493	44.40%
Total votes		102,458	100.0%
Republican hold			

=== District 46 ===
2020 general election, Georgia State Senate District 46
Party	Candidate	Votes	%
Republican	Bill Cowsert (incumbent)	59,278	60.98%
Democratic	Zachary Perry	37,924	39.02%
Total votes		97,202	100.0%
Republican hold			

=== District 47 ===
2020 general election, Georgia State Senate District 47
Party	Candidate	Votes	%
Republican	Frank Ginn (incumbent)	60,282	65.86%
Democratic	Dawn Johnson	31,255	34.14%
Total votes		91,537	100.0%
Republican hold			

=== District 48 ===
2020 general election, Georgia State Senate District 48
Party	Candidate	Votes	%
Democratic	Michelle Au	49,184	56.18%
Republican	Matt Reeves	38,358	43.82%
Total votes		87,542	100.0%
Democratic hold			

=== District 49 ===
2020 general election, Georgia State Senate District 1
Party	Candidate	Votes	%
Republican	Butch Miller (incumbent)	74,684	100%
Total votes		74,684	100.0%
Republican hold			

=== District 50 ===
2020 general election, Georgia State Senate District 50
Party	Candidate	Votes	%
Republican	Bo Hatchett	71,693	83.18%
Democratic	Dee Daley	14,493	16.82%
Total votes		86,186	100.0%
Republican hold			

=== District 51 ===
2020 general election, Georgia State Senate District 51
Party	Candidate	Votes	%
Republican	Steve Gooch (incumbent)	84,767	82.79%
Democratic	June Krise	17,625	17.21%
Total votes		102,392	100.0%
Republican hold			

=== District 52 ===
2020 general election, Georgia State Senate District 52
Party	Candidate	Votes	%
Republican	Chuck Hufstetler (incumbent)	57,621	76.44%
Democratic	Charles DeYoung	17,755	23.56%
Total votes		75,376	100.0%
Republican hold			

=== District 53 ===
2020 general election, Georgia State Senate District 53
Party	Candidate	Votes	%
Republican	Jeff Mullis (incumbent)	66,064	100%
Total votes		66,064	100.0%
Republican hold			

=== District 54 ===
2020 general election, Georgia State Senate District 54
Party	Candidate	Votes	%
Republican	Chuck Payne (incumbent)	57,768	100%
Total votes		57,768	100.0%
Republican hold			

=== District 55 ===
2020 general election, Georgia State Senate District 55
Party	Candidate	Votes	%
Democratic	Gloria S. Butler (incumbent)	85,654	100%
Total votes		85,654	100.0%
Democratic hold			

=== District 56 ===
2020 general election, Georgia State Senate District 52
Party	Candidate	Votes	%
Republican	John Albers (incumbent)	51,476	51.09%
Democratic	Sarah Beeson	49,284	48.91%
Total votes		100,760	100.0%
Republican hold			

== See also ==
- List of Georgia state legislatures
