= Georgia's 13th Senate district =

American legislative district

Georgia's 13th State Senate district

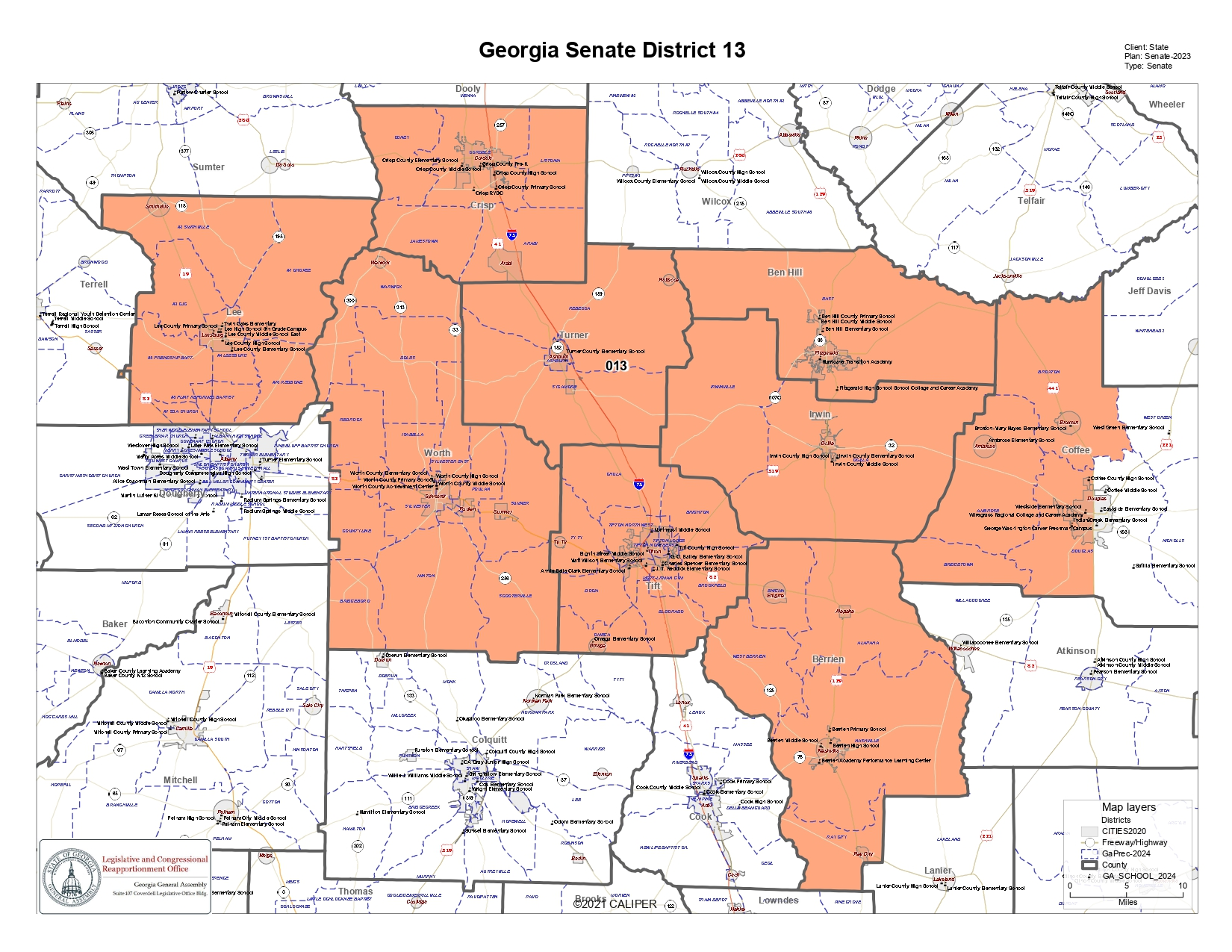
Senator
| Carden Summers; R–Cordele |
- Demographics: 61.25% White; 27.08% Black; 7.20% Hispanic; 1.20% Asian; 0.17% Native American; 0.02% Hawaiian/Pacific Islander; 0.26% Other; 3.69% Multiracial
- Population (2020) • Voting age: 189,326; 144,141

District 13 of the Georgia Senate is a district located in South Georgia.

The district includes all of Ben Hill, Berrien, Crisp, Irwin, Lee, Tift, Turner, and Worth counties, as well as the western part of Coffee County. Cities in the district include Cordele, Douglas, Leesburg, and Tifton.

The current senator is Carden Summers, a Republican from Cordele first elected in a special election in 2020.

== Geography ==
District 13 is made up the entirety of the counties of Berrien County, Ben Hill, Crisp, Irwin, Lee, Tift, Turner, and Worth, as well as part of the county of Coffee.

Ben Hill County - 100% of county :

Berrien County - 100% of county :

Coffee County - 43.6% of county:

- Ambrose
- Broxton
- Part of Douglas

Crisp County - 100% of county :

Irwin County - 100% of county :

Lee County - 100% of county :

Tift County - 100% of county :

Turner County - 100% of county :

Worth County - 100% of county :

== Recent election results ==
=== 2022 ===
2022 Georgia State Senate election, District 13
| Party | Candidate | Votes | % |
|---|---|---|---|
| Republican | Carden Summers | 54,014 | 100 |
| Total votes | | 17,732 | 100.0 |
| Republican hold | | | |

Elections prior to 2022 were held under different district lines.

=== 2024 ===
2024 Georgia State Senate election, District 13
| Party | Candidate | Votes | % |
|---|---|---|---|
| Republican | Carden Summers | 69,318 | 100 |
| Total votes | | 69,318 | 100.0 |
| Republican hold | | | |

== Historical election results ==
=== 2012 ===
2012 Georgia State Senate election, District 13
| Party | Candidate | Votes | % |
|---|---|---|---|
| Republican | John D. Crosby | 45,848 | 100 |
| Total votes | | 19,323 | 100 |
| Republican hold | | | |

=== 2014 ===
2014 Georgia State Senate election, District 13
| Party | Candidate | Votes | % |
|---|---|---|---|
| Republican | Greg Kirk | Unchallenged | |
| Total votes | | | |
| Republican hold | | | |

=== 2016 ===
2016 Georgia State Senate election, District 13
| Party | Candidate | Votes | % |
|---|---|---|---|
| Republican | Greg Kirk | 43,543 | 72.1 |
| Democratic | Reunett Melton | 18,853 | 27.9 |
| Total votes | | 60,387 | 100 |
| Republican hold | | | |

=== 2018 ===
2018 Georgia State Senate election, District 13
| Party | Candidate | Votes | % |
|---|---|---|---|
| Republican | Greg Kirk | 48,649 | 100 |
| Total votes | | 48,649 | 100 |
| Republican hold | | | |

=== 2020 - Special ===
2020 Georgia State Senate election, District 13
| Party | Candidate | Votes | % |
|---|---|---|---|
| Republican | Carden Summers | 6,294 | 52 |
| Republican | Jimm Quinn | 5,811 | 48 |
| Total votes | | 12,105 | 100 |
| Republican hold | | | |

=== 2020 ===
2020 Georgia State Senate election, District 13
| Party | Candidate | Votes | % |
|---|---|---|---|
| Republican | Matthew Pouliot | 48,153 | 69.5 |
| Democratic | Mary Egler | 21,178 | 30.5 |
| Total votes | | 21,206 | 100 |
| Republican hold | | | |
