= Randy Robertson =

Randy Robertson may refer to:

- Randy Robertson (character)
- Randy Robertson (politician)
