= Georgia's 16th Senate district =

American legislative district

Georgia's 16th State Senate district

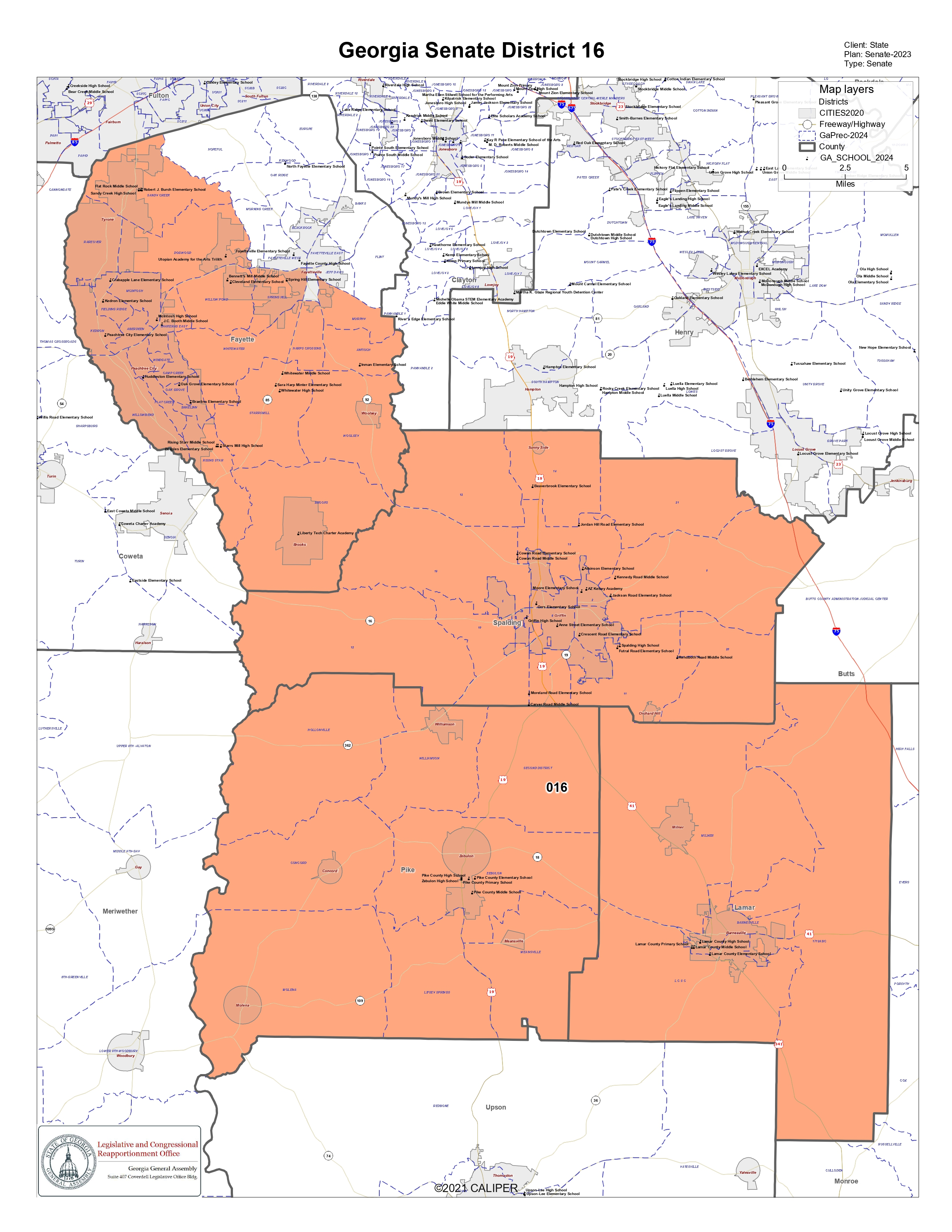
Senator
Marty Harbin; R–Tyrone
- Demographics: 64.19% White; 22.31% Black; 5.95% Hispanic; 3.04% Asian; 0.17% Native American; 0.03% Hawaiian/Pacific Islander; 0.51% Other; 4.94% Multiracial
- Population (2020) • Voting age: 191,829; 147,133

District 16 of the Georgia Senate is a district located in southern Metro Atlanta.

The district includes the southern and western parts of Fayette County as well as all of Lamar, Pike, and Spalding counties. Cities in the district include Barnesville, Brooks, Griffin, Peachtree City, Tyrone, Woolsey, and Zebulon, as well as part of Fayetteville.

The current senator is Marty Harbin, a Republican from Tyrone first elected in 2014.

== Geography ==
District 16 is made up the entirety of the counties of Pike County, Lamar, and Spalding, as well as part of the county of Fayette.

Fayette - 77.6% of county:

- Brooks
- Part of Fayetteville (county seat)
- Peachtree City (largest city)
- Tyrone
- Woolsey

Pike County - 100% of county :

Lamar County - 100% of county :

Spalding County - 100% of county :

== Recent election results ==
=== 2020 ===
2020 Georgia State Senate election, District 16
Party	Candidate	Votes	%
Republican	Marty Harbin	65,626	68.2
Democratic	Cinquez Jester	30,643	31.8
Total votes		96,269	100
Republican hold			

Elections prior to 2020 were held under different district lines.

=== 2022 ===
2022 Georgia State Senate election, District 16
Party	Candidate	Votes	%
Republican	Marty Harbin	57,965	68.2
Democratic	Pingke Dubignon	27,408	31.8
Total votes		85,013	100.0
Republican hold			

=== 2024 ===
2024 Georgia State Senate election, District 16
Party	Candidate	Votes	%
Republican	Marty Harbin	71,842	65.8
Democratic	Amili Blake	37,388	30.5
Total votes		109,230	100.0

== Historical election results ==
=== 2012 ===
2012 Georgia State Senate election, District 16
Party	Candidate	Votes	%
Republican	Ronnie Chance	62,356	100
Total votes		62,356	100
Republican hold			

=== 2014 ===
2014 Georgia State Senate election, District 16
Party	Candidate	Votes	%
Republican	Marty Harbin	Unchallenged	
Total votes			
Republican hold			

=== 2016 ===
2016 Georgia State Senate election, District 13
Party	Candidate	Votes	%
Republican	Marty Harbin	66,386	100%
Total votes		66,386	100
Republican hold			

=== 2018 ===
2018 Georgia State Senate election, District 16
Party	Candidate	Votes	%
Republican	Marty Harbin	53,201	100
Democratic	Bill Lightle	24,858	31.8
Total votes		78,059	100
Republican hold			
