= 2020 Georgia Senate election =

2020 Georgia Senate election can refer to:

- 2020 Georgia State Senate election
- 2020–21 United States Senate election in Georgia
- 2020–21 United States Senate special election in Georgia
