= Senator Wicks =

Senator Wicks may refer to:

- Arthur H. Wicks (1887–1985), New York State Senate
- Charles W. Wicks (1862–1931), New York State Senate
- Kenya Wicks (fl. 2020s), Georgia State Senate
