= Georgia's 8th Senate district =

American legislative district

Georgia's 8th State Senate district
Senator
| Russ Goodman; R–Cogdell |
- Demographics: 57.39% White; 30.03% Black; 7.28% Hispanic; 1.21% Asian; 0.28% Native American; 0.07% Hawaiian/Pacific Islander; 0.35% Other; 4.50% Multiracial
- Population (2020) • Voting age: 192,396; 145,144

District 8 of the Georgia Senate is a senatorial district in South Georgia anchored in Valdosta.

The district includes all of Atkinson, Clinch, Echols, Lanier, Lowndes, and Pierce counties, as well as western Ware County including part of Waycross. The district includes the city of Valdosta and most of the Valdosta metropolitan area.

The current senator is Russ Goodman, a Republican from Cogdell first elected in 2020.

== District officeholders ==
- Frederick Barrow Hand: 1931–1932
- Loyce W. Turner: 1975–1998
- Tim Golden: 1998 – January 12, 2015
- C. Ellis Black: January 12, 2015 – January 11, 2021
- Russ Goodman: January 11, 2021 – present
