= Kenya Wicks =

American politician

Member of the Georgia State Senate from the 34th district
- Incumbent
- Assumed office January 13, 2025
- Preceded by: Valencia Seay

Personal details
- Party: Democratic
- Children: 3
- Education: University of Alabama

Military service
- Branch/service: United States Army
- Rank: Major

Kenya U. Wicks is an American politician serving as senator for Georgia's 34th Senate district.

== Life ==
Wicks was raised in Louisville, Kentucky. She enlisted into the United States Army, rising to the rank of sergeant first class. In 2008, she commissioned through Officer Candidate School and earned a B.S. in environmental science from University of Alabama in 2010. She retired after thirty years as a major.

During the 2024 Georgia State Senate election, Wicks defeated Valencia Stovall during a runoff in the Democratic primary election. She won against Republican Andrew E. Honeycutt in the general election.

Wicks has three children. She is a volunteer Court Appointed Special Advocate.
