= Georgia's 39th Senate district =

Georgia's 39th State Senate district
Senator
Sonya Halpern; D–Atlanta
- Demographics: 29.27% White; 55.12% Black; 6.6% Hispanic; 4.85% Asian; 0.16% Native American; 0.04% Hawaiian/Pacific Islander; 0.59% Other; 4.10% Multiracial
- Population (2020) • Voting age: 192,047; 157,956

District 39 of the Georgia Senate is located in Metro Atlanta.

The district is contained entirely within Fulton County, including parts of Atlanta, College Park, East Point, and South Fulton. In Atlanta, the district includes the Bankhead, Buckhead, Cascade Heights, Garden Hills, Home Park, north Midtown, Morningside, Lindbergh, and West End neighborhoods, as well as the Georgia Tech campus.

The current senator is Sonya Halpern, a Democrat from Atlanta first elected in 2020.

Former occupants of the seat include Julian Bond, former NAACP chairman, and Nikema Williams, current U.S. representative for Georgia's 5th congressional district.

== List of senators ==
Member	Party	Years	Residence	Electoral history	Counties
W.W. Jones		1913	Cumming		
C. J. Harbin		1919	Cumming		
P. B. Latimer		192?	Woodstock		
Glen Florence	Democratic	194?–1951			
Harold S. Willingham	Democratic	1951–1953			
Grady N. Coker.	Democratic	1953–1955			
Glen Florence	Democratic	1955–1957			
Fred D. Bentley, Sr.	Democratic	1957–1959			
Thomas A. Roach	Democratic	1959–1960			
J. L. White	Democratic	1961–1963	Douglasville		
Oby T. Brewer, Sr	Democratic	1963–1965	Atlanta		
Horace Ward	Democratic	1965–1974			
Julian Bond	Democratic	January 13, 1975 – January 12, 1987			
Hildred W. Shumake	Democratic	1987–1993			
Ron Slotin	Democratic	1993–1996			
Vincent Fort	Democratic	1996–2017			
Nikema Williams	Democratic	December 5, 2017 – January 3, 2021			
Sonya Halpern	Democratic	January 3, 2021 – present			
