= 2012 United States state legislative elections =

- November 6, 2012

86 legislative chambers 44 states
	Majority party	Minority party	Third party
Party	Republican	Democratic	Coalition
Chambers before	61	36 (Note: Democratic control of the Wisconsin Senate was the result of recall efforts in 2011 and earlier in 2012.)	1 (Note: The Alaska Senate was controlled by a coalition of Democrats and Republicans. The minority caucus consists of Republicans who were not part of the majority coalition.)
Chambers after	58	39	2 (Note: The New York Senate was controlled by a coalition of Republicans and members of the Independent Democratic Conference) (Note: In the Washington State Senate, two Democrats caucused with Republicans to form the Majority Coalition Caucus. Three additional Democrats also caucus with the majority.)
Overall change	▼3	▲3 (Note: The Oregon House of Representatives was tied in the 2011-2013 session, but Democrats gained control in the 2012 elections. This chamber was not counted in the previous total.)	▲1
- Map of upper house elections: Democrats gained control Democrats retained control Republicans gained control Republicans retained control Coalition gained control Non-partisan legislature No regularly-scheduled elections

- Map of lower house elections: Democrats gained control Democrats retained control Republicans gained control Republicans retained control Non-partisan legislature No regularly-scheduled elections

The 2012 United States state legislative elections were held on November 6, 2012, for 86 state legislative chambers in 44 states. Across the fifty states, approximately 65 percent of all upper house seats and 85 percent of all lower house seats were up for election. Nine legislative chambers in the five permanently inhabited U.S. territories and the federal district of Washington, D.C. also held elections. The elections took place concurrently with several other federal, state, and local elections, including the presidential election, U.S. Senate elections, U.S. House elections, and gubernatorial elections.

13 chambers shifted party control, as Republicans had gained many chambers in the 2010 mid-term elections, and this was seen as a modest rebalancing.

Democrats won the Colorado House of Representatives, Maine Senate, Maine House of Representatives, Minnesota Senate, Minnesota House of Representatives, New Hampshire House of Representatives, and Oregon House of Representatives that was previously tied. Meanwhile, Republicans won the Wisconsin Senate, which was briefly under Democratic control after multiple recall elections earlier in the year, and both chambers of the Arkansas legislature for the first time since 1874. The Alaska Senate went from a Democratic-led coalition to Republican control. The Washington Senate went from Democratic control to a Republican-led coalition, and the New York State Senate went from Republican control to a Republican-led coalition.

Democrats won a trifecta in Minnesota for the first time since 1991.

== Summary table ==
Regularly scheduled elections were held in 86 of the 99 state legislative chambers in the United States. Nationwide, regularly scheduled elections were held for 6,015 of the 7,383 legislative seats. Many legislative chambers held elections for all seats, but some legislative chambers that use staggered elections held elections for only a portion of the total seats in the chamber. The chambers not up for election either hold regularly scheduled elections in odd-numbered years, or have four-year terms and hold all regularly scheduled elections in presidential midterm election years.

Note that this table only covers regularly scheduled elections; additional special elections took place concurrently with these regularly scheduled elections.

State	Upper House				Lower House			
State	Seats up	Total	% up	Term	Seats up	Total	% up	Term
Alaska	19	20	95	4	40	40	100	2
Arizona	30	30	100	2	60	60	100	2
Arkansas	35	35	100	2/4 (Note: The upper houses of Arkansas, Delaware, Florida, Hawaii, Illinois, Minnesota, New Jersey, and Texas use a 2-4-4 term length system.)	100	100	100	2
California	20	40	50	4	80	80	100	2
Colorado	18	35	51	4	65	65	100	2
Connecticut	36	36	100	2	151	151	100	2
Delaware	21	21	100	2/4	41	41	100	2
Florida	40	40	100	2/4	120	120	100	2
Georgia	56	56	100	2	180	180	100	2
Hawaii	25	25	100	2/4	51	51	100	2
Idaho	35	35	100	2	70	70	100	2
Illinois	59	59	100	2/4	118	118	100	2
Indiana	25	50	50	4	100	100	100	2
Iowa	25	50	50	4	100	100	100	2
Kansas	40	40	100	4	125	125	100	2
Kentucky	19	38	50	4	100	100	100	2
Louisiana	0	39	0	4	0	105	0	4
Maine	35	35	100	2	151	151	100	2
Maryland	0	47	0	4	0	141	0	4
Massachusetts	40	40	100	2	160	160	100	2
Michigan	0	38	0	4	110	110	100	2
Minnesota	67	67	100	2/4	134	134	100	2
Mississippi	0	52	0	4	0	122	0	4
Missouri	17	34	50	4	163	163	100	2
Montana	25	50	50	4	100	100	100	2
Nebraska	25 (Note: These figures represent the seats of Nebraska's unicameral legislature.)	49	51	4	N/A (unicameral)			
Nevada	10	21	48	4	42	42	100	2
New Hampshire	24	24	100	2	400	400	100	2
New Jersey	0	40	0	2/4	0	80	0	2
New Mexico	42	42	100	4	70	70	100	2
New York	63	63	100	2	150	150	100	2
North Carolina	50	50	100	2	120	120	100	2
North Dakota	23	47	49	4	47	94	50	4
Ohio	16	33	48	4	99	99	100	2
Oklahoma	24	48	50	4	101	101	100	2
Oregon	15	30	50	4	60	60	100	2
Pennsylvania	25	50	50	4	203	203	100	2
Rhode Island	38	38	100	2	75	75	100	2
South Carolina	46	46	100	4	124	124	100	2
South Dakota	35	35	100	2	70	70	100	2
Tennessee	16	33	48	4	99	99	100	2
Texas	16	31	52	2/4	150	150	100	2
Utah	15	29	52	4	75	75	100	2
Vermont	30	30	100	2	150	150	100	2
Virginia	0	40	0	4	0	100	0	2
Washington	25	49	51	4	98	98	100	2
West Virginia	17	34	50	4	100	100	100	2
Wisconsin	16	33	48	4	99	99	100	2
Wyoming	15	30	50	4	60	60	100	2
Total	1281	1972	65	N/A	4595	5411	85	N/A

== Redistricting ==
Partisan control of U.S. state legislative redistricting following the 2010 census. Republican control (20) Split or bipartisan control (16) Democratic control (8) Independent redistricting commission (6)

The 2012 elections were the first held after redistricting following the 2010 census. All states holding elections in 2012 did so under new maps drawn in accordance with the new census results with the exception of Montana and Pennsylvania. Montana implements its new maps four years after the census as opposed to two, whereas Pennsylvania's Supreme Court rejected the legislative maps drawn by the state's politician redistricting commission, leaving the elections to be held under the lines passed in 2001. In a majority of states, legislative redistricting is controlled by the state legislature, often subject to gubernatorial veto. This allows for widespread gerrymandering, in which the party in power draws legislative boundaries to favor itself. Many states delegate redistricting power to an independent or bipartisan redistricting commission, often with the goal of minimizing or eliminating partisan gerrymandering.

== Electoral predictions ==
Analysts considered both the Democratic and Republican parties to be at approximately equal risk of losing state legislative chambers to the other, owing to the expectation that this would be the first election that was not a wave election since 2004. Although Republicans were expected to win states like Arkansas, which had been trending towards them in recent years, Democrats had the potential to roll back some of the gains Republicans had made in 2010 in more competitive states such as Colorado. Despite the potential for Democratic gains, they were still expected to remain far behind the Republicans in overall chamber control due to the major losses the party suffered in 2010 and 2011.

Ratings are designated as follows:

- "Tossup": Competitive, no advantage
- "Lean": Competitive, slight advantage
- "Likely": Not competitive, but opposition could make significant gains
- "Safe": Not competitive at all

State	Chamber	Last election	Ballotpedia Nov. 1, 2012	Governing Oct. 24, 2012	Result
Alaska	Senate	Coal. 15–5	Lean R (flip)	Lean R (flip)	R 13–7
Alaska	House of Representatives	R 24–16	Lean R	Safe R	R 26–14
Arizona	Senate	R 21–9	Likely R	Likely R	R 17–13
Arizona	House of Representatives	R 40–20	Likely R	Likely R	R 36–24
Arkansas	Senate	D 20–15	Lean R (flip)	Lean R (flip)	R 21–14
Arkansas	House of Representatives	D 55–45	Lean R (flip)	Lean R (flip)	R 51–48–1
California	State Senate	D 25–15	Safe D	Safe D	D 29–11
California	State Assembly	D 52–28	Safe D	Safe D	D 56–24
Colorado	Senate	D 20–15	Tossup	Lean D	D 20–15
Colorado	House of Representatives	R 33–32	Tossup	Lean D (flip)	D 37–28
Connecticut	State Senate	D 23–13	Lean D	Safe D	D 22–14
Connecticut	House of Representatives	D 99–52	Safe D	Safe D	D 98–53
Delaware	Senate	D 14–7	Likely D	Safe D	D 13–8
Delaware	House of Representatives	D 26–15	Safe D	Safe D	D 27–14
Florida	Senate	R 28–12	Likely R	Likely R	R 26–14
Florida	House of Representatives	R 81–39	Safe R	Likely R	R 76–44
Georgia	State Senate	R 35–21	Safe R	Safe R	R 38–18
Georgia	House of Representatives	R 108–71–1	Safe R	Safe R	R 119–60–1
Hawaii	Senate	D 24–1	Safe D	Safe D	D 24–1
Hawaii	House of Representatives	D 43–8	Safe D	Safe D	D 44–7
Idaho	Senate	R 28–7	Safe R	Safe R	R 29–6
Idaho	House of Representatives	R 57–13	Safe R	Safe R	R 57–13
Illinois	Senate	D 35–24	Safe D	Safe D	D 40–19
Illinois	House of Representatives	D 64–54	Safe D	Safe D	D 71–47
Indiana	Senate	R 37–13	Safe R	Safe R	R 37–13
Indiana	House of Representatives	R 60–40	Safe R	Safe R	R 69–31
Iowa	Senate	D 26–24	Tossup	Tossup	D 26–24
Iowa	House of Representatives	R 60–40	Lean R	Likely R	R 53–47
Kansas	Senate	R 31–9	Safe R	Safe R	R 32–8
Kansas	House of Representatives	R 92–33	Safe R	Safe R	R 92–33
Kentucky	Senate	R 22–15–1	Safe R	Safe R	R 23–14–1
Kentucky	House of Representatives	D 58–42	Lean D	Lean D	D 55–45
Maine	Senate	R 20–14–1	Lean D (flip)	Lean R	D 19–15–1
Maine	House of Representatives	R 77–73–1	Tossup	Lean D (flip)	D 89–58–4
Massachusetts	Senate	D 36–4	Safe D	Safe D	D 36–4
Massachusetts	House of Representatives	D 130–30	Safe D	Safe D	D 131–29
Michigan	House of Representatives	R 63–47	Lean R	Lean R	R 59–51
Minnesota	Senate	R 37–30	Tossup	Tossup	D 39–28
Minnesota	House of Representatives	R 72–62	Tossup	Tossup	D 73–61
Missouri	Senate	R 26–8	Likely R	Safe R	R 24–10
Missouri	House of Representatives	R 106–57	Likely R	Safe R	R 110–53
Montana	Senate	R 28–22	Likely R	Safe R	R 27–23
Montana	House of Representatives	R 68–32	Safe R	Safe R	R 61–39
Nevada	Senate	D 11–10	Tossup	Tossup	D 11–10
Nevada	Assembly	D 26–16	Lean D	Lean D	D 27–15
New Hampshire	Senate	R 19–5	Lean R	Lean R	R 13–11
New Hampshire	House of Representatives	R 298–102	Lean R	Lean R	D 221–179
New Mexico	Senate	D 27–15	Tossup	Likely D	D 25–17
New Mexico	House of Representatives	D 36–34	Lean R (flip)	Lean D	D 38–32
New York	State Senate	R 32–30	Lean R	Tossup	Coal. 36–27
New York	State Assembly	D 99–50–1	Safe D	Safe D	D 105–44–1
North Carolina	Senate	R 31–19	Safe R	Likely R	R 32–18
North Carolina	House of Representatives	R 67–52–1	Safe R	Likely R	R 77–43
North Dakota	Senate	R 35–12	Safe R	Safe R	R 33–14
North Dakota	House of Representatives	R 69–25	Safe R	Safe R	R 71–23
Ohio	Senate	R 23–10	Safe R	Safe R	R 23–10
Ohio	House of Representatives	R 59–40	Likely R	Lean R	R 60–39
Oklahoma	Senate	R 32–16	Safe R	Safe R	R 36–12
Oklahoma	House of Representatives	R 70–31	Safe R	Safe R	R 72–29
Oregon	State Senate	D 16–14	Lean D	Lean D	D 16–14
Oregon	House of Representatives	30–30	Tossup	Lean D (flip)	D 34–26
Pennsylvania	State Senate	R 30–20	Lean R	Likely R	R 27–23
Pennsylvania	House of Representatives	R 112–91	Likely R	Likely R	R 111–92
Rhode Island	Senate	D 29–8–1	Safe D	Safe D	D 32–5–1
Rhode Island	House of Representatives	D 65–10	Safe D	Safe D	D 69–6
South Carolina	Senate	R 27–19	Likely R	Safe R	R 28–18
South Carolina	House of Representatives	R 76–48	Safe R	Safe R	R 78–46
South Dakota	Senate	R 30–5	Safe R	Safe R	R 28–7
South Dakota	House of Representatives	R 50–19–1	Safe R	Safe R	R 53–17
Tennessee	Senate	R 20–13	Safe R	Safe R	R 26–7
Tennessee	House of Representatives	R 64–34–1	Safe R	Safe R	R 71–27–1
Texas	Senate	R 19–12	Safe R	Safe R	R 19–12
Texas	House of Representatives	R 99–51	Safe R	Safe R	R 95–55
Utah	State Senate	R 22–7	Safe R	Safe R	R 24–5
Utah	House of Representatives	R 58–17	Safe R	Safe R	R 61–14
Vermont	Senate	D 21–8–1	Safe D	Safe D	D 21–7–2
Vermont	House of Representatives	D 94–48–5–3	Safe D	Safe D	D 96–45–5–4
Washington	State Senate	D 27–22	Lean D	Tossup	Coal. 26–23
Washington	House of Representatives	D 56–42	Likely D	Likely D	D 55–43
West Virginia	Senate	D 28–6	Safe D	Likely D	D 25–9
West Virginia	House of Delegates	D 65–35	Safe D	Likely D	D 54–46
Wisconsin	Senate	D 17–16 (Note: Includes the 2011 and 2012 recall elections that flipped 3 seats to Democrats, winning them control of the chamber from the Republicans)	Lean R (flip)	Lean R (flip)	R 18–15
Wisconsin	State Assembly	R 60–38–1	Likely R	Likely R	R 60–39
Wyoming	Senate	R 26–4	Safe R	Safe R	R 26–4
Wyoming	House of Representatives	R 50–10	Safe R	Safe R	R 52–8

== Maps ==
Upper house seats by party holding majority in each state
Republican 50–60% 60–70% 70–80% 80–90%	Democratic 50–60% 60–70% 70–80% 80–90% 90–100%	Tie 50%

Lower house seats by party holding majority in each state
Republican 50–60% 60–70% 70–80% 80–90%	Democratic 50–60% 60–70% 70–80% 80–90% 90–100%

Net changes to upper house seats after the 2012 elections
+2 Dem seats +3–5 Dem seats +6–11 Dem seats
+1 Rep seat +2 Rep seats +3–4 Rep seats +6 Rep seats
+1 Prog seat

Net changes to lower house seats after the 2012 elections
+1 Dem seat +2 Dem seats +3–5 Dem seats
+6–11 Dem seats +17 Dem seats +116 Dem seats
+1 Rep seat +2 Rep seats +3–5 Rep seats +6–11 Rep seats

== State summaries ==
=== Alaska ===
Most of the seats of the Alaska Senate and all of the seats of the Alaska House of Representatives were up for election in 2012. Republicans won control of the Senate from a Democratic-led coalition, while maintaining control of the Alaska House of Representatives.

Alaska Senate
Party	Before	After	Change
Republican	5	13	▲3
Republican	5	13	▲3
Democratic	10	2	▼3
Democratic	10	5	▼3
Total	20	20	

Alaska House of Representatives
Party	Before	After	Change
Republican	24	26	▲2
Democratic	4	4	▼2
Democratic	12	10	▼2
Total	40	40	

=== Arizona ===
All of the seats of the Arizona Senate and the Arizona House of Representatives were up for election in 2012. Republicans maintained a government trifecta with control of the governorship and both state legislative chambers.

Arizona Senate
Party	Before	After	Change
Republican	21	17	▼4
Democratic	9	13	▲4
Total	30	30	

Arizona House of Representatives
Party	Before	After	Change
Republican	40	36	▼4
Democratic	20	24	▲4
Total	60	60	

=== Arkansas ===
All of the seats of the Arkansas Senate and all of the seats of the Arkansas House of Representatives were up for election in 2012. Republicans won control of both chambers for the first time since Reconstruction, thereby ending a government trifecta. The Green Party won one seat in the House because a judge had ordered all votes for the candidate's opponent not be counted, due to a felony conviction for election fraud.

Arkansas Senate
Party	Before	After	Change
Republican	15	21	▲6
Democratic	20	14	▼6
Total	35	35	

Arkansas House of Representatives
Party	Before	After	Change
Republican	46	51	▲5
Democratic	54	48	▼6
Green	0	1	▲1
Total	100	100	

=== California ===
Half of the seats of the California State Senate and all of the seats of the California State Assembly were up for election in 2012. Democrats held control of both chambers, maintaining a government trifecta.

California State Senate
Party	Before	After	Change
Democratic	25	29	▲4
Republican	15	11	▼4
Total	40	40	

California State Assembly
Party	Before	After	Change
Democratic	52	55	▲3
Republican	28	25	▼3
Total	80	80	

=== Colorado ===
Half of the seats of the Colorado Senate and all of the seats of the Colorado House of Representatives were up for election in 2012. Democrats held control of the state Senate and won control of the state House, establishing a trifecta.

Colorado Senate
Party	Before	After	Change
Democratic	20	20	Steady
Republican	15	15	Steady
Total	35	35	

Colorado House of Representatives
Party	Before	After	Change
Democratic	32	37	▲5
Republican	33	28	▼5
Total	65	65	

=== Connecticut ===
All of the seats of the Connecticut State Senate and the Connecticut House of Representatives were up for election in 2012. Democrats held control of both houses.

Connecticut State Senate
Party	Before	After	Change
Democratic	22	22	Steady
Republican	14	14	Steady
Total	36	36	

Connecticut House of Representatives
Party	Before	After	Change
Democratic	99	98	▼1
Republican	52	53	▲1
Total	151	151	

=== Delaware ===
All of the seats of the Delaware Senate and all of the seats of the Delaware House of Representatives were up for election in 2012. Democrats held control of both chambers, maintaining a government trifecta.

Delaware Senate
Party	Before	After	Change
Democratic	14	13	▼1
Republican	7	8	▲1
Total	21	21	

Delaware House of Representatives
Party	Before	After	Change
Democratic	26	27	▲1
Republican	15	14	▼1
Total	41	41	

=== Florida ===
All of the seats of the Florida Senate and all of the seats of the Florida House of Representatives were up for election in 2012. Republicans held control of both chambers, maintaining a government trifecta.

Florida Senate
Party	Before	After	Change
Republican	28	26	▼2
Democratic	12	14	▲2
Total	40	40	

Florida House of Representatives
Party	Before	After	Change
Republican	81	76	▼5
Democratic	39	44	▲5
Total	120	120	

=== Georgia ===
All of the seats of the Georgia State Senate and the Georgia House of Representatives were up for election in 2012. Republicans held control of both chambers, maintaining a government trifecta.

Georgia State Senate
Party	Before	After	Change
Republican	36	38	▲2
Democratic	20	18	▼2
Total	56	56	

Georgia House of Representatives
Party	Before	After	Change
Republican	116	119	▲3
Democratic	63	60	▼3
Independent	1	1	Steady
Total	180	180	

=== Hawaii ===
All of the seats of the Hawaii Senate and all of the seats of the Hawaii House of Representatives were up for election in 2012. Democrats held control of both chambers, maintaining a government trifecta.

Hawaii Senate
Party	Before	After	Change
Democratic	24	24	Steady
Republican	1	1	Steady
Total	25	25	

Hawaii House of Representatives
Party	Before	After	Change
Democratic	43	44	▲1
Republican	8	7	▼1
Total	51	51	

=== Idaho ===
All of the seats of the Idaho Senate and the Idaho House of Representatives were up for election in 2012. Republicans held control of both chambers, maintaining a government trifecta.

Idaho Senate
Party	Before	After	Change
Republican	28	29	▲1
Democratic	7	6	▼1
Total	35	35	

Idaho House of Representatives
Party	Before	After	Change
Republican	57	57	Steady
Democratic	13	13	Steady
Total	70	70	

=== Illinois ===
All of the seats of the Illinois Senate and all of the seats of the Illinois House of Representatives were up for election in 2012. Democrats held control of both chambers to maintain a trifecta.

Illinois Senate
Party	Before	After	Change
Democratic	35	40	▲5
Republican	24	19	▼5
Total	59	59	

Illinois House of Representatives
Party	Before	After	Change
Democratic	64	71	▲7
Republican	54	47	▼7
Total	118	118	

=== Indiana ===
Half of the seats of the Indiana Senate and all of the seats of the Indiana House of Representatives were up for election in 2012. Republicans held control of both chambers, maintaining a government trifecta.

Indiana Senate
Party	Before	After	Change
Republican	37	37	Steady
Democratic	13	13	Steady
Total	50	50	

Indiana House of Representatives
Party	Before	After	Change
Republican	60	69	▲9
Democratic	40	31	▼9
Total	100	100	

=== Iowa ===
Half of the seats of the Iowa Senate and all of the seats of the Iowa House of Representatives were up for election in 2012. Republicans held control of the state House, and Democrats held control of the state Senate.

Iowa Senate
Party	Before	After	Change
Democratic	26	26	Steady
Republican	24	24	Steady
Total	50	50	

Iowa House of Representatives
Party	Before	After	Change
Republican	60	53	▼7
Democratic	40	47	▲7
Total	100	100	

=== Kansas ===
All of the seats of the Kansas Senate and the Kansas House of Representatives were up for election in 2012. Republicans held control of both chambers and maintained a trifecta.

Kansas Senate
Party	Before	After	Change
Republican	32	32	Steady
Democratic	8	8	Steady
Total	40	40	

Kansas House of Representatives
Party	Before	After	Change
Republican	92	92	Steady
Democratic	33	33	Steady
Total	125	125	

=== Kentucky ===
Half of the seats of the Kentucky Senate and all of the seats of the Kentucky House of Representatives were up for election in 2012. Republicans held control of the state Senate, and Democrats held control of the state House.

Kentucky Senate
Party	Before	After	Change
Republican	22	23	▲1
Democratic	15	14	▼1
Independent	1	1	Steady
Total	38	38	

Kentucky House of Representatives
Party	Before	After	Change
Democratic	59	55	▼4
Republican	41	45	▲4
Total	100	100	

=== Maine ===
All of the seats of the Maine Senate and the Maine House of Representatives were up for election in 2012. Democrats won control of both houses, ending a Republican trifecta.

Maine Senate
Party	Before	After	Change
Democratic	11	19	▲5
Republican	20	15	▼5
Independent	1	1	Steady
Total	35	35	

Maine House of Representatives
Party	Before	After	Change
Democratic	72	89	▲17
Republican	78	58	▼20
Independent	1	4	▲3
Total	151	151	

=== Massachusetts ===
All of the seats of the Massachusetts Senate and the Massachusetts House of Representatives were up for election in 2012. Democrats retained control of both chambers to maintain a trifecta.

Massachusetts Senate
Party	Before	After	Change
Democratic	36	36	Steady
Republican	4	4	Steady
Total	40	40	

Massachusetts House of Representatives
Party	Before	After	Change
Democratic	127	131	▲4
Republican	33	29	▼4
Total	160	160	

=== Michigan ===
All of the seats of the Michigan House of Representatives were up for election in 2012. The Michigan Senate did not hold regularly scheduled elections in 2012. Republicans maintained control of the chamber.

Michigan House of Representatives
Party	Before	After	Change
Republican	63	59	▼4
Democratic	47	51	▲4
Total	110	110	

=== Minnesota ===
All of the seats of the Minnesota Senate and the Minnesota House of Representatives were up for election in 2012. Democrats won control of both chambers, thereby establishing a trifecta.

Minnesota Senate
Party	Before	After	Change
Democratic (DFL)	30	39	▲9
Republican	37	28	▼9
Total	67	67	

Minnesota House of Representatives
Party	Before	After	Change
Democratic (DFL)	62	73	▲11
Republican	72	61	▼11
Total	134	134	

=== Missouri ===
Half of the seats of the Missouri Senate and all of the seats of the Missouri House of Representatives were up for election in 2012. Republicans held control of both chambers.

Missouri Senate
Party	Before	After	Change
Republican	26	24	▼2
Democratic	8	10	▲2
Total	34	34	

Missouri House of Representatives
Party	Before	After	Change
Republican	106	110	▲4
Democratic	56	53	▼3
Independent	1	0	▼1
Total	163	163	

=== Montana ===
Half of the seats of the Montana Senate and all of the seats of the Montana House of Representatives were up for election in 2012. Republicans held control of both chambers.

Montana Senate
Party	Before	After	Change
Republican	27	27	Steady
Democratic	23	23	Steady
Total	50	50	

Montana House of Representatives
Party	Before	After	Change
Republican	68	61	▼7
Democratic	32	39	▲7
Total	100	100	

=== Nebraska ===
Nebraska is the only U.S. state with a unicameral legislature; half of the seats of the Nebraska Legislature were up for election in 2012. Nebraska is also unique in that its legislature is officially non-partisan and holds non-partisan elections, although the Democratic and Republican parties each endorse legislative candidates.

=== Nevada ===
Half of the seats of the Nevada Senate and all of the seats of the Nevada Assembly were up for election in 2012. Democrats maintained control of both chambers.

Nevada Senate
Party	Before	After	Change
Democratic	11	11	Steady
Republican	10	10	Steady
Total	21	21	

Nevada Assembly
Party	Before	After	Change
Democratic	26	27	▲1
Republican	16	15	▼1
Total	42	42	

=== New Hampshire ===
All of the seats of the New Hampshire Senate and the New Hampshire House of Representatives were up for election in 2012. Republicans maintained control of the state Senate, and Democrats won control of the state House.

New Hampshire Senate
Party	Before	After	Change
Republican	19	13	▼6
Democratic	5	11	▲6
Total	24	24	

New Hampshire House of Representatives
Party	Before	After	Change
Democratic	105	221	▲116
Republican	295	179	▼116
Total	400	400	

=== New Mexico ===
All of the seats of the New Mexico Senate and the New Mexico House of Representatives were up for election in 2012. Democrats held control of both chambers.

New Mexico Senate
Party	Before	After	Change
Democratic	28	25	▼3
Republican	14	17	▲3
Total	42	42	

New Mexico House of Representatives
Party	Before	After	Change
Democratic	36	38	▲2
Republican	33	32	▼1
Independent	1	0	▼1
Total	70	70	

=== New York ===
All of the seats of the New York State Senate and the New York State Assembly were up for election in 2012. Democrats held control of the state House, and Republicans lost control of the state Senate and thus entered into a coalition government with the Independent Democratic Conference.

New York State Senate
Party	Before	After	Change
Republican	33	30	▼3
Democratic	4 (Note: 4 members of the Independent Democratic Caucus.)	6 (Note: 5 members of the Independent Democratic Caucus as well as Democrat Simcha Felder.)	▲2
Democratic	25	27	▲2
Total	62	63	

New York State Assembly
Party	Before	After	Change
Democratic	100	105	▲5
Republican	49	44	▼5
Independence	1	1	Steady
Total	150	150	

=== North Carolina ===
All of the seats of the North Carolina Senate and the North Carolina House of Representatives were up for election in 2012. Republicans retained control of both chambers.

North Carolina Senate
Party	Before	After	Change
Republican	31	32	▲1
Democratic	19	18	▼1
Total	50	50	

North Carolina House of Representatives
Party	Before	After	Change
Republican	68	77	▲9
Democratic	52	43	▼9
Total	120	120	

=== North Dakota ===
Half of the seats of the North Dakota Senate and the North Dakota House of Representatives were up for election in 2012. Republicans retained control of both chambers, maintaining a government trifecta.

North Dakota Senate
Party	Before	After	Change
Republican	35	33	▼2
Democratic-NPL	12	14	▲2
Total	47	47	

North Dakota House of Representatives
Party	Before	After	Change
Republican	69	71	▲2
Democratic-NPL	25	23	▼2
Total	94	94	

=== Ohio ===
Half of the seats of the Ohio Senate and all of the seats of the Ohio House of Representatives were up for election in 2012. Republicans retained control of both chambers, maintaining a government trifecta.

Ohio Senate
Party	Before	After	Change
Republican	23	23	Steady
Democratic	10	10	Steady
Total	33	33	

Ohio House of Representatives
Party	Before	After	Change
Republican	59	60	▲1
Democratic	40	39	▼1
Total	99	99	

=== Oklahoma ===
Half of the seats of the Oklahoma Senate and all of the seats of the Oklahoma House of Representatives were up for election in 2012. Republicans retained control of both chambers, maintaining a government trifecta.

Oklahoma Senate
Party	Before	After	Change
Republican	32	36	▲4
Democratic	16	12	▼4
Total	48	48	

Oklahoma House of Representatives
Party	Before	After	Change
Republican	70	72	▲2
Democratic	31	29	▼2
Total	101	101	

=== Oregon ===
Half of the seats of the Oregon State Senate and all of the seats of the Oregon House of Representatives were up for election in 2012. Democrats retained control of the state Senate, and ended the tie in the state House, thus establishing a government trifecta.

Oregon State Senate
Party	Before	After	Change
Democratic	16	16	Steady
Republican	14	14	Steady
Total	30	30	

Oregon House of Representatives
Party	Before	After	Change
Democratic	30	34	▲4
Republican	30	26	▼4
Total	60	60	

=== Pennsylvania ===
Half of the seats of the Pennsylvania State Senate and all of the seats of the Pennsylvania House of Representatives were up for election in 2012. Republicans retained control of both chambers and their government trifecta.

Pennsylvania State Senate
Party	Before	After	Change
Republican	30	27	▼3
Democratic	20	23	▲3
Total	50	50	

Pennsylvania House of Representatives
Party	Before	After	Change
Republican	111	111	Steady
Democratic	92	92	Steady
Total	203	203	

=== Rhode Island ===
All of the seats of the Rhode Island Senate and the Rhode Island House of Representatives were up for election in 2012. Democrats retained control of both chambers.

Rhode Island Senate
Party	Before	After	Change
Democratic	29	32	▲3
Republican	8	5	▼3
Independent	1	1	Steady
Total	38	38	

Rhode Island House of Representatives
Party	Before	After	Change
Democratic	65	69	▲4
Republican	9	6	▼3
Libertarian	1	0	▼1
Total	75	75	

=== South Carolina ===
All of the seats of the South Carolina Senate and the South Carolina House of Representatives were up for election in 2012. Republicans retained control of both chambers, maintaining a government trifecta.

South Carolina Senate
Party	Before	After	Change
Republican	27	28	▲1
Democratic	19	18	▼1
Total	46	46	

South Carolina House of Representatives
Party	Before	After	Change
Republican	76	78	▲2
Democratic	48	46	▼2
Total	124	124	

=== South Dakota ===
All of the seats of the South Dakota Senate and the South Dakota House of Representatives were up for election in 2012. Republicans retained control of both chambers, maintaining a government trifecta.

South Dakota Senate
Party	Before	After	Change
Republican	30	28	▼2
Democratic	5	7	▲2
Total	35	35	

South Dakota House of Representatives
Party	Before	After	Change
Republican	50	53	▲3
Democratic	19	17	▼2
Independent	1	0	▼1
Total	70	70	

=== Tennessee ===
Half of the seats of the Tennessee Senate and all of the seats of the Tennessee House of Representatives were up for election in 2012. Republicans retained control of both chambers, maintaining a government trifecta.

Tennessee Senate
Party	Before	After	Change
Republican	20	26	▲6
Democratic	13	7	▼6
Total	33	33	

Tennessee House of Representatives
Party	Before	After	Change
Republican	64	71	▲7
Democratic	34	27	▼7
Independent Republican	1	1	Steady
Total	99	99	

=== Texas ===
All of the seats in the Texas Legislature were up for election in 2012. Republicans retained control of both chambers, maintaining a government trifecta, but they lost their supermajority in the House.

Texas Senate
Party	Before	After	Change
Republican	19	19	Steady
Democratic	12	12	Steady
Total	31	31	

Texas House of Representatives
Party	Before	After	Change
Republican	102	95	▼7
Democratic	48	55	▲7
Total	150	150	

=== Utah ===
Half of the seats of the Utah State Senate and all of the seats of the Utah House of Representatives were up for election in 2012. Republicans retained control of both chambers, maintaining a government trifecta.

Utah State Senate
Party	Before	After	Change
Republican	22	24	▲2
Democratic	7	5	▼2
Total	29	29	

Utah House of Representatives
Party	Before	After	Change
Republican	58	61	▲3
Democratic	17	14	▼3
Total	75	75	

=== Vermont ===
All of the seats of the Vermont Senate and the Vermont House of Representatives were up for election in 2012. Democrats retained control of both chambers.

Vermont Senate
Party	Before	After	Change
Democratic	21	21	Steady
Republican	8	7	▼1
Progressive	1	2	▲1
Total	30	30	

Vermont House of Representatives
Party	Before	After	Change
Democratic	94	96	▲2
Republican	48	45	▼3
Progressive	5	5	Steady
Independent	3	4	▲1
Total	150	150	

=== Washington ===
Half of the seats of the Washington State Senate and all of the seats of the Washington House of Representatives were up for election in 2012. Democrats retained control of the state House, while Republicans won control of the state Senate with the help of two Democrats who formed a coalition with them.

Washington State Senate
Party	Before	After	Change
Republican	22	23 (Note: Two Democrats caucused with the Republicans to give them a majority.)	▲1
Democratic	27	2	▼1
Democratic	27	24	▼1
Total	49	49	

Washington House of Representatives
Party	Before	After	Change
Democratic	56	55	▼1
Republican	42	43	▲1
Total	98	98	

=== West Virginia ===
Half of the seats of the West Virginia Senate and all of the seats of the West Virginia House of Delegates were up for election in 2012. Democrats retained control of both chambers.

West Virginia Senate
Party	Before	After	Change
Democratic	28	25	▼3
Republican	6	9	▲3
Total	34	34	

West Virginia House of Delegates
Party	Before	After	Change
Democratic	65	54	▼11
Republican	35	46	▲11
Total	100	100	

=== Wisconsin ===
Half of the seats of the Wisconsin Senate and all of the seats of the Wisconsin State Assembly were up for election in 2012. Republicans retained control of the state Assembly, and won control of the state Senate after having lost control through a series of recall elections earlier in the year, thereby recreating a Republican trifecta.

Wisconsin Senate
Party	Before	After	Change
Republican	16	18	▲2
Democratic	17	15	▼2
Total	33	33	

Wisconsin State Assembly
Party	Before	After	Change
Republican	59	60	▲1
Democratic	39	39	Steady
Independent	1	0	▼1
Total	99	99	

=== Wyoming ===
Half of the seats of the Wyoming Senate and all of the seats of the Wyoming House of Representatives were up for election in 2012. Republicans retained control of both chambers, maintaining a government trifecta.

Wyoming Senate
Party	Before	After	Change
Republican	26	26	Steady
Democratic	4	4	Steady
Total	30	30	

Wyoming House of Representatives
Party	Before	After	Change
Republican	50	52	▲2
Democratic	10	8	▼2
Total	60	60	

== Territorial and federal district summaries ==
=== American Samoa ===
All of the seats of the American Samoa Senate and the American Samoa House of Representatives were up for election. Members of the Senate serve four-year terms, while members of the House of Representatives serve two-year terms. Gubernatorial and legislative elections are conducted on a nonpartisan basis in American Samoa.

=== Guam ===
All of the seats of the unicameral Legislature of Guam were up for election. All members of the legislature serve a two-year term. Democrats retained control of the legislature.

Guam Legislature
Party	Before	After	Change
Democratic	9	9	Steady
Republican	6	6	Steady
Total	15	15	

=== Northern Mariana Islands ===
A portion of the seats of the Northern Mariana Islands Senate, and all of the seats of the Northern Mariana Islands House of Representatives, were up for election. Members of the senate serve either four-year terms, while members of the house serve two-year terms. Republicans maintained control of the upper house, and Independents won control of the lower house.

Northern Mariana Islands Senate
Party	Before	After	Change
Republican	5	5	Steady
Independent	4	4	Steady
Democratic	0	0	Steady
Total	9	9	

Northern Mariana Islands House of Representatives
Party	Before	After	Change
Republican	9	4	▼5
Democratic	0	0	Steady
Independent	4	12	▲8
Covenant	7	4	▼3
Total	20	20	

=== Puerto Rico ===
All of the seats of the Senate of Puerto Rico and the House of Representatives of Puerto Rico are up for election. Members of the Senate and the House of Representatives both serve four-year terms. The New Progressive Party lost control of both chambers, to the Popular Democratic Party.

Puerto Rico Senate
Party	Before	After	Change
Popular Democratic	9	18	▲9
New Progressive	22	8	▼14
Puerto Rican Independence	0	1	▲1
Total	31	27	

Puerto Rico House of Representatives
Party	Before	After	Change
Popular Democratic	17	28	▲11
New Progressive	37	23	▼14
Total	54	51	

=== U.S. Virgin Islands ===
All of the seats of the unicameral Legislature of the Virgin Islands were up for election. All members of the legislature serve a two-year term. Democrats retained control of the legislature.

Virgin Islands Legislature
Party	Before	After	Change
Democratic	10	10	Steady
Independent	5	5	Steady
Total	15	15	

=== Washington, D.C. ===
The Council of the District of Columbia serves as the legislative branch of the federal district of Washington, D.C. Half of the council seats are up for election. Council members serve four-year terms. Democrats retained supermajority control of the council.

District of Columbia Council
Party	Before	After	Change
Democratic	11	11	Steady
Independent	2	2	Steady
Total	13	13	

== Recall elections ==
=== Wisconsin ===
Voters put four state senators up for recall, all Republicans, because of the budget repair bill proposed by Governor Scott Walker and the circumstances surrounding it. Democrats targeted Republicans for voting to significantly limit public employee collective bargaining. The recall elections occurred on June 5, with May 8 being the date of the primary election. These recall elections followed the largest group of recall elections in U.S. history during the previous year, in which Republicans kept control of the Wisconsin Senate. In the June 5, 2012, recall elections, Democrats flipped one seat from Republicans and won a majority in the chamber.

Dist.	Incumbent			This race	
Dist.	Member	Party	First elected	Status	Candidates
13	Scott L. Fitzgerald	Republican	1994	Incumbent retained	▌ ✓ Scott Fitzgerald (Rep.) 58.31%; ▌Lori Compas (Dem.) 40.70%; ▌Terry Virgil (Lib.) 0.94%
21	Van H. Wanggaard	Republican	2010	Incumbent recalled. New member elected. Democratic gain.	▌ ✓ John Lehman (Dem.) 50.53%; ▌Van Wanggaard (Rep.) 49.39%
23	Terry Moulton	Republican	2010	Incumbent retained	▌ ✓ Terry Moulton (Rep.) 56.57%; ▌Kristen Dexter (Dem.) 43.29%
29	--Vacant (Note: Pam Galloway (R) resigned March 16, 2012)--			Previous incumbent resigned Mar. 16, 2012. New member elected. Republican hold.	▌ ✓ Jerry Petrowski (Rep.) 61.34%; ▌Donna J. Seidel (Dem.) 38.58%

== Special elections ==
=== New Hampshire ===
District		Incumbent			This race	
Chamber	No.	Representative	Party	First elected	Results	Candidates
House	Hillsborough 10	Michael Brunelle	Democratic	2010	Incumbent resigned to join the Pennsylvania Service Employees International Union. New member elected February 21, 2012. Democratic Hold.	▌ ✓ Peter Sullivan (Democratic) 81.9%; ▌ Muni Savyon (Republican) 18.1%

== See also ==
- 2012 United States presidential election
- 2012 United States Senate elections
- 2012 United States House of Representatives elections
- 2012 United States gubernatorial elections
