= Georgia's 26th Senate district =

American legislative district

Georgia's 26th State Senate district
Senator
David Lucas; D–Macon
- Demographics: 33.26% White; 57.37% Black; 4.85% Hispanic; 0.83% Asian; 0.21% Native American; 0.04% Hawaiian/Pacific Islander; 0.31% Other; 4.09% Multiracial
- Population (2020) • Voting age: 189,945; 145,744

District 26 of the Georgia Senate is located in Middle Georgia, based in the Macon metropolitan area.

The district includes much of central Macon and Bibb County, northern Houston County and part of Warner Robins, and all of Hancock, Johnson, Twiggs, Washington, and Wilkinson counties to the east of Macon. It includes Robins Air Force Base.

The current senator is David Lucas, a Democrat from Macon first elected in 2012.
