= Cogdell, Georgia =

- Unincorporated community Census-designated place
- Location within Georgia Location within the United States
- Coordinates: 31°9′56″N 82°43′5″W
- Country: United States
- State: Georgia
- County: Clinch

Area
  - Total: 0.89 sq mi (2.31 km^{2})
  - Land: 0.89 sq mi (2.31 km^{2})
  - Water: 0 sq mi (0.00 km^{2})
- Elevation: 186 ft (57 m)

Population (2020)
  - Total: 23
  - Density: 25.8/sq mi (9.97/km^{2})
- Time zone: UTC-5 (Eastern (EST))
  - Summer (DST): UTC-4 (EDT)
- ZIP Code: 31634 (Homerville)
- Area code: 912
- FIPS code: 13-17468
- GNIS feature ID: 2812673

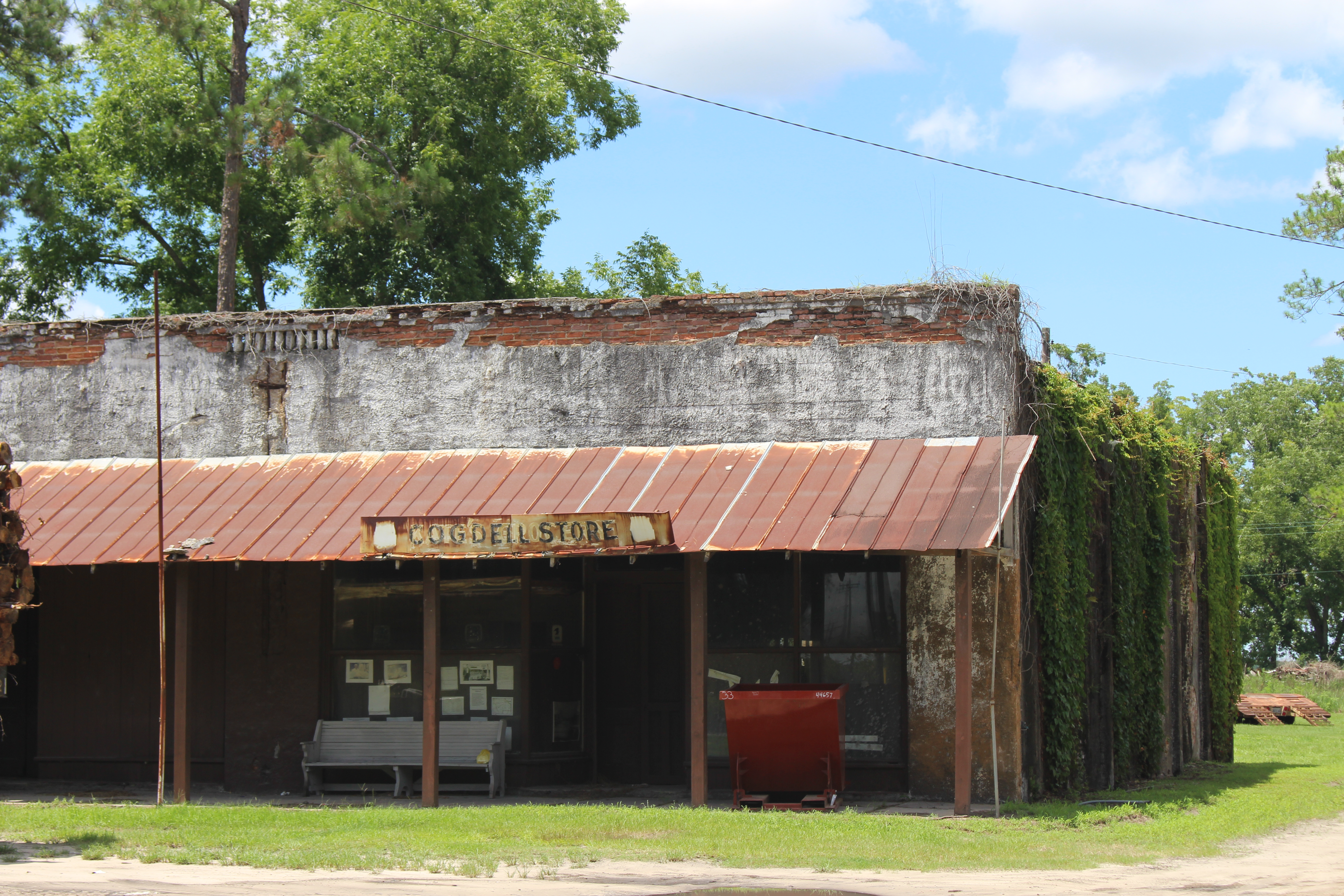
Old Cogdell Store, Clinch County, Georgia

Cogdell is an unincorporated community and census-designated place (CDP) in the northeast corner of Clinch County, Georgia, United States. It is on Georgia State Route 122, 22 miles (35 km) west of Waycross and 24 miles (39 km) east of Lakeland. Homerville, the Clinch county seat, is 10 miles (16 km) to the south.

The 2020 census listed a population of 23.

== Demographics ==
Historical population
Census	Pop.	Note	%±
2020	23		—
U.S. Decennial Census; 1850-1870 1870-1880; 1890-1910 1920-1930; 1940 1950 1960; 1970 1980 1990; 2000 2010-2020

Cogdell was first listed as a census designated place in the 2020 census.

=== 2020 census ===
Cogdell CDP, Georgia – Racial and ethnic composition Note: the US Census treats Hispanic/Latino as an ethnic category. This table excludes Latinos from the racial categories and assigns them to a separate category. Hispanics/Latinos may be of any race.
Race / Ethnicity (NH = Non-Hispanic)	Pop 2020	% 2020
White alone (NH)	23	100.00%
Black or African American alone (NH)	0	0.00%
Native American or Alaska Native alone (NH)	0	0.00%
Asian alone (NH)	0	0.00%
Pacific Islander alone (NH)	0	0.00%
Some Other Race alone (NH)	0	0.00%
Mixed Race or Multi-Racial (NH)	0	0.00%
Hispanic or Latino (any race)	0	0.00%
Total	23	100.00%

== Notable people ==
- Russ Goodman, politician
- Ossie Davis, American actor and director
