= Georgia's 9th Senate district =

American legislative district

Georgia's 9th State Senate district
Senator
Nikki Merritt; D–Grayson
- Demographics: 32.04% White; 28.46% Black; 21.09% Hispanic; 13.98% Asian; 0.18% Native American; 0.03% Hawaiian/Pacific Islander; 0.72% Other; 4.73% Multiracial
- Population (2020) • Voting age: 192,915; 142,054

District 9 of the Georgia Senate is a senatorial district in northeastern Metro Atlanta.

The district, located entirely within Gwinnett County, includes parts of Five Forks, Grayson, Lawrenceville, Lilburn, Loganville, Mountain Park, and Snellville.

The current senator is Nikki Merritt, a Democrat from Grayson first elected in 2020, and re-elected in 2024.
