= Georgia's 34th Senate district =

American legislative district

Georgia's 34th State Senate district
Senator
| Kenya Wicks; D–Fayetteville |
- Demographics: 11.11% White; 66.60% Black; 14.82% Hispanic; 3.90% Asian; 0.23% Native American; 0.04% Hawaiian/Pacific Islander; 0.60% Other; 3.63% Multiracial
- Population (2020) • Voting age: 190,668; 141,840

District 34 of the Georgia Senate is located in southern Metro Atlanta.

The district includes northwestern Clayton County and northeastern Fayette County, including parts of College Park, Conley, Fayetteville, Forest Park, Jonesboro, Lake City, Morrow, and Riverdale. The district includes most of Hartsfield-Jackson Atlanta International Airport.

The current senator is Kenya Wicks, a Democrat from Fayetteville first elected in 2024.

== List of senators ==
| Member | Party | Years | Residence | Electoral history | Counties |
|---|---|---|---|---|---|
| Charlie Brown | | | | | |
| Standish Thompson | | January 11, 1965 – January 9, 1967 | | | |
| W. Armstrong Smith | | 1967–1975 | | | |
| ? | | | | | |
| Ed Johnson | | 1977-1981 | College Park, Palmetto | | |
| Bev Engram | | 1981–1989 | Fairburn | | |
| Pam Glanton | | 1989–1999 | Riverdale | | |
| Greg Hecht | | 1999 – January 13, 2003 | Jonesboro | | |
| Valencia Seay | | January 13, 2003 – January 13, 2025 | Riverdale | | |
| Kenya Wicks | | 2025–present | Fayetteville | | |
