= Donzella James =

American politician (born 1948)

Member of the Georgia State Senate from the 35th district
- Incumbent
- Assumed office December 13, 2009
- Preceded by: Kasim Reed
- In office January 9, 1995 – January 13, 2003
- Preceded by: Arthur Langford Jr.
- Succeeded by: Kasim Reed

Personal details
- Born: May 3, 1948 (age 78)
- Party: Democratic

Donzella James (née Johnson; born May 3, 1948) is an American politician who has served as a member of the Georgia State Senate since 2009. She is a member of the Democratic Party.

== Biography ==
James earned a bachelor's degree in criminal justice and political science from Morris Brown College and has received honorary doctorates from Emmanuel Bible College and Bible Of Christ Bible College and Seminary in Nigeria.

James is a member of the Georgia State Senate from the 35th District, serving since 2009. James serves as the Chairwoman of Interstate Competition and is also a member of the Education and Youth, Special Judiciary, and Economic Development committees. She is a member of the Democratic party.

== Personal life ==
James is Catholic.
