= Carden Summers =

American politician (born 1947)

Member of the Georgia State Senate from the 13th district
- Incumbent
- Assumed office March 9, 2020
- Preceded by: Greg Kirk

Personal details
- Born: August 27, 1947 (age 79) Crisp County, Georgia, U.S.
- Party: Republican

Carden H. Summers (born August 27, 1947) is an American politician from Cordele, Georgia. Summers is a Republican member of the Georgia State Senate for District 13.

In 2023, he was one of the sponsors of SB140, a bill regulating medical rights for transgender youth. The bill has been widely criticized as harmful to this population.

In January 2024, Summers co-sponsored S.B. 390, which would withhold government funding for any libraries in Georgia affiliated with the American Library Association.
