= Russ Goodman =

American politician

Member of the Georgia State Senate from the 8th district
- Incumbent
- Assumed office January 11, 2021
- Preceded by: C. Ellis Black

Personal details
- Born: Rustin Ed Goodman; April 14, 1977 (age 49) Cogdell, Georgia
- Party: Republican

Rustin Ed Goodman is an American politician from Georgia. Goodman is a Republican member of the Georgia State Senate for District 8.

In January 2024, Goodman co-sponsored S.B. 390, which would withhold government funding for any libraries in Georgia affiliated with the American Library Association.
