= David Lucas (American politician) =

American politician

Member of the Georgia State Senate from the 26th district
- Incumbent
- Assumed office January 14, 2013
- Preceded by: Miriam Paris

Member of the Georgia House of Representatives
- In office January 13, 1975 – July 1, 2011
- Succeeded by: James Beverly
- Constituency: 102nd district (1975–1993); 124th district (1993–2003); 105th district (2003–2005); 139th district (2005–2011)

Personal details
- Born: David Eugene Lucas; April 23, 1950 (age 75) Peach County, Georgia, U.S.
- Party: Democratic
- Spouse: Elaine
- Children: 2, including Al

David Eugene Lucas Sr. (born April 23, 1950) is an American politician. He is a member of the Georgia State Senate from the 26th District, serving since 2012. He is a member of the Democratic party. Prior to being a Senator, he served in the Georgia House of Representatives from 1974 to 2011. Lucas is also a founding member of 100 Black Men of America. He is the father of gridiron football player Al Lucas who died during a game while playing for the Los Angeles Avengers.
