= Valencia Seay =

American politician

Member of the Georgia State Senate from the 34th district
- In office January 13, 2003 – January 13, 2025
- Preceded by: Greg Hecht
- Succeeded by: Kenya Wicks

Member of the Georgia House of Representatives from the 93rd district
- In office January 8, 2001 – January 13, 2003
- Preceded by: Frank I. Bailey Jr.
- Succeeded by: Curtis S. Jenkins

Personal details
- Born: July 6, 1953 (age 73) Atlanta, Georgia, United States
- Party: Democratic

Valencia Martin Seay (born July 6, 1953) is an American politician. She was a member of the Georgia State Senate from the 34th District, serving from 2003 until 2025. She is a member of the Democratic Party.
