= Ed Harbison =

American politician

Member of the Georgia State Senate from the 15th district
- Incumbent
- Assumed office January 11, 1993
- Preceded by: Sanford Bishop

Personal details
- Born: August 25, 1941 (age 85) Prattville, Alabama, U.S.
- Party: Democratic

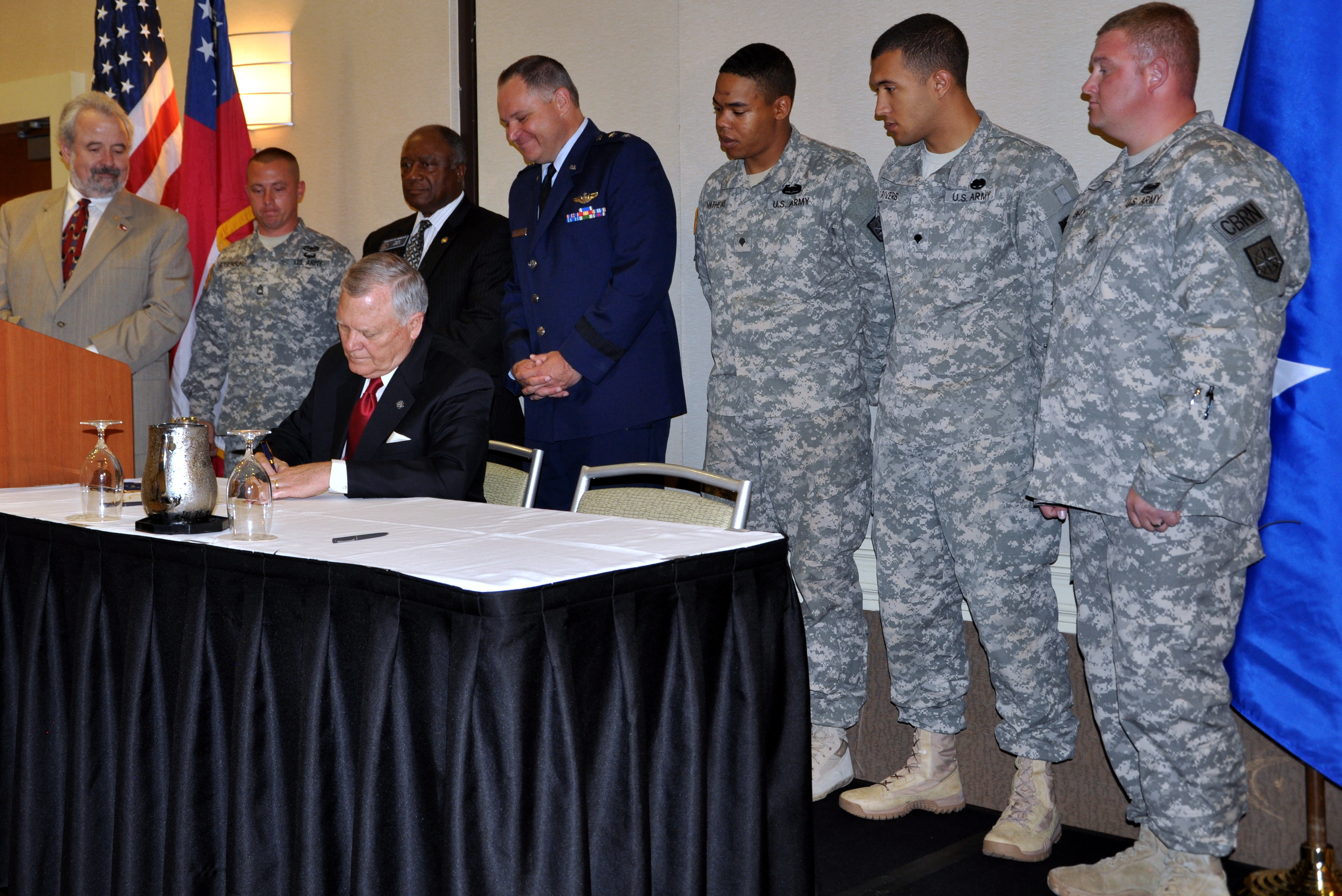
Harbison at a bill signing ceremony in 2014

Ed Harbison (born August 25, 1941) is an American politician. He is a member of the Georgia State Senate from the 15th District, serving since 1993. He is a member of the Democratic Party.

On March 3, 2026, Harbison announced that he would not run for re-election.
