= Kim Jackson (politician) =

American politician

Member of the Georgia State Senate from the 41st district
- Incumbent
- Assumed office January 11, 2021
- Preceded by: Steve Henson

Personal details
- Born: Kimberly Sue Jackson; August 25, 1984 (age 42) West Virginia, U.S.
- Party: Democratic
- Education: Furman University; Candler School of Theology (M.Div.)
- Website: Campaign website

Kimberly Sue Jackson (born August 25, 1984) is an American politician and Episcopal priest from the state of Georgia. A member of the Democratic Party, Jackson has represented the 41st district in the Georgia State Senate since January 2021. As a lesbian, she is Georgia's first openly LGBT+ state senator.

She was the first out priest of color to be ordained in the Episcopal Diocese of Atlanta. She serves as a vicar at the Church of the Common Ground, giving services for the homeless. She has also been a college chaplain, a consultant, a parish priest, and an activist.

== Early life and education ==
She studied at Furman University, graduating in 2006, and later graduated from Candler School of Theology at Emory University with a Master of Divinity (M.Div.). She moved to Atlanta at the age of 22.

== Personal life ==
Jackson is a lesbian. She lives on a farm in Stone Mountain with her wife, Trina, an imam.
