= Marty Harbin =

American politician

Member of the Georgia State Senate from the 16th district
- Incumbent
- Assumed office January 12, 2015
- Preceded by: Ronnie Chance

Personal details
- Born: April 2, 1955 (age 71) Atlanta, Georgia
- Party: Republican

Maurice Henderson Harbin (born April 2, 1955) is an American politician who has served in the Georgia State Senate from the 16th district since 2015.

In January 2024, Harbin co-sponsored S.B. 390, which would withhold government funding for any libraries in Georgia affiliated with the American Library Association. The bill was drafted following the election of ALA President Emily Drabinski and allegations of the organization promoting a personal ideology and influencing librarian certification.
