= Nikki Merritt =

American politician

Member of the Georgia State Senate from the 9th district
- Incumbent
- Assumed office January 11, 2021
- Preceded by: P.K. Martin IV

Personal details
- Born: February 9, 1972 (age 54)
- Party: Democratic
- Education: B.A. Georgia State University

Nikki Alexia-China Merritt (born February 9, 1972) is a Democratic politician. She was elected to become a member of the Georgia State Senate, representing the 9th District, on November 3, 2020. Merritt defeated Republican P. K. Martin IV for the seat.
