= Randy Robertson (politician) =

American politician

Member of the Georgia State Senate from the 29th district
- Incumbent
- Assumed office January 14, 2019
- Preceded by: Joshua McKoon

Personal details
- Born: Wiley Randall Robertson; October 6, 1962 (age 64) Hamilton, Georgia, U.S.
- Party: Republican

Wiley Randall Robertson (born October 6, 1962) is an American politician from Cataula, Georgia. He is a Republican member of the Georgia State Senate representing District 29, elected in 2018. Robertson is a retired law enforcement officer and attended Command College at Columbus State University and the FBI National Academy.

Robertson was a Law Enforcement Officer in the Muscogee County Sheriff's Office. In 2018, he was elected to the Georgia State Senate. He was reelected in the 2020 general elections.

== Early life and education ==
Robertson was born in Hamilton, Georgia to Bobby Ray and Elizabeth Cobb Robertson. He attended Cataula Elementary School, Harris County Junior High School, and Harris County High School. Robertson has four sisters.

== Career ==
Robertson was a Law Enforcement Officer before entering politics, and after over thirty years in law enforcement retired from the Muscogee County Sheriff’s Office in 2015.

In 2000 while serving with the Muscogee County Sheriff's office, Robertson was subject to an internal affairs investigation. The investigation concerned incidents involving sexual activity with his sister in law. The investigation determined that he had sexual activity with his sister in law at a public park frequented by children and at least once more at a shopping center. Robertsons Sister in law claimed this happened while he was on duty and it occurred in his squad car. Robertson has maintained that it did occur at the shopping center and the public park frequented by children but not in his squad car or while he was on duty. The sheriffs office investigation concluded that Robertsons conduct violated departmental standards, describing it as "unbecoming of an officer" and "Immoral"

=== Political career ===
In March 2024, Senate Majority Whip Randy Robertson of Cataula blocked a bill sponsored by State Rep. Scott Holcomb, that would open the door to compensation for wrongfully convicted individuals. Holcomb’s measure would have created a panel of appointees, all experts in wrongful convictions or criminal justice, to vet compensation claims while laying out clear guidelines for who qualifies. It also would have required that those who have been exonerated are compensated at a figure between $60,000 and $120,000 per year of wrongful imprisonment.

Robertson, a former sheriff’s deputy who led the effort to stop all compensation legislation in Georgia, said he thinks the system has been “hijacked” by organizations such as the Georgia Innocence Project, which uses DNA evidence and research to clear people’s names.

Robertson was elected to the Georgia State Senate in 2018 after the seat was vacated by Josh McKoon. In 2020, Robertson qualified for re-election and was not challenged in either the Primary or General election.

==== "Safe Communities Act of 2021" ====
On February 11, 2021, Robertson introduced Senate Bill 171, the "Safe Communities Act of 2021," which increases penalties for certain offenses committed during an "unlawful assembly." Robertson introduced the legislation in response to the George Floyd protests and the 2021 United States Capitol attack. The original bill failed to receive a committee vote before Georgia's crossover day. On March 18, Robertson reintroduced the legislation through a committee substitute of another bill from the state house. The American Civil Liberties Union of Georgia said the bill "tramples on and makes a mockery of the First Amendment." Mazey Lynn Causey, a legislative advocate for the Georgia Association of Criminal Defense Attorneys, believes that it would allow immunity for motorists that run over a protester.

== Personal life ==
Robertson is married to Theresa Garcia Robertson; He has one child with Theresa and three others from a previous marriage with eight grandchildren. The family goes to and worships with the First Baptist Church in Columbus.

== Electoral history ==
Georgia State Senate 29th District Election, 2018
Party	Candidate	Votes	%
Republican	Randy Robertson	44,149	62.99
Democratic	Valerie Haskins	25,937	37.01
