= Sonya Halpern =

American politician and marketing executive

Member of the Georgia State Senate from the 39th district
- Incumbent
- Assumed office January 11, 2021
- Preceded by: Nikema Williams

Personal details
- Born: October 11, 1967 (age 59)
- Party: Democratic
- Spouse: Daniel
- Children: 3
- Education: University of Massachusetts, Amherst (BA); University of Hartford (MBA)

Sonya McLaughlin Halpern (born October 11, 1967) is an American politician and former marketing executive who is a member of the Georgia State Senate representing the 39th district. Elected in December 2020 in a special Democratic primary election, she is currently serving in her third term.

== Education ==
Halpern earned a Bachelor of Arts degree in mass communication from the University of Massachusetts Amherst and a Master of Business Administration from the University of Hartford.

== Career ==
Halpern has been an active member of her community through various boards and non-profits. She currently serves on the Board of Directors for the YMCA of Metro Atlanta, is a member of the Board of Regents at the University of Hartford, and is an advisory board member for the DeVos Institute of Arts Management. She is a former Chair of the Board of Directors for The Children’s School as well as the National Black Arts Festival.

In 2011, President Barack Obama appointed her to the President’s Advisory Committee on the Arts at the John F. Kennedy Center for Performing Arts in Washington DC. Three years later when he appointed her as Chair, she became the first African-American and first person from Georgia to serve in this role since PACA’s inception in the 1950s.

After Nikema Williams was selected to replace John Lewis on the November ballot for Georgia's 5th congressional district, Halpern announced her candidacy for the special election to succeed her in the Georgia State Senate. She placed first in the special Democratic primary and defeated Linda Pritchett in the Democratic runoff.

Halpern was sworn in on January 11, 2021. She currently serves on Appropriations, the Banking and Financial Institutions Committee, the Education and Youth Committee, the Health and Human Services Committee, the Public Safety Committee and is Vice Chair of the Urban Affairs Committee.

In 2025, Halpern crossed party lines to vote in favor of a bill banning gender affirming care for transgender prisoners in Georgia state prisons.

== Personal life ==
Halpern's husband is the co-founder and CEO of Jackmont Hospitality, a minority-owned foodservice management company based in the Atlanta metropolitan area.
