= 2026 Georgia State Senate election =

- November 3, 2026

All 56 seats in the Georgia Senate 29 seats needed for a majority

	Majority party	Minority party
Leader	Jason Anavitarte	Harold V. Jones II
Party	Republican	Democratic
Leader since	June 17, 2025	January 13, 2025
Leader's seat	31st	22nd
Last election	33 seats, 55.67%	23 seats, 44.33%
Seats before	33	23
Seats won	29	27
Seat change	▼4	▲4
Popular vote	1,807,156	2,075,712
Percentage	46.54%	53.46%
Swing	▼9.13%	▲9.13%
- Results: Republican hold Democratic hold Democratic gain
Majority Leader before election
Steve Gooch (retiring)
Republican
Elected Majority Leader
Republican

The 2026 elections for the Georgia Senate took place on Tuesday, November 3, 2026, to elect state senators from all 56 districts.

== Retirements ==
=== Democratic ===
- District 10: Emanuel Jones is running for the U.S. House of Representatives.
- District 14: Josh McLaurin is running for Lieutenant Governor.

=== Republican ===
- District 19: Blake Tillery is running for Lieutenant Governor.
- District 27: Greg Dolezal is running for Lieutenant Governor.
- District 42: Brian Strickland is running for Attorney General.
- District 46: Bill Cowsert is running for Attorney General.
- District 51: Steve Gooch is running for Lieutenant Governor.

== Special elections ==
Five special elections were held during the 158th Georgia General Assembly.

=== 2025 ===
==== Senate district 21 ====
A special election was held on August 21, 2025, in Senate District 21 to fill the vacancy left by Republican Brandon Beach's resignation on May 4, 2025, to become treasurer of the United States. As no candidate received more than 50% of the vote, a runoff election between Democrat Debra Shigley and Republican Jason Dickerson was held on September 23, 2025, with Dickerson winning to serve the remainder of the 158th Georgia State Senate.

Senate district 21 special election
Party	Candidate	Votes	%
Democratic	Debra Shigley	8,444	39.52
Republican	Jason T. Dickerson	3,709	17.36
Republican	Steve West	3,642	17.04
Republican	Brian Will	2,192	10.26
Republican	Brice Futch	1,749	8.19
Republican	Lance Calvert	1,424	6.66
Republican	Stephanie Donegan	207	0.97
Total votes		21,367	100.00

Senate district 21 special election runoff
Party	Candidate	Votes	%
Republican	Jason T. Dickerson	19,065	61.46
Democratic	Debra Shigley	11,955	38.54
Total votes		31,020	100.00
Republican hold			

==== Senate district 35 ====
A special election was held on November 18, 2025, in Senate District 35 to fill the vacancy left by Democratic Jason Esteves's resignation on September 10, 2025, to focus on his campaign for governor. As no candidate received more than 50% of the vote, a runoff election between Democrats Jaha Howard and Roger Bruce was held on December 16, 2025, with Howard winning to serve the remainder of the 158th Georgia State Senate.

Senate district 35 special election
Party	Candidate	Votes	%
Democratic	Jaha V. Howard	5,135	32.63
Democratic	Roger Bruce	3,992	25.37
Republican	Josh Tolbert	2,765	17.57
Democratic	Erica-Denise Solomon	2,721	17.29
Democratic	John D. Williams	832	5.29
Independent	Corenza Morris	290	1.84
Total votes		15,735	100.00

Senate district 35 special election runoff
Party	Candidate	Votes	%
Democratic	Jaha V. Howard	3,232	51.92
Democratic	Roger Bruce	2,993	48.08
Total votes		6,225	100.00
Democratic hold			

=== 2026 ===
==== Senate district 18 ====
A special election was held on January 20, 2026, in Senate District 18 to fill the vacancy left by Republican John F. Kennedy's resignation on December 8, 2025, to focus on his campaign for lieutenant governor. As no candidate received more than 50% of the vote, a runoff election between Democrat LeMario Nicholas Brown and Republican Steven McNeel was held on February 17, 2026, with McNeel winning to serve the remainder of the 158th Georgia State Senate.

Senate district 18 special election
Party	Candidate	Votes	%
Democratic	LeMario Nicholas Brown	7,947	36.93
Republican	Steven McNeel	4,581	21.29
Republican	Eric S. Wilson	4,357	20.25
Republican	Lauren Daniel	4,052	18.83
Republican	Nathan Warnock	310	1.44
Republican	Eugene Allison	271	1.26
Total votes		21,518	100.00

Senate district 18 special election runoff
Party	Candidate	Votes	%
Republican	Steven McNeel	14,998	59.41
Democratic	LeMario Nicholas Brown	10,247	40.59
Total votes		25,245	100.00
Republican hold			

==== Senate district 53 ====
A special election was held on March 10, 2026, in Senate District 53 to fill the vacancy left by Republican Colton Moore's resignation on January 13, 2026, to focus on his campaign for Georgia's 14th congressional district. As no candidate received more than 50% of the vote, a runoff election between Republican Lanny Thomas and Democrat John Bentley "Jack" Zibluk was held on April 7, 2026, with Thomas winning to serve the remainder of the 158th Georgia State Senate.

Senate district 53 special election
Party	Candidate	Votes	%
Republican	Lanny Thomas	11,799	38.70
Democratic	John Bentley "Jack" Zibluk	8,228	26.99
Republican	Denise Pierce Burns	6,372	20.90
Republican	Blake Elsberry	4,087	13.41
Total votes		30,486	100.00

Senate district 53 special election runoff
Party	Candidate	Votes	%
Republican	Lanny Thomas	22,133	68.66
Democratic	John Bentley "Jack" Zibluk	10,102	31.34
Total votes		32,235	100.00
Republican hold			

==== Senate district 7 ====
A special election was held on May 19, 2026, in Senate District 7 to fill the vacancy left by Democrat Nabilah Parkes's resignation on March 13, 2026, to focus on her campaign for lieutenant governor. As no candidate received more than 50% of the vote, a runoff election between Republican Aizaz Shahbaz Shaikh and Democrat Adrienne White was held on June 16, 2026, with White winning to serve the remainder of the 158th Georgia State Senate. The election and runoff took place concurrently with the regularly-scheduled state primary and primary runoff elections. During the runoff, there were more high-profile races in the Republican primary than the Democratic primary, significantly boosting Republican turnout relative to the first round, leading to fears among Democrats that this turnout could carry Shaikh to victory, flipping the seat. White heavily campaigned during the final days of the race, including with Democratic gubernatorial nominee Keisha Lance Bottoms, to prevent the seat from flipping, winning a narrow victory.

Senate district 7 special election
Party	Candidate	Votes	%
Republican	Aizaz Shahbaz Shaikh	9,896	33.70
Democratic	Adrienne White	9,798	33.37
Democratic	Astrid S. Ross	9,671	32.93
Total votes		29,365	100.00

Senate district 7 special election runoff
Party	Candidate	Votes	%
Democratic	Adrienne White	8,504	51.12
Republican	Aizaz Shahbaz Shaikh	8,130	48.88
Total votes		16,634	100.00

== Predictions ==
The Atlanta Journal-Constitution identified Senate District 48 among five districts most likely to flip from Republican to Democratic control in 2026.

Source	Ranking	As of
Sabato's Crystal Ball	Likely R	January 22, 2026
State Navigate	Likely R	August 27, 2026

== Results summary ==
- † denotes a retiring incumbent.

District	2024 Pres.	Incumbent	Party	Elected	Party
1st	R+14.1	Ben Watson	Rep	Ben Watson	Rep
2nd	D+42.9	Derek Mallow	Dem	Derek Mallow	Dem
3rd	R+35.4	Mike Hodges	Rep	Mike Hodges	Rep
4th	R+35.2	Billy Hickman	Rep	Billy Hickman	Rep
5th	D+33.2	Sheikh Rahman	Dem	Sheikh Rahman	Dem
6th	R+40.3	Matt Brass	Rep	Matt Brass	Rep
7th	D+14.2	Adrienne White	Dem	Ruwa Romman	Dem
8th	R+34.7	Russ Goodman	Rep	Russ Goodman	Rep
9th	D+20.6	Nikki Merritt	Dem	Nikki Merritt	Dem
10th	D+69.7	Emanuel Jones†	Dem	Larry Johnson	Dem
11th	R+34.6	Sam Watson	Rep	Sam Watson	Rep
12th	D+14.1	Freddie Sims†	Dem	Edward Brown	Dem
13th	R+42.7	Carden Summers	Rep	Carden Summers	Rep
14th	D+18.1	Josh McLaurin†	Dem	Kevin Abel	Dem
15th	D+29.6	Ed Harbison†	Dem	Teddy Reese	Dem
16th	R+26.0	Marty Harbin	Rep	Marty Harbin	Rep
17th	D+52.8	Gail Davenport	Dem	Gail Davenport	Dem
18th	R+22.5	Steven McNeel	Rep	Steven McNeel	Rep
19th	R+53.4	Blake Tillery†	Rep	David Sikes	Rep
20th	R+32.4	Larry Walker III	Rep	Larry Walker III	Rep
21st	R+34.0	Jason Dickerson	Rep	Jason Dickerson	Rep
22nd	D+40.9	Harold V. Jones II	Dem	Harold V. Jones II	Dem
23rd	R+18.1	Max Burns	Rep	Max Burns	Rep
24th	R+36.8	Lee Anderson	Rep	Lee Anderson	Rep
25th	R+23.7	Rick Williams	Rep	Rick Williams	Rep
26th	D+25.0	David Lucas	Dem	David Lucas	Dem
27th	R+38.0	Greg Dolezal†	Rep	Mike Dudgeon	Rep
28th	D+51.4	Donzella James	Dem	Donzella James	Dem
29th	R+25.5	Randy Robertson	Rep	Randy Robertson	Rep
30th	R+27.8	Tim Bearden	Rep	Tim Bearden	Rep
31st	R+29.5	Jason Anavitarte	Rep	Jason Anavitarte	Rep
32nd	R+12.6	Kay Kirkpatrick	Rep	Kay Kirkpatrick	Rep
33rd	D+29.7	Michael Rhett	Dem	Michael Rhett	Dem
34th	D+63.4	Kenya Wicks	Dem	Kenya Wicks	Dem
35th	D+56.1	Jaha Howard	Dem	Jaha Howard	Dem
36th	D+76.9	Nan Orrock	Dem	Nan Orrock	Dem
37th	R+8.6	Ed Setzler	Rep	Darcy Castro	Dem
38th	D+55.3	RaShaun Kemp	Dem	RaShaun Kemp	Dem
39th	D+69.9	Sonya Halpern	Dem	Sonya Halpern	Dem
40th	D+27.9	Sally Harrell	Dem	Sally Harrell	Dem
41st	D+62.9	Kim Jackson	Dem	Kim Jackson	Dem
42nd	R+11.9	Brian Strickland†	Rep	Eric Lee	Dem
43rd	D+53.3	Tonya Anderson	Dem	Tonya Anderson	Dem
44th	D+77.5	Elena Parent†	Dem	Saira Draper	Dem
45th	R+14.2	Clint Dixon	Rep	Anthony Tippetts	Dem
46th	R+19.7	Bill Cowsert†	Rep	Marc McMain	Rep
47th	R+21.9	Frank Ginn	Rep	Frank Ginn	Rep
48th	R+4.5	Shawn Still	Rep	Laura Murvartian	Dem
49th	R+44.3	Drew Echols	Rep	Drew Echols	Rep
50th	R+64.2	Bo Hatchett	Rep	Bo Hatchett	Rep
51st	R+64.2	Steve Gooch†	Rep	Will Wade	Rep
52nd	R+48.0	Chuck Hufstetler	Rep	Chuck Hufstetler	Rep
53rd	R+58.2	Lanny Thomas	Rep	Lanny Thomas	Rep
54th	R+55.4	Chuck Payne	Rep	Chuck Payne	Rep
55th	D+54.4	Randal Mangham	Dem	Randal Mangham	Dem
56th	R+12.4	John Albers	Rep	John Albers	Rep

== Detailed results ==
=== District 1 ===
The first Senate district is in Southeast Georgia encompassing most of Savannah's southern and eastern suburbs, as well as a sliver of Savannah itself. The district includes all of Bryan and Liberty counties. The district also includes coastal and southwestern Chatham County.

Incumbent Ben Watson, a Republican, first elected in 2014, won unopposed in 2024 and ran for re-election. Republican Donald Trump won this district with 56.8 percent of the vote at the 2024 presidential election.

1st district Democratic primary
Party	Candidate	Votes	%
Democratic	Corey Foreman	9,200	58.6
Democratic	Barbara Gooby	6,504	41.4
Total votes		15,704	100.0

District 1 general election
Party	Candidate	Votes	%
Republican	Ben Watson (incumbent)	38,705	52.23
Democratic	Corey Foreman	35,396	47.77
Total votes		74,101	100.00
Republican hold			

=== District 2 ===
The second Senate district is in Southeast Georgia encompassing most of the city of Savannah and northwestern Chatham County.

The incumbent for this seat is Derek Mallow, a Democrat first elected in 2022. He was re-elected unopposed in 2024.

District 2 general election
Party	Candidate	Votes	%
Democratic	Derek Mallow (incumbent)	54,214	100.00
Total votes		54,214	100.00
Democratic hold			

=== District 3 ===
The third Senate district is in Southeast Georgia covering most of Coastal Georgia south of Savannah, including all of Brantley, Camden, Charlton, Glynn, and McIntosh counties and part of Ware County.

Incumbent Mike Hodges, a Republican first elected in 2022, was re-elected unopposed in 2024.

District 3 general election
Party	Candidate	Votes	%
Republican	Mike Hodges (incumbent)	53,529	100.00
Total votes		53,529	100.00
Republican hold			

=== District 4 ===
The fourth Senate district is in Southeast Georgia covering Bulloch, Candler, Effingham, Evans, and part of Chatham counties.

Incumbent Billy Hickman, a Republican first elected in 2020, was re-elected unopposed in 2024.

District 4 general election
Party	Candidate	Votes	%
Republican	Billy Hickman (incumbent)	50,538	100.00
Total votes		50,538	100.00
Republican hold			

=== District 5 ===
The fifth Senate district is located in Gwinnett County in northeastern Metro Atlanta. It includes parts of Norcross, Lawrenceville, and Lilburn.

Incumbent Sheikh Rahman, a Democrat first elected in 2018, was re-elected with 67.61% of the vote in 2024.

5th district Democratic primary
Party	Candidate	Votes	%
Democratic	Sheikh Rahman (incumbent)	6,188	54.50
Democratic	Robin McCoy	5,166	45.50
Total votes		11,354	100.0

District 5 general election
Party	Candidate	Votes	%
Democratic	Sheikh Rahman (incumbent)	35,109	100.00
Total votes		35,109	100.00
Democratic hold			

=== District 6 ===
The sixth Senate district is located in southwestern Metro Atlanta. It includes Coweta, Heard, and parts of Carrol counties.

Incumbent Matt Brass, a Republican first elected in 2016, was re-elected with 72.31% of the vote in 2024.

District 6 general election
Party	Candidate	Votes	%
Republican	Matt Brass (incumbent)	55,673	66.09
Democratic	Jermarkus Jacobs	28,563	33.91
Total votes		84,236	100.00
Republican hold			

=== District 7 ===
The seventh Senate district is located in Gwinnett County in northeastern Metro Atlanta.

Nabilah Parkes, a Democrat first elected in 2022, resigned in March to focus on her campaign for Lieutenant Governor. She was replaced in a special election by Adrienne White, who pledged not to run for re-election.

7th district Democratic primary
Party	Candidate	Votes	%
Democratic	Ruwa Romman	6,859	38.21
Democratic	Rahul Garabadu	5,960	33.20
Democratic	Astrid Ross	5,133	28.59
Total votes		17,952	100.0

7th district Democratic primary runoff
Party	Candidate	Votes	%
Democratic	Ruwa Romman	4,638	60.12
Democratic	Rahul Garabadu	3,076	39.88
Total votes		7,714	100.0

District 7 general election
Party	Candidate	Votes	%
Democratic	Ruwa Romman	45,729	66.00
Republican	Aizaz Shaikh	23,556	34.00
Total votes		69,285	100.00
Democratic hold			

=== District 8 ===
The eighth Senate district is located in South Georgia. It includes all of Atkinson, Clinch, Echols, Lanier, Lowndes, and Pierce counties and part of Ware County.

Incumbent Russ Goodman, a Republican first elected in 2020, was re-elected unopposed in 2024.

District 8 general election
Party	Candidate	Votes	%
Republican	Russ Goodman (incumbent)	44,698	100.00
Total votes		44,698	100.00
Republican hold			

=== District 9 ===
The ninth Senate district is located in Gwinnett County in northeastern Metro Atlanta.

Incumbent Nikki Merritt, a Democrat first elected in 2020, was re-elected with 59.95% of the vote in 2024.

District 9 general election
Party	Candidate	Votes	%
Democratic	Nikki Merritt (incumbent)	52,989	71.07
Republican	Michael Johnson	21,570	28.93
Total votes		74,559	100.00
Democratic hold			

=== District 10 ===
The tenth Senate district is located in eastern Metro Atlanta in DeKalb and Henry counties. It includes Avondale Estates, Belvedere Park, Candler-McAfee, Conley, Ellenwood, North Decatur, North Druid Hills, Panthersville, Rex, Scottdale, Stockbridge, and Stonecrest.

Incumbent Emanuel Jones, a Democrat first elected in 2004, retired to run for US House.

10th district Democratic primary
Party	Candidate	Votes	%
Democratic	Larry Johnson	21,292	47.73
Democratic	Gabrielle Rogers	11,898	26.67
Democratic	Kate Denny	9,448	21.18
Democratic	Sylvester Smith	1,971	4.42
Total votes		44,609	100.0

10th district Democratic primary runoff
Party	Candidate	Votes	%
Democratic	Larry Johnson	12,674	65.22
Democratic	Gabrielle Rogers	6,732	34.78
Total votes		19,356	100.0

District 10 general election
Party	Candidate	Votes	%
Democratic	Larry Johnson	80,838	89.78
Republican	Furquan Stafford	9,200	10.22
Total votes		90,038	100.00
Democratic hold			

=== District 11 ===
The eleventh Senate district is located in the Wiregrass region in Southwest Georgia, including all of Brooks, Colquitt, Cook, Decatur, Grady, Seminole, and Thomas counties.

Incumbent Sam Watson, a Republican first elected in 2022, was re-elected unopposed in 2024.

District 11 general election
Party	Candidate	Votes	%
Republican	Sam Watson (incumbent)	46,219	100.00
Total votes		46,219	100.00
Republican hold			

=== District 12 ===
The twelfth Senate district is located in Southwest Georgia, including all of Baker, Calhoun, Clay, Dougherty, Early, Miller, Mitchell, Quitman, Randolph, Stewart, Sumter, Terrell, and Webster counties.

Incumbent Freddie Powell Sims, a Democrat first elected in 2008, withdrew her candidacy in March due to her husband's illness.

12th district Democratic primary
Party	Candidate	Votes	%
Democratic	Edward Brown	7,890	53.78
Democratic	Corey Morgan	4,138	28.21
Democratic	Tracy Taylor	2,642	18.01
Total votes		14,670	100.0

District 12 general election
Party	Candidate	Votes	%
Democratic	Edward Brown	46,632	100.00
Total votes		46,632	100.00
Democratic hold			

=== District 13 ===
The thirteenth Senate district is located in South Georgia, including all of Ben Hill, Berrien, Crisp, Irwin, Lee, Tift, Turner, and Worth counties, as well as the western part of Coffee County.

Incumbent Carden Summers, a Republican first elected in 2020, was re-elected unopposed in 2024.

District 13 general election
Party	Candidate	Votes	%
Republican	Carden Summers (incumbent)	50,370	100.00
Total votes		50,370	100.00
Republican hold			

=== District 14 ===
The fourteenth Senate district is located Fulton County in northern Metro Atlanta.

Incumbent Josh McLaurin, a Democrat first elected in 2020, retired to run for Lieutenant Governor.

14th district Democratic primary
Party	Candidate	Votes	%
Democratic	Kevin Abel	7,534	37.44
Democratic	Nathalie Kanani	6,564	32.62
Democratic	Kay Howell	6,024	29.94
Total votes		20,122	100.0

14th district Democratic primary runoff
Party	Candidate	Votes	%
Democratic	Kevin Abel	4,317	50.85
Democratic	Nathalie Kanani	4,172	49.15
Total votes		8,489	100.0

14th district Republican primary
Party	Candidate	Votes	%
Republican	Mike Dvorscak	7,482	63.79
Republican	Carson McQueen	3,063	26.11
Republican	Tamara Johnson-Shealey	1,185	10.10
Total votes		11,730	100.0

District 14 general election
Party	Candidate	Votes	%
Democratic	Kevin Abel	50,505	62.76
Republican	Mike Dvorscak	29,971	37.24
Total votes		80,476	100.00
Democratic hold			

=== District 15 ===
The fifteenth Senate district is located West and Southwest Georgia. The district is anchored in Columbus and includes most of Columbus-Muscogee County as well as all of Chattahoochee, Macon, Marion, Schley, Talbot, and Taylor counties.

Ed Harbison, a Democrat first elected in 1992, announced his retirement in March.

15th district Democratic primary
Party	Candidate	Votes	%
Democratic	Teddy Reese	11,989	58.76
Democratic	Edward Harbison	5,574	27.32
Democratic	Alyssa Williams	2,841	13.92
Total votes		20,404	100.0

District 15 general election
Party	Candidate	Votes	%
Democratic	Teddy Reese	36,680	71.25
Republican	Chuck Hand	14,804	28.75
Total votes		51,484	100.00
Democratic hold			

=== District 16 ===
The sixteenth Senate district is located in southern Metro Atlanta, including the southern and western parts of Fayette County as well as all of Lamar, Pike, and Spalding counties.

Incumbent Marty Harbin, a Republican first elected in 2014, was re-elected with 65.77% of the vote in 2024.

16th district Democratic primary
Party	Candidate	Votes	%
Democratic	Sonya Hawkins	11,610	72.62
Democratic	Pauline Henley	4,377	27.38
Total votes		15,987	100.0

District 16 general election
Party	Candidate	Votes	%
Republican	Marty Harbin	51,365	58.41
Democratic	Sonya Hawkins	36,569	41.59
Total votes		87,934	100.00
Republican hold			

=== District 17 ===
The seventeenth Senate district is located in southern Metro Atlanta. The district contains southern Clayton County and western Henry County.

Incumbent Gail Davenport, a Democrat first elected in 2006, was re-elected unopposed in 2024.

16th district Democratic primary
Party	Candidate	Votes	%
Democratic	Gail Davenport (incumbent)	26,832	81.38
Democratic	Duro Haynes	6,138	18.62
Total votes		32,970	100.0

District 17 general election
Party	Candidate	Votes	%
Democratic	Gail Davenport (incumbent)	73,397	100.00
Total votes		73,397	100.00
Democratic hold			

=== District 18 ===
The eighteenth Senate district is located in Central Georgia in the Macon metropolitan area. The district includes western Macon-Bibb County, northwestern Houston County, and all of Crawford, Monroe, Peach, and Upson counties.

Incumbent John F. Kennedy, a Republican first elected in 2014, resigned in December to focus on his campaign for Lieutenant Governor. Republican Steven McNeel won the special election to replace him.

18th district Republican primary
Party	Candidate	Votes	%
Republican	Steven McNeel (incumbent)	20,694	90.21
Republican	Eugene Allison	2,247	9.79
Total votes		22,941	100.0

District 18 general election
Party	Candidate	Votes	%
Republican	Steven McNeel (incumbent)	58,730	100.00
Total votes		58,730	100.00
Republican hold			

=== District 19 ===
The nineteenth Senate district is located in Central Georgia. It includes Appling, Bacon, eastern Coffee, Jeff Davis, Long, Montgomery, Tattnall, Telfair, Toombs, Wayne, and Wheeler counties.

Incumbent Blake Tillery, a Republican first elected in 2016, retired to run for Lieutenant Governor.

19th district Democratic primary
Party	Candidate	Votes	%
Democratic	Joshua Wilkerson	4,286	66.91
Democratic	Eddy Delgado	2,120	33.09
Total votes		6,409	100.0

19th district Republican primary
Party	Candidate	Votes	%
Republican	David Sikes	12,739	57.07
Republican	Dwayne Gillis	7,717	34.57
Republican	Travis Hodges	1,867	8.36
Total votes		22,323	100.0

District 19 general election
Party	Candidate	Votes	%
Republican	David Sikes	39,582	70.68
Democratic	Joshua Wilkerson	16,423	29.32
Total votes		56,005	100.00
Republican hold			

=== District 20 ===
The twentieth Senate district is located in Central Georgia. It includes Bleckley, Dodge, Dooly, southern Houston, Laurens, Pulaski, Treutlen, and Wilcox counties.

Incumbent Larry Walker III, a Republican first elected in 2015, was re-elected unopposed in 2024.

District 20 general election
Party	Candidate	Votes	%
Republican	Larry Walker III (incumbent)	58,829	100.00
Total votes		58,829	100.00
Republican hold			

=== District 21 ===
The twenty-first Senate district is located in northern Metro Atlanta, including Cherokee and Fulton counties.

Incumbent Brandon Beach, a Republican first elected in 2012, resigned in May to become Treasurer of the United States. Republican Jason Dickerson won the special election to replace him.

District 21 general election
Party	Candidate	Votes	%
Republican	Jason Dickerson	60,092	64.29
Democratic	Kori Simmons	33,377	35.71
Total votes		93,469	100.00
Republican hold			

=== District 22 ===
The twenty-second Senate district is located in the Augusta metropolitan area in East Georgia, including most of Augusta-Richmond county.

Incumbent Harold V. Jones II, a Democrat first elected in 2014, was re-elected unopposed in 2024.

District 22 general election
Party	Candidate	Votes	%
Democratic	Harold V. Jones II (incumbent)	53,405	100.00
Total votes		53,405	100.00
Democratic hold			

=== District 23 ===
The twenty-third Senate district is located in East Georgia, including southern Augusta-Richmond, Burke, western Columbia, Emanuel, Glascock, Jefferson, Jenkins, McDuffie, Screven, Taliaferro, and Warren counties.

Incumbent Max Burns, a Republican first elected in 2020, was re-elected with 61.84% of the vote in 2024.

23rd district Democratic primary
Party	Candidate	Votes	%
Democratic	Shanya Boston	10,973	72.26
Democratic	Satoria Ragin	4,212	27.74
Total votes		15,185	100.0

District 23 general election
Party	Candidate	Votes	%
Republican	Max Burns (incumbent)	37,457	53.50
Democratic	Shayna Boston	32,562	46.50
Total votes		70,019	100.00
Republican hold			

=== District 24 ===
The twenty-fourth Senate district is located in northeast Georgia, including of Elbert, Greene, Hart, Lincoln, Oglethorpe, Wilkes and parts of Columbia counties.

Incumbent Lee Anderson, a Republican first elected in 2016, was re-elected unopposed in 2024.

24th district Democratic primary
Party	Candidate	Votes	%
Democratic	Lorraine Thomas	8,799	74.87
Democratic	Catie Young	2,954	25.13
Total votes		11,753	100.0

District 24 general election
Party	Candidate	Votes	%
Republican	Lee Anderson (incumbent)	57,103	65.00
Democratic	Lorraine Thomas	30,753	35.00
Total votes		87,856	100.00
Republican hold			

=== District 25 ===
The twenty-fifth Senate district includes parts of Metro Atlanta, the Macon metropolitan area, and Central Georgia. The district includes all of Baldwin, Butts, southern Henry, Jasper, Jones, northern Macon-Bibb, and Putnam counties.

Incumbent Rick Williams, a Republican first elected in 2022, was re-elected unopposed in 2024.

District 25 general election
Party	Candidate	Votes	%
Republican	Rick Williams (incumbent)	57,824	100.00
Total votes		57,824	100.00
Republican hold			

=== District 26 ===
The twenty-sixth Senate district is based in the Macon metropolitian area. It includes much of central Macon and Bibb County, northern Houston County and part of Warner Robins, and all of Hancock, Johnson, Twiggs, Washington, and Wilkinson counties to the east of Macon.

Incumbent David Lucas, a Democrat first elected in 2012, was re-elected unopposed in 2024.

26th district Republican primary
Party	Candidate	Votes	%
Republican	Tracy Wheeler	4,450	56.93
Republican	Nancy Hicks	3,366	43.07
Total votes		7,816	100.0

District 26 general election
Party	Candidate	Votes	%
Democratic	David Lucas (incumbent)	40,504	68.41
Republican	Tracy Wheeler	18,705	31.59
Total votes		59,209	100.00
Democratic hold			

=== District 27 ===
The twenty-seventh Senate district is located in Forsyth County in northern Metro Atlanta.

Incumbent Greg Dolezal, a Republican first elected in 2018, retired to run for Lieutenant Governor.

27th district Republican primary
Party	Candidate	Votes	%
Republican	Mike Dudgeon	12,754	54.91
Republican	Carter Patterson	7,252	31.22
Republican	Marc Martinelli	2,094	9.02
Republican	Klaus Buck	1,127	4.85
Total votes		23,227	100.0

District 27 general election
Party	Candidate	Votes	%
Republican	Mike Dudgeon	52,048	63.28
Democratic	Jessica Roper	30,206	36.72
Total votes		82,254	100.00
Republican hold			

=== District 28 ===
The twenty-eighth Senate district is located in western Metro Atlanta across parts of Cobb, Douglas, and Fulton counties.

Incumbent Donzella James, a Democrat first elected in 2009, was re-elected unopposed in 2024.

28th district Democratic primary
Party	Candidate	Votes	%
Democratic	Donzella James (incumbent)	27,830	82.68
Democratic	Mel Keyton	5,830	17.32
Total votes		33,660	100.0

District 28 general election
Party	Candidate	Votes	%
Democratic	Donzella James (incumbent)	72,664	100.00
Total votes		72,664	100.00
Democratic hold			

=== District 29 ===
The twenty-ninth Senate district is located in West Georgia. The district includes all of Harris, Meriwether, and Troup counties, and northern parts of Columbus-Muscogee County.

Incumbent Randy Robertson, a Republican first elected in 2018, was re-elected with 65.23% of the vote in 2024.

District 29 general election
Party	Candidate	Votes	%
Republican	Randy Robertson (incumbent)	43,108	57.75
Democratic	Jeff Lowe	31,539	42.25
Total votes		74,647	100.00
Republican hold			

=== District 30 ===
The thirtieth Senate district is located in West Georgia and western Metro Atlanta, including northern Carroll, western Douglas, southwestern Paulding, and all of Haralson counties.

Incumbent Tim Bearden, a Republican, was first elected in a 2024 special election.

District 30 general election
Party	Candidate	Votes	%
Republican	Tim Bearden (incumbent)	41,640	55.76
Democratic	Wanda Cooper	33,037	44.24
Total votes		74,677	100.00
Republican hold			

=== District 31 ===
The thirty-first Senate district is located in Polk and Paulding counties in western Metro Atlanta.

Incumbent Jason Anavitarte, a Republican first elected in 2020 who serves as Majority Leader, was re-elected unopposed in 2024.

31st district Republican primary
Party	Candidate	Votes	%
Republican	Jason Anavitarte (incumbent)	16,474	79.30
Republican	Daniel Davenport	4,299	20.70
Total votes		20,773	100.0

31st district Democratic primary
Party	Candidate	Votes	%
Democratic	Alex Miller	8,555	69.46
Democratic	Josh Plancher	3,761	30.54
Total votes		12,316	100.0

District 31 general election
Party	Candidate	Votes	%
Republican	Jason Anavitarte (incumbent)	44,597	56.17
Democratic	Alec Miller	34,795	43.83
Total votes		79,392	100.00
Republican hold			

=== District 32 ===
The thirty-second Senate district is located in Cherokee and Cobb counties in northwestern Metro Atlanta.

Incumbent Kay Kirkpatrick, a Republican first elected in 2017, was re-elected unopposed in 2024.

District 32 general election
Party	Candidate	Votes	%
Republican	Kay Kirkpatrick (incumbent)	42,424	51.00
Democratic	Michael Hettig	40,763	49.00
Total votes		83,187	100.00
Republican hold			

=== District 33 ===
The thirty-third Senate district is located in Cobb county in northwestern Metro Atlanta.

Incumbent Michael Rhett, a Republican first elected in 2014, was re-elected unopposed in 2024.

District 33 general election
Party	Candidate	Votes	%
Democratic	Michael Rhett (incumbent)	57,651	100.00
Total votes		57,651	100.00
Democratic hold			

=== District 34 ===
The thirty-fourth Senate district is located in Clayton and Fayette counties in southern Metro Atlanta.

Incumbent Democrat Kenya Wicks was first elected with 81.95% of the vote in 2024.

34th district Democratic primary
Party	Candidate	Votes	%
Democratic	Kenya Wicks (incumbent)	19,778	77.95
Democratic	Gabriel Martin	5,594	22.05
Total votes		25,372	100.0

District 34 general election
Party	Candidate	Votes	%
Democratic	Kenya Wicks (incumbent)	54,864	100.00
Total votes		54,864	100.00
Democratic hold			

=== District 35 ===
The thirty-fifth Senate district is located in Cobb and Fulton counties in Metro Atlanta.

Incumbent Jason Esteves resigned in September 2025 to focus on his run for governor. Democrat Jaha Howard won the special election to replace him.

35th district Democratic primary
Party	Candidate	Votes	%
Democratic	Jaha Howard (incumbent)	22,257	65.63
Democratic	Erica-Denise Solomon	8,871	26.16
Democratic	Elfreda Desvignes	2,787	8.22
Total votes		33,915	100.0

District 35 general election
Party	Candidate	Votes	%
Democratic	Jaha Howard (incumbent)	74,072	100.00
Total votes		74,072	100.00
Democratic hold			

=== District 36 ===
The thirty-sixth Senate district is located in Fulton county in Metro Atlanta.

Incumbent Nan Orrock, a Democrat first elected in 2006, was re-elected unopposed in 2024.

District 36 general election
Party	Candidate	Votes	%
Democratic	Nan Orrock (incumbent)	72,091	91.97
Republican	Katie Corkren	6,293	8.03
Total votes		78,384	100.00
Democratic hold			

=== District 37 ===
The thirty-seventh Senate district is located in Bartow and Cobb counties in northwestern Metro Atlanta.

Incumbent Ed Setzler, a Republican first elected in 2022, was re-elected with 57.48% of the vote in 2024.

37th district Democratic primary
Party	Candidate	Votes	%
Democratic	Darcy Castro	13,638	68.17
Democratic	Zachary Neville	6,368	31.83
Total votes		20,006	100.0

District 37 general election
Party	Candidate	Votes	%
Democratic	Darcy Castro	47,653	50.76
Republican	Ed Setzler (incumbent)	46,232	49.24
Total votes		93,885	100.00
Democratic gain from Republican			

=== District 38 ===
The thirty-eighth Senate district is located in Fulton County in Metro Atlanta.

Incumbent Democrat RaShaun Kemp was first elected unopposed in 2024.

38th district Republican primary
Party	Candidate	Votes	%
Republican	Eric Helvy	3,432	66.90
Republican	Gregory Thomas	1,698	33.10
Total votes		5,130	100.0

District 38 general election
Party	Candidate	Votes	%
Democratic	RaShaun Kemp (incumbent)	68,348	81.06
Republican	Eric Helvy	15,969	18.94
Total votes		84,317	100.00
Democratic hold			

=== District 39 ===
The thirty-ninth Senate district is located in Fulton County in Metro Atlanta.

Incumbent Sonya Halpern, a Democrat first elected in 2020, was re-elected unopposed in 2024.

District 39 general election
Party	Candidate	Votes	%
Democratic	RaShaun Kemp (incumbent)	64,855	88.52
Republican	John Guest Jr.	8,407	11.48
Total votes		73,262	100.00
Democratic hold			

=== District 40 ===
The fortieth Senate district is located in DeKalb and Gwinnett counties in Metro Atlanta.

Incumbent Sally Harrell, a Democrat first elected in 2018, was re-elected with 62.64% of the vote in 2024.

District 40 general election
Party	Candidate	Votes	%
Democratic	Sally Harrell (incumbent)	48,578	69.64
Republican	Melina Mast	21,178	30.36
Total votes		69,756	100.00
Democratic hold			

=== District 41 ===
The forty-first Senate district is located in DeKalb county in Metro Atlanta.

Incumbent Kim Jackson, a Democrat first elected in 2020, was re-elected with 81.82% of the vote in 2024.

41st district Democratic primary
Party	Candidate	Votes	%
Democratic	Kim Jackson (incumbent)	21,181	75.52
Democratic	Shenika Maddox	6,865	24.48
Total votes		28,046	100.0

District 41 general election
Party	Candidate	Votes	%
Democratic	Kim Jackson (incumbent)	58,974	87.37
Republican	Jeff Newlin	8,426	12.63
Total votes		67,500	100.00
Democratic hold			

=== District 42 ===
The forty-second Senate district is located in the eastern suburbs of Atlanta. It includes Henry, Morgan, most of Newton, and southwestern Walton counties.

Incumbent Brian Strickland, a Republican first elected in 2018, retired to run for Attorney General.

District 42 general election
Party	Candidate	Votes	%
Democratic	Eric Lee	45,573	52.05
Republican	Bret Dunn	41,985	47.95
Total votes		87,558	100.00
Democratic gain from Republican			

=== District 43 ===
The forty-third Senate district contains Rockdale County and parts of DeKalb, Gwinnett and Newton counties.

Incumbent Tonya Anderson, a Democrat first elected in 2016, was re-elected unopposed in 2024.

43rd district Democratic primary
Party	Candidate	Votes	%
Democratic	Tonya Anderson (incumbent)	24,811	72.50
Democratic	Sharon Henderson	7,119	20.80
Democratic	Donald Ferguson	2,294	6.70
Total votes		34,224	100.0

District 43 general election
Party	Candidate	Votes	%
Democratic	Tonya Anderson (incumbent)	72,217	100.00
Total votes		72,217	100.00
Democratic hold			

=== District 44 ===
The forty-fourth Senate district is located in Clayton and DeKalb counties in Metro Atlanta.

Incumbent Elena Parent, a Democrat first elected in 2014, retired.

44th district Democratic primary
Party	Candidate	Votes	%
Democratic	Saira Draper (incumbent)	25,673	59.20
Democratic	Nadine Thomas	17,690	40.80
Total votes		43,363	100.0

District 44 general election
Party	Candidate	Votes	%
Democratic	Saira Draper (incumbent)	81,092	92.47
Republican	Ngozi Orabueze	6,601	7.53
Total votes		87,693	100.00
Democratic hold			

=== District 45 ===
The forty-fifth Senate district is located in Barrow and Gwinnett counties in eastern Metro Atlanta.

Incumbent Clint Dixon, a Republican first elected in 2020, was re-elected unopposed in 2024.

District 45 general election
Party	Candidate	Votes	%
Democratic	Scott Tippetts	39,546	52.40
Republican	Clint Dixon (incumbent)	35,924	47.60
Total votes		75,470	100.00
Democratic gain from Republican			

=== District 46 ===
The forty-sixth Senate district is located in eastern Metro Atlanta. It includes parts of Barrow, Clarke, Gwinnett, Oconee and Walton counties.

Incumbent Bill Cowsert, a Republican first elected in 2006, retired to run for Attorney General.

46th district Democratic primary
Party	Candidate	Votes	%
Democratic	Ray Smith	8,677	59.87
Democratic	William Gaulden	5,817	40.13
Total votes		14,494	100.0

46th district Republican primary
Party	Candidate	Votes	%
Republican	Marc McMain	9,768	43.22
Republican	Doug McKillip	7,812	34.65
Republican	Michael Broun	4,966	22.03
Total votes		22,546	100.0

46th district Republican primary runoff
Party	Candidate	Votes	%
Republican	Marc McMain	12,084	64.55
Republican	Doug McKillip	6,637	35.45
Total votes		18,721	100.0

District 46 general election
Party	Candidate	Votes	%
Republican	Marc McMain	44,682	54.66
Democratic	Ray Smith	37,063	45.34
Total votes		81,745	100.00
Republican hold			

=== District 47 ===
The forty-seventh Senate district is located in East Central Georgia, containing Madison County and parts of Barrow, Clarke and Jackson counties.

Incumbent Frank Ginn, a Republican first elected in 2010, was re-elected with 62.61% of the vote in 2024.

47th district Republican primary
Party	Candidate	Votes	%
Republican	Frank Ginn (incumbent)	10,379	51.01
Republican	Jason Black	9,969	48.99
Total votes		20,348	100.0

District 47 general election
Party	Candidate	Votes	%
Republican	Frank Ginn (incumbent)	42,644	100.00
Total votes		42,644	100.00
Republican hold			

=== District 48 ===
The forty-eighth Senate district is located in Metro Atlanta. It contains parts of Forsyth, Fulton and Gwinnett counties.

Incumbent Shawn Still, a Republican first elected in 2022, was re-elected with 53.58% of the vote in 2024.

48th district Democratic primary
Party	Candidate	Votes	%
Democratic	Laura Murvartian	8,301	63.71
Democratic	Nathan Hombroek	4,728	36.29
Total votes		13,029	100.0

District 48 general election
Party	Candidate	Votes	%
Democratic	Laura Murvartian	41,049	52.88
Republican	Shawn Still (incumbent)	36,580	47.12
Total votes		77,629	100.00
Democratic gain from Republican			

=== District 49 ===
The forty-ninth Senate district contains much of Hall County in Northeast Georgia.

Incumbent Republican Drew Echols was first elected unopposed in 2024.

District 49 general election
Party	Candidate	Votes	%
Republican	Drew Echols	50,090	66.56
Democratic	William Wallace	25,161	33.44
Total votes		75,251	100.00
Republican hold			

=== District 50 ===
The fiftieth Senate district is located in Northeast Georgia. The district contains contains all of Banks, Franklin, Habersham, Rabun, Stephens and Towns counties and parts of Hall, Jackson, and White counties.

Incumbent Bo Hatchett, a Republican first elected in 2020, was re-elected with 83.98% of the vote in 2024.

District 50 general election
Party	Candidate	Votes	%
Republican	Bo Hatchett (incumbent)	57,897	78.31
Democratic	Dave Cooper	16,033	21.69
Total votes		73,930	100.00
Republican hold			

=== District 51 ===
The fifty-first Senate district is located in the North Georgia Mountains. The district contains contains all of Dawson, Fannin, Gilmer, Lumpkin, Pickens, White and Union counties and part of White County.

Incumbent Republican Steve Gooch, who was first elected in 2010, retired to run for Lieutenant Governor.

51st district Republican primary
Party	Candidate	Votes	%
Republican	Will Wade	15,581	42.67
Republican	Philip Milam	15,015	41.12
Republican	Steve Shaw	5,915	16.20
Total votes		36,511	100.0

51st district Republican primary runoff
Party	Candidate	Votes	%
Republican	Will Wade	18,265	61.20
Republican	Philip Milam	11,579	38.80
Total votes		29,844	100.0

District 51 general election
Party	Candidate	Votes	%
Republican	Will Wade	70,190	79.08
Democratic	Gary St. Lawrence	18,573	20.92
Total votes		88,763	100.00
Republican hold			

=== District 52 ===
The fifty-second Senate district is located in Northwest Georgia. It contains parts of Bartow, Floyd and Gordon counties.

Incumbent Chuck Hufstetler, a Republican first elected in 2012, was re-elected unopposed in 2024.

District 52 general election
Party	Candidate	Votes	%
Republican	Chuck Hufstetler (incumbent)	55,687	100.00
Total votes		55,687	100.00
Republican hold			

=== District 53 ===
The fifty-third Senate district is located in Northwest Georgia. It contains all Catoosa County, Chattooga County, Dade County and Walker County, as well as parts of Floyd County.

Incumbent Colton Moore, who was first elected in 2022, resigned to run for a special election to the U.S. House of Representatives. He was replaced by Lanny Thomas in the special election.

53rd district Republican primary
Party	Candidate	Votes	%
Republican	Lanny Thomas (incumbent)	15,515	72.54
Republican	Denise Burns	3,166	14.80
Republican	Blake Elsberry	2,708	12.66
Total votes		21,389	100.0

District 53 general election
Party	Candidate	Votes	%
Republican	Lanny Thomas (incumbent)	45,648	73.93
Democratic	John Zibluck	16,101	26.07
Total votes		61,749	100.00
Republican hold			

=== District 54 ===
The fifty-fourth Senate district is located in Northwest Georgia. It contains all of Murray and Whitfield and part of Gordon counties.

Incumbent Chuck Payne, a Republican first elected in 2016, was re-elected unopposed in 2024.

54th district Republican primary
Party	Candidate	Votes	%
Republican	Chuck Payne (incumbent)	11,591	62.07
Republican	Eddie Hall	4,098	21.95
Republican	Marty Brown	2,984	15.98
Total votes		18,673	100.0

District 54 general election
Party	Candidate	Votes	%
Republican	Chuck Payne (incumbent)	45,754	100.00
Total votes		45,754	100.00
Republican hold			

=== District 55 ===
The fifty-fifth Senate district is located in DeKalb and Gwinnett counties in eastern Metro Atlanta.

Incumbent Randal Mangham, a Democrat, was first elected with 75.97% of the vote in 2024.

District 55 general election
Party	Candidate	Votes	%
Democratic	Randal Mangham (incumbent)	66,267	83.44
Republican	Mary Benefield	13,152	16.56
Total votes		79,419	100.00
Democratic hold			

=== District 56 ===
The fifty-sixth Senate district is located in Metro Atlanta. It contains parts of Fulton, Cobb and Cherokee counties.

Incumbent John Albers, a Republican first elected in 2010, was re-elected with 61.23% of the vote in 2024.

District 56 general election
Party	Candidate	Votes	%
Republican	John Albers (incumbent)	52,410	53.97
Democratic	Patrick Thompson	44,704	46.03
Total votes		97,114	100.00
Republican hold			

== See also ==
- 2026 Georgia elections
  - U.S. Senate
  - U.S. House
  - Governor
  - Lieutenant Governor
