= 91st Georgia General Assembly =

The 91st Georgia General Assembly was elected to office in 1890. It became known as the "Farmers' Legislature" due to the role played by the Farmers' Alliance in the successful nomination of three-fourths of the senators and four-fifths of the representatives (as well as the governor, William J. Northen) through the Democratic primary.

It was criticized for a lack of action on taxation, the crop lien system, and the regulation of railroads and out-of-state corporations. As a result, the People's Party of Georgia was formed by many of the Farmers' Alliance-nominated members of the 91st Assembly.

== Senate ==
District	Member	Party
1		
2		
3		
4		
5		
6		
7		
8		
9		
10		
11		
12		
13		
14		
15		
16		
17		
18		
19		
20		
21		
22		
23		
24		
25		
26		
27		
28		
29		
30		
31		
32		
33		
34		
35		
36		
37		
38		
39		
40		
41		
42		
43		
44		
45		
46		
47		
48		
49		
50		
51		
52		
53		
54		

== See also ==
- List of Georgia state legislatures
