= 2016 Georgia State Senate election =

Political event in Georgia (U.S.)

- November 8, 2016

All 56 seats in the Georgia State Senate 28 (with Lt. Gov.) seats needed for a majority
	Majority party	Minority party
Leader	Butch Miller	Steve Henson
Party	Republican	Democratic
Leader's seat	49th	41st
Last election	38	18
Seats before	39	17
Seats after	38	18
Seat change	▼1	▲1
Popular vote	2,247,579	1,260,395
Percentage	64.08%	35.92%
Swing	▲14.05%	▼14.05%
- Results: Democratic gain Republican hold Democratic hold
President pro tempore before election
Butch Miller
Republican
Elected President pro tempore
Butch Miller
Republican

The 2016 Georgia State Senate election was held on November 8, 2016. Georgia voters elected state senators in all 56 of the state senate's districts to the 154th Georgia General Assembly for two-year terms in the Georgia State Senate. The elections coincided with the 2016 United States presidential election, 2016 United States House of Representatives elections, 2016 Georgia House of Representatives election, and more.

== Predictions ==
Source	Ranking	As of
Governing	Safe R	May 18, 2016

== Results ==
Popular vote
Republican	57.58%
Democratic	42.26%
Other	0.16%

Senate seats
Republican	64.0%
Democratic	36.0%

Affiliation	Candidates	Votes	Vote %	Seats won
Republican	42	2,247,579	64.07%	38 (▼1)
Democratic	27	1,260,395	35.93%	18 (▲1)
Total	69	3,507,974	100%	56

== Detailed results by district ==
2016 election results:

District	Democratic		Republican		Others		Total	Result
District	Votes	%	Votes	%	Votes	%	Votes	Result
District 1	-	-	59,151	100.00%	-	-	59,151	Republican hold
District 2	54,264	100.00%	-	-	-	-	54,264	Democratic hold
District 3	-	-	53,872	100.00%	-	-	53,872	Republican hold
District 4	-	-	54,539	100.00%	-	-	54,539	Republican hold
District 5	35,586	100.00%	-	-	-	-	35,586	Democratic hold
District 6	39,201	48.08%	42,338	51.92%	-	-	81,539	Republican hold
District 7	-	-	48,481	100.00%	-	-	48,481	Republican hold
District 8	20,661	51.92%	37,237	49.18%	-	-	57,898	Republican hold
District 9	-	-	65,094	100.00%	-	-	65,094	Republican hold
District 10	-	-	70,764	100.00%	-	-	70,764	Democratic hold
District 11	-	-	49,068	100.00%	-	-	49,068	Republican hold
District 12	48,863	100.00%	-	-	-	-	48,863	Democratic hold
District 13	16,853	27.91%	43,534	72.09%	-	-	60,387	Republican hold
District 14	-	-	63,251	100.00%	-	-	63,251	Republican hold
District 15	44,076	100.00%	-	-	-	-	44,076	Democratic hold
District 16	-	-	66,383	100.00%	-	-	66,383	Republican hold
District 17	32,772	40.35%	48,444	59.65%	-	-	81,216	Republican hold
District 18	-	-	60,751	100.00%	-	-	60,751	Republican hold
District 19	-	-	43,329	100.00%	-	-	43,329	Republican hold
District 20	-	-	60,774	100.00%	-	-	60,774	Republican hold
District 21	-	-	78,154	100.00%	-	-	78,154	Republican hold
District 22	52,532	100.00%	-	-	-	-	52,532	Democratic hold
District 23	-	-	52,831	100.00%	-	-	52,831	Republican hold
District 24	52,831	68.64%	25,988	31.36%	-	-	78,819	Republican hold
District 25	-	-	60,036	100.00%	-	-	60,036	Republican hold
District 26	47,812	100.00%	-	-	-	-	47,812	Democratic hold
District 27	20,153	21.54%	73,417	78.46%	-	-	93,570	Republican hold
District 28	-	-	68,100	100.00%	-	-	68,100	Republican hold
District 29	26,282	35.74%	47,258	64.26%	-	-	73,540	Republican hold
District 30	-	-	58,574	100.00%	-	-	58,574	Republican hold
District 31	-	-	60,268	100.00%	-	-	60,268	Republican hold
District 32	-	-	78,117	100.00%	-	-	78,117	Republican hold
District 33	52,902	100.00%	-	-	-	-	52,902	Democratic hold
District 34	53,434	100.00%	-	-	-	-	53,434	Democratic hold
District 35	66,099	100.00%	-	-	-	-	66,099	Democratic hold
District 36	66,698	100.00%	-	-	-	-	66,698	Democratic hold
District 37	-	-	70,588	100.00%	-	-	70,588	Republican hold
District 38	59,542	78.54%	16,265	21.46%	-	-	75,807	Democratic hold
District 39	67,041	100.00%	-	-	-	-	67,041	Democratic hold
District 40	32,785	43.81%	42,050	56.19%	-	-	15,578	Republican hold
District 41	52,579	100.00%	-	-	-	-	52,579	Democratic hold
District 42	62,146	76.88%	18,687	23.12%	-	-	80,833	Democratic hold
District 43	50,436	70.43%	21,175	29.57%	-	-	71,611	Democratic gain
District 44	66,050	100.00%	-	-	-	-	66,050	Democratic hold
District 45	-	-	64,059	100.00%	-	-	64,059	Republican hold
District 46	-	-	62,565	100.00%	-	-	62,565	Republican hold
District 47	-	-	57,837	100.00%	-	-	57,837	Republican hold
District 48	-	-	51,546	100.00%	-	-	51,546	Republican hold
District 49	-	-	59,242	100.00%	-	-	59,242	Republican hold
District 50	-	-	61,180	100.00%	-	-	61,180	Republican hold
District 51	-	-	70,737	100.00%	-	-	15,578	Republican hold
District 52	-	-	52,820	100.00%	-	-	52,820	Republican hold
District 53	-	-	55,148	100.00%	-	-	55,148	Republican hold
District 54	-	-	46,908	100.00%	-	-	46,908	Republican hold
District 55	61,907	77.78%	17,686	22.22%	-	-	79,593	Democratic hold
District 56	32,969	40.12%	49,202	32,969%	-	-	82,171	Republican hold

== See also ==
- United States elections, 2016
- United States House of Representatives elections in Georgia, 2016
- Georgia elections, 2016
- List of Georgia state legislatures
