= Larry Johnson (Georgia politician) =

American politician

Member of the Georgia Senate from the 10th district
- Member-elect
- Assumed office January 11, 2027
- Preceded by: Emanuel Jones

Personal details
- Party: Democratic
- Website: Official website

Larry Johnson is an American politician who is a member-elect of the Georgia State Senate, representing the 10th district. He was elected to the Georgia State Senate, in the general election on November 3, 2026. He was previously a DeKalb County Commissioner. He is a member of the Iota Phi Theta fraternity.
