= Scott Tippetts =

American politician

Member of the Georgia Senate from the 45th district
- Member-elect
- Assumed office January 11, 2027
- Preceded by: Clint Dixon

Personal details
- Party: Democratic
- Education: Brigham Young University
- Website: Official website

Anthony "Scott" Tippetts is an American politician who is a member-elect of the Georgia State Senate, representing the 45th district. He was elected to the Georgia State Senate, in the general election on November 3, 2026. Tippetts is a research scientist.
