= Laura Murvartian =

American politician

Member of the Georgia Senate from the 48th district
- Member-elect
- Assumed office January 11, 2027
- Preceded by: Shawn Still

Personal details
- Party: Democratic
- Education: University of Michigan
- Website: Official website

Laura Murvartian is an American politician who is a member-elect of the Georgia State Senate, representing the 48th district. She was elected to the Georgia State Senate, in the general election on November 3, 2026. She unseated incumbent Republican Shawn Still. Her paternal grandfather was a survivor of the Armenian genocide. At age 8, she moved to Minnesota from Mexico. She was a candidate for House District 48 at the 2024 election.
