= Darcy Castro =

American politician

Member of the Georgia Senate from the 37th district
- Member-elect
- Assumed office January 11, 2027
- Preceded by: Ed Setzler

Personal details
- Party: Democratic
- Education: Portland State University
- Website: Official website

Darcy Castro is an American politician who is a member-elect of the Georgia State Senate, representing the 37th district. She was elected to the Georgia State Senate, in the general election on November 3, 2026. She unseated incumbent Republican Ed Setzler. She is based in Cobb County, Georgia.
