= Edward Brown (Georgia politician) =

American politician from Georgia

Member-elect of the Georgia State Senate from the 12th district
- Assuming office TBD
- Succeeding: Freddie Powell Sims

Personal details
- Born: Georgia, U.S.
- Party: Democratic
- Education: University of Alabama (BS); Southern Methodist University (MA); Brown University (MPP); University of Cambridge (MPhil, PhD)

Edward Brown is an American economist and politician who is the member-elect for the 12th district in the Georgia State Senate.

== Early life and career ==
Brown was born in Georgia. He graduated from the University of Alabama with a Bachelor of Science in finance and accounting, then worked as an equities research analyst at Morgan Stanley and technical analyst at Oppenheimer & Company. He also graduated from Southern Methodist University with a Master of Arts in economics and a Master of Public Policy in economic policy from Brown University. He then worked as a policy associate at center-right think tank the American Enterprise Institute in Washington, D.C. before joining the U.S. Department of Labor as an economist at the Bureau of Labor Statistics for four years. Brown then moved to England to earn a Master of Philosophy and Doctor of Philosophy in economic and social history from the University of Cambridge.

== Georgia State Senate ==
Brown ran for the Georgia State Senate in the 12th district in 2026. Incumbent senator Freddie Powell Sims, who retired, endorsed his campaign.
