= David Sikes =

American politician

Member of the Georgia Senate from the 19th district
- Member-elect
- Assumed office January 11, 2027
- Preceded by: Blake Tillery

Personal details
- Party: Republican
- Website: Official website

David Sikes is an American politician who is a member-elect of the Georgia State Senate, representing the 19th district. He was elected to the Georgia State Senate, in the general election on November 3, 2026. He was previously chair of the Toombs County Commissioners.
