= Jason Dickerson =

American politician

Jason T. Dickerson

Member of the Georgia State Senate from the 21st district
- Incumbent
- Assumed office October 14, 2025
- Preceded by: Brandon Beach

Personal details
- Born: July 7, 1976 (age 50) Canton, Georgia
- Party: Republican
- Website: www.dickersonforgeorgia.com

Jason T. Dickerson is an American businessman, investor, philanthropist, and Republican politician serving as a member of the Georgia State Senate for the 21st district. He was elected to the Senate in a 2025 Special Election following the appointment of incumbent Senator Brandon Beach as Treasurer of the United States. The district includes parts of Cherokee and Fulton County in the Metro Atlanta region.

Before entering politics, Dickerson co-founded and led the transportation company Quest Global, Inc., commonly known as Quest Trucking, and later founded Purple Chip Capital Management, a private investment firm. He also serves as chairman of the Jason T. Dickerson Family Foundation, a private charitable foundation based in Cherokee County.

== Early Life and Personal Life ==
Dickerson is a lifelong resident of Cherokee County, Georgia, and grew up on his family's farm in the Union Hill community. His father served in the United States Army during the Vietnam War, and his grandfather served during World War II in North Africa and Italy. Dickerson has cited his family's military service and his upbringing as influences on his interest in public and community service.

Dickerson began his first business at age 15 and later pursued a career in the transportation industry.

Dickerson is a Rotary Paul Harris Fellow and has been a member of the National Rifle Association, Sons of the American Legion, and National Skeet Shooting Association. He previously served on the board of the Cherokee County Educational Foundation.

Dickerson and his wife, Carey, reside in Canton and attend Canton First Methodist Church.

== Business Career ==
At age 24, Dickerson co-founded Quest Global, Inc., commonly known as Quest Trucking, a transportation company specializing in expedited long-haul transportation of refrigerated and hazardous-material freight. The company primarily served Fortune 500 customers and developed a niche in expedited coast-to-coast transportation, including freight scheduled for delivery within 48 hours.

Under Dickerson's leadership, Quest grew to more than 275 trucks, 550 trailers, and approximately 500 employees at its peak. The company emphasized customer service, expedited delivery, technology, fuel efficiency, and the use of aerodynamic equipment in its trucking operations.

Quest also became known for military-themed tractor-trailers honoring American veterans. The company participated in Wreaths Across America, transporting wreaths at no charge to military cemeteries across the United States, including Georgia National Cemetery in Canton.

Quest was sold in 2022 to KLLM Transport Services for an undisclosed amount.

Dickerson later founded Purple Chip Capital Management, a private investment management firm focused on value investing and identifying undervalued publicly traded companies in the United States.

== Philanthropy ==
In 2018, Dickerson and his family established the Jason T. Dickerson Family Foundation, a private 501(c)(3) charitable foundation based in Cherokee County. Dickerson serves as chairman of the foundation without compensation.

The foundation supports programs benefiting veterans, senior citizens, animal welfare, education, foster children, first responders, and other charitable causes. Its programs have included rent and utility assistance for senior citizens in financial need; temporary and permanent housing assistance, food, clothing, and home repairs for veterans and homeless veterans; and support for organizations providing shelter, food, and medical care to abused and neglected animals.

Education is also a significant area of the foundation's charitable activity. The foundation provides scholarships to Cherokee County School District students and funds grants for teachers and classrooms through the Cherokee County Educational Foundation. Its programs have included $25,000 college scholarships for Cherokee County students pursuing veterinary medicine and grants providing classroom supplies to newly hired teachers.

In October of 2026, Georgia Life Alliance Committee announced an unprecedented six-figure education program ahead of the 2026 General Election to raise awareness about policies affecting safety and affordability for mothers, babies, and families. The effort would target tens of thousands of low-propensity voters in several key legislative districts. They noted that Dickerson was the primary benefactor, making one of the largest single donations in GLAC's history.

== 2025 State Senate Special Election ==
Following State Senator Brandon Beach's appointment as Treasurer of the United States, Dickerson announced his candidacy in the 2025 special election to fill the remainder of Beach's term representing Georgia's 21st Senate District.

In the initial Special Election, Dickerson finished second in a seven-candidate field with 17.4% of the vote, advancing to a Runoff against Democrat Debra Shigley, who finished first with approximately 40% of the vote.

Dickerson chose to self-fund his campaign and pledged not to accept campaign contributions from individuals, lobbyists, political action committees, or other outside interests. Campaign finance reports showed that he had loaned his campaign $500,000 by the initial election and approximately $750,000 by the runoff.

The runoff attracted attention outside the district as Democratic organizations and political figures sought to win the traditionally Republican seat. Democratic National Committee chair Ken Martin and Georgia political figures including Stacey Abrams, Lucy McBath, Geoff Duncan, and Jason Esteves campaigned for or supported Shigley.

Dickerson won the runoff with approximately 61% of the vote to Shigley's 39%. He was sworn into the Georgia State Senate on October 14, 2025.

== State Senate ==
=== Committee Assignments ===
Following his election, Dickerson was appointed secretary of the Senate Committee on Banking and Financial Institutions. He was also appointed to the Senate Committees on Natural Resources and the Environment, Public Safety, and Veterans, Military and Homeland Security, and appointed ex officio to the Government Oversight and Transportation committees.

=== 2026 Legislative Session ===
During his first legislative session, Dickerson introduced or carried legislation addressing property taxes, school attendance, commercial driver's licenses, veterans' housing, food production, transportation, and other issues.

On the first day of the 2026 legislative session, Dickerson introduced legislation fulfilling a campaign pledge to limit annual increases in education property tax assessments in Cherokee County without allowing local governments to opt out of the limitation. The measure passed the General Assembly and was signed by Governor Brian Kemp, placing the proposal before Cherokee County voters for ratification in the November 2026 election.

Dickerson also carried legislation addressing chronic absenteeism among Georgia students. The legislation established a system of interventions for students with repeated absences, including attendance review teams, individualized attendance plans, periodic reviews, and consequences for continued chronic unexcused absences.

He introduced legislation addressing commercial driver's licenses issued to noncitizens, including provisions relating to lawful-presence requirements, license expiration and revocation, and compliance with federal commercial driver's license standards.

Dickerson also introduced the Housing for Heroes Act, legislation intended to modify income requirements affecting housing assistance eligibility for disabled veterans, and legislation addressing the production and sale of laboratory-grown meat.

He sponsored a resolution designating a portion of Georgia State Route 9 in north Fulton County as the United States Treasurer Brandon L. Beach Highway, honoring his predecessor in the State Senate.

During his first session, Dickerson also regularly delivered points of personal privilege on the Senate floor recognizing constituents, community leaders, and notable Americans, including figures recognized in connection with Black History Month and Women's History Month.

== Political Approach ==
Dickerson has described his legislative approach as focused on practical or "common-sense" legislation addressing issues affecting people's everyday lives rather than partisan political disputes. He has emphasized household finances and the ability of families to afford basic goods and services, along with property taxes, transportation, education, veterans, and government efficiency.

Drawing on his business background, Dickerson has also emphasized defined government timelines, transparency, accountability, and reducing unnecessary administrative requirements affecting individuals and businesses.

== Campaign Finance & Political Activity ==
Dickerson pledged during his 2025 State Senate campaign not to accept campaign contributions from the public, lobbyists, political action committees, or other outside interests, choosing instead to finance his campaign personally.

He continued the policy after taking office. According to campaign finance disclosures filed in July 2026, contributions received by the campaign had been returned to the donors, and Dickerson had reported approximately $1.5 million in personal loans to his campaign.

During the 2026 Republican primary runoff for Lieutenant Governor, Dickerson was the only member of the Georgia State Senate to formally endorse State Senator Greg Dolezal over former Senate President Pro Tempore John F. Kennedy. Other senators who formally endorsed a candidate in the runoff supported Kennedy. Senator Chuck Hufstetler publicly stated that he intended to vote for Dolezal but did not formally endorse him.

Dolezal subsequently defeated Kennedy in the Republican runoff and became the Republican nominee for lieutenant governor in the November 2026 general election.

Following Dolezal's victory in the Republican primary, Dickerson contributed $100,000 to Dolezal's Leadership Committee. According to Georgia campaign finance disclosures, the contribution made Dickerson the largest donor to Dolezal's Leadership Committee.

During the 2026 Republican primary and runoff elections, Dickerson also endorsed Mike Collins for the United States Senate, Tim Fleming for Georgia Secretary of State, Jack Miller for Georgia House District 47, and Hayden Holcomb for Cherokee County School Board District 6. Each subsequently won their respective Republican Runoff Election.

== Electoral history ==
2026 Georgia State Senate 21st District Republican Primary
| Party | Candidate | Votes | % |
|---|---|---|---|
| Republican | Jason T. Dickerson | 24,384 | 100.00 |
| Total votes | | 24,384 | 100.00 |

2025 Georgia State Senate 21st District Special Election Runoff
| Party | Candidate | Votes | % |
|---|---|---|---|
| Republican | Jason T. Dickerson | 19,065 | 61.46 |
| Democratic | Debra Shigley | 11,955 | 38.54 |
| Total votes | | 31,020 | 100.00 |
| Republican hold | | | |

2025 Georgia State Senate 21st District Special Election
| Party | Candidate | Votes | % |
|---|---|---|---|
| Democratic | Debra Shigley | 8,444 | 39.52 |
| Republican | Jason T. Dickerson | 3,709 | 17.36 |
| Republican | Steve West | 3,642 | 17.04 |
| Republican | Brian Will | 2,192 | 10.26 |
| Republican | Brice Futch | 1,749 | 8.19 |
| Republican | Lance Calvert | 1,424 | 6.66 |
| Republican | Stephanie Donegan | 207 | 0.97 |
| Total votes | | 21,367 | 100.0 |
