= David Shafer (politician) =

American politician (born 1965)

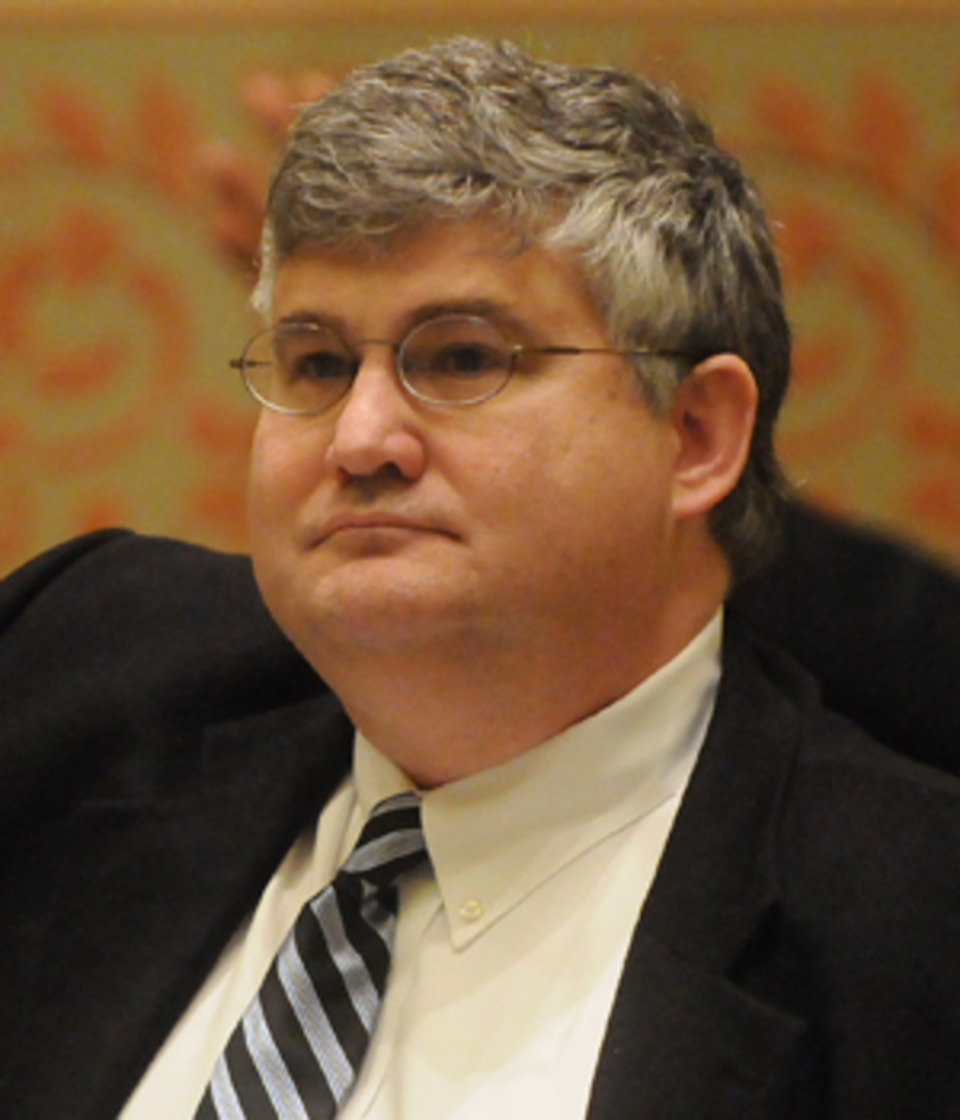

Chair of the Georgia Republican Party
- In office May 18, 2019 – June 10, 2023
- Preceded by: John Watson
- Succeeded by: Joshua McKoon

President pro tempore of the Georgia State Senate
- In office January 14, 2013 – January 8, 2018
- Preceded by: Tommie Williams
- Succeeded by: Butch Miller

Member of the Georgia State Senate from the 48th district
- In office February 12, 2002 – January 14, 2019
- Preceded by: William M. Ray II
- Succeeded by: Zahra Karinshak

Personal details
- Born: April 29, 1965 (age 61) Dunwoody, Georgia, U.S.
- Party: Republican
- Spouse: Lee Shafer
- Education: University of Georgia (BA)
- Website: Campaign website

David James Shafer (born April 29, 1965) is an American politician who served as President Pro Tempore of the Georgia State Senate and State Chairman of the Georgia Republican Party.

From 2002 to 2019, Shafer was a Republican member of the Georgia State Senate from Senate District 48, a suburban district located north of Atlanta that includes portions of Fulton County and Gwinnett County. He was elected the 69th President Pro Tempore of the State Senate in 2013 and re-eleccted twice.

Shafer was a Republican candidate for Lieutenant Governor in 2018, placing first in a three way Republican primary but narrowly losing in the primary runoff election to Geoff Duncan.

Shafer was elected Chairman of the Georgia Republican Party at the party's state convention on May 18, 2019, winning a four way race on the first ballot. He was re-elected in 2021 and then designated "Chairman Emeritus" by unanimous vote at the conclusion of his second term in 2023.

On August 14, 2023, he was indicted along with President Donald J. Trump and 17 other people in the prosecution brought by Fulton District Attorney Fani Willis related to the 2020 election in Georgia. Following the disqualification of Willis for misconduct, Shafer was exonerated by the nonpartisan Prosecuting Attorneys Council of Georgia. The charges against him were dismissed and expunged. Shafer's attorney called the prosecution "the most disturbing abuse of prosecutorial discretion" that he had observed in nearly 40 years of practicing law.

== Early life and education ==
Born in Pennsylvania, Shafer was raised in Dunwoody, a suburb of Atlanta in DeKalb County. He was educated in DeKalb County Public Schools. He graduated from Peachtree High School. He attended the University of Georgia, graduating with a degree in political science. He was an academic intern in the Washington, D.C., office of United States Senator Sam Nunn.

== Political career ==
Early political career

From 1989 to 1990, Shafer was the campaign manager for Billy Lovett's race for Georgia Insurance Commissioner. He was executive director of the Georgia Republican Party in the early 1990s. He resigned to manage the 1994 gubernatorial campaign of Republican businessman Guy Millner, who narrowly lost the general election to Governor Zell Miller.

Shafer ran for secretary of state himself in 1996, winning a hotly contested Republican primary in the race to succeed Max Cleland but losing the general election to Democrat Lewis Massey, who had been appointed to succeed Cleland by Miller. Shafer ran for State Chairman of the Georgia Republican Party in 2001, placing second in a three-way race ultimately won by Christian conservative activist Ralph Reed.

=== State Senate ===
Shafer was first elected to the state senate in a nonpartisan special election on February 12, 2002, defeating three other candidates in a race to succeed Senator Billy Ray, who had resigned from the Senate to accept a judicial appointment to the Superior Court. Shafer caucused with the Republican Party. Shafer was re-elected in the 2002, 2004, 2006, 2008, 2010, 2012, 2014 and 2016 general elections as a Republican. Shafer never faced opposition for reelection.

Shafer was elected to serve as the 68th President Pro Tempore of the Georgia State Senate on January 14, 2013. He was re-elected twice but resigned from the post in early in 2018 to run for lieutenant governor.

Shafer was one of the organizers of the Republican Liberty Caucus in Georgia and was named its honorary chairman.

=== Exploratory campaign for Lieutenant Governor ===
In late 2008, after incumbent Lieutenant Governor Casey Cagle announced that he would be running for Governor in 2010, Shafer formed an exploratory committee to run for Lieutenant Governor. After Cagle announced that a debilitating spinal disease was forcing him to withdraw from the race for governor and instead seek re-election as Lieutenant Governor, Shafer announced that he was suspending his campaign, subject to Cagle's full medical recovery, and that he would instead seek re-election to the State Senate. He was re-elected in 2010 at the same time that Cagle won re-election as Lieutenant Governor.

=== Campaign for Lieutenant Governor ===
When Lieutenant Governor Casey Cagle again announced that he would be running for governor in 2018, Shafer resumed his campaign for Lieutenant Governor. He quickly emerged as the front runner, winning Republican straw polls and receiving endorsements from major conservative organizations and political figures. He placed first in a three way Republican primary, receiving 49% of the vote. Because he received less than 50% of the vote, he proceeded to a runoff with the second-place candidate, state Representative Geoff Duncan.

In March 2018, the day after he filed papers qualifying to run for lieutenant governor, an unidentified lobbyist filed a complaint accusing Shafer of sexually harassing comments seven years earlier. Shafer denied the allegations, calling then "false and ridiculous" and saying that the accuser was a woman he had dated in the 1990s prior to his election to the Senate and that he had never been alone with her after his election as a state senator in 2002, producing affidavits from his staff saying he had instructed them never to schedule events with her or allow her to meet with him alone in his office. The Senate Ethics Committee retained independent counsel to investigate the complaint. The independent counsel found that "it is more likely that Sen. Shafer did not make sexually harassing comments and demands to (the lobbyist) than it is likely that he did, and that it is more likely that the (lobbyist) has fabricated her allegations of sexually harassing conduct than it is likely that she is telling the truth." The report stated that the lobbyist changed her story during the investigation, acknowledging that she had never been alone with Shafer but claiming the alleged harassment was by telephone. The lobbyist produced no records of the alleged harassing calls but Shafer produced telephone records for a five-year period showing that the alleged calls had not taken place. The ethics panel dismissed the complaint, stating that "no evidence" had been uncovered to corroborate the complaint and that the evidence uncovered had "contradicted the essential elements of the complaint."

Shafer narrowly lost the runoff, receiving 49.9% of the vote to Duncan's 50.1%.

=== Georgia Republican Party chairmanship ===
On May 18, 2019, Shafer was elected Chairman of the Georgia Republican Party at the party's state convention in Savannah. He was re-elected on June 5, 2021 at the party's state convention on Jekyll Island. Shafer did not seek a third term as State Chairman, endorsing Joshua McKoon who was elected to succeed him on June 10, 2023.

Delegate unanimously Shafer elected "Chairman Emeritus" of the Georgia Republican Party in a resolution that credited him with "rescuing(ing) the Georgia Republican Party from a half-decade of borderline insolvency by imposing fiscal discipline, retiring debt and setting fundraising records" among other accomplishments.

In 2021, Shafer was involved in efforts to advance Georgia's controversial voting reform bill, Senate Bill 202, which was ultimately signed into law by Governor Brian Kemp.

Attempts to overturn the 2020 U.S. presidential election

Shafer's booking photograph released by the Fulton County, Georgia, sheriff's office

After the 2020 presidential election, the Georgia Republican Party under Shafer, along with the Donald Trump campaign, filed a lawsuit contesting the certification of the results of Georgia's presidential election results (which was won by Democratic candidate Joe Biden). Trump and his allies made false claims of fraud in the election. Shafer spread misinformation about the vote-counting process in Georgia.

On December 14, 2020, Shafer, describing himself as "Chairman" and "Chairperson" of the "Electoral College of Georgia", submitted 16 fraudulent Electoral College votes to the U.S. Senate and the National Archives. He was issued a subpoena to testify before the United States House Select Committee on the January 6 Attack and did so on February 25, 2022. He reportedly told the committee that the Trump campaign had directed the Georgia GOP to submit the slate of false electors.

When an audio recording of Trump pressuring Georgia Secretary of State Brad Raffensperger to overturn the Georgia election results and to "find" votes for Trump was released in January 2021, Shafer's response was to condemn Raffensperger for releasing the audio. Shafer said Raffensperger's action was "lawlessness." Shafer also made false claims about the contents of the call. On June 22, 2022, the U.S. Department of Justice subpoenaed Shafer in connection with his alleged role in organizing an unofficial slate of electors from Georgia after the 2020 election.

In July, 2022, Fulton County prosecutor Fani Willis announced that she had sent a target letter to Shafer and two other Republican officials, warning them that they face indictment in connection with the fake electors scheme, which was part of the attempts to overturn the 2020 United States presidential election.

According to Shafer's attorneys, he was merely following the "repeated and detailed advice of [Donald Trump's] legal counsel" who gave him "very direct, detailed legal advice on the procedure he should follow, and he followed those instructions to the letter" in his actions concerning the 2020 election and the effort to put forward an alternative slate of electors.

On August 14, 2023, Shafer, along with 18 other defendants, was indicted by a grand jury in Fulton County in connection with racketeering charges related to the attempt to overturn the results of Georgia's 2020 presidential election.

On November 9, 2025, Shafer and others convicted for attempts to overturn the results of the 2020 election, were pardoned by Donald Trump.

== Personal life ==
Shafer is married and lives in Duluth, Georgia, with his family. He is a former director of the Gwinnett Chamber of Commerce and a former trustee of the Gwinnett County Library System. He is a Presbyterian and a Rotarian.

== See also ==
- 152nd Georgia General Assembly
- List of alleged Georgia election racketeers

Georgia State Senate
Preceded by William M. Ray II	Member of the Georgia State Senate from the 48th district 2002–2019	Succeeded by Zahra Karinshak
Preceded by Tommie Williams	President pro tempore of the Georgia Senate; 2013–2018	Succeeded by Butch Miller
Party political offices
Preceded by Keith Mahoney	Republican nominee for Secretary of State of Georgia; 1996	Succeeded by John A. McCallum
Preceded by John Watson	Chair of the Georgia Republican Party; 2019–2023	Succeeded by Joshua McKoon
