= Shawn Still =

Republican Georgia State Senator from the 48th district

Member of the Georgia State Senate from the 48th district
- Incumbent
- Assumed office January 9, 2023
- Preceded by: Michelle Au
- Succeeded by: Laura Murvartian

Personal details
- Born: 1972 or 1973 (age 53–54) Jacksonville, Florida
- Party: Republican
- Education: University of Alabama
- Website: shawnstill.com

Shawn Micah Tresher Still is an American businessman and politician who has represented the 48th district in the Georgia Senate since 2023. He is a member of the Republican Party. He was indicted and exonerated along with former President Trump and 17 others for interfering in the 2020 presidential election in Georgia.

== Career ==
Still was born and raised in Jacksonville, Florida. He received a bachelor's degree in communications from the University of Alabama. He became the sole owner of a swimming pool construction business, originally founded by his cousin, in 2015. The business employs over 100 people in Gwinnett County. Still is also the owner of a rafting company based in Bryson City, North Carolina.

Still is a member of the Republican Party. He was elected to the 48th district in the 2022 Georgia State Senate election, in which he defeated Democrat Josh Uddin. After the most recent round of redistricting, the 48th district contains part of southern Forsyth County, as well as parts of Fulton and Gwinnett counties. Prior to being elected to the Georgia Senate, Still served as finance chairman for the Georgia Republican Party.

In January 2024, Still co-sponsored S.B. 390, which would withhold government funding for any libraries in Georgia affiliated with the American Library Association. The bill was drafted following the election of ALA President Emily Drabinski and allegations of the organization promoting a personal ideology and influencing librarian certification.

In the 2024 general election, Still held his seat with over 53% of the vote against Ashwin Ramaswami, the Democratic candidate. He lost re-election in 2026 to Democrat Laura Murvartian.

=== Fake electors ===
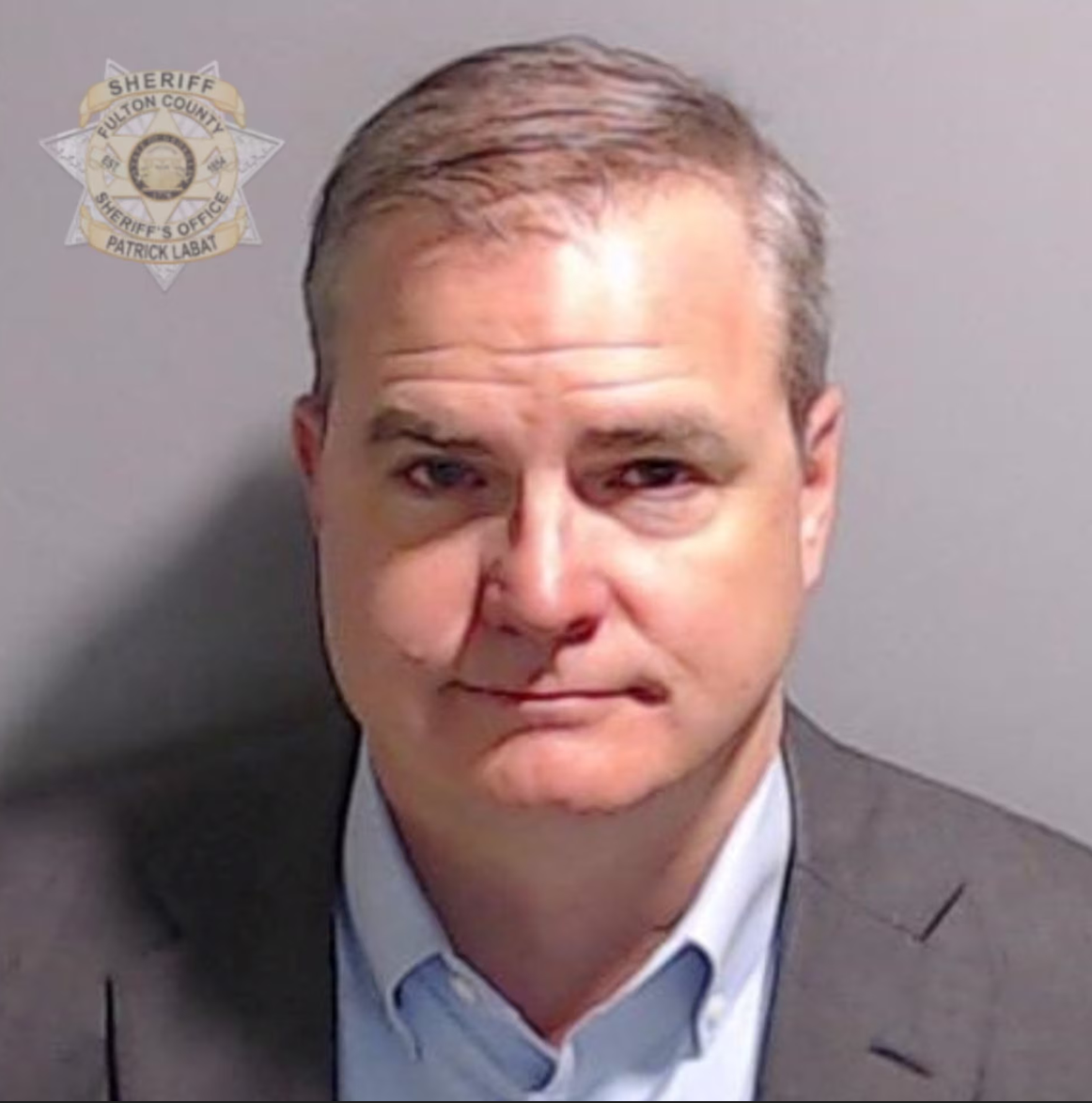
Still's booking photograph released by the Fulton County, Georgia, sheriff's office

Still was one of the fake electors who participated in the Trump fake electors plot after the 2020 United States presidential election, which aimed to award Georgia's electoral votes to Donald Trump after he lost the state of Georgia to Joe Biden.

He was one of 14 people, and one of two people from Georgia, who were subpoenaed by the January 6th Committee in January 2022 for their involvement in the alternate electors scheme. On August 14, 2023, Still was indicted in the prosecution related to the 2020 election in Georgia for allegedly violating Georgia's RICO Act, impersonating a public officer, forgery, false statements and writings, and other charges. Like all other defendants charged in the case, Still pleaded not guilty upon being arrested. In September of that year, a three-person panel recommended not to temporarily remove Still from office as he awaits trial.

== See also ==
- List of alleged Georgia election racketeers
