= Marc McMain =

American politician

Member of the Georgia Senate from the 46th district
- Member-elect
- Assumed office January 11, 2027
- Preceded by: Bill Cowsert

Personal details
- Party: Republican
- Website: Official website

Marc McMain is an American politician who is a member-elect of the Georgia State Senate, representing the 46th district. He was elected to the Georgia State Senate, in the general election on November 3, 2026. He is the owner of Town Values magazine. He is a former chair of the Walton County Republican Party.
