= Eric Lee (politician) =

American politician

Member of the Georgia Senate from the 42nd district
- Member-elect
- Assumed office January 11, 2027
- Preceded by: Brian Strickland

Personal details
- Party: Democratic
- Education: Morehouse College; Vanderbilt University
- Website: Official website

Eric Wendel Lee Sr is an American politician who is a member-elect of the Georgia State Senate, representing the 42nd district. He was elected to the Georgia State Senate, in the general election on November 3, 2026. Lee is a community advocate from the Atlanta area. He has been senior pastor of Springfield Baptist Church since 1999.
