= Nabilah Parkes =

American politician (born 1989)

- Official portrait, 2023

Member of the Georgia State Senate from the 7th district
- In office January 9, 2023 – March 13, 2026
- Preceded by: Tyler Harper
- Succeeded by: Adrienne White

Personal details
- Born: Nabilah Aishah Islam; November 27, 1989 (age 36) Atlanta, Georgia, U.S.
- Party: Democratic
- Education: Georgia State University (BBA)

Nabilah Aishah Parkes (née Islam; born November 27, 1989) is an American activist and politician from the state of Georgia who served as the Georgia state senator for the 7th district from 2023 to 2026. She became the first Muslim woman in the Georgia State Senate. She previously ran to represent Georgia's 7th congressional district in 2020.

== Early life and education ==
Parkes was born Nabilah Islam in the United States to parents from Bangladesh and grew up in Norcross and Lawrenceville. Her father worked as a file clerk at the Internal Revenue Service and her mother, originally from Noakhali, worked various low-wage jobs, at one point as a cook at Hardee's and in a warehouse. An insurance company tried to deny health benefits to her mother after she took time off work due to a herniated disc, leading Parkes to become an advocate for expanded healthcare.

Parkes graduated from Central Gwinnett High School and Georgia State University with a BBA in marketing. She was a member of Alpha Xi Delta.

== Career ==
Parkes previously served as campaign manager for the first Atlanta City Council term of Andre Dickens, who was elected mayor of Atlanta in 2021. She also worked on the campaign of Jason Carter for Georgia governor and the presidential campaign of Hillary Clinton, and for the Democratic National Committee. She also served as senior advisor to the Gwinnett County Democratic Party in 2020. She re-chartered and served as President of the Gwinnett County Young Democrats in 2013.

=== 2020 congressional campaign ===
Parkes ran in the Democratic primary for Georgia's 7th congressional district in 2020. She was endorsed by U.S. Representatives Alexandria Ocasio-Cortez of New York, Ilhan Omar of Minnesota, and Ro Khanna of California. During the campaign, Parkes supported Medicare for All and a $15 federal minimum wage. She placed a close third with 12.3% of the vote.

Parkes struggled with paying rent, did not have healthcare, and put her student loan debt into forbearance during the campaign due to not being able to work full time. She filed a formal petition to the Federal Election Commission to allow candidates to use campaign contributions for a minimum salary and health benefits. She charged that current regulations barred working-class people from running for office and the petition was supported by Campaign Legal Center, Common Cause, and Issue One. In December 2023, the FEC approved the rule change in a 5–1 vote.

=== Member of the Georgia Senate (2023–2026) ===
==== 2022 campaign ====
With the backing of U.S. Representative Lucy McBath, Parkes entered the Democratic primary for the 7th district of the Georgia State Senate in 2022. The district, a new open seat, is entirely in Gwinnett County and leans towards Democrats. She was endorsed by Fair Fight Action, a voting rights organization founded by Georgia politician Stacey Abrams. She defeated State Representative Beth Moore in the primary with just over 50% of the vote and subsequently defeated Republican Josh McKay in the general election with roughly 53% of the vote.

Parkes represents Georgia's 7th Senate district encompassing Peachtree Corners, Berkeley Lake, Norcross, Duluth, Suwanee, and Lawrenceville in Gwinnett County.

She served on the Government Oversight Committee, the Veterans, Military and Homeland Security Committee, the State Institutions and Properties Committee and the Science and Technology Committee. She is also the vice-chair of the Gwinnett Senate legislative delegation. Parkes is a member of Georgia's Asian American and Pacific Islander Caucus and Hispanic Caucus, and a member of the Georgia Legislative Black Caucus and Working Families Caucus. She was recognized by Georgia Asian Times as one of the 25 most influential Asian Americans in Georgia.

==== Tenure ====
Following the 2023 Atlanta shooting, Parkes was among a group of four Democratic legislators to call for a special legislative session to address firearm safety.

In April 2024, Senate Bill 144, the first bill sponsored by Parkes that passed into law, was signed by the Governor Brian Kemp. The law, which arose from Parkes' service on the Senate Committee on Veterans, Military, and Homeland Security, will reduce administrative burdens on the state militia, save taxpayer dollars, and protect commissioned officers.

In January 2026, Parkes announced her campaign for Georgia insurance commissioner. She later withdrew from that race to instead run for lieutenant governor and resigned from the Georgia Senate in March 2026 to focus on that race. She lost the June 16 runoff election to State Senator Josh Mclaurin.

== Personal life ==
Parkes lives in Duluth with her husband Bryan, and is stepmother to two daughters. She is Muslim.

== Electoral history ==
2020 Georgia's 7th congressional district Democratic primary
Party	Candidate	Votes	%
Democratic	Carolyn Bourdeaux	44,710	52.8
Democratic	Brenda Lopez Romero	10,497	12.4
Democratic	Nabilah Islam	10,447	12.3
Democratic	Rashid Malik	6,780	8.0
Democratic	John Eaves	6,548	7.7
Democratic	Zahra Karinshak	5,729	6.8
Total votes		84,711	100.0

2022 Georgia's 7th state senate district Democratic primary
Party	Candidate	Votes	%
Democratic	Nabilah Islam	5,745	50.3
Democratic	Beth Moore	5,668	49.7
Total votes		11,413	100.0

2022 Georgia's 7th state senate district general election
Party	Candidate	Votes	%
Democratic	Nabilah Islam	32,607	52.8
Republican	Josh McKay	29,123	47.2
Total votes		61,730	100.0
