= Kevin Abel =

American politician

Kevin Albel

Member-elect of the Georgia State Senate from the 14th district
- Assuming office January 2027
- Succeeding: Josh McLaurin

Personal details
- Party: Democratic

Kevin Abel is an American politician. A member of the Democratic Party, he is the member-elect for the 14th district of the Georgia State Senate.
