= 2012 Georgia state elections =

2012 Georgia elections
- November 6, 2012

A general election was held in the U.S. state of Georgia on November 6, 2012. Along with the presidential election, all of Georgia's fourteen seats in the United States House of Representatives and all seats in both houses of the Georgia General Assembly were up for election, as were two seats on the Georgia Public Service Commission. Primary elections were held on July 31, 2012. Primary runoffs, necessary if no candidate wins a majority of the vote, were held on August 21.

== Federal Elections ==
=== President of the United States ===
Despite incumbent president Barack Obama winning the overall election, Republican Mitt Romney won the state with 53.3% of the popular vote and earned 16 electoral votes in total.

=== United States House of Representatives ===
Republicans won 9 out of 14 districts after a newly drawn congressional map was approved and signed by Governor Nathan Deal.

== Georgia General Assembly ==
All 56 seats in the Georgia State Senate and 180 seats in the Georgia House of Representatives were up for election.

=== Georgia State Senate ===
Party	Before	After	Change
Republican	36	38	▲2
Democratic	20	18	▼2
Total	56	56	

=== Georgia House of Representatives ===
Party	Before	After	Change
Republican	114	119	▲5
Democratic	63	60	▼3
Independent	1	1	Steady
Vacant	2	0	▼2
Total	180	180	

== Public Service Commission ==
District 3 (Metro Atlanta) and District 5 (Western) of the Georgia Public Service Commission were up for election.

=== District 3 ===
2012 Georgia Public Service Commission District 3 election
- November 6, 2012
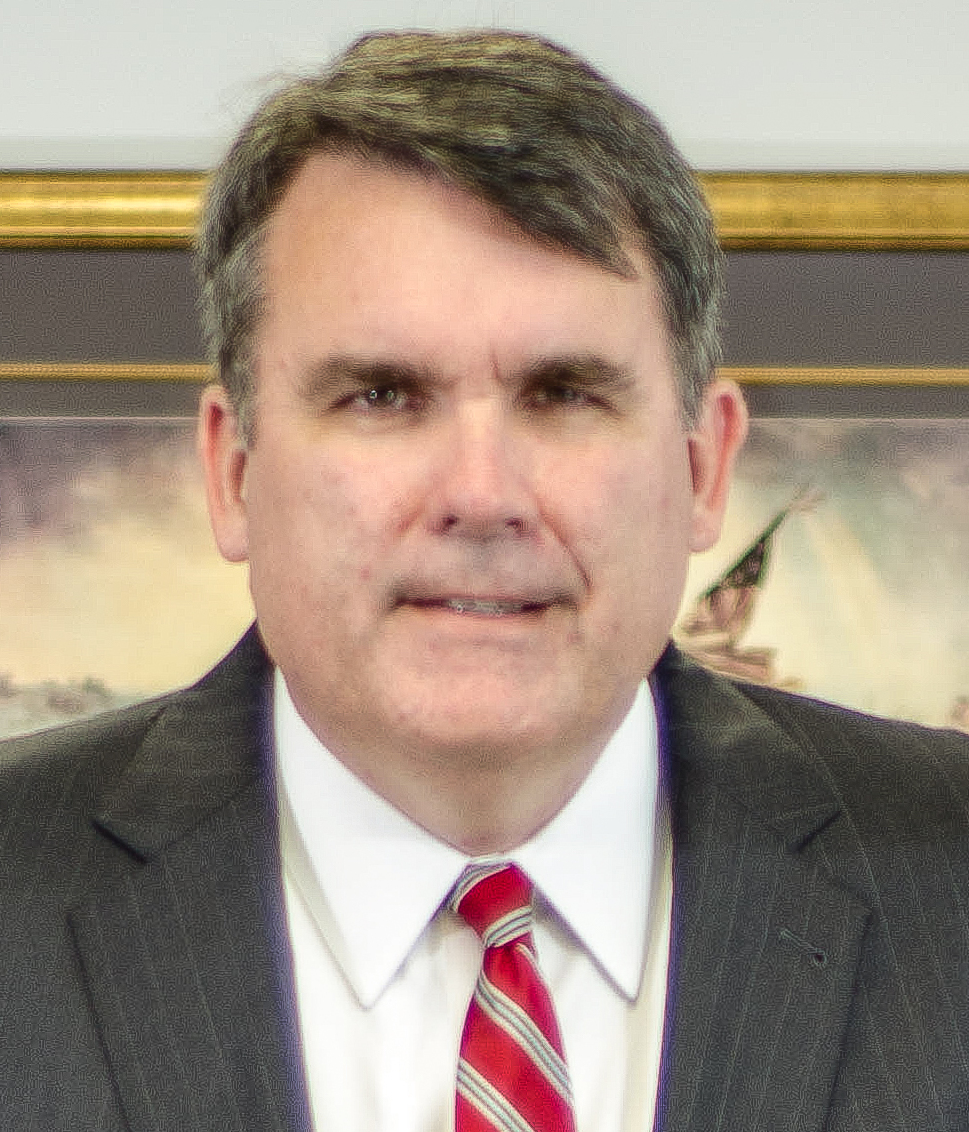

Candidate	Chuck Eaton	Stephen Oppenheimer
Party	Republican	Democratic
Popular vote	1,858,663	1,537,923
Percentage	52.10%	43.10%
- Eaton: 40–50% 50–60% 60–70% 70–80% 80–90% Oppenheimer: 40–50% 50–60% 60–70% 70–80% 80–90%
Commissioner before election
Chuck Eaton
Republican
Elected Commissioner
Chuck Eaton
Republican

Incumbent commissioner Chuck Eaton sought re-election to a second term in office.

==== Republican primary ====
- Chuck Eaton, incumbent.
- Matt Reid

==== Primary results ====
Republican primary results
Party	Candidate	Votes	%
Republican	Chuck Eaton (incumbent)	506,062	59.89
Republican	Matt Reid	338,858	40.11
Total votes		844,920	100

==== General election ====
2012 Georgia Public Service Commission District 3 election
Party	Candidate	Votes	%
Republican	Chuck Eaton (incumbent)	1,858,663	52.10
Democratic	Stephen Oppenheimer	1,537,923	43.10
Libertarian	Brad Ploeger	171,138	4.80
Total votes		3,567,724	100
Republican hold			

=== District 5 ===
2012 Georgia Public Service Commission District 5 election
- November 6, 2012

Candidate	Stan Wise	David Staples
Party	Republican	Libertarian
Popular vote	2,110,146	1,095,115
Percentage	65.83%	34.17%
- County results Wise: 50–60% 60–70% 70–80% 80–90% Staples: 50–60% 60–70%
Commissioner before election
Stan Wise
Republican
Elected Commissioner
Stan Wise
Republican

Incumbent commissioner Stan Wise sought re-election to a fourth term in office.

==== Republican primary ====
- Stan Wise, incumbent.
- Pam Davidson

==== Primary results ====
Republican primary results
Party	Candidate	Votes	%
Republican	Stan Wise (incumbent)	470,937	56.51
Republican	Pam Davidson	362,424	43.49
Total votes		833,361	100

==== General election ====
2012 Georgia Public Service Commission District 5 election
Party	Candidate	Votes	%
Republican	Stan Wise (incumbent)	2,110,146	65.83
Libertarian	David Staples	1,095,115	34.17
Total votes		3,205,261	100
Republican hold			

== Judicial Elections ==
Three seats on the Georgia Supreme Court and five seats on the Georgia Court of Appeals were up for statewide elections. Supreme Court justices Carol Hunstein, Harold Melton and Hugh Thompson and Court of Appeals judges Michael Boggs, Stephen Dillard, John Ellington, Yvette Miller and Herbert Phipps all won their respective races uncontested.

== Ballot Measures ==
=== Amendment 1 ===
Results by county Yes: 70–80%; 60–70%; 50–60%; No: 70–80%; 60–70%; 50–60%

Allows state or local approval of public charter schools upon the request of local communities.

Amendment 1
Choice	Votes	%
For	2,178,183	58.58
Against	1,540,198	41.42
Total	3,718,381	100.00

=== Amendment 2 ===
Results by county Yes: 70–80%; 60–70%; 50–60%; No: 50–60%

Gives the State Properties Commission the authority to enter into multiyear lease agreements.

Amendment 2
Choice	Votes	%
For	2,266,980	63.77
Against	1,287,761	36.23
Total	3,554,741	100.00
