= Steven McNeel =

American politician

Member of the Georgia Senate from the 18th district
- Incumbent
- Assumed office February 24, 2026
- Preceded by: John F. Kennedy

Personal details
- Party: Republican

Steven Royce McNeel is an American politician who is a member of the Georgia Senate, representing the 18th district. A Republican, he won the seat in a February 2026 special election.

== Political career ==
In December 2025, John F. Kennedy, a Republican member of the Georgia Senate representing the 18th district, resigned to focus on his run for lieutenant governor. The district, covering all of Crawford County, Monroe County, Peach County, Upson County, and parts of Bibb County and Houston County, had been represented by Kennedy since 2014. McNeel ran to fill the remainder of Kennedy's term as a Republican, facing five candidates: four Republicans, and one Democrat, LeMario Brown. Special elections in Georgia use a two-round system system, where candidates of all parties compete on the same ballot, with a runoff if no candidate receives a majority of the vote in the first round. In the first round, held on January 20, 2026, Brown placed first, with 36.9% of the vote, followed by McNeel, with 21.3% of the vote. In the runoff, McNeel defeated Brown, receiving 59.4% of the vote.

== Electoral history ==
2026 Georgia's 18th Senate district special election
Primary election
Party	Candidate	Votes	%
Democratic	LeMario Nicholas Brown	7,947	36.93%
Republican	Steven McNeel	4,581	21.29%
Republican	Eric S. Wilson	4,357	20.25%
Republican	Lauren Daniel	4,052	18.83%
Republican	Nathan Warnock	310	1.44%
Republican	Eugene Allison	271	1.26%
Total votes		21,518	100.0
General election
Republican	Steven McNeel	14,998	59.42%
Democratic	LeMario Nicholas Brown	10,244	40.58%
Total votes		25,242	100.0
Republican hold			
