= Lanny Thomas =

American politician

Member of the Georgia Senate from the 53rd district
- Incumbent
- Assumed office April 23, 2026
- Preceded by: Colton Moore

Personal details
- Party: Republican
- Website: Campaign website

Lanny Thomas is an American politician who was elected as a member of the Georgia State Senate from the 53rd district in 2026. He was elected in a special election.
