= Jaha Howard =

American politician

Member of the Georgia Senate from the 35th district
- Incumbent
- Assumed office December 31, 2025
- Preceded by: Jason Esteves

Personal details
- Party: Democratic
- Website: www.jahahoward.com

Jaha Ven Jari Howard is an American dentist and politician who represents the 35th district in the Georgia State Senate. He was first elected in the 2025 special election to replace Jason Esteves, who had resigned to pursue a gubernatorial campaign.

After no candidate received more than 50% of the vote in the November election, a runoff election was held in December, and Howard defeated Roger Bruce with 51.9% of the vote. He was sworn in on December 31. Howard had previously served on the school board for Cobb County, and run for Georgia Superintendent of Schools.

Howard also ran for state senate in 2016, but lost to Hunter Hill; after Hill resigned to pursue a gubernatorial campaign, Howard ran again in 2017. On this occasion, he faced criticism after the revelation of "sexist and homophobic" statements he had posted to Facebook from 2011 to 2014; he apologized, but lost that race to Jen Jordan.

== Early life and education ==
Howard received a Bachelor of Science in chemistry and Doctorate of dental surgery from Howard University and a specialty certificate in pediatric dentistry and Master's in oral sciences at the University of Illinois Chicago.
