= Zahra Karinshak =

American attorney and former state senator

Zahra S. Karinshak

Member of the Georgia Senate from the 48th district
- In office January 14, 2019 – January 11, 2021
- Preceded by: David Shafer
- Succeeded by: Michelle Au

Personal details
- Born: Zahra Sheikholeslam Chattanooga, Tennessee, U.S.
- Party: Democratic
- Spouse: Bruce Karinshak
- Children: 2
- Education: USAFA (BS); Emory University (JD)

Military service
- Allegiance: United States
- Branch: United States Air Force
- Service years: 1989–1994
- Rank: Captain
- Awards: Meritorious Service Medal; Air Force Commendation

Zahra Sheikholeslam Karinshak is an American attorney, and former state senator, who represented the 48th Georgia State Senate district.

== Early life and career ==
Karinshak was born in Chattanooga, Tennessee, the oldest of five children. She grew up in LaFayette, Georgia, where she attended LaFayette High School.

In 1985, Karinshak was nominated by Congressman George Darden to attend the United States Air Force Academy, where she served as a soaring instructor pilot. She graduated in 1989 with a BS degree in International Affairs and a Minor in Arabic. She was also recognized as the Top Graduate in Law. Karinshak was subsequently commissioned as an intelligence officer in the United States Air Force.

As an Air Force officer, Karinshak received numerous military awards, including the Meritorious Service Medal and the Air Force Commendation Medal. She completed her Air Force service as a Captain in 1994.

After her military service, Karinshak attended the Emory University School of Law where she was Editor-in-Chief of the Emory Law Journal and graduated with honors. Karinshak then served as a judicial law clerk to the Honorable J.L. Edmondson on the Eleventh Circuit Court of Appeals. After completing her clerkship, Karinshak was a litigation associate at Sutherland Asbill and Brennan in Atlanta. She served as an Assistant United States Attorney in Atlanta from 2003 to 2011, prosecuting fraud, human trafficking, child predators, firearms trafficking, and violent crimes. She also served as Deputy Executive Counsel to Governor Roy Barnes from 1999 to 2003, where she helped change the then-controversial Georgia state flag and managed judicial, military, and law enforcement affairs.

Karinshak has served as a partner at the Atlanta-based law firm of Krevolin & Horst, LLC since 2011, where she leads the firm’s whistleblower and white collar criminal defense practices.

== Political career ==
In August 2017, Karinshak announced her candidacy for the Georgia State Senate, seeking to represent the 48th district. On November 6, 2018, Karinshak was elected to the Georgia State Senate with 53.6% of the vote.

== Personal life ==
Karinshak has lived in Lawrenceville, Georgia since 1994 with her husband, Bruce, and their two children. Karinshak's husband and two of her four siblings are also military veterans.
