= Adrienne White =

American politician

Member of the Georgia State Senate from the 7th district
- Incumbent
- Assumed office June 26, 2026
- Preceded by: Nabilah Parkes

Personal details
- Born: 1980 or 1981 (age 45–46)
- Party: Democratic
- Spouse: Kirkland Carden (m. 2025)
- Children: 1
- Education: University of Virginia

Adrienne Annice White Carden (born 1980/1981) is an American certified public accountant and politician who is a member of the Georgia State Senate for District 7. She won a special election in June 2026 to replace Nabilah Parkes, who resigned to focus on running for lieutenant governor, and committed to not run for a full term in the general election to be held in November 2026. She is the wife of Gwinnett County commissioner Kirkland Carden.

== Early life and career ==
White is originally from Virginia. She is currently a SVP and not-for-profit relationship manager at SouthState Bank and was previously VP of Strategy at Citizens Trust Bank. She was VP of finance of the National Center for Civil and Human Rights after holding several finance roles at The Coca-Cola Company and spending the first four years of her career at Ernst & Young LLP’s external audit services.

== Political career ==
White recruited Democratic volunteers in the 2016 elections and 2018 elections. In May 2018, she was noted as the chair of Red Clay Democrats, a political organization increasing young professionals' participation in Georgia politics.

== Personal life ==
White moved to the Atlanta area from Virginia more than a decade prior to May 2018, having been attracted to the area due to its sizeable Black middle class. White resides in Duluth, Georgia, with her husband, Gwinnett County commissioner Kirkland Carden, and their son.
