= Brandon Beach =

American politician (born 1961)

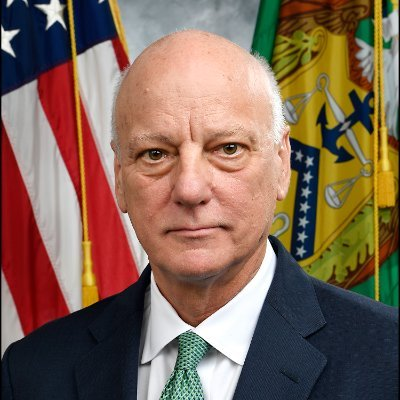
- Official portrait, 2025

46th Treasurer of the United States
- Incumbent
- Assumed office May 5, 2025
- President: Donald Trump
- Preceded by: Lynn Malerba

Member of the Georgia Senate from the 21st district
- In office January 14, 2013 – May 4, 2025
- Preceded by: Chip Rogers
- Succeeded by: Jason Dickerson

Personal details
- Born: Brandon Lamont Beach; May 2, 1961 (age 65) Louisiana, U.S.
- Party: Republican
- Spouse: Shuntel
- Children: 2
- Education: Louisiana State University (BA); Centenary College of Louisiana (MBA)

Brandon Lamont Beach (born May 2, 1961) is an American politician who has served as the 46th treasurer of the United States since 2025. A member of the Republican Party, he served as a member of the Georgia State Senate from 2013 to 2025; representing the 21st district, which includes portions of Cherokee and Fulton counties.

In March 2025, he was named as the next US treasurer, and took office on May 5, 2025.

== Early life and education ==
Born in Louisiana on May 2, 1961, Brandon Beach earned his Bachelor of Science from Louisiana State University. A proud LSU alumnus, he was recently featured in an Alumni Spotlight by the LSU Alumni Association, recognizing his ongoing leadership, career achievements, and dedicated service. He holds a Master of Business Administration (MBA) from Centenary. He is a former member of the Alpharetta City Council and the Alpharetta Planning and Zoning Commission. As of January 2013, Brandon Beach is the president and CEO of the North Fulton Chamber of Commerce.

== Political career ==
Beach was elected in 2012 and sworn into the Georgia Senate in 2013. He sat on the Senate Economic Development, Government Oversight, Science and Technology, and served as Chairman of the Transportation committee. In 2019, Beach ran for the Republican nomination to challenge current Representative Lucy McBath in Georgia's 6th Congressional District. On November 14, 2019, Beach withdrew from the race and announced he would seek reelection. Beach ran unopposed in 2020. He was a member of the Georgia Freedom Caucus.

Beach was confirmed to have COVID-19 in early March 2020, showing symptoms on March 10, 2020, and being tested on March 14. In spite of showing symptoms, he attended a special session of the state Senate on March 16. The positive test results arrived on March 18. His actions led the entire Georgia State Senate, as well as staffers and others, to enter self-isolation and quarantine until the end of March 2020. Beach's failure to follow coronavirus protocols angered many within the Georgia State Senate. Governor Brian Kemp stated that Beach's actions were a clear example of what not to do if you felt sick. Testing confirmed at least four other members of the Senate with positive test results. Beach responded that he is "not a bad person", and that he thought it was bronchitis.

After Joe Biden won the 2020 presidential election in Georgia, Beach backed attempts to overturn the presidential vote in Georgia over baseless fraud allegations. Lt. Gov. Geoff Duncan subsequently stripped Beach of his chairmanship of the Transportation Committee. In July, 2022, Fulton County prosecutor Fani Willis announced that she had sent a target letter to Beach and two other Republican officials, warning them that they face indictment in connection with their role in the fake electors scheme, which was part of the attempts to overturn the 2020 United States presidential election. Beach in turn supported efforts to investigate Willis for having an inappropriate relationship with the special prosecutor she selected.

In January 2024, Beach co-sponsored S.B. 390, which would withhold government funding for any libraries in Georgia affiliated with the American Library Association. The bill was drafted following the election of ALA President Emily Drabinski and allegations of the organization promoting a personal ideology and influencing librarian certification.

== Treasurer of the United States (2025–present) ==
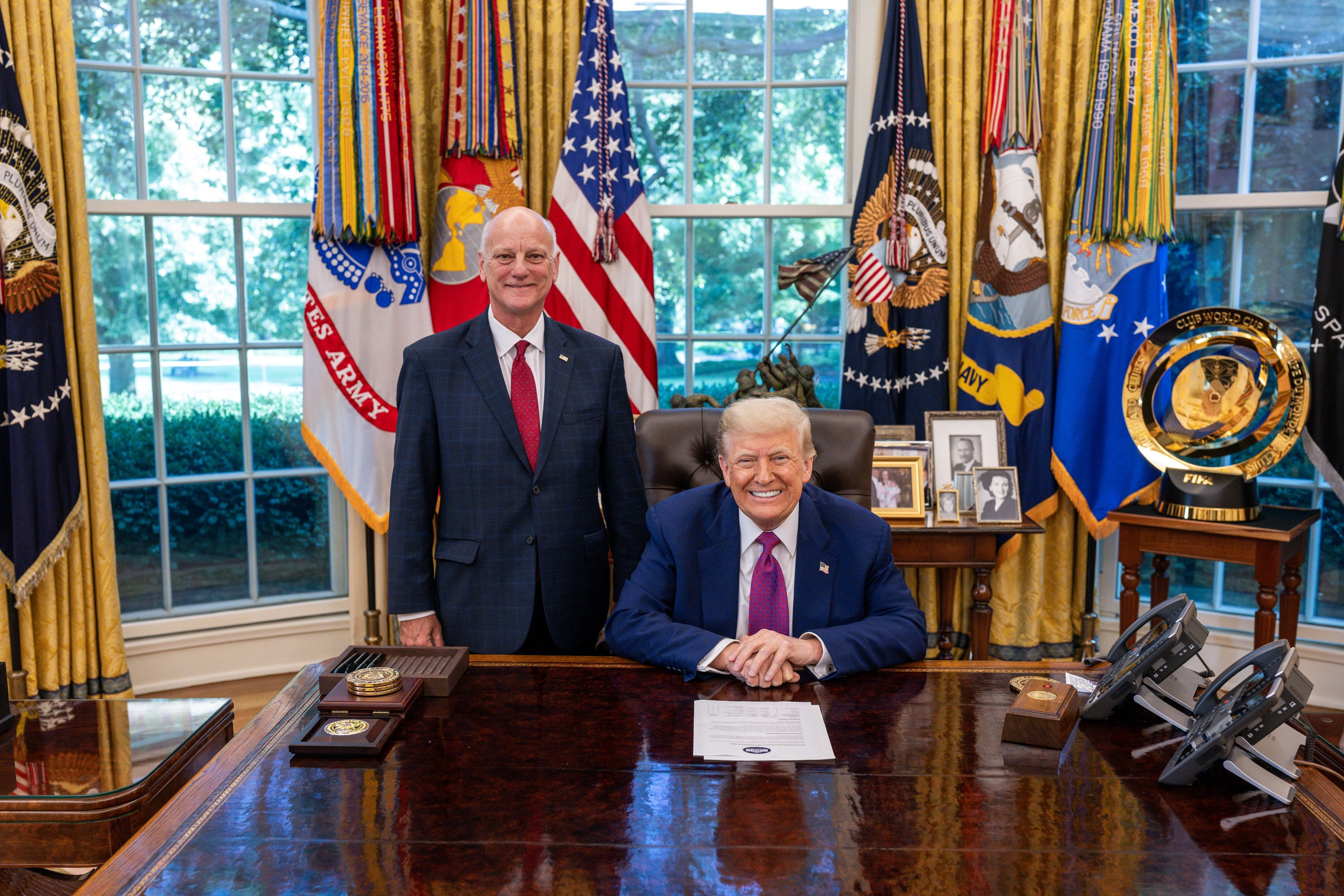
Beach with President Donald Trump in the Oval Office, August 2025

On May 28, 2025, Beach was appointed as the 46th treasurer of the United States by President Donald Trump. He became the first male treasurer since William Alexander Julian, who died in office in 1949, 76 years prior.

On March 26, 2026, the Treasury Department announced that the signature of President Donald Trump would begin appearing on U.S. dollars later in 2026, appearing where Beach's signature currently appears. In a statement, Beach said "Printing [Trump's] signature on the American currency is not only appropriate, but also well deserved.”

== See also ==
- List of state government committees (Georgia)

Political offices
Preceded by Marilynn Malerba	Treasurer of the United States; 2025–present	Incumbent
