= Freddie Sims =

American politician from Georgia

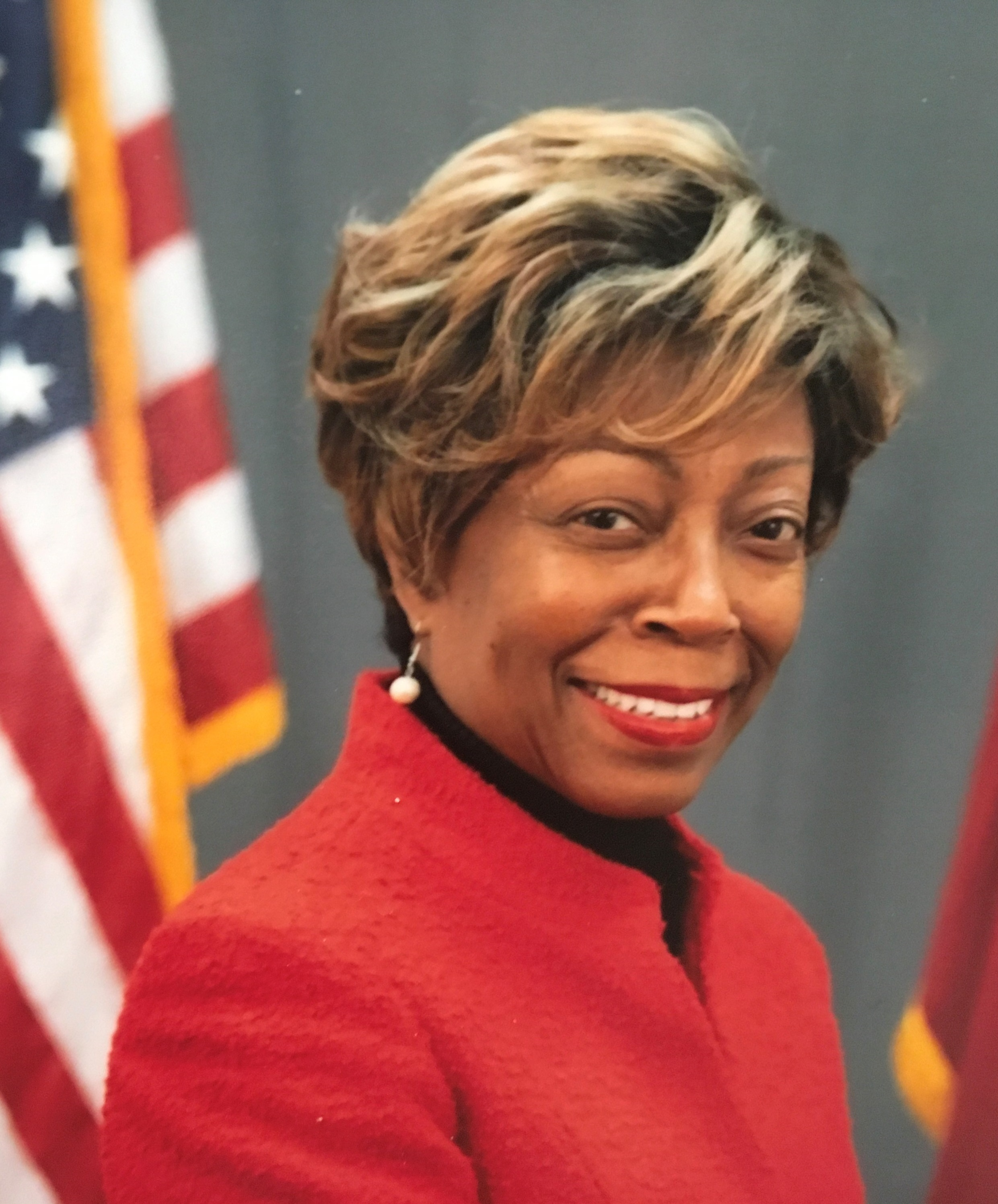

Member of the Georgia State Senate from the 12th district
- Incumbent
- Assumed office January 12, 2009
- Preceded by: Michael Meyer von Bremen
- Succeeded by: Edward Brown (elect)

Member of the Georgia House of Representatives from the 151st district
- In office January 10, 2005 – January 12, 2009
- Preceded by: Tom Bordeaux
- Succeeded by: Carol Fullerton

Personal details
- Born: Freddie Powell Sims; November 1, 1950 (age 76) Talbotton, Georgia
- Party: Democratic

Freddie Powell Sims (born November 1, 1950) is an American politician who has represented the 12th district in the Georgia State Senate since 2009. She previously served in the Georgia House of Representatives from the 151st district from 2005 to 2009, and . She announced in March 2026 that she would withdraw her candidacy for a tenth term in the Georgia Senate due to her husband's illness.
