= Georgia's 18th Senate district =

Georgia's 18th State Senate District

Georgia's 18th State Senate district
Senator
Steven McNeel; R–Macon
- Demographics: 58.41% White; 30.01% Black; 5.18% Hispanic; 2.42% Asian; 0.22% Native American; 0.03% Hawaiian/Pacific Islander; 0.73% Other; 4.25% Multiracial
- Population (2020) • Voting age: 191,825; 150,196

District 18 of the Georgia Senate is located in Middle Georgia, anchored in the Macon metropolitan area.

The district includes western Macon-Bibb County, northwestern Houston County, and all of Crawford, Monroe, Peach, and Upson counties. Cities in the district include Byron, Centerville, Forsyth, Fort Valley, Thomaston, and parts of Macon and Warner Robins.

State senator John F. Kennedy retired on December 8, 2025 to pursue a run for Lieutenant Governor of Georgia. A special election was triggered for January 20, 2026, with a runoff for February 17, 2026. Republican Steven McNeel won the runoff against Democrat LeMario Brown, becoming the new senator.
