= Clint Dixon =

American politician

Member of the Georgia State Senate from the 45th district
- Incumbent
- Assumed office January 11, 2021
- Preceded by: Renee Unterman

Personal details
- Born: Clinton Randall Dixon; July 16, 1979 (age 47)
- Party: Republican

Clinton Randall Dixon is an American politician from Georgia. He is a Republican member of the Georgia State Senate for District 45.

In August, 2023, Dixon announced that he would use a newly passed Georgia law to attempt to remove Fani Willis from office. Willis is the district attorney of Fulton County, Georgia, and she issued 41 felony charges in the Prosecution of Donald Trump in Georgia. In a statement, Dixon said, "Once the Prosecutorial Oversight Committee is appointed in October, we can have them investigate and take action against Fani Willis and her efforts that weaponize the justice system against political opponents". He accused Willis of having an "unabashed goal to become some sort of leftist celebrity."

On November 22, 2023, the Supreme Court of Georgia did not approve rules of the above referenced oversight commission, "In an unsigned order, justices said they have 'grave doubts' about their ability to regulate the duties of district attorneys beyond the practice of law. They said that because lawmakers hadn’t expressly ordered justices to act, they were refusing to rule one way or the other."

== Legislation ==
During the 2022-2033 legislative session, Dixon sponsored SB 141, which would have banned gender affirming care for youth under age 18 and required schools to out gender diverse students to their parents. SB 141 did not receive a vote. Instead, SB 140 was passed into law, and it bans gender affirming healthcare for youth under age 18 but allows for the use of puberty blockers.

In January 2024, Dixon co-sponsored S.B. 390, which would withhold government funding for any libraries in Georgia affiliated with the American Library Association.

== Alliances ==
Dixon supports Frontline Policy Action, a Family Policy Council of the Christian nationalist group Family Policy Alliance. In a show of support for Frontline Policy Action, Dixon attended the group's fundraising gala on October 6, 2023, posted photos to his Facebook page with the statement, "Grateful for Frontline Policy Action and what they have done for our state and what they are going to do. We are in a fight for the spiritual soul of our state."

During the 2022-2023 legislative session, Dixon voted in support of SB 140, which denied healthcare for gender diverse children against the position of every U.S. major medical association and restricted the rights of their parents.

Dixon supports Moms for Liberty and participated in the group's town hall on November 13, 2023, at the Gas South Convention Center in Duluth, GA.
