= Matt Brass =

American politician

Member of the Georgia State Senate from the 28th district
- Incumbent
- Assumed office January 9, 2017
- Preceded by: Mike Crane

Personal details
- Born: Matthew Freeman Brass; January 19, 1978 (age 48) Newnan, Georgia, U.S.
- Party: Republican
- Education: University of Georgia (BS)

Matthew Freeman Brass (born January 19, 1978) is an American politician who has served in the Georgia State Senate from the 28th district since 2017.

After Joe Biden won the 2020 presidential election in Georgia, Brass backed attempts to review the presidential vote in Georgia over false claims of fraud in many of the counties across the state. Lt. Gov. Geoff Duncan subsequently demoted Brass from being chairman of the committee that draws the political map in Georgia to the lesser posting of chairman of the banking committee.

In January 2024, Brass co-sponsored S.B. 390, which would withhold government funding for any libraries in Georgia affiliated with the American Library Association.
