= Tim Bearden =

American politician from Georgia

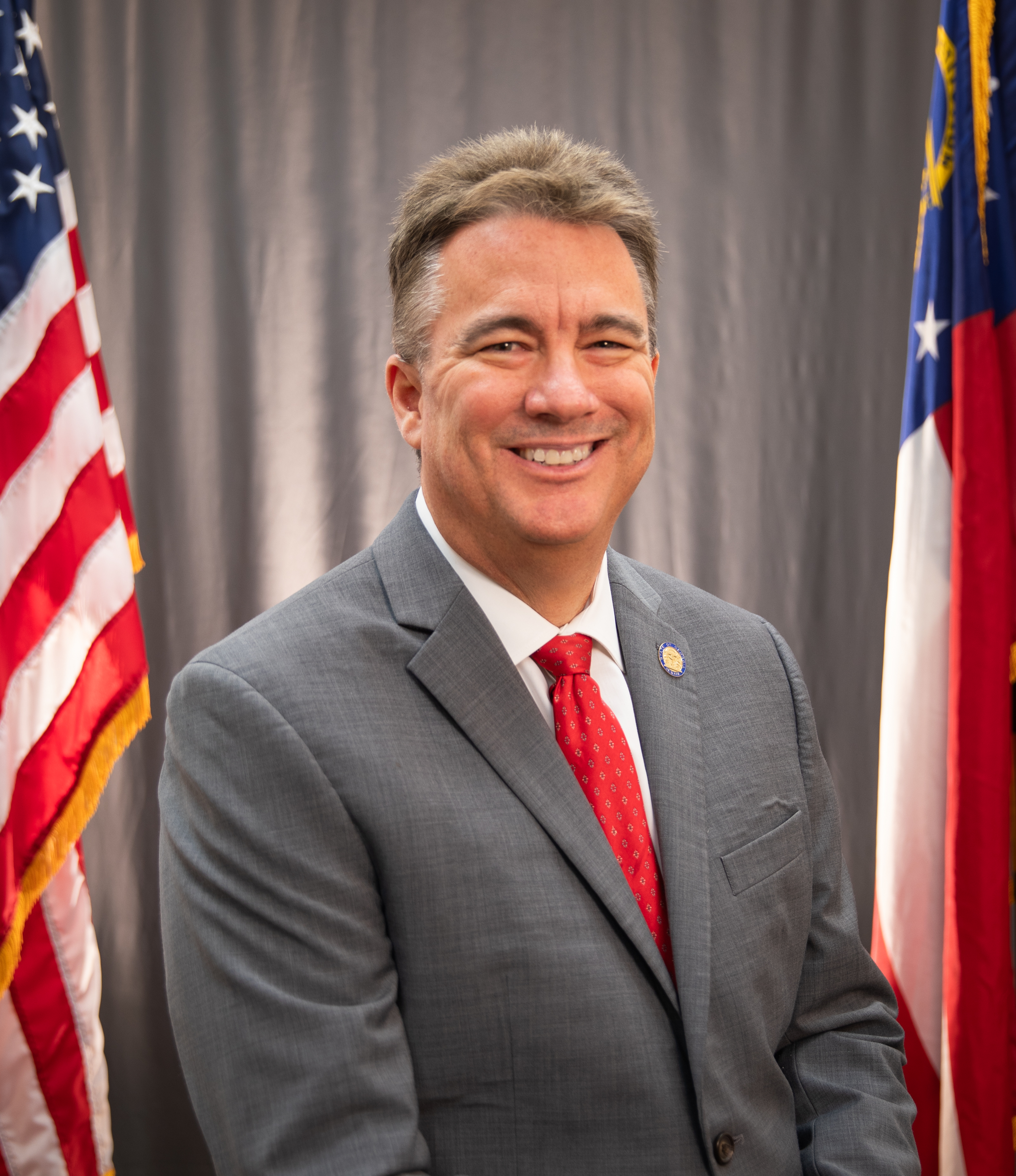

Member of the Georgia State Senate from the 30th district
- Incumbent
- Assumed office February 21, 2024
- Preceded by: Mike Dugan

Member of the Georgia House of Representatives from the 68th district
- In office January 10, 2005 – November 1, 2011
- Preceded by: Chuck Harper
- Succeeded by: Dustin Hightower

Personal details
- Born: May 8, 1967 (age 58) Japan
- Party: Republican
- Spouse: Triska Bearden
- Children: 2

Timothy J. Bearden is an American politician. He is a member of the Georgia State Senate from the 30th district, serving since 2024 after winning a special election to replace previous senator Mike Dugan. He previously served in the Georgia House of Representatives from the 68th district, serving from 2005 to 2011. He is a member of the Republican Party. Bearden was also appointed director of the Georgia Public Safety Training Center by former governor Nathan Deal in 2011.
