= Georgia's 30th Senate district =

Georgia's 30th State Senate district
Senator
Tim Bearden; R–Carrollton
- Demographics: 63.02% White; 22.85% Black; 7.93% Hispanic; 1.03% Asian; 0.25% Native American; 0.03% Hawaiian/Pacific Islander; 0.56% Other; 5.78% Multiracial
- Population (2020) • Voting age: 191,617; 144,068

District 30 of the Georgia Senate is located in western Metro Atlanta and West Georgia.

The district includes northern Carroll, western Douglas, and southwestern Paulding counties, and all of Haralson County. Communities include Bremen, Buchanan, Fairfield Plantation, Fairplay, Mount Zion, Tallapoosa, Temple, Villa Rica, and Waco, and parts of Carrollton, Dallas, and Douglasville.

The current senator is Tim Bearden, a Republican from Carrollton first elected in a special election in February 2024. He previously served in the Georgia House of Representatives.
