= Georgia's 6th Senate district =

American legislative district

Coordinates: 33°22′N 84°53′W

Georgia's 6th State Senate district
Senator
Matt Brass; R–Newnan
- Demographics: 70.38% White; 16.31% Black; 6.80% Hispanic; 1.88% Asian; 0.20% Native American; 0.04% Hawaiian/Pacific Islander; 0.42% Other; 5.18% Multiracial
- Population (2020) • Voting age: 191,052; 146,190

District 6 of the Georgia Senate is a senatorial district in southwestern Metro Atlanta and West Georgia.

The district includes Coweta and Heard counties, as well as the southern part of Carroll County and some parts of Carrollton.

The current senator is Matt Brass, a Republican from Newnan first elected in 2016.

== District officeholders ==
Years	Senator	Counties in district
2001–2002	Tommie Williams (R)	–
2003–2004	Ginger Collins (D)	Cobb, Marietta, Smyrna
2005–2006	Doug Stoner (D)	Cobb, Marietta, Smyrna
2007–2008	Doug Stoner (D)	Cobb, Marietta, Smyrna
2009–2010	Doug Stoner (D)	Cobb, Marietta, Smyrna
2011–2012	Doug Stoner (D)	Cobb, Marietta, Smyrna
2013–2014	Hunter Hill (R)	(Note: A map is provided on the Georgia Senate website showing the district coverage as of 2013.)
2015–2016	Hunter Hill (R)	(Note: A map is provided on the Georgia Senate website showing the district coverage as of 2013.)
2017–2018	Jennifer Jordan (D)	
2019–2020	Jennifer Jordan (D)	
2021–2022	Jennifer Jordan (D)	
2023–2024	Matt Brass (R)	Carroll (part), Coweta, Heard
2025–2026	Matt Brass (R)	Carroll (part), Coweta, Heard
