= Emanuel Jones =

American politician

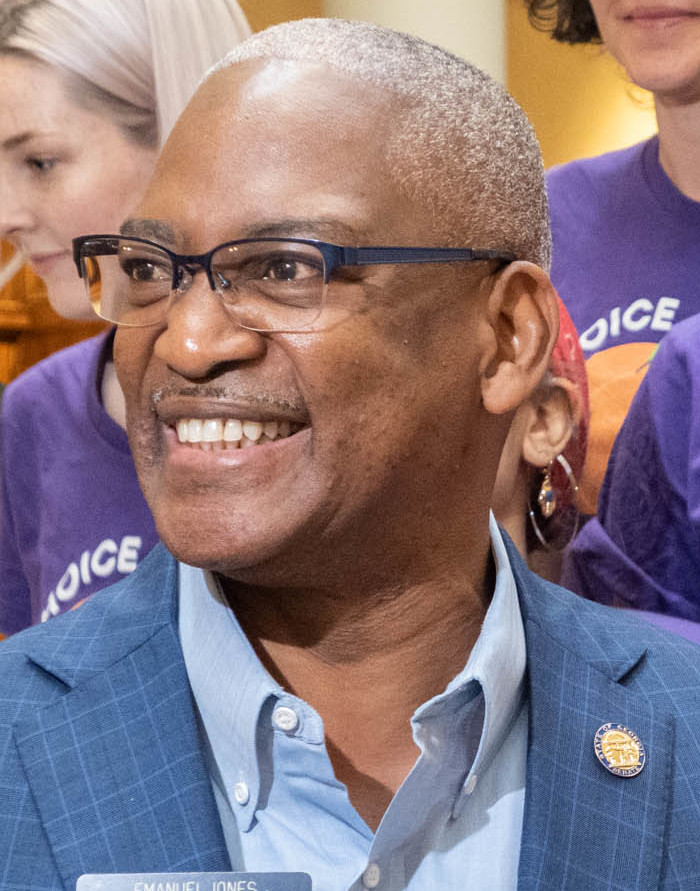
- Jones in 2019

Member of the Georgia State Senate from the 10th district
- Incumbent
- Assumed office January 10, 2005
- Preceded by: Nadine Thomas

Personal details
- Born: Emanuel Davie Jones; April 1, 1959 (age 67) Atlanta, Georgia, U.S.
- Party: Democratic
- Education: University of Pennsylvania (BS); Columbia University (MBA)

Emanuel Davie Jones (born April 1, 1959) is an American politician and businessman, who has served in the Georgia State Senate from the 10th district since 2005. He attended the University of Pennsylvania where he received a bachelor's degree in Electrical Engineering and Columbia University where he received an MBA in Finance/Accounting. He was commissioned a Second Lieutenant in the U.S. Army Corps of Engineers in 1980 and rose to the rank of captain.

On January 22, 2025, Jones announced his campaign for Georgia's 13th congressional district against incumbent Democrat David Scott during the 2026 midterm elections.

Jones is a long-time member and Chairman Emeritus of the Sino-Phil Asia International Peace Awards, a charitable foundation in the Philippines which works to promote peace through action, enhance the quality of life for all humanity, and understand peace with a perspective from Asia.

== Honors and awards ==
- (Philippines) : Order of the Knights of Rizal, Knight Commander of Rizal (KCR) - (October 25, 2019).
