= Jason Esteves =

American attorney and politician (born 1983)

- Official portrait, 2025

Member of the Georgia State Senate from the 35th district
- In office January 9, 2023 – September 10, 2025
- Preceded by: Jen Jordan
- Succeeded by: Jaha Howard

Personal details
- Born: Jason Fernando Esteves; July 19, 1983 (age 43) Columbus, Georgia, U.S.
- Party: Democratic
- Education: University of Miami (BA); Emory University (JD)

Jason Fernando Esteves (born July 19, 1983) is an American attorney, businessman, and politician who represented Georgia's 35th Senate district from 2023 until his resignation in 2025. He served as an at-large representative and later as Board Chair of the Atlanta Public Schools Board of Education from 2013 until he assumed office in the Georgia State Senate. He assumed office on January 9, 2023, after being elected in November 2022. He is a member of the Democratic Party.

In April 2025, Esteves announced that he would run for Governor of Georgia in the state's 2026 gubernatorial election. Later that year, he resigned from the Georgia State Senate to focus on his campaign.

== Early life and education ==
Jason Esteves was born in Columbus, Georgia, to Linda and Fernando Esteves. He attended South Columbus Elementary and Eddy Middle School. He is of Afro–Puerto Rican descent.

Esteves attended Columbus High School for his first two years before graduating high school in Orlando, Florida. He later earned a Bachelor of Arts degree in psychology from the University of Miami and a Juris Doctor from the Emory University School of Law.

== Early career ==
After graduating from college, Esteves joined Teach For America, where he taught social studies at a public middle school in Houston, Texas. He worked as an associate at McKenna Long & Aldridge in Atlanta from 2010 to 2014. Esteves joined Equifax as assistant general counsel in 2014 and became vice president of legal in 2019. In 2023, he and his wife opened the Flying Biscuit Cafe in Columbus, and in 2025 opened a second location in Macon. He is currently of counsel at Hudson Cook LLP.

=== Atlanta School Board ===
From 2014 to 2022, he served as an at-large representative of the Atlanta Board of Education and as its chair from 2018 to 2021.

== Georgia State Senate ==
=== Election ===
He was elected to the Georgia State Senate in November 2022. During his campaign, Esteves was endorsed by the Latino Victory Fund, the National Democratic Redistricting Committee, the Human Rights Campaign and Georgia Equality. He ran unopposed for reelection in 2024, and was endorsed for reelection by Democrats for Education Reform, Vote Common Good, Reproductive Freedom for All, CASA in Action, Fair Fight Action and United Auto Workers.

=== Tenure ===
Esteves served on multiple Georgia State Senate Committees including the Children and Families Committee, the Agriculture and Consumer Affairs Committee, the Finance Committee, the State and Local Governmental Affairs Committee, and the Ethics Committee.

In 2024, the Georgia Senate Democratic Caucus elected Esteves to serve as the vice chair of finance for their caucus.

He resigned on September 10, 2025, in order to focus on his gubernatorial campaign.

==== Education ====
Esteves supported increased funding for public schools and authored legislation to establish health savings accounts for Georgia government employees.

In a 2021 op-ed, Esteves supported a transition to zero-emission electric school busses. Esteves has also advocated for supporting and strengthening special education programs. He is a critic of Georgia's school voucher program.

==== Abortion ====
Esteves supports legal access to abortion. In 2023, he sponsored legislation to repeal Georgia House Bill 481, the so-called "heartbeat" bill passed in 2019. This bill outlaws most abortions after the detection of a fetal heartbeat.

==== Healthcare ====
Esteves supports Medicaid expansion. In a 2025 op-ed in the Ledger-Enquirer, Esteves argued for a bill he introduced that would allow Medicare to cover expenses for assisted living and care facilities.

==== Housing ====
In 2025, Esteves proposed legislation that would stop private equity firms from being allowed to purchase houses.

==== Buckhead cityhood ====
In 2023, Esteves opposed the effort to let the Atlanta neighborhood, Buckhead, secede from the city of Atlanta, claiming the proposed breakaway measures were "at best half-baked plans that would endanger the livelihoods of all Georgians, especially [his] Buckhead constituents."

In 2025, Humberto Garcia-Sjogrim, a co-founder of the movement to block Buckhead cityhood, endorsed Esteves's candidacy for governor.

==== Other political positions ====
In 2022 Esteves supported a nonpartisan commission for redistricting. In the same year, he opposed allowing the concealed carry of firearms without a license. In a 2022 letter that he wrote, Esteves endorsed the expansion of the U.S. Supreme Court.

In 2023, Esteves introduced a bill to require governmental agencies to redact personal identifying information from public records about public officials.

In 2024, in a hearing on AI, he said that the legislature must support AI while also protecting people from its repercussions. In a letter that same year, Esteves urged President Joe Biden to extend work visas to long-term migrants.

In 2025, Esteves proposed replacing the statue of Confederate leader Alexander Stephens in the U.S. Capitol with former President Jimmy Carter, citing his legacy of human rights and public service. Also in 2025, Esteves introduced a resolution honoring the International Franchise Association and its former president Doc Cohen for boosting economic growth and making contributions to communities coast to coast. Also in 2025, Esteves co-sponsored a bipartisan bill that declared children being unsupervised is not child neglect and those decisions should be left to the parent.

== Democratic Party of Georgia ==
Esteves was elected as the treasurer of the Democratic Party of Georgia in 2019, a position that he occupied until 2025.

After the first 2024 election debate, Esteves continued to back Joe Biden's re-election campaign. He endorsed Kamala Harris after Biden dropped out.

== 2026 Georgia gubernatorial campaign ==
In 2025, Esteves announced his candidacy in the Democratic primary for the 2026 Georgia gubernatorial election. He resigned from the Georgia Senate on September 10, 2025, in order to focus on his campaign.

== Personal life ==
He met his wife, Ariel, while he was attending Emory University School of Law. Ariel is a nurse practitioner. They own several small businesses across the state, including an urgent and primary care clinic in Atlanta and The Flying Biscuit in Columbus and Macon. They were married in Atlanta in 2012 and have two children, Jaeden and Zoe. Esteves is Catholic.

Since his mother Linda's diagnosis with Alzheimer's disease, Jason and Ariel have served as her caregivers.

== Awards ==
In 2014, Esteves was recognized by Georgia Trend as one of the most outstanding Georgians under 40. In 2017, Esteves was included on the Atlanta Business Chronicle 40 under 40 list.

In 2019, he was recognized at the ADL Southeast Jurisprudence Luncheon. He was also placed on the top 50 most influential Latinos in Georgia by the Georgia Chamber of Commerce.

== Electoral history ==
Georgia House

2012 Georgia House District 53 Democratic Primary
Party	Candidate	Votes	%
Democratic	Shelia Jones (Incumbent)	3,562	64.79%
Democratic	Jason Esteves	1,624	29.54%
Democratic	Robert Patillo	312	5.67%
Total votes		5,498	100.0%

Atlanta Board of Education at Large

2013 Atlanta Board of Education at Large
Party	Candidate	Votes	%
Nonpartisan	Jason Esteves	13,304	34.32%
Nonpartisan	Lori James	11,909	30.72%
Nonpartisan	Sean Norman	5,029	12.97%
Nonpartisan	Ed Johnson	4,558	11.76%
Nonpartisan	Eddie Lee Brewster	3,772	9.73%
Nonpartisan	Write In	191	0.49%
Total votes		38,763	100.0%

2013 Atlanta Board of Education at Large Runoff
Party	Candidate	Votes	%
Nonpartisan	Jason Esteves	10,564	71.39%
Nonpartisan	Lori James	4,233	28.61%
Total votes		14,797	100.0%

2017 Atlanta Board of Education at Large
Party	Candidate	Votes	%
Nonpartisan	Jason Esteves (Incumbent)		100%
Total votes			100

2021 Atlanta Board of Education at Large
Party	Candidate	Votes	%
Nonpartisan	Jason Esteves (Incumbent)	42,307	61.38%
Nonpartisan	Jason B Allen	16,588	24.07%
Nonpartisan	D'Jaris James	10,029	14.55%
Total votes		68,924	100.0%

Georgia Senate

2022 Georgia State Senate - District 6 Democratic Primary
Party	Candidate	Votes	%
Democratic	Jason Esteves	6,805	54.5%
Democratic	Luisa Wakeman	5,680	45.5%
Total votes		12,485	100.0%

2022 Georgia State Senate - District 6 General election
Party	Candidate	Votes	%
Democratic	Jason Esteves	45,076	56.6%
Republican	Fred Glass	34,607	43.4%
Total votes		79,683	100.0%

2024 Georgia State Senate - District 35 Primary election
Party	Candidate	Votes	%
Democratic	Jason Esteves (Incumbent)	18,265	100%
Total votes			100

2024 Georgia State Senate - District 35 General election
Party	Candidate	Votes	%
Democratic	Jason Esteves (Incumbent)		100%
Total votes		82,713	100
