= John F. Kennedy (Georgia politician) =

American politician (born 1965)

John Kennedy

President pro tempore of the Georgia State Senate
- In office January 9, 2023 – June 2, 2025
- Preceded by: Butch Miller
- Succeeded by: Larry Walker III

Member of the Georgia State Senate from the 18th district
- In office January 12, 2015 – December 8, 2025
- Preceded by: Cecil Staton
- Succeeded by: Steven McNeel

Personal details
- Born: John Flanders Kennedy; August 20, 1965 (age 61)
- Party: Republican
- Spouse: Susan Eberhardt
- Children: 2
- Education: Mercer University (BA, JD)

John Flanders Kennedy (born August 20, 1965) is an American politician. He is a former member of the Georgia State Senate from the 18th district, serving from 2015 to 2025. He is a member of the Republican Party. He bears no relations to the Boston Kennedy family.

Kennedy served as the President Pro Tempore of the Georgia State Senate from January 2023 until his announcement on June 2, 2025, that he will run for Lieutenant Governor of Georgia. Per Rule 1-1.2 (f) of the Georgia Senate, "In the event the President Pro Tempore publicly announces an intention to run for an elected office other than his or her State Senate seat, files a declaration of intention to accept campaign contributions for such office, or qualifies to run for such office, the office of the President Pro Tempore shall be deemed vacant," meaning the office is therefore vacant automatically. He resigned from the chamber in December 2025 in order to focus on his campaign.

== Electoral history and tenure ==
Kennedy was unopposed in the 2020 election, as well as the 2018 election and 2016 election.

Kennedy won reelection in 2022 with a vote share of 64.4%.

In January 2024, Kennedy co-sponsored S.B. 390, which would withhold government funding for any libraries in Georgia affiliated with the American Library Association. The bill was drafted following the election of ALA President Emily Drabinski and allegations of the organization promoting a personal ideology and influencing librarian certification.

Georgia State Senate
Preceded by Butch Miller	President pro tempore of the Georgia Senate; 2023–2025	Succeeded by Larry Walker III
