= Georgia's 53rd Senate district =

State district in Georgia, USA

Georgia's 53rd State Senate district
Senator
Lanny Thomas; R–Trion
- Demographics: 90.6% White; 4.2% Black; 2.5% Hispanic; 0.9% Asian
- Population: 173,134

District 53 of the Georgia Senate elects one member of the Georgia State Senate. It contains the entirety of Catoosa County, Chattooga County, Dade County and Walker County, as well as parts of Floyd County.

== State senators ==
- Waymond C. Huggins (1983–2001)
- Jeff Mullis (2001–2023)
- Colton Moore (2023–2026)
- Lanny Thomas (since 2026)
