= Georgia's 21st Senate district =

Georgia state senate district

Georgia's 21st State Senate district
Senator
Jason Dickerson; R–Canton
- Demographics: 71.13% White; 6.52% Black; 10.13% Hispanic; 7.38% Asian; 0.19% Native American; 0.04% Hawaiian/Pacific Islander; 0.53% Other; 5.41% Multiracial
- Population (2020) • Voting age: 192,572; 145,120

District 21 of the Georgia Senate is located in Metro Atlanta.

The district includes northern and eastern Cherokee and North Fulton counties. Cities include parts of Alpharetta, Canton, Roswell, Milton, and Woodstock.

The current senator is Jason Dickerson, a Republican from Canton first elected in a special election in 2025.

== Senators ==
- Robert Lamutt (until 2002)
- Chip Rogers (2003–2012)
- Brandon Beach (2013–2025)
- Jason Dickerson (since 2025)
