= Georgia's 7th Senate district =

American legislative district

Georgia's 7th State Senate district
Senator
Adrienne White; D–Duluth
- Demographics: 35.09% White; 20.08% Black; 18.57% Hispanic; 21.67% Asian; 0.16% Native American; 0.04% Hawaiian/Pacific Islander; 0.66% Other; 4.79% Multiracial
- Population (2020) • Voting age: 189,709; 147,425

District 7 of the Georgia Senate is a senatorial district located in northeastern Metro Atlanta.

The district, located entirely within Gwinnett County, includes Berkeley Lake and Duluth, as well as parts of Lawrenceville, Norcross, Peachtree Corners, and Suwanee.

The current senator is Adrienne White, a Democrat from Duluth first elected in 2026.

== Senators from the 7th district ==
- Greg Goggans January 10, 2005 – January 14, 2013 — Republican
- Tyler Harper January 14, 2013 – January 9, 2023 — Republican
- Nabilah Islam January 9, 2023 – March 13, 2026 – Democratic
- Adrienne White June 26, 2026 - present - Democratic
