= Georgia's 12th Senate district =

American legislative district

Georgia's 12th State Senate district
Senator
| Freddie Powell Sims; D–Dawson |
- Demographics: 33.83% White; 58.82% Black; 3.89% Hispanic; 0.86% Asian; 0.16% Native American; 0.02% Hawaiian/Pacific Islander; 0.21% Other; 2.82% Multiracial
- Population (2020) • Voting age: 190,819; 149,154

District 12 of the Georgia Senate is a district in Southwest Georgia anchored in Albany.

The district includes all of Baker, Calhoun, Clay, Dougherty, Early, Miller, Mitchell, Quitman, Randolph, Stewart, Sumter, Terrell, and Webster counties. Cities in the district include Albany, Americus, and Camilla. The Jimmy Carter National Historical Park is located in this district in Plains.

The current senator is Freddie Powell Sims, a Democrat from Dawson first elected in 2008.
