= Georgia's 45th Senate district =

State district in Georgia, USA

Georgia's 45th State Senate district
Senator
Clint Dixon; R–Buford
- Demographics: 56.2% White; 16.2% Black; 14.2% Hispanic; 10.9% Asian
- Population: 192,842

District 45 of the Georgia Senate elects one member of the Georgia State Senate. It contains parts of Barrow and Gwinnett counties.

== State senators ==
- Bob Guhl (until 2003)
- Renee Unterman (2003–2021)
- Clint Dixon (since 2021)
