= Georgia's 10th Senate district =

American legislative district

Georgia's 10th State Senate district
Senator
Emanuel Jones; D–Decatur
- Demographics: 23.46% White; 63.28% Black; 5.42% Hispanic; 3.58% Asian; 0.17% Native American; 0.03% Hawaiian/Pacific Islander; 0.62% Other; 4.37% Multiracial
- Population (2020) • Voting age: 192,983; 152,681

District 10 of the Georgia Senate is a senatorial district located in eastern and southeastern Metro Atlanta.

The district includes parts of DeKalb and Henry counties, including Avondale Estates, Belvedere Park, Candler-McAfee, Conley, Ellenwood, North Decatur, North Druid Hills, Panthersville, Rex, Scottdale, Stockbridge, and Stonecrest. The district does not include any part of Decatur proper, but it does include several large areas of south DeKalb County with Decatur addresses.

The current senator is Emanuel Jones, a Democrat from Decatur first elected in 2004.
