= Georgia's 37th Senate district =

Georgia's 37th State Senate district
Senator
Ed Setzler; R–Acworth
- Demographics: 62.38% White; 18.04% Black; 9.99% Hispanic; 3.85% Asian; 0.16% Native American; 0.03% Hawaiian/Pacific Islander; 0.78% Other; 6.21% Multiracial
- Population (2020) • Voting age: 192,671; 147,779

District 37 of the Georgia Senate is located in northwestern Metro Atlanta.

The district includes southeastern Bartow and northwestern Cobb counties, including parts of Acworth, Allatoona, Cartersville, Emerson, Kennesaw, Lost Mountain, Powder Springs, and Marietta.

The current senator is Ed Setzler, a Republican from Acworth first elected in 2022 after previously serving in the Georgia House of Representatives.
