= Georgia's 19th Senate district =

Georgia state senate district

Georgia's 19th State Senate district
Senator
Blake Tillery; R–Vidalia
- Demographics: 61.67% White; 24.76% Black; 9.72% Hispanic; 0.58% Asian; 0.17% Native American; 0.06% Hawaiian/Pacific Islander; 0.27% Other; 3.64% Multiracial
- Population (2020) • Voting age: 192,316; 146,131

District 19 of the Georgia Senate is located in Heart of Georgia and Southeast Georgia.

The district includes Appling, Bacon, eastern Coffee, Jeff Davis, Long, Montgomery, Tattnall, Telfair, Toombs, Wayne, and Wheeler counties. The district is the home of the Vidalia onion.

The current senator is Blake Tillery, a Republican from Vidalia first elected in 2016.

== List of senators ==
- Joseph Adkins (1867–1869)
- Roy Noble (1977)
- James Ronald Walker (1977–1985)
- Walter S. Ray (1985–1997)
- Van Streat (1997–2003)
- Tommie Williams (2003–2017)
- Blake Tillery (2017–present)
