= Georgia's 48th Senate district =

State district in Georgia, USA

Georgia's 48th State Senate district
Senator
Shawn Still; R–Johns Creek
- Demographics: 42.4% White; 17.3% Black; 13.0% Hispanic; 24.3% Asian
- Population: 189,149

District 48 of the Georgia Senate elects one member of the Georgia State Senate. It contains parts of Forsyth, Fulton and Gwinnett counties.

== State senators ==
- Clint Day (until 1997)
- William M. Ray II (1997–2002)
- David Shafer (2002–2019)
- Zahra Karinshak (2019–2021)
- Michelle Au (2021–2023)
- Shawn Still (since 2023)
