= 2026 Georgia's 14th congressional district special election =

- March 10, 2026 (first round); April 7, 2026 (runoff)

Georgia's 14th congressional district
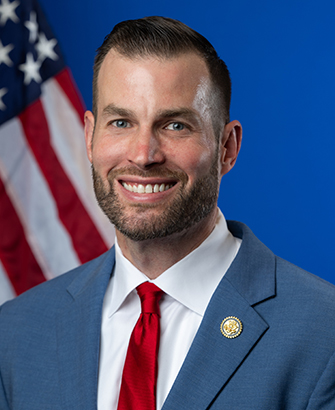

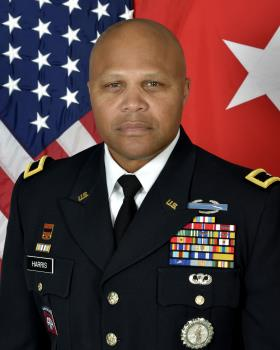

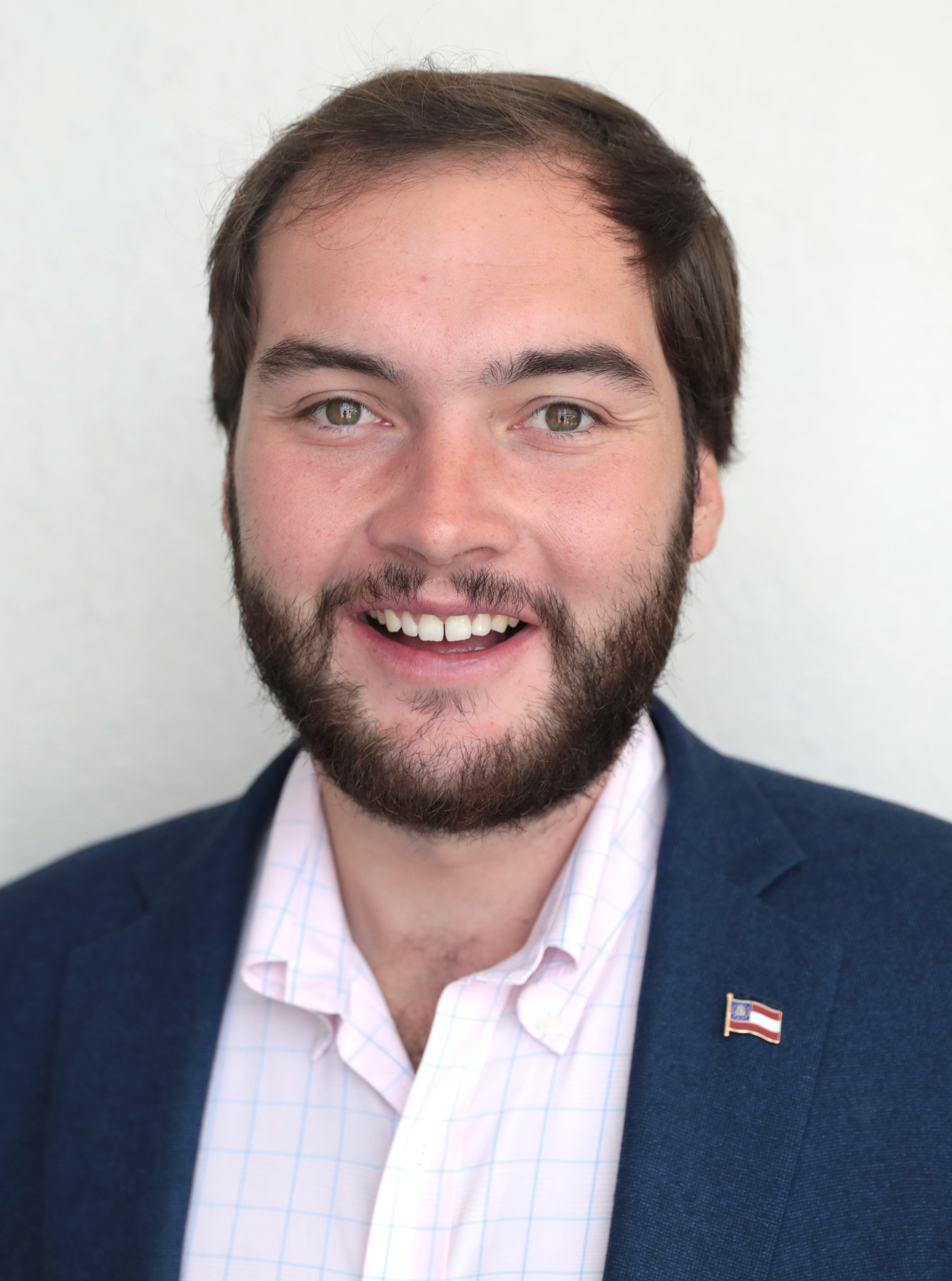
Candidate	Clay Fuller	Shawn Harris	Colton Moore
Party	Republican	Democratic	Republican
First round	40,409; 34.87%	43,273; 37.34%	13,475; 11.63%
Runoff	72,338; 55.89%	57,097; 44.11%	Eliminated
- Fuller: 30–40% 40–50% 50–60% 60–70% 70–80% 80–90% Harris: 30–40% 40–50% 50–60% 60–70% 70–80% 80–90% Moore: 30–40% 40–50% 50–60% Tie: 30–40%
U.S. Representative before election
Marjorie Taylor Greene
Republican
Elected U.S. Representative
Clay Fuller
Republican

The 2026 Georgia's 14th congressional district special election was held on March 10, 2026, to fill the vacancy in Georgia's 14th congressional district. The seat became vacant on January 5, 2026, when incumbent Marjorie Taylor Greene resigned.

Under Georgia law, all candidates appeared on one ballot in the March 10, 2026 special election. As no candidate received more than 50% of the vote, a runoff election between district attorney Clay Fuller and cattleman Shawn Harris was held on April 7, 2026, with Fuller winning to serve the remainder of the 119th United States Congress, ending January 3, 2027.

== Background ==
On November 21, 2025, Greene announced her resignation from Congress effective January 5, 2026, citing her disagreements with President Donald Trump over his handling of the Epstein files. The following day, Governor Brian Kemp scheduled a special election for March 10, 2026, with a runoff set for April 7 if no candidate received a majority of the vote.

== Candidates ==
=== Republican Party ===
==== Advanced to runoff ====
- Clay Fuller, former district attorney for the Lookout Mountain Judicial Circuit (2020–2026) and candidate for this district in 2020

==== Eliminated in first round ====
- Star Black, former Federal Emergency Management Agency official
- Reagan Box, horse trainer
- Beau Brown, risk management consultant
- Eric Cunningham, sales executive and candidate for this district in 2022
- Tom Gray, pastor and candidate for Georgia's 36th House of Representatives district in 2018
- Nicky Lama, Dalton city councilmember
- Colton Moore, state senator from the 53rd district (2023–2026)
- Brian Stover, former Paulding County commissioner
- Megahn Strickland, travel consultant
- Jim Tully, congressional staffer and chairman of the 14th district Republican Party
- Jennifer Turnipseed, farmer

==== Withdrawn ====
- Marty Brown, firefighter (running for state senate; endorsed Moore)
- Elvis Casely, entrepreneur (running for state house)
- Jared Craig, attorney and candidate for Georgia's 3rd congressional district in 2022
- Larry Hilley, self-employed
- Christian Hurd, intelligence professional (running for state house, endorsed Fuller)
- Trey Kelly, insurance consultant and former chair of the Fulton County Republican Party

==== Declined ====
- Ed Setzler, former state representative from the 35th district (2005–2023) (endorsed Gray)

=== Democratic Party ===
==== Advanced to runoff ====
- Shawn Harris, cattleman, retired brigadier general, and nominee for this district in 2024

==== Eliminated in first round ====
- Jim Davis, retired businessman
- Jonathan Hobbs, attorney

=== Libertarian Party ===
==== Eliminated in first round ====
- Andrew Underwood, candidate for Georgia's 2nd House of Representatives district in 2022

=== Independents ===
==== Eliminated in first round ====
- Rob Ruszkowski, businessman

== Special election ==
=== Endorsements ===
Clay Fuller (R)

Executive branch officials

- Donald Trump, president of the United States (2017–2021, 2025–present)

Organizations

- Club for Growth PAC
Tom Gray (R)

State legislators

- Ed Setzler, former HD-35 (2005–2023)
Shawn Harris (D)

Executive branch officials

- Pete Buttigieg, former secretary of transportation (2021–2025)

U.S. senators

- Raphael Warnock, Georgia (2021–present)

Individuals

- Samuel L. Jackson, actor
Nicky Lama (R)

State legislators

- 3 state representatives (Note: Jason Ridley, HD-06 (2017–present); Kasey Carpenter, HD-04 (2017–present); Steve Tarvin, HD-02 (2014–present))
Colton Moore (R)

U.S. representatives

- Matt Gaetz, former FL-01 (2017–2024)

State legislators

- Noelle Kahaian, HD-81 (2025–present)

Individuals

- Kyle Rittenhouse, participant in the Kenosha unrest shooting and conservative activist

Organizations

- Georgia Republican Assembly
Andrew Underwood (L)

Political parties

- Libertarian Party of Georgia

=== First round ===
==== Fundraising ====
Campaign finance reports as of February 18, 2026 (Note: All candidates with their pre-special 2026 finance report on file with the Federal Election Commission, which provides current data as of February 18, 2026.)
Candidate	Raised	Spent	Cash on hand
Shawn Harris (D)	$4,297,587.91	$4,007,837.28	$289,750.63
Rob (Rush) Ruszkowski (I)	$9,103.24	$8,522.05	$1,162.38
Andrew Paul Underwood (L)	$2,286.73	$1,406.73	$880.00
Brian C. Stover (R)	$940,141.60	$861,957.42	$78,184.18
Clay Fuller (R)	$786,797.09	$548,515.74	$238,281.35
Colton Moore (R)	$342,298.35	$271,570.32	$70,728.03
Eric B Cunningham (R)	$8,825.00	$7,207.01	$1,617.99
Jenna Jaye Turnipseed (R)	$14,307.37	$11,104.67	$3,202.70
Jim Tully (R)	$63,235.00	$16,476.55	$46,758.45
Megahn Strickland (R)	$14,580.50	$2,684.03	$11,896.47
Nicky Lama (R)	$370,341.00	$358,991.97	$21,349.03
Star Black (R)	$84,000.01	$23,727.40	$60,272.61
Thomas Jonathan Jackson Gray (R)	$300,368.88	$148,949.38	$151,419.50

==== Polling ====
Poll source	Date(s) administered	Sample size (Note: Key: A – all adults RV – registered voters LV – likely voters V – unclear)	Margin of error	Clay Fuller (R)	Nicky Lama (R)	Colton Moore (R)	Brian Stover (R)	Other	Undecided
Quantus Insights (R)	January 26, 2026	729 (RV)	–	13%	6%	13%	9%	11%	36%

==== Forum ====
2026 Georgia's 14th congressional district special election candidate forum part 1
No.	Date	Host	Moderator	Link	Republican	Republican	Democratic	Republican	Independent	Republican	Republican	Republican	Libertarian
Key: P Participant A Absent N Not invited I Invited W Withdrawn													
Key: P Participant A Absent N Not invited I Invited W Withdrawn					Star Black	Regan Box	Jim Davis	Clay Fuller	Rob Ruszkowski	Brian Stover	Megahn Strickland	Jim Tully	Andrew Underwood
1	February 16, 2026	Altanta Press Club; Georgia Public Broadcasting	Donna Lowry	YouTube	P	P	P	P	P	P	P	P	P

2026 Georgia's 14th congressional district special election candidate forum part 2
No.	Date	Host	Moderator	Link	Republican	Republican	Republican	Democratic	Democratic	Republican	Republican	Republican
Key: P Participant A Absent N Not invited I Invited W Withdrawn												
Key: P Participant A Absent N Not invited I Invited W Withdrawn					Beau Brown	Eric Cunningham	Tom Gray	Shawn Harris	Jonathan Hobbs	Nick Lama	Colton Moore	Jennifer Turnipseed
1	February 16, 2026	Altanta Press Club; Georgia Public Broadcasting	Donna Lowry	YouTube	P	P	P	P	P	P	P	P

==== Results ====
2026 Georgia's 14th congressional district special election results
Party	Candidate	Votes	%
Democratic	Shawn Harris	43,273	37.34
Republican	Clay Fuller	40,409	34.87
Republican	Colton Moore	13,475	11.63
Republican	Brian Stover	5,422	4.68
Republican	Tom Gray	4,081	3.52
Democratic	Jim Davis	1,775	1.53
Republican	Nicky Lama	1,364	1.18
Republican	Jim Tully	1,309	1.13
Democratic	Jonathan Hobbs	1,098	0.95
Republican	Beau Brown	927	0.80
Republican	Jennifer Turnipseed	633	0.55
Republican	Star Black	473	0.41
Republican	Eric Cunningham	406	0.35
Republican	Reagan Box	347	0.30
Libertarian	Andrew Underwood	321	0.28
Republican	Megahn Strickland	296	0.26
Independent	Rob Ruszkowski	281	0.24
Total votes		115,890	100.00

=== Runoff ===
==== Debate ====
2026 Georgia's 14th congressional district special election runoff debate
No.	Date	Host	Moderator	Link	Republican	Democratic
Key: P Participant A Absent N Not invited I Invited W Withdrawn						
Key: P Participant A Absent N Not invited I Invited W Withdrawn					Clay Fuller	Shawn Harris
1	March 22, 2026	Altanta Press Club; Georgia Public Broadcasting	Condace Pressley	YouTube	P	P

==== Results ====
2026 Georgia's 14th congressional district special election runoff results
Party	Candidate	Votes	%
Republican	Clay Fuller	72,338	55.89
Democratic	Shawn Harris	57,097	44.11
Total votes		129,435	100.00
Republican hold			

==== By county ====
County	Clay Fuller Republican		Shawn Harris Democratic		Margin		Total votes cast
County	#	%	#	%	#	%	Total votes cast
Catoosa	8,136	64.33%	4,511	35.67%	3,625	26.68%	12,647
Chattooga	2,546	69.81%	1,101	30.19%	1,445	39.62%	3,647
Cobb (part)	12,287	42.37%	16,715	57.63%	-4,428	-15.26%	29,002
Dade	2,007	68.80%	910	31.20%	1,097	37.60%	2,917
Floyd	9,735	56.13%	7,608	43.87%	2,127	12.26%	17,343
Murray	3,941	75.88%	1,253	24.12%	2,688	51.76%	5,194
Paulding	13,596	50.51%	13,323	49.49%	273	1.02%	26,919
Polk	4,328	69.30%	1,917	30.70%	2,411	38.60%	6,245
Walker	7,422	67.39%	3,592	32.61%	3,830	34.78%	11,014
Whitfield	8,340	57.49%	6,167	42.51%	2,173	14.98%	14,507
Totals	72,338	55.89%	57,097	44.11%	15,241	11.78%	129,435

== See also ==
- 2026 United States House of Representatives elections
- List of special elections to the United States House of Representatives
- List of United States representatives from Georgia
- 119th United States Congress
