= John Cowan (Georgia politician) =

American politician (born 1975)

Member-elect of the U.S. House of Representatives from Georgia's 11th district
- Assuming office January 3, 2027
- Succeeding: Barry Loudermilk

Personal details
- Born: John Alfred Cowan Jr. April 9, 1975 (age 51) Cartersville, Georgia, U.S.
- Party: Republican
- Spouse: Annie
- Education: Davidson College (BS); Johns Hopkins University (MD)

John Alfred Cowan Jr. (born April 9, 1975) is an American politician and neurosurgeon. A Republican, he is the member-elect for Georgia's 11th congressional district in the United States House of Representatives. He was previously a candidate for the 14th district in the 2020 House elections, but lost the primary to Marjorie Taylor Greene.

== Early life and education ==
John Cowan was born on April 9, 1975. Cowan is from Cartersville, Georgia. He graduated from Cartersville High School, and Davidson College in 1996. While at Davidson, he played college football for the Davidson Wildcats football team as a left tackle. He earned his Doctor of Medicine at the Johns Hopkins School of Medicine.

== Career ==
Cowan is a neurosurgeon from Rome, Georgia, who works at Harbin Clinic. He is also the chief executive officer of Cortex Toys, a toy distributor based in Rome.

After Tom Graves announced that he wound not seek reelection for Georgia's 14th congressional district in the United States House of Representatives in the 2020 elections, Cowan announced his candidacy to succeed him. In the nonpartisan blanket primary, Cowan received 21% of the vote, finishing in second place behind Marjorie Taylor Greene. Cowan and Greene advanced to a runoff election, which Greene won, 57% to 43%. In 2021, Cowan acknowledged that he was considering running against Greene in the 2022 elections.

In February 2026, after Barry Loudermilk announced that he would retire from the House, Cowan announced that he would run to succeed him in representing Georgia's 11th congressional district. Cowan won the nomination by defeating Rob Adkerson, Loudermilk's former chief of staff, in a runoff election. He won the November general election.

== Personal life ==
Cowan's wife, Annie is an anesthesiologist.

U.S. House of Representatives
Preceded by Barry Loudermilk	Member of the U.S. House of Representatives from Georgia's 11th congressional district Taking office 2027	Elect
