= Clay Fuller =

American politician (born 1981)

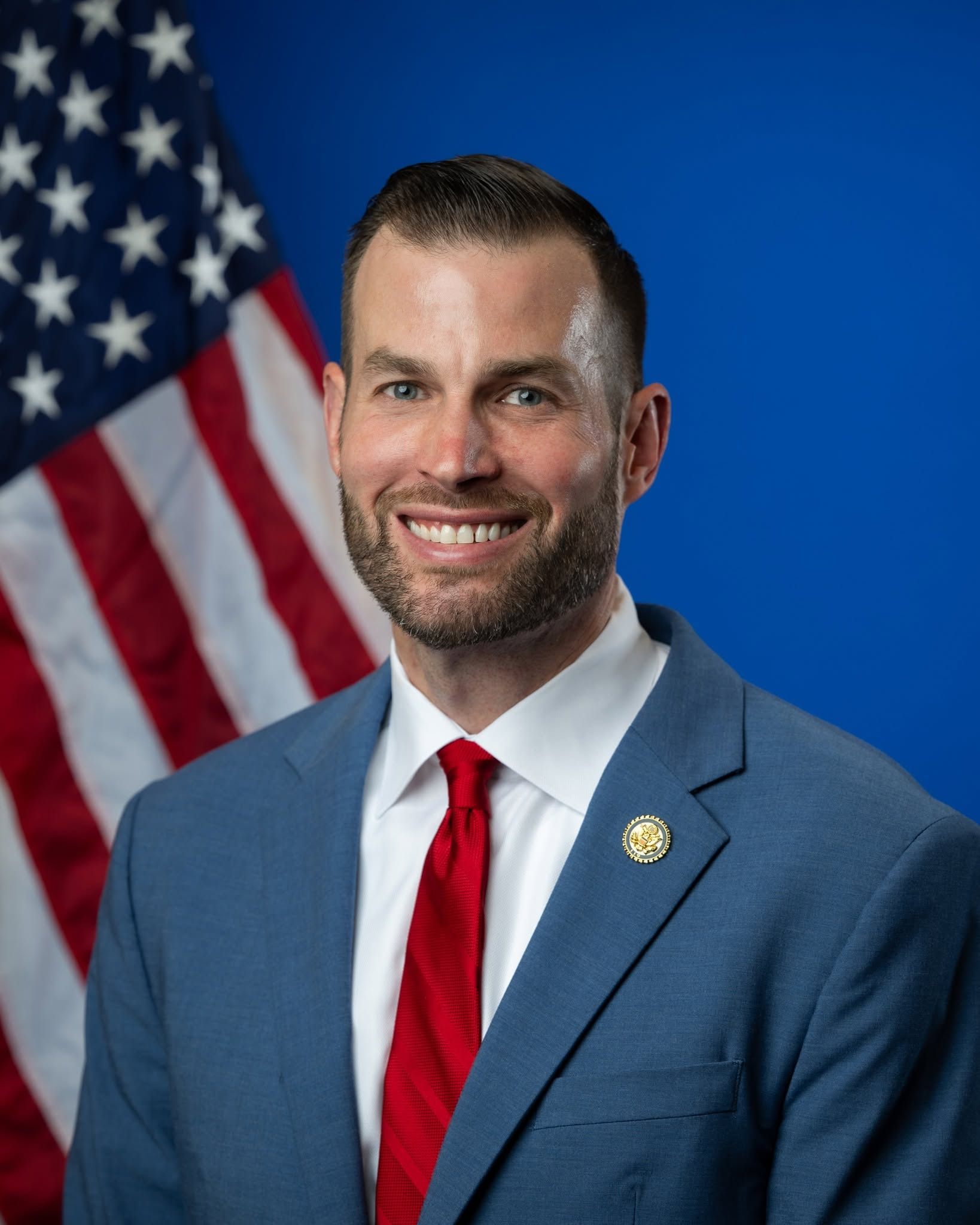
- Official portrait, 2026

Member of the U.S. House of Representatives from Georgia's 14th district
- Incumbent
- Assumed office April 14, 2026
- Preceded by: Marjorie Taylor Greene

District Attorney of Lookout Mountain Judicial Circuit
- In office March 14, 2023 – January 12, 2026
- Preceded by: Chris Arnt
- Succeeded by: Deanna Reisman

Personal details
- Born: Clayton McLean Fuller; April 9, 1981 (age 45) Brazoria, Texas, U.S.
- Party: Republican
- Spouse: Kate Manthos
- Children: 2
- Education: Florida Atlantic University (attended); Emory University (BA); Cornell University (MPA); Southern Methodist University (JD); Air University (MMAS)
- Website: House website; Campaign website

Military service
- Branch/service: United States Air Force; Air National Guard
- Years of service: 2010–2014 (Active); 2024–present (Guard)
- Rank: Lieutenant Colonel
- Unit: Georgia Air National Guard; Air Force Judge Advocate General's Corps

Clayton McLean Fuller (born April 9, 1981) is an American politician and attorney serving as the U.S. representative for Georgia's 14th congressional district since April 2026. A member of the Republican Party, he previously served as the district attorney for the Lookout Mountain Judicial Circuit from 2023 until his resignation in 2026. Fuller was first elected in a special election in April 2026 to succeed fellow Republican Marjorie Taylor Greene.

== Early life and education ==
Fuller was born in Brazoria, Texas and grew up in Helen, Georgia, coming from a family that has lived in North Georgia since the 1800s. He attended D. W. Daniel High School in South Carolina before attending a postgraduate year at Cheshire Academy in Cheshire, Connecticut, matriculating in 2000. He then attended Florida Atlantic University, before transferring to Emory University in 2002. He earned a Bachelor of Arts in English literature from Emory, a Master of Public Administration from Cornell University, and a Juris Doctor from Southern Methodist University. Fuller also graduated from the Air Force Officer Training School, Marine Expeditionary Warfare School, and received a Master of Military Art and Science from Air Command and Staff College at Air University.

== Military service ==
Fuller has served as an officer in the United States Air Force and the Georgia Air National Guard. From 2010 to 2014, he served as an officer in the United States Air Force Judge Advocate General's Corps. Afterwards, he worked for the Air National Guard where he eventually reached the rank of Lieutenant Colonel. In April 2024, he was deployed for six months in Qatar as a legal advisor to military operations in support of the United States Central Command. Fuller returned from his deployment in December 2024. He is a recipient of the Office of the Secretary of Defense's Award for Outstanding Achievement.

== Career ==
Fuller served as Assistant District Attorney for the Lookout Mountain Judicial Circuit after working in the Judge Advocate General's Corps. He was selected as a White House Fellow from 2018 to 2019 and worked in the Office of the Vice President and with the Department of Defense. In March 2023, he was appointed by Governor Brian Kemp to serve as District Attorney for the Lookout Mountain Judicial Circuit. He resigned from this position effective January 12, 2026, to run for office to the United States House of Representatives.

== U.S. House of Representatives ==
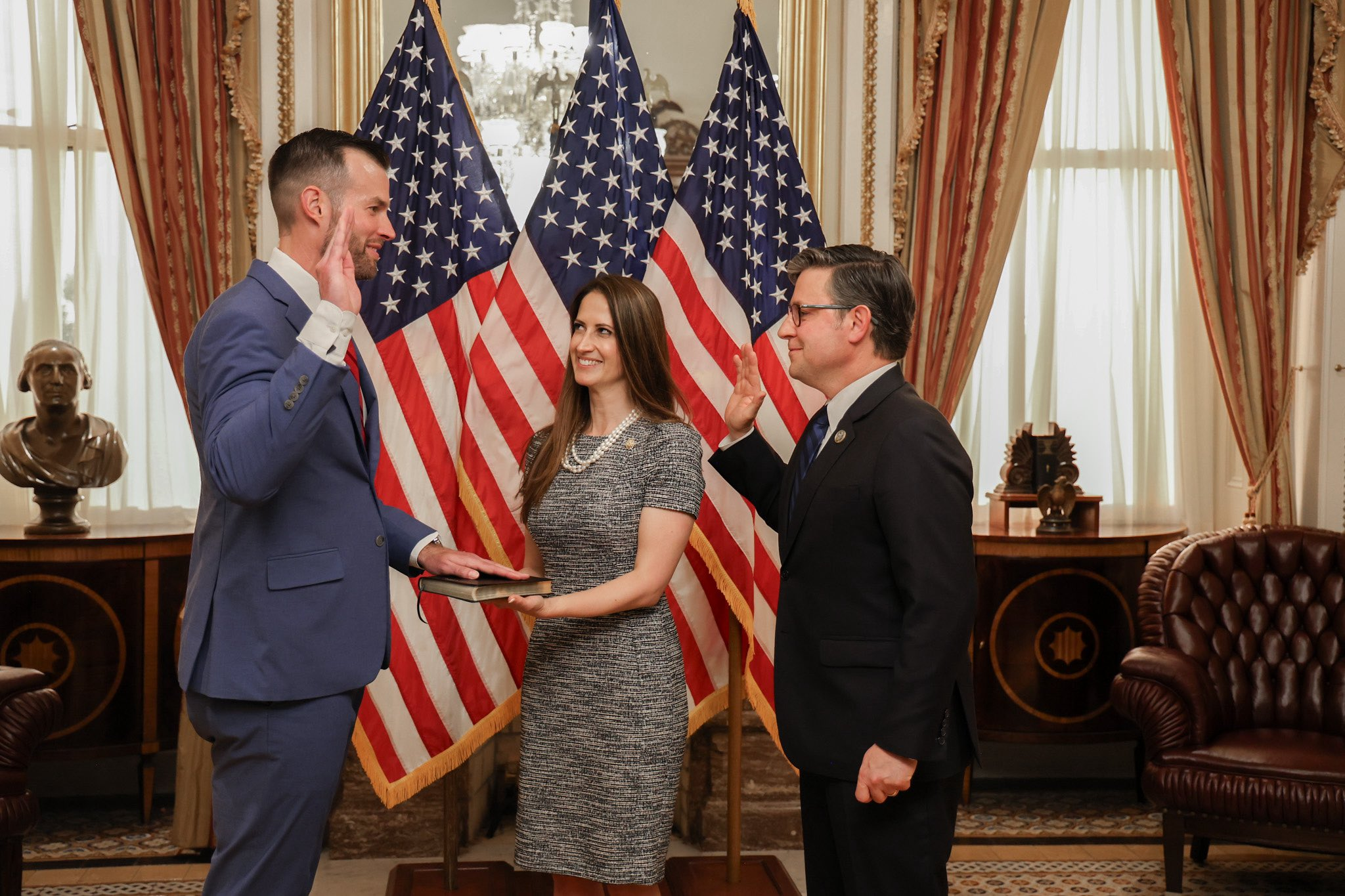
Fuller being sworn in by Speaker Mike Johnson (right) as his wife looks on

Fuller first ran for the US House in 2020. He placed 4th in the GA-14 Republican primary.

In 2026, Fuller ran for the open seat for Georgia's 14th congressional district in the United States House of Representatives made vacant after the resignation of Marjorie Taylor Greene. He received the endorsement of President Donald Trump. He defeated Democratic challenger Shawn Harris on April 7 in the special election.

=== Committee assignments ===
- Committee on Small Business
  - Innovation, Entrepreneurship, and Workforce Development Subcommittee
  - Oversight, Investigations, and Regulations Subcommittee
- Committee on Transportation and Infrastructure

== Personal life ==
Fuller met his wife Kate Manthos at Cornell University, and they have a son and a daughter.

== Electoral history ==
2026 Georgia's 14th congressional district special election
| Party | Candidate | Votes | % |
|---|---|---|---|
| Democratic | Shawn Harris | 43,273 | 37.34 |
| Republican | Clay Fuller | 40,409 | 34.87 |
| Republican | Colton Moore | 13,475 | 11.63 |
| Republican | Brian Stover | 5,422 | 4.68 |
| Republican | Tom Gray | 4,081 | 3.52 |
| Democratic | Jim Davis | 1,775 | 1.53 |
| Republican | Nicky Lama | 1,364 | 1.18 |
| Republican | Jim Tully | 1,309 | 1.13 |
| Democratic | Jonathan Hobbs | 1,098 | 0.95 |
| Republican | Beau Brown | 927 | 0.80 |
| Republican | Jennifer Turnipseed | 633 | 0.55 |
| Republican | Star Black | 473 | 0.41 |
| Republican | Eric Cunningham | 406 | 0.35 |
| Republican | Reagan Box | 347 | 0.30 |
| Libertarian | Andrew Underwood | 321 | 0.28 |
| Republican | Megahn Strickland | 296 | 0.26 |
| Independent | Rob Ruszkowski | 281 | 0.24 |
| Total votes | | 115,890 | 100.00 |
Runoff election
| Republican | Clay Fuller | 72,304 | 55.90 |
| Democratic | Shawn Harris | 57,030 | 44.10 |
| Total votes | | 129,334 | 100.00 |

2026 Georgia's 14th congressional district Republican primary
| Party | Candidate | Votes | % |
|---|---|---|---|
| Republican | Clay Fuller (incumbent) | 66,888 | 81.3 |
| Republican | Colton Moore | 5,508 | 6.7 |
| Republican | Brian Stover | 3,191 | 3.9 |
| Republican | Tom Gray | 2,044 | 2.5 |
| Republican | Timothy Brown | 1,489 | 1.8 |
| Republican | Star Black | 1,406 | 1.7 |
| Republican | Nicky Lama | 1,220 | 1.5 |
| Republican | Reagan Box | 560 | 0.7 |
| Total votes | | 82,306 | 100.0 |

U.S. House of Representatives
| Preceded by Marjorie Taylor Greene | Member of the U.S. House of Representatives from Georgia's 14th congressional district 2026–present | Incumbent |
U.S. order of precedence (ceremonial)
| Preceded by Christian Menefee | United States representatives by seniority 429th | Succeeded by Analilia Mejia |
