= 2020 United States House of Representatives elections in Georgia =

- November 3, 2020

All 14 Georgia seats to the United States House of Representatives
- Turnout: 67.51% ▲8.37 pp
	Majority party	Minority party
Party	Republican	Democratic
Last election	9	5
Seats won	8	6
Seat change	▼1	▲1
Popular vote	2,490,396	2,393,089
Percentage	51.00%	49.00%
Swing	▼1.27%	▲1.27%

Republican hold
Democratic hold Democratic gain
Republican
50–60%
60–70%
70–80%
80–90%
>90%
Democratic
50–60%
60–70%
70–80%
80–90%

The 2020 United States House of Representatives elections in Georgia were held on November 3, 2020, to elect the 14 U.S. representatives from the state of Georgia, one from each of the state's 14 congressional districts. The elections coincided with the 2020 U.S. presidential election, as well as other elections to the House of Representatives, elections to the United States Senate and various state and local elections.

Primaries were held on June 9, 2020, coinciding with primaries for U.S. president, U.S. Senate, General Assembly, county and regional prosecutorial offices as well as local non-partisan elections. It was the first time since 1994 that both major parties contested all congressional districts in the state, even though the Democratic nominee for the 14th district had suspended his campaign prior to the general election; it was also the first time since 2012 that Republicans contested all districts, as it was for Democrats for the first time since 2008.

== Overview ==
District	Republican		Democratic		Total		Result
District	Votes	%	Votes	%	Votes	%	Result
District 1	189,457	58.35%	135,238	41.65%	324,695	100.0%	Republican hold
District 2	111,620	40.88%	161,397	59.12%	273,017	100.0%	Democratic hold
District 3	241,526	65.05%	129,792	34.95%	371,318	100.0%	Republican hold
District 4	69,393	19.92%	278,906	80.08%	348,299	100.0%	Democratic hold
District 5	52,646	14.85%	301,857	85.15%	354,503	100.0%	Democratic hold
District 6	180,329	45.41%	216,775	54.59%	397,104	100.0%	Democratic hold
District 7	180,564	48.61%	190,900	51.39%	371,464	100.0%	Democratic gain
District 8	198,701	64.52%	109,264	35.48%	307,965	100.0%	Republican hold
District 9	292,750	78.58%	79,797	21.42%	372,547	100.0%	Republican hold
District 10	235,810	62.31%	142,636	37.69%	378,446	100.0%	Republican hold
District 11	245,259	60.43%	160,623	39.57%	405,882	100.0%	Republican hold
District 12	181,038	58.49%	129,061	41.69%	309,544	100.0%	Republican hold
District 13	81,476	22.60%	279,045	77.40%	360,521	100.0%	Democratic hold
District 14	229,827	74.71%	77,798	25.29%	307,625	100.0%	Republican hold
Total	2,490,393	51.00%	2,393,089	49.00%	4,882,930	100.0%	

Popular vote
Republican	51.00%
Democratic	49.00%

House seats
Republican	57.14%
Democratic	42.86%

== District 1 ==
2020 Georgia's 1st congressional district election
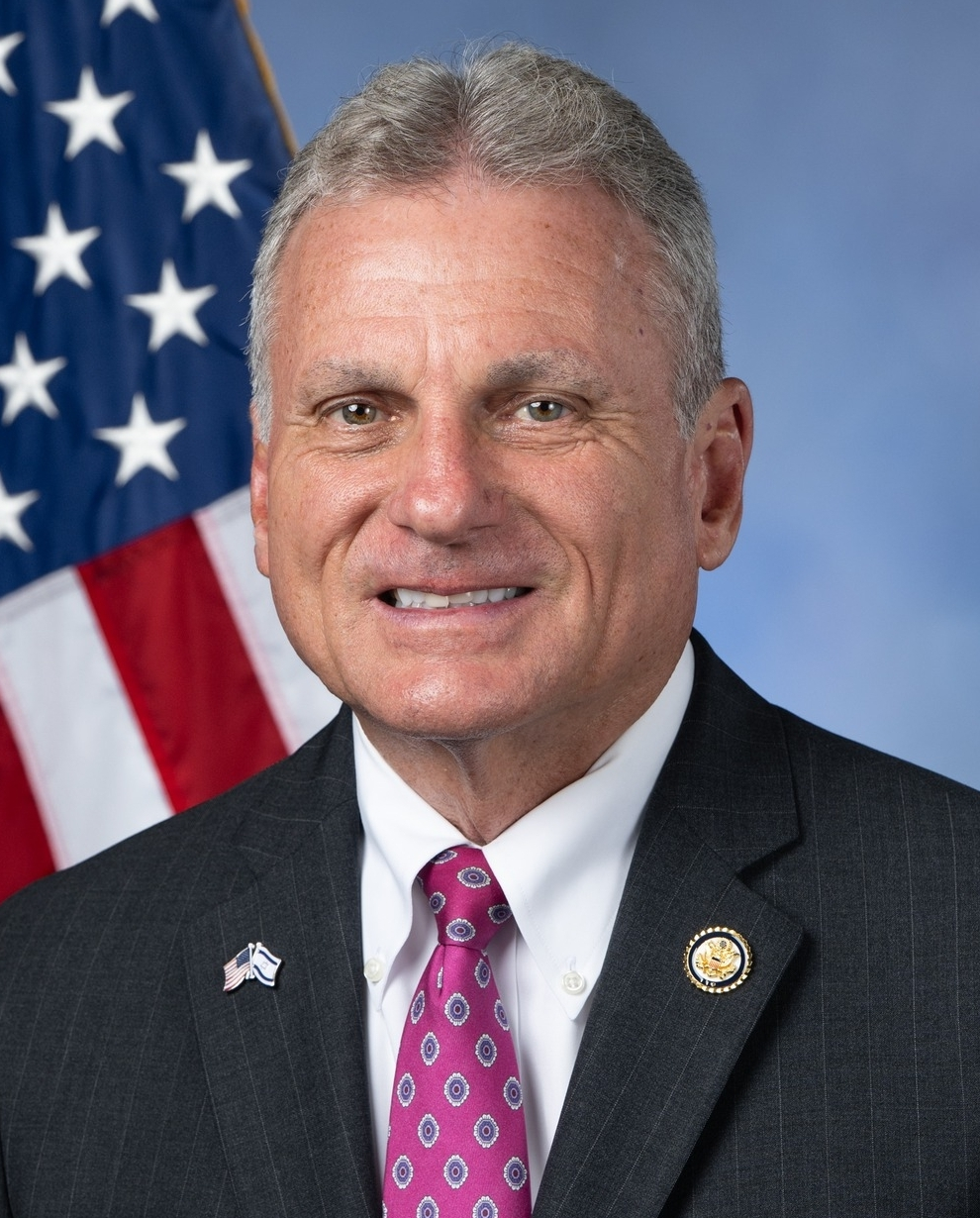

Nominee	Buddy Carter	Joyce Griggs
Party	Republican	Democratic
Popular vote	189,457	135,238
Percentage	58.3%	41.7%
- Carter: 50–60% 60–70% 70–80% 80–90% >90% Griggs: 50–60% 60–70% 70–80% 80–90% >90% No votes
U.S. Representative before election
Buddy Carter
Republican
Elected U.S. Representative
Buddy Carter
Republican

The 1st district comprises the entire coastal area of Sea Islands and much of the southeastern part of the state. In addition to Savannah, the district includes the cities of Brunswick, Jesup, and Waycross. The incumbent was Republican Buddy Carter, who was re-elected with 57.7% of the vote in 2018.

=== Republican primary ===
==== Candidates ====
===== Declared =====
- Buddy Carter, incumbent U.S. representative
- Daniel Merritt, businessman and U.S. Army veteran
- Ken Yasger, U.S. Army veteran

==== Endorsements ====
Buddy Carter
- Donald Trump, 45th president of the United States

==== Primary results ====
Republican primary results
Party	Candidate	Votes	%
Republican	Buddy Carter (incumbent)	65,907	82.2
Republican	Daniel Merritt	13,154	16.4
Republican	Ken Yasger	1,153	1.4
Total votes		80,214	100.0

=== Democratic primary ===
==== Candidates ====
===== Declared =====
- Joyce Griggs, retired lieutenant colonel and businesswoman
- Lisa Ring, chairwoman of the Bryan County Democratic Party and nominee for Georgia's 1st congressional district in 2018
- Barbara Seidman, retired businesswoman

==== Primary results ====
Democratic primary results
Party	Candidate	Votes	%
Democratic	Lisa Ring	28,916	46.0
Democratic	Joyce Griggs	25,593	40.7
Democratic	Barbara Seidman	8,337	13.3
Total votes		62,846	100.0

==== Runoff results ====
Democratic primary runoff results
Party	Candidate	Votes	%
Democratic	Joyce Griggs	15,958	55.9
Democratic	Lisa Ring	12,594	44.1
Total votes		28,552	100.0

=== General election ===
==== Predictions ====
Source	Ranking	As of
The Cook Political Report	Safe R	July 2, 2020
Inside Elections	Safe R	June 2, 2020
Sabato's Crystal Ball	Safe R	July 2, 2020
Politico	Safe R	April 19, 2020
Daily Kos	Safe R	June 3, 2020
RCP	Safe R	June 9, 2020
Niskanen	Safe R	June 7, 2020

==== Results ====
Georgia's 1st congressional district, 2020
Party	Candidate	Votes	%
Republican	Buddy Carter (incumbent)	189,457	58.3
Democratic	Joyce Griggs	135,238	41.7
Total votes		324,695	100.0
Republican hold			

== District 2 ==
2020 Georgia's 2nd congressional district election
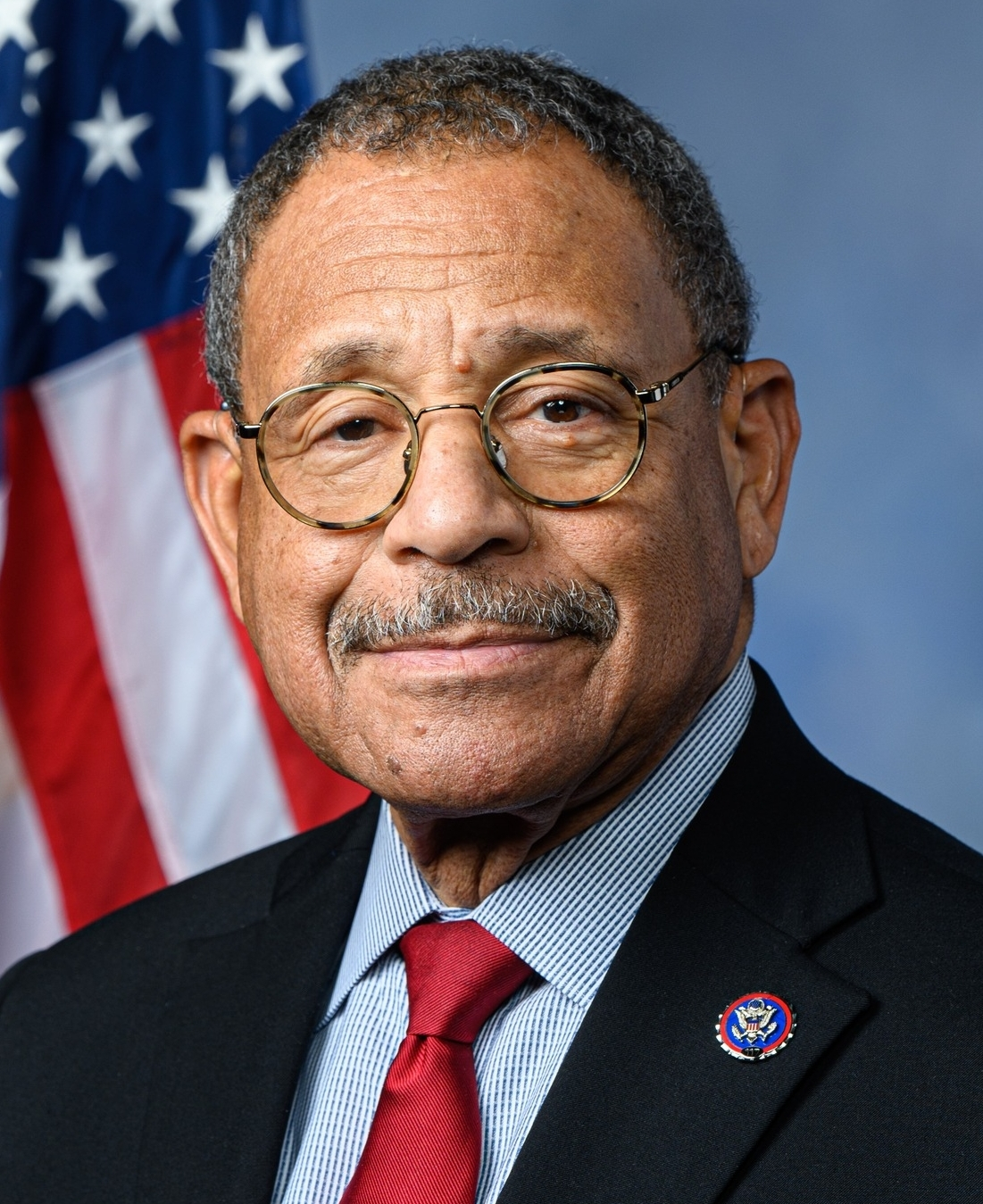

Nominee	Sanford Bishop	Don Cole
Party	Democratic	Republican
Popular vote	161,397	111,620
Percentage	59.1%	40.9%
- Bishop: 50–60% 60–70% 70–80% 80–90% >90% Cole: 50–60% 60–70% 70–80% 80–90% >90% No votes
U.S. Representative before election
Sanford Bishop
Democratic
Elected U.S. Representative
Sanford Bishop
Democratic

The 2nd district encompasses rural southwestern Georgia, taking in Macon, Albany, and Columbus. The incumbent was Democrat Sanford Bishop, who was re-elected with 59.7% of the vote in 2018.

=== Democratic primary ===
==== Candidates ====
===== Declared =====
- Sanford Bishop, incumbent U.S. representative

==== Primary results ====
Democratic primary results
Party	Candidate	Votes	%
Democratic	Sanford Bishop (incumbent)	82,964	100.0
Total votes		82,964	100.0

=== Republican primary ===
==== Candidates ====
===== Declared =====
- Vivian Childs, businesswoman and former educator
- Don Cole, former speechwriter for U.S. Agriculture Secretary Sonny Perdue

==== Primary results ====
Republican primary results
Party	Candidate	Votes	%
Republican	Don Cole	23,528	53.4
Republican	Vivian Childs	20,522	46.6
Total votes		44,050	100.0

=== General election ===
==== Predictions ====
Source	Ranking	As of
The Cook Political Report	Safe D	July 2, 2020
Inside Elections	Safe D	June 2, 2020
Sabato's Crystal Ball	Safe D	July 2, 2020
Politico	Likely D	October 11, 2020
Daily Kos	Safe D	June 3, 2020
RCP	Safe D	June 9, 2020
Niskanen	Safe D	June 7, 2020

==== Results ====
Georgia's 2nd congressional district, 2020
Party	Candidate	Votes	%
Democratic	Sanford Bishop (incumbent)	161,397	59.1
Republican	Don Cole	111,620	40.9
Total votes		273,017	100.0
Democratic hold			

== District 3 ==
2020 Georgia's 3rd congressional district election
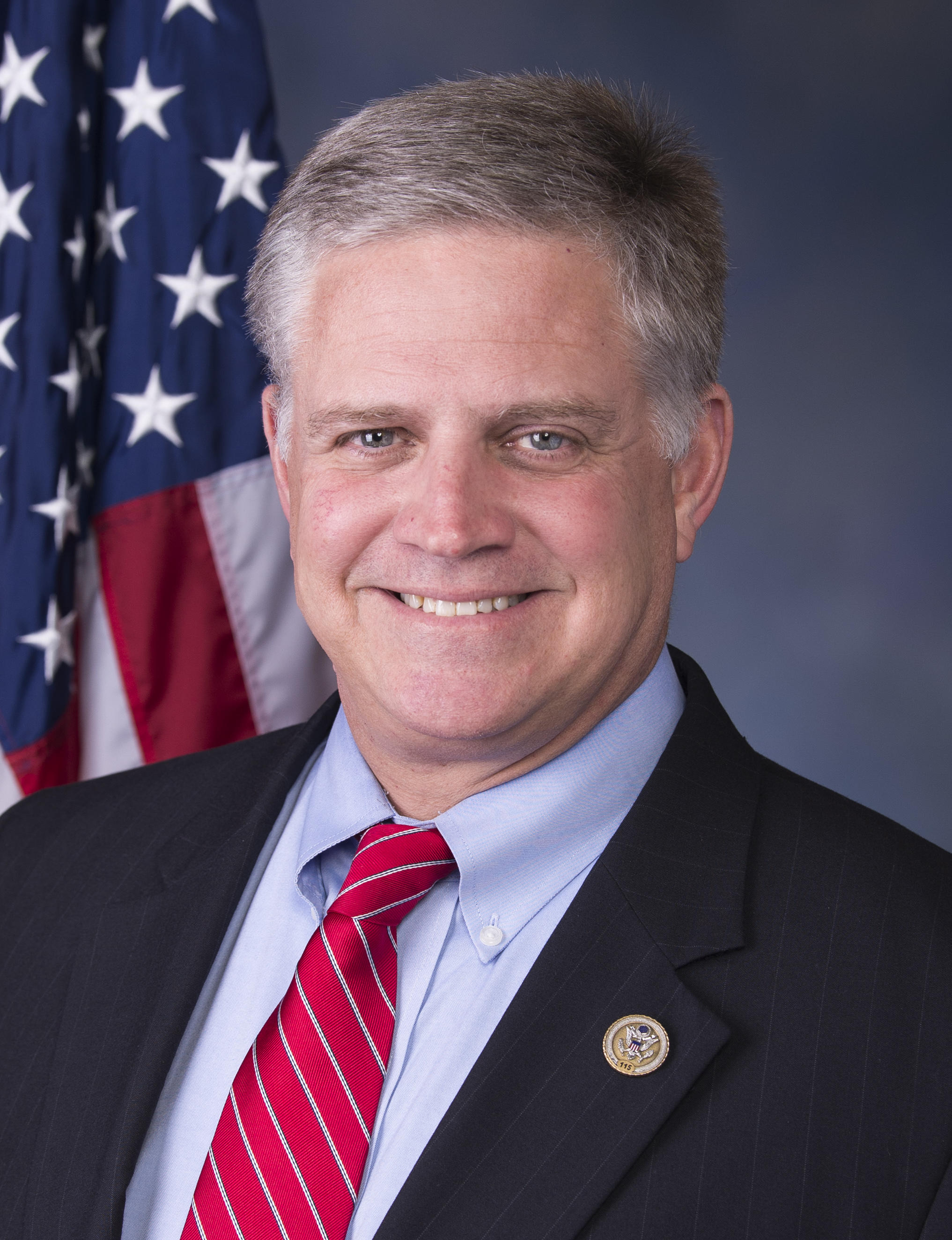

Nominee	Drew Ferguson	Val Almonord
Party	Republican	Democratic
Popular vote	241,526	129,792
Percentage	65.1%	34.9%
- Ferguson: 50–60% 60–70% 70–80% 80–90% >90% Almonord: 50–60% 60–70% 70–80% 80–90%
U.S. Representative before election
Drew Ferguson
Republican
Elected U.S. Representative
Drew Ferguson
Republican

The third district takes in the southwestern exurbs of Atlanta, including Coweta County and parts of Fayette County. The incumbent was Republican Drew Ferguson, who was re-elected with 65.5% of the vote in 2018.

=== Republican primary ===
==== Candidates ====
===== Declared =====
- Drew Ferguson, incumbent U.S. representative

==== Primary results ====
Republican primary results
Party	Candidate	Votes	%
Republican	Drew Ferguson (incumbent)	94,166	100.0
Total votes		94,166	100.0

=== Democratic primary ===
==== Candidates ====
===== Declared =====
- Val Almonord, retired physician

=== Primary results ===
Democratic primary results
Party	Candidate	Votes	%
Democratic	Val Almonord	56,240	100.0
Total votes		56,240	100.0

=== General election ===
==== Predictions ====
Source	Ranking	As of
The Cook Political Report	Safe R	July 2, 2020
Inside Elections	Safe R	June 2, 2020
Sabato's Crystal Ball	Safe R	July 2, 2020
Politico	Safe R	April 19, 2020
Daily Kos	Safe R	June 3, 2020
RCP	Safe R	June 9, 2020
Niskanen	Safe R	June 7, 2020

==== Results ====
Georgia's 3rd congressional district, 2020
Party	Candidate	Votes	%
Republican	Drew Ferguson (incumbent)	241,526	65.1
Democratic	Val Almonord	129,792	34.9
Total votes		371,318	100.0
Republican hold			

== District 4 ==
2020 Georgia's 4th congressional district election
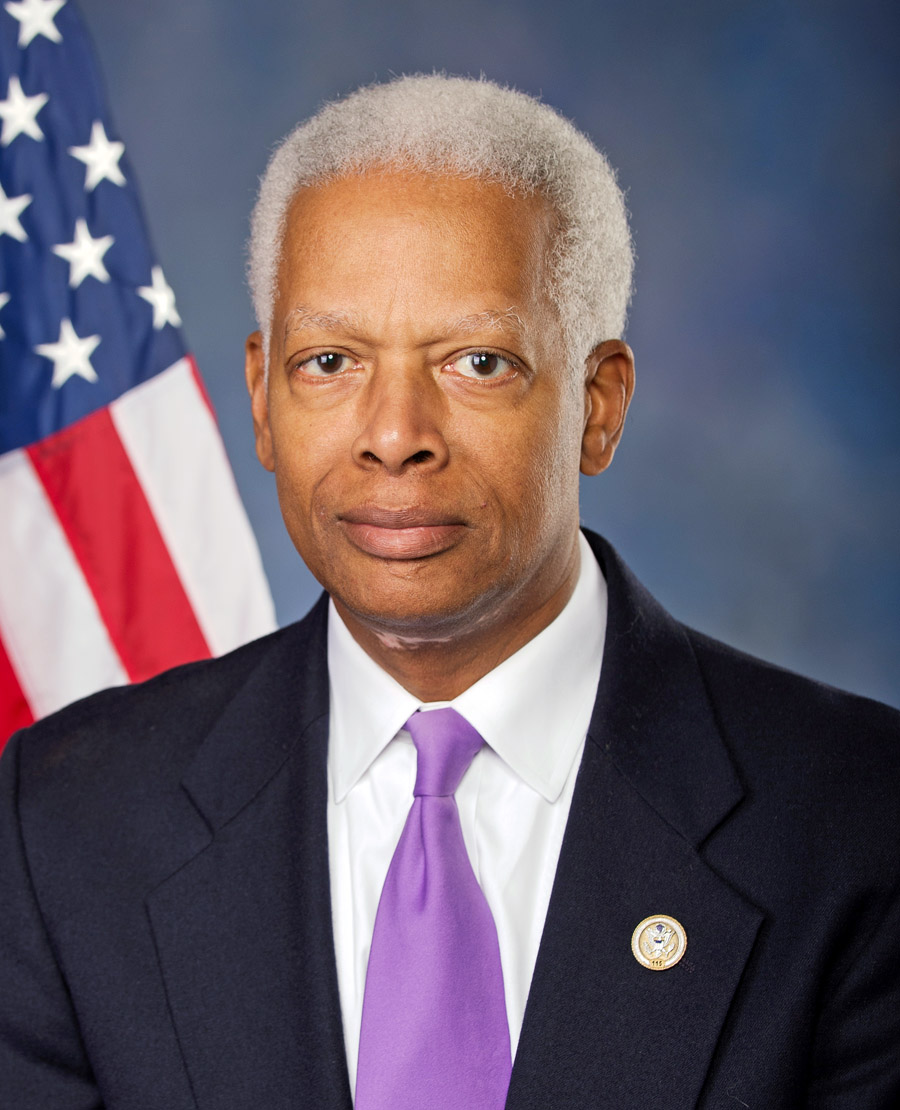

Nominee	Hank Johnson	Johsie Cruz Ezammudeen
Party	Democratic	Republican
Popular vote	278,906	69,393
Percentage	80.1%	19.9%
- Johnson: 50–60% 60–70% 70–80% 80–90% >90% Ezammudeen: 50–60% 60–70% No votes
U.S. Representative before election
Hank Johnson
Democratic
Elected U.S. Representative
Hank Johnson
Democratic

The 4th district encompasses the eastern suburbs of Atlanta, taking in Conyers, Covington, Decatur, Lilburn, and Lithonia. The incumbent was Democrat Hank Johnson, who was re-elected with 78.9% of the vote in 2018.

=== Democratic primary ===
==== Candidates ====
===== Declared =====
- William Haston, contractor
- Hank Johnson, incumbent U.S. representative
- Elaine Amankwah Nietmann, attorney

==== Endorsements ====
Hank Johnson

Organizations

- Humane Society of the United States Legislative Fund
- National Education Association
- Peace Action
- Planned Parenthood Action Fund
- Sierra Club

==== Primary results ====
Democratic primary results
Party	Candidate	Votes	%
Democratic	Hank Johnson (incumbent)	102,227	68.4
Democratic	Elaine Nietman	27,376	18.3
Democratic	William Haston	19,829	13.3
Total votes		149,423	100.0

=== Republican primary ===
==== Candidates ====
===== Declared =====
- Johsie Cruz Ezammudeen, activist

==== Primary results ====
Republican primary results
Party	Candidate	Votes	%
Republican	Johsie Cruz Ezammudeen	23,115	100.0
Total votes		23,115	100.0

=== General election ===
==== Predictions ====
Source	Ranking	As of
The Cook Political Report	Safe D	July 2, 2020
Inside Elections	Safe D	June 2, 2020
Sabato's Crystal Ball	Safe D	July 2, 2020
Politico	Safe D	April 19, 2020
Daily Kos	Safe D	June 3, 2020
RCP	Safe D	June 9, 2020
Niskanen	Safe D	June 7, 2020

==== Results ====
Georgia's 4th congressional district, 2020
Party	Candidate	Votes	%
Democratic	Hank Johnson (incumbent)	278,906	80.1
Republican	Johsie Cruz Ezammudeen	69,393	19.9
Total votes		348,299	100.0
Democratic hold			

== District 5 ==
2020 Georgia's 5th congressional district election
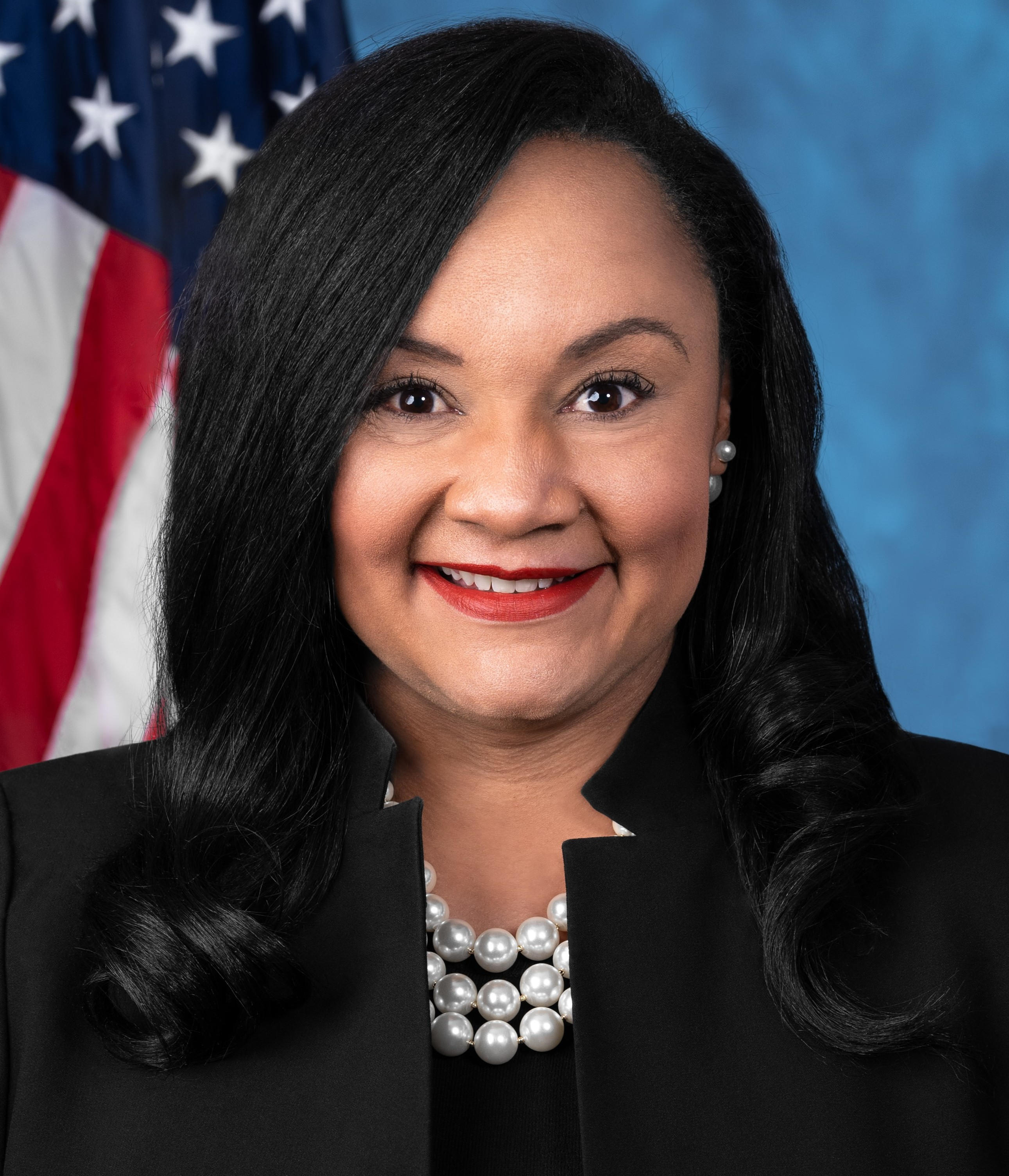

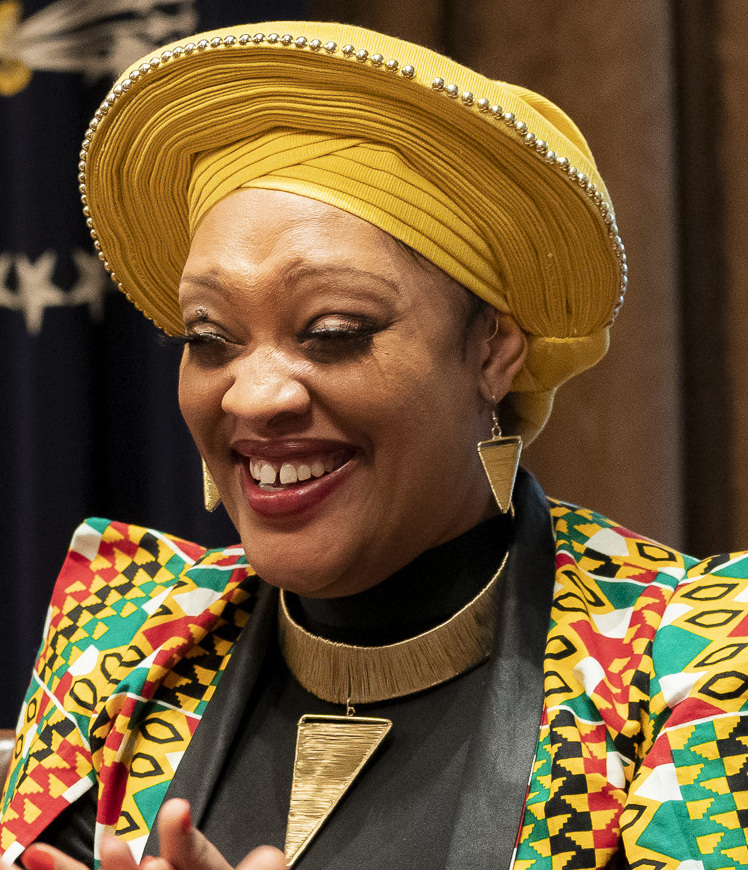
Nominee	Nikema Williams	Angela Stanton-King
Party	Democratic	Republican
Popular vote	301,857	52,646
Percentage	85.2%	14.8%
- Williams: 50–60% 60–70% 70–80% 80–90% >90% Stanton-King: 50–60% 60–70% >90% Tie: 50% No votes
U.S. Representative before election
Vacant
Elected U.S. Representative
Nikema Williams
Democratic

The 5th district is centered on Downtown Atlanta. Incumbent Democrat John Lewis initially ran for re-election to an eighteenth term before he died in office on July 17, 2020. A special election was held on September 29, 2020, which advanced to a runoff scheduled for December 1. As a result, the seat was vacant before the general election. Democrat Kwanza Hall was eventually elected in the runoff and served the remainder of Lewis's term.

=== Democratic primary ===
==== Candidates ====
===== Declared =====
- John Lewis, incumbent U.S. representative (died in office July 17, 2020)
- Barrington D. Martin II, paralegal

==== Endorsements ====
John Lewis (deceased)

Organizations

- Humane Society of the United States Legislative Fund
- NARAL Pro-Choice America
- National Education Association
- Peace Action
- Planned Parenthood Action Fund
- Sierra Club

==== Primary results ====
Democratic primary results
Party	Candidate	Votes	%
Democratic	John Lewis (incumbent)	142,541	87.6
Democratic	Barrington D. Martin II	20,096	12.4
Total votes		162,637	100.0

==== Nominating committee ====
Following Lewis's death, the Georgia Democratic Party received 131 applications for candidates to nominate, and announced five finalists:

- Park Cannon, state representative
- Andre Dickens, Atlanta city councillor
- Robert Michael Franklin Jr., former president of Morehouse College
- Nikema Williams, state senator and chair of the Georgia Democratic Party
- James Woodall, president of the Georgia NAACP

The party's 45-member executive committee selected Williams, with Cannon receiving two votes and Woodall receiving one.

=== Republican primary ===
==== Candidates ====
===== Declared =====
- Angela Stanton-King, author and criminal justice advocate

==== Primary results ====
Republican primary results
Party	Candidate	Votes	%
Republican	Angela Stanton-King	8,566	100.0
Total votes		8,566	100.0

=== General election ===
==== Predictions ====
Source	Ranking	As of
The Cook Political Report	Safe D	July 2, 2020
Inside Elections	Safe D	June 2, 2020
Sabato's Crystal Ball	Safe D	July 2, 2020
Politico	Safe D	April 19, 2020
Daily Kos	Safe D	June 3, 2020
RCP	Safe D	June 9, 2020
Niskanen	Safe D	June 7, 2020

==== Results ====
Georgia's 5th congressional district, 2020
Party	Candidate	Votes	%
Democratic	Nikema Williams	301,857	85.2
Republican	Angela Stanton-King	52,646	14.8
Total votes		354,503	100.0
Democratic hold			

== District 6 ==
2020 Georgia's 6th congressional district election
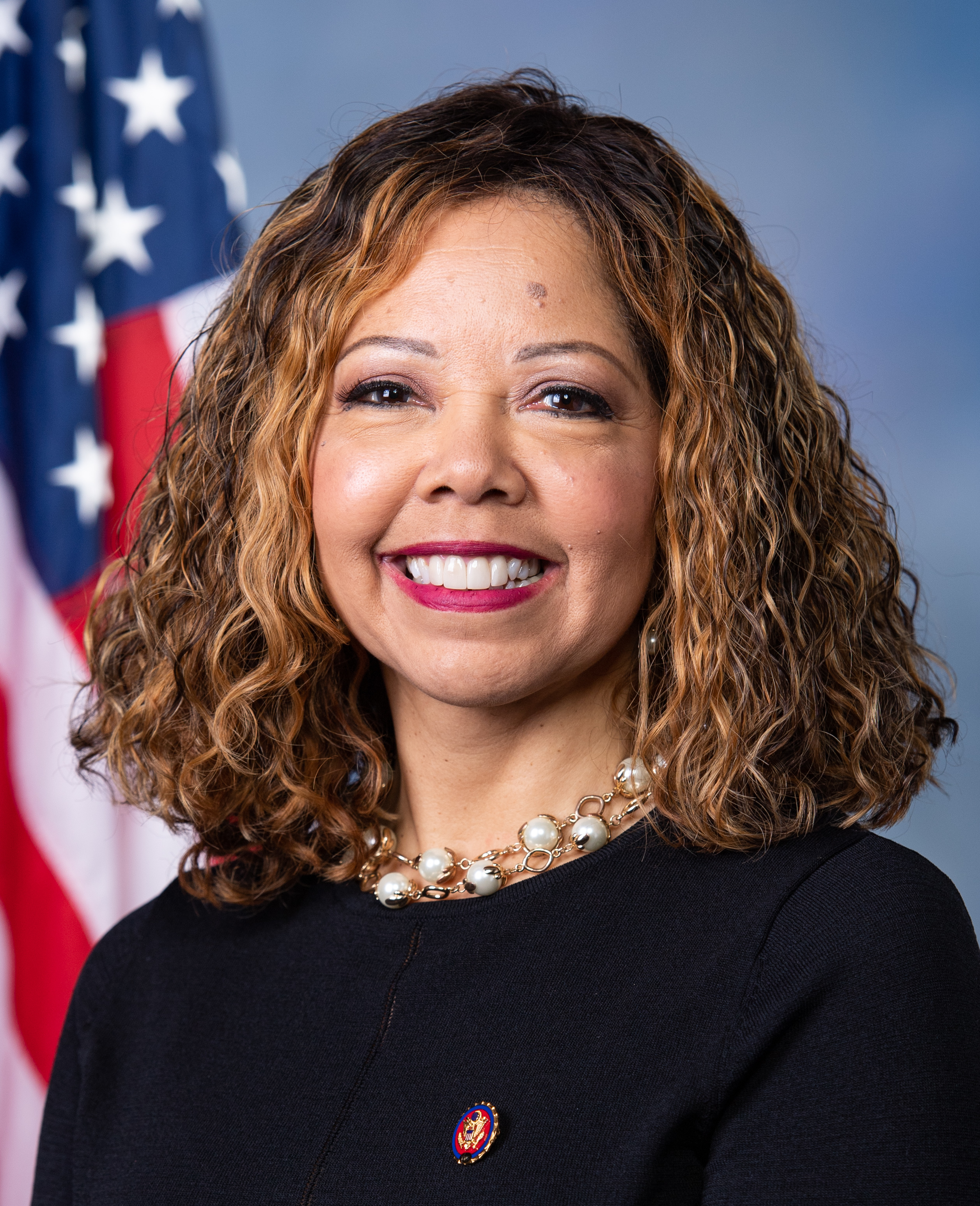

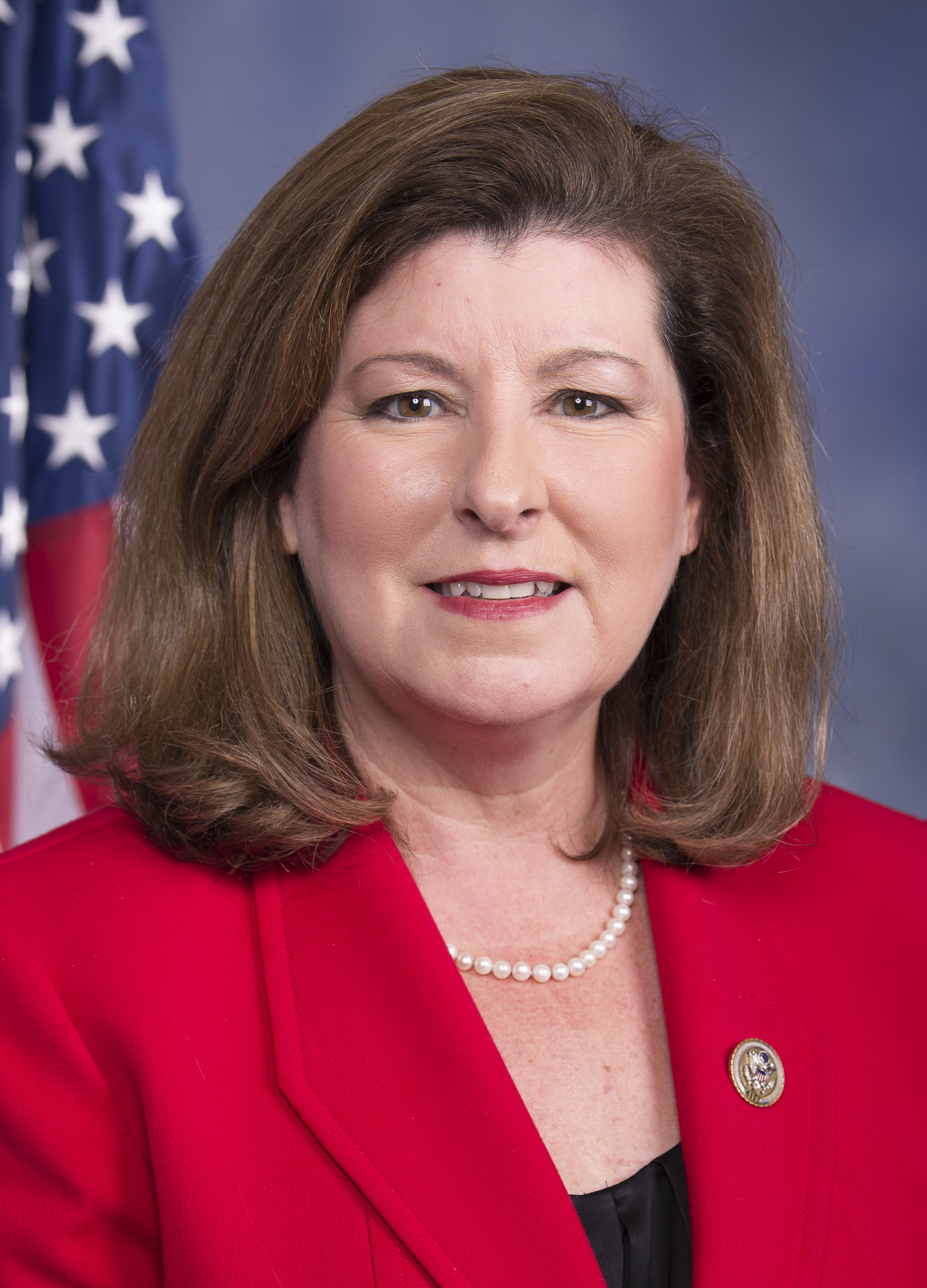
Nominee	Lucy McBath	Karen Handel
Party	Democratic	Republican
Popular vote	216,775	180,329
Percentage	54.6%	45.4%
- McBath: 50–60% 60–70% 70–80% 80–90% Handel: 50–60% 60–70% 70–80% No votes
U.S. Representative before election
Lucy McBath
Democratic
Elected U.S. Representative
Lucy McBath
Democratic

The 6th district covers the northern suburbs of Atlanta, encompassing eastern Cobb County, northern Fulton County, and northern DeKalb County. The district includes all or parts of Roswell, Johns Creek, Tucker, Alpharetta, Marietta, Milton, Mountain Park, Sandy Springs, Brookhaven, Chamblee, Doraville, and Dunwoody. The incumbent was Democrat Lucy McBath, who flipped the district and was elected with 50.5% of the vote in 2018.

=== Democratic primary ===
==== Candidates ====
===== Nominee =====
- Lucy McBath, incumbent U.S. representative

==== Primary results ====
Democratic primary results
Party	Candidate	Votes	%
Democratic	Lucy McBath (incumbent)	90,660	100.0
Total votes		90,660	100.0

=== Republican primary ===
==== Nominee ====
- Karen Handel, former U.S. Representative

===== Eliminated in primary =====
- Mykel Barthelemy, minister and businesswoman
- Blake Harbin, businessman
- Joe Profit, businessman, former NFL player, and nominee for Georgia's 4th congressional district in 2018
- Paulette Smith, activist

===== Withdrawn =====
- Brandon Beach, state senator
- Donnie Bolena, small business owner and former mayoral candidate in Sandy Springs
- Marjorie Taylor Greene, businesswoman (running in the 14th district)
- Nicole Rodden, former U.S. Merchant Marine

===== Declined =====
- Tom Price, former U.S. Secretary of Health and Human Services and former U.S. Representative

==== Primary results ====
Republican primary results
Party	Candidate	Votes	%
Republican	Karen Handel	47,986	74.3
Republican	Joe Profit	9,528	14.8
Republican	Blake Harbin	3,143	4.9
Republican	Mykel Barthelemy	2,780	4.3
Republican	Paulette Smith	1,103	1.7
Total votes		64,540	100.0

=== General election ===
==== Predictions ====
Source	Ranking	As of
The Cook Political Report	Likely D	October 21, 2020
Inside Elections	Likely D	October 29, 2020
Sabato's Crystal Ball	Likely D	October 15, 2020
Politico	Lean D	September 9, 2020
Daily Kos	Lean D	August 31, 2020
RCP	Tossup	June 9, 2020
Niskanen	Likely D	June 7, 2020

==== Endorsements ====
Karen Handel (R)

U.S. executive branch officials

- Tom Price, former U.S. Secretary of Health and Human Services and U.S. representative from GA-6
- Donald Trump, president of the United States

Federal politicians

- Johnny Isakson, former senator from Georgia
- David Perdue, senator from Georgia

State politicians

- Brian Kemp, governor of Georgia

U.S. representatives

- Buddy Carter, U.S. representative from GA-1 since 2015
- Liz Cheney, chair of the House Republican Conference from Wyoming's at-large congressional district
- Doug Collins, U.S. representative from GA-9 since 2013
- Drew Ferguson, U.S. representative from GA-3 since 2017
- Newt Gingrich, former U.S. representative from GA-6, former Speaker of the U.S. House of Representatives
- Tom Graves, U.S. representative from GA-14 since 2010
- Kevin McCarthy, U.S. House Minority Leader (R-CA)
- Steve Scalise, U.S. House Minority Whip (R-LA)
- Austin Scott, U.S. representative from GA-8 since 2011
- Elise Stefanik, U.S. representative from NY-21 since 2015
- Rob Woodall, U.S. representative from GA-7 since 2011

Organizations

- EPAC
- Maggie's List
- Susan B. Anthony List
Lucy McBath (D)

U.S. presidents

- Barack Obama, 44th president of the United States (2009-2017), U.S. senator from Illinois (2005-2008)

Local officials

- Pete Buttigieg, former mayor of South Bend, Indiana (2012–2020) and former candidate for 2020 Democratic presidential nomination

Organizations

- Black Economic Alliance
- Congressional Black Caucus
- EMILY's List
- End Citizens United
- Human Rights Campaign
- Humane Society of the United States Legislative Fund
- League of Conservation Voters Action Fund
- NARAL Pro-Choice America
- Planned Parenthood Action Fund
- Sierra Club

==== Polling ====
Poll source	Date(s) administered	Sample size (Note: Key:A – all adultsRV – registered votersLV – likely votersV – unclear)	Margin of error	Lucy McBath (D)	Karen Handel (R)	Undecided
GQR Research (D) (Note: End Citizens United endorsed McBath prior to the poll's sampling period)	August 11–16, 2020	401 (LV)	± 4.9%	50%	47%	–
North Star Opinion Research (R) (Note: Poll conducted for the NRCC.)	July 26–28, 2020	400 (RV)	± 4.9%	48%	46%	–
North Star Opinion Research (R)	March 15–17, 2020	400 (RV)	± 4.9%	47%	49%	4%
NRCC (R)	June 30 – July 2, 2019	400 (LV)	–	42%	46%	–

Hypothetical polling

with Generic Democrat and Generic Republican

Poll source	Date(s) administered	Sample size	Margin of error	Generic Democrat	Generic Republican	Undecided
North Star Opinion Research/Politico (R)	March 15–17, 2020	400 (RV)	± 4.9%	46%	46%	–

==== Results ====
Georgia's 6th congressional district, 2020
Party	Candidate	Votes	%
Democratic	Lucy McBath (incumbent)	216,775	54.6
Republican	Karen Handel	180,329	45.4
Total votes		397,104	100.0
Democratic hold			

== District 7 ==
2020 Georgia's 7th congressional district election
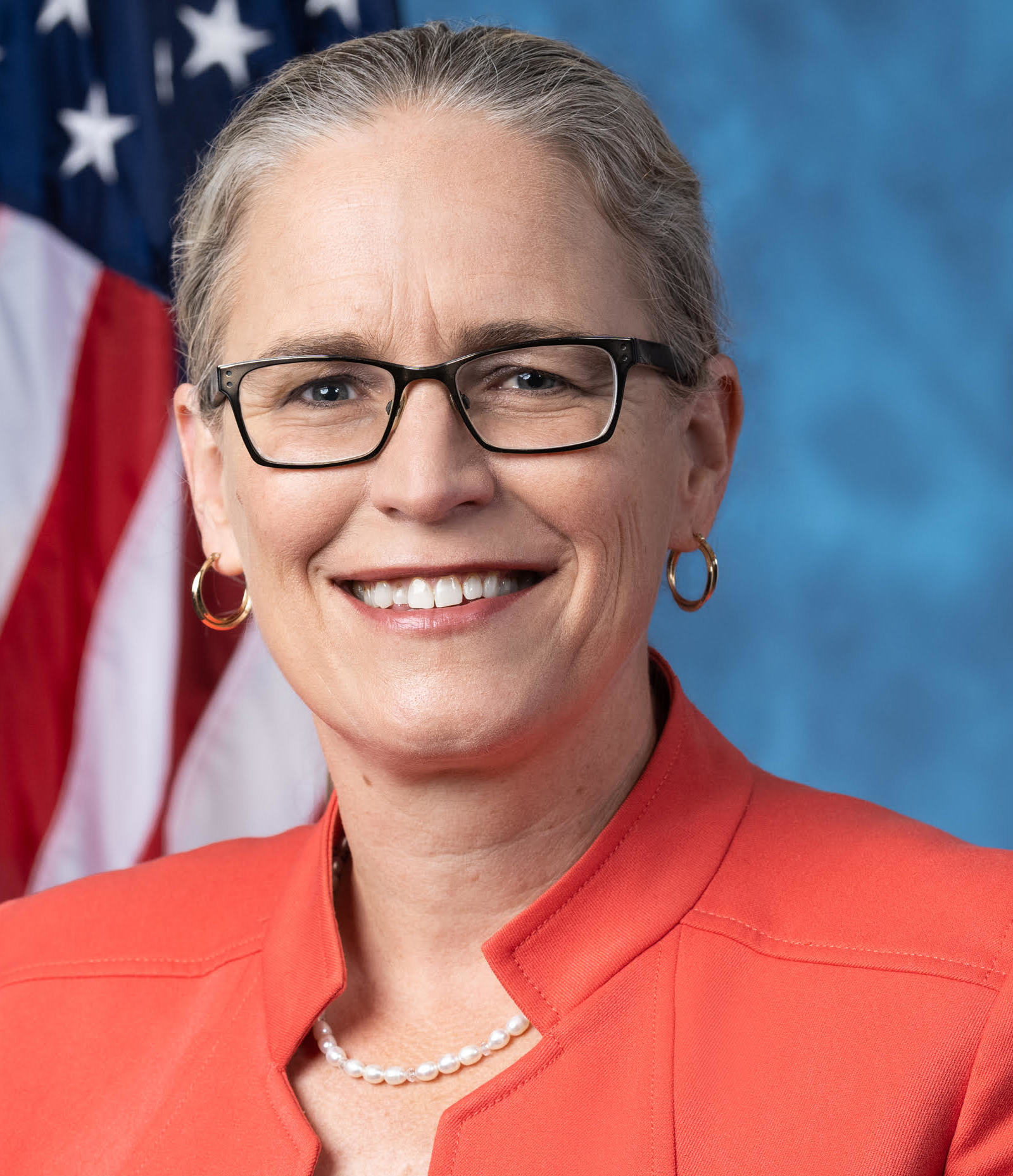

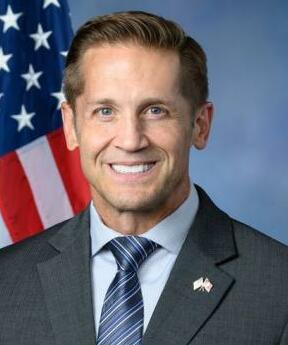
Nominee	Carolyn Bourdeaux	Rich McCormick
Party	Democratic	Republican
Popular vote	190,900	180,564
Percentage	51.4%	48.6%
- Bourdeaux: 50–60% 60–70% 70–80% 80–90% McCormick: 50–60% 60–70% 70–80% No votes
U.S. Representative before election
Rob Woodall
Republican
Elected U.S. Representative
Carolyn Bourdeaux
Democratic

The 7th district covers the northeast Atlanta metropolitan area, encompassing almost all of Gwinnett and Forsyth counties. It includes the cities of Peachtree Corners, Norcross, Cumming, Lawrenceville, Duluth, Snellville, Suwanee, and Buford. The incumbent was Republican Rob Woodall, who was re-elected with 50.1% of the vote in 2018, and subsequently announced he would not seek re-election on February 7, 2019.

=== Republican primary ===
==== Candidates ====
===== Declared =====
- Lisa Babbage, professor, author, board member of the Gwinnett County Republican Party and former member of the Georgia Republican Party state committee
- Mark Gonsalves, businessman
- Lynne Homrich, former human resources manager and nonprofit executive
- Zachary Kennemore, hotel night auditor
- Rich McCormick, physician
- Renee Unterman, state senator
- Eugene Yu, businessman and perennial candidate

===== Withdrawn =====
- Ben Bullock, U.S. Air Force veteran and real estate investor (running in the 14th district)
- Harrison Floyd, former U.S. Marine
- Lerah Lee
- Joe Profit, businessman, former NFL player, and nominee for Georgia's 4th congressional district in 2018 (running for GA-06)

===== Declined =====
- Buzz Brockway, former state representative and candidate for secretary of state in 2018
- David Clark, state representative
- Rick Desai, businessman and former chair of the Georgia Indo-American Chamber of Commerce
- Shane Hazel, former U.S. Marine and candidate for Georgia's 7th congressional district in 2018
- Scott Hilton, former state representative
- Todd Jones, state representative
- P. K. Martin IV, state senator
- B. J. Pak, U.S. attorney for the Northern District of Georgia
- Narender Reddy, businessman and Georgia Regional Transportation Authority board member
- Mike Royal, state school board member and former chair of the Gwinnett County Republican Party
- David Shafer, former state senator
- Rob Woodall, incumbent U.S. representative

==== Endorsements ====
Rich McCormick (R)

Federal politicians

- Ted Cruz, senator from Texas

Organizations

- Club for Growth
- House Freedom Fund
- Tea Party Express
Renee Unterman (R)

State officials

- Nathan Deal, former governor (2011-2019), U.S. representative (GA-09, GA-10, 1993-2010)
- Geoff Duncan, lieutenant governor

Organizations

- Susan B. Anthony List

==== Polling ====
Poll source	Date(s) administered	Sample size	Margin of error	Lynne Hormich	Rich McCormick	Renee Unterman	Other	Undecided
WPA Intelligence/Club for Growth (Note: Poll sponsored by Club for Growth, which endorsed McCormick prior to the poll's sampling period)	May 11–12, 2020	408 (LV)	± 4.9%	7%	41%	23%	5%	24%
WPA Intelligence/Club for Growth	April 14–15, 2020	– (V) (Note: Not yet released)	–	8%	33%	18%	6%	35%

==== Primary results ====
Republican primary results
Party	Candidate	Votes	%
Republican	Rich McCormick	35,280	55.1
Republican	Renee Unterman	11,143	17.4
Republican	Mark Gonsalves	4,640	7.3
Republican	Lynne Homrich	4,567	7.1
Republican	Eugene Yu	3,856	6.0
Republican	Lisa Babbage	3,336	5.2
Republican	Zachary Kennemore	1,195	1.9
Total votes		64,017	100.0

=== Democratic primary ===
==== Candidates ====
===== Declared =====
- Carolyn Bourdeaux, Georgia State University public policy professor, former director of the Georgia Senate Budget Office, and nominee for Georgia's 7th congressional district in 2018
- John Eaves, former chair of the Fulton County Commission
- Nabilah Islam, activist
- Zahra Karinshak, state senator
- Rashid Malik, author and entrepreneur
- Brenda Lopez Romero, state representative

===== Withdrawn =====
- Marqus Cole, attorney

===== Declined =====
- Pedro Marin, state representative
- Sam Park, state representative

==== Endorsements ====
Carolyn Bourdeaux (D)

Federal officials

- Ami Bera, U.S. representative (CA-07)
- Hakeem Jeffries, U.S. representative (NY-08)
- Don Johnson Jr., former U.S. representative (GA-10) (1993-1995)
- Hank Johnson, U.S. representative (GA-04)
- John Lewis, U.S. representative for (GA-05)
- Sam Nunn, former U.S. senator (D-GA) (1972-1997)
- Andrew Young, former mayor of Atlanta (1982–1990), former U.S. ambassador to the United Nations (1977–1979), and U.S. representative (GA-05) (1973–1977)

State officials

- Park Cannon, state representative
- Jasmine Clark, state representative
- Pat Gardner, state representative
- Sally Harrell, state senator and former state representative
- Scott Holcomb, state representative
- Shelly Hutchinson, state representative
- Gregg Kennard, state representative
- Dewey McClain, state representative
- Donna McLeod, state representative
- Mary Margaret Oliver, state representative
- Nan Orrock, state senator and former state representative
- Elena Parent, state senator and former state representative

Organizations

- Brady PAC
- End Citizens United
- Let America Vote
Nabilah Islam (D)

Federal officials

- Alexandria Ocasio-Cortez, U.S. representative (NY-14)
- Ilhan Omar, U.S. representative (MN-05)

State officials

- Jason Carter, nominee for governor of Georgia in 2014, former state senator (2010-2015), and grandson of former U.S. President Jimmy Carter
- Vincent Fort, former state senator (1996-2017) and 2017 Atlanta mayoral election candidate

Organizations

- Asian American Action Fund
- Blue America
- Brand New Congress
- Peace Action
Zahra Karinshak (D)

Federal officials

- Gil Cisneros, U.S. representative (CA-39)
- Max Cleland, former U.S. senator (D-GA) (1997-2003), previously endorsed Carolyn Bourdeaux
- Jason Crow, U.S. representative (CO-06)
- Chrissy Houlahan, U.S. representative (PA-06)
- Elaine Luria, U.S. representative (VA-02)
- Seth Moulton, U.S. representative (MA-06)
- Max Rose, U.S. representative (NY-11)
- Mikie Sherrill, U.S. representative (NJ-11)
- Elissa Slotkin, U.S. representative (MI-08)
- Abigail Spanberger, U.S. representative (VA-07)

State officials

- Thurbert Baker, former Georgia attorney general (1997-2011)
- Roy Barnes, former governor of Georgia (1999-2003), previously endorsed Carolyn Bourdeaux
- Gloria S. Butler, state senator
- Steve Henson, state senator and Senate Minority Leader
- Shelly Hutchinson, state representative
- Lester G. Jackson, state senator
- Donzella James, state senator
- Harold V. Jones II, state senator
- David Lucas, state senator
- Doc Rhett, state senator
- Horacena Tate, state senator

Organizations

- National Iranian American Council
- Public Affairs Alliance of Iranian Americans
Brenda Lopez Romero (D)

State officials

- James Beverly, state representative
- Pedro Marin, state representative
- Billy Mitchell, state representative
- Bob Trammell, state representative and House Minority Leader

==== Primary results ====
Democratic primary results
Party	Candidate	Votes	%
Democratic	Carolyn Bourdeaux	44,710	52.8
Democratic	Brenda Lopez Romero	10,497	12.4
Democratic	Nabilah Islam	10,447	12.3
Democratic	Rashid Malik	6,780	8.0
Democratic	John Eaves	6,548	7.7
Democratic	Zahra Karinshak	5,729	6.8
Total votes		84,711	100.0

=== General election ===
==== Predictions ====
Source	Ranking	As of
The Cook Political Report	Lean D (flip)	August 14, 2020
Inside Elections	Tilt D (flip)	August 7, 2020
Sabato's Crystal Ball	Lean D (flip)	September 3, 2020
Politico	Lean D (flip)	November 2, 2020
Daily Kos	Lean D (flip)	October 26, 2020
RCP	Tossup	June 9, 2020
Niskanen	Lean D (flip)	June 7, 2020

==== Polling ====
Poll source	Date(s) administered	Sample size	Margin of error	Rich McCormick (R)	Carolyn Bourdeaux (D)	Undecided
Public Policy Polling (D) (Note: Poll sponsored by EMILY's List, an organization that supports female Democratic candidates)	June 19–20, 2020	589 (LV)	–	39%	42%	18%

==== Post-primary endorsements ====
Carolyn Bourdeaux (D)

U.S. presidents

- Barack Obama, 44th president of the United States (2009-2017), U.S. senator from Illinois (2005-2008)

Federal officials

- Joe Biden, 47th vice president of the United States (2009-2017), U.S. senator from Delaware (1973-2009)
- Lois Frankel, U.S. representative (FL-21)
- David Price, U.S. representative (NC-04)
- Ron Wyden, U.S. senator (D-OR)

State officials

- Stacey Abrams, 2018 Democratic gubernatorial nominee, former state representative (2007–2017) and House Minority Leader (2011–2017)
- Beth Moore, state representative

Local officials

- Cathy Woolard, president of the Atlanta City Council (2002-2004) and 2017 Atlanta mayoral election candidate

Organizations

- Black Economic Alliance
- EMILY's List
- Everytown for Gun Safety
- Giffords
- League of Conservation Voters Action Fund
- New Democrat Coalition Action Fund
- Planned Parenthood Action Fund
- Sierra Club

Individuals

- Jon Ossoff, Democratic nominee in 2020–21 United States Senate election in Georgia
Rich McCormick (R)

U.S. representatives

- Mike Garcia, U.S. representative from CA-25 since 2020
- Jody Hice, U.S. representative from GA-10 since 2015

==== Results ====
Georgia's 7th congressional district, 2020
Party	Candidate	Votes	%
Democratic	Carolyn Bourdeaux	190,900	51.4
Republican	Rich McCormick	180,564	48.6
Total votes		371,464	100.0
Democratic gain from Republican			

== District 8 ==
2020 Georgia's 8th congressional district election
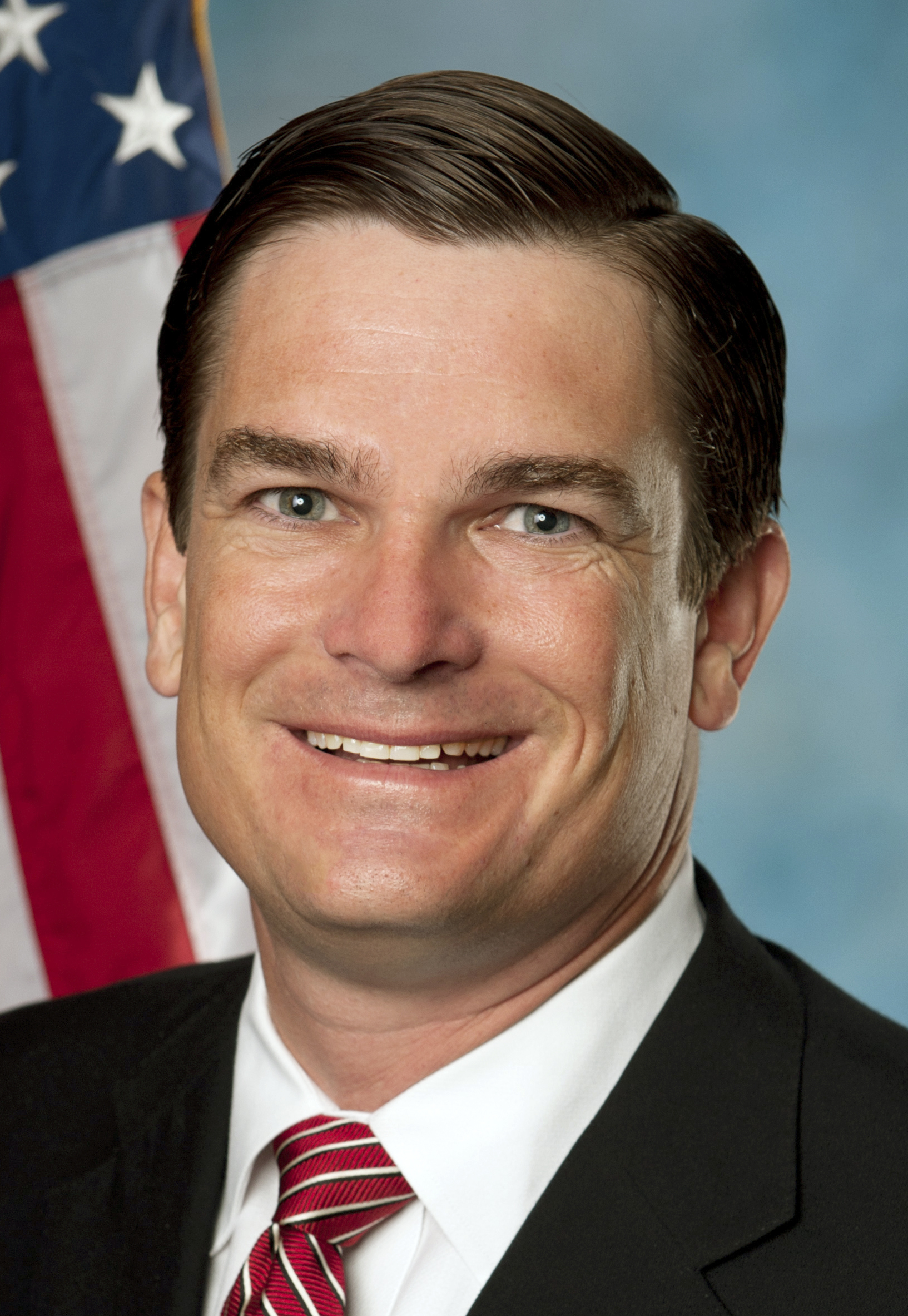

Nominee	Austin Scott	Lindsay Holliday
Party	Republican	Democratic
Popular vote	198,701	109,264
Percentage	64.5%	35.5%
- Scott: 50–60% 60–70% 70–80% 80–90% >90% Holliday: 50–60% 60–70% 70–80% 80–90% >90%
U.S. Representative before election
Austin Scott
Republican
Elected U.S. Representative
Austin Scott
Republican

The 8th district takes in south-central Georgia, including Warner Robins and Valdosta. The incumbent, Republican Austin Scott, was re-elected with 99.7% of the vote without major-party opposition in 2018, and last faced Democratic opposition in 2016.

=== Republican primary ===
==== Candidates ====
===== Declared =====
- Vance Dean, business consultant
- Danny Ellyson, Iraq War veteran
- Austin Scott, incumbent U.S. representative

==== Primary results ====
Republican primary results
Party	Candidate	Votes	%
Republican	Austin Scott (incumbent)	73,671	89.8
Republican	Vance Dean	4,692	5.7
Republican	Danny Ellyson	3,668	4.5
Total votes		82,031	100.0

=== Democratic primary ===
==== Candidates ====
===== Declared =====
- Lindsay "Doc" Holliday, dentist and environmental activist

==== Primary results ====
Democratic primary results
Party	Candidate	Votes	%
Democratic	Lindsay "Doc" Holliday	44,493	100.0
Total votes		44,493	100.0

=== General election ===
==== Predictions ====
Source	Ranking	As of
The Cook Political Report	Safe R	July 2, 2020
Inside Elections	Safe R	June 2, 2020
Sabato's Crystal Ball	Safe R	July 2, 2020
Politico	Safe R	April 19, 2020
Daily Kos	Safe R	June 3, 2020
RCP	Safe R	June 9, 2020
Niskanen	Safe R	June 7, 2020

==== Results ====
Georgia's 8th congressional district, 2020
Party	Candidate	Votes	%
Republican	Austin Scott (incumbent)	198,701	64.5
Democratic	Lindsay "Doc" Holliday	109,264	35.5
Total votes		307,965	100.0
Republican hold			

== District 9 ==
2020 Georgia's 9th congressional district election
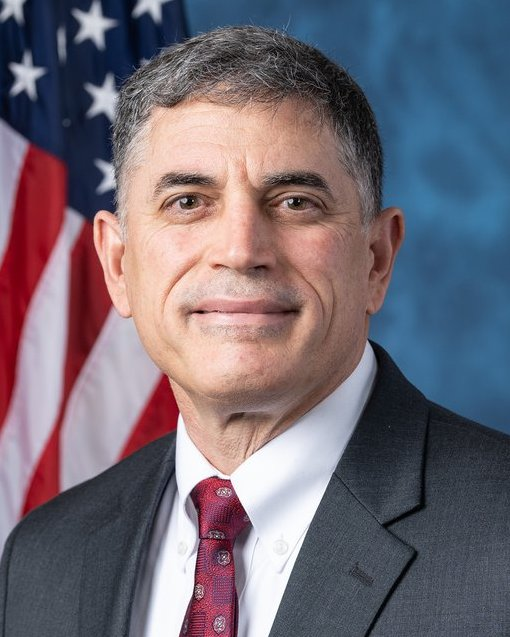

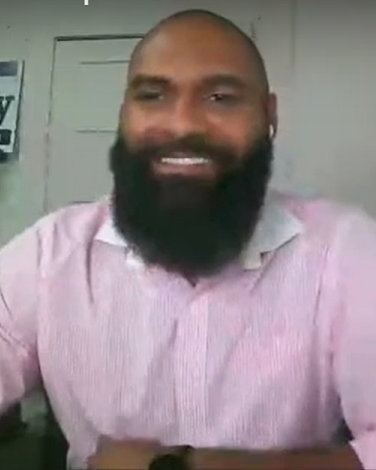
Nominee	Andrew Clyde	Devin Pandy
Party	Republican	Democratic
Popular vote	292,750	79,797
Percentage	78.6%	21.4%
- Clyde: 50–60% 60–70% 70–80% 80–90% >90% Pandy: 50–60% 60–70% 70–80% 80–90%
U.S. Representative before election
Doug Collins
Republican
Elected U.S. Representative
Andrew Clyde
Republican

The 9th district encompasses northeastern Georgia, including the city of Gainesville as well as part of Athens. The incumbent was Republican Doug Collins, who was re-elected with 79.5% of the vote in 2018. On January 29, 2020, Collins announced he would be running for the U.S. Senate seat currently held by appointed U.S. Senator Kelly Loeffler, and thus would not seek re-election.

=== Republican primary ===
==== Candidates ====
===== Declared =====
- Michael Boggus, construction worker
- Paul Broun, former U.S. representative for Georgia's 10th congressional district (2007–2015)
- Andrew Clyde, firearms business-owner and U.S. Navy veteran
- Matt Gurtler, state representative
- Maria Strickland, retired police officer
- Kevin Tanner, state representative
- Ethan Underwood, property rights attorney
- Kellie Weeks, gun shop owner
- John Wilkinson, state senator

===== Declined =====
- Doug Collins, incumbent U.S. representative (running for U.S. Senate)

==== Endorsements ====
Matt Gurtler

Federal officials

- Rand Paul, U.S. senator from Kentucky

Organizations

- Club for Growth
- Constitutional Grassroots Movement
- FreedomWorks
- Protect Freedom PAC

Individuals

- Erick Erickson, blogger
Kevin Tanner (eliminated)

State officials

- Nathan Deal, former governor (2011-2019), U.S. representative (GA-09, GA-10, 1993-2010)
Paul Broun (eliminated)

Organizations

- Gun Owners of America
- National Association for Gun Rights

==== Primary results ====
Results by county: Clyde: 20–30%; 30–40%; Gurtler: 10–20%; 20–30%; 40–50%; 50–60%; Tanner: 20–30%; 40–50%; 50–60%; Broun: 20–30%; 30–40%; Wilkinson: 20–30%; 30–40%; 50–60%; Underwood: 20–30%

Republican primary results
Party	Candidate	Votes	%
Republican	Matt Gurtler	29,426	21.0
Republican	Andrew Clyde	25,914	18.5
Republican	Kevin Tanner	22,187	15.8
Republican	Paul Broun	18,627	13.3
Republican	John Wilkinson	16,314	11.6
Republican	Ethan Underwood	12,117	8.6
Republican	Kellie Weeks	6,422	4.6
Republican	Maria Strickland	4,871	3.5
Republican	Michael Boggus	4,497	3.2
Total votes		140,375	100.0

==== Runoff results ====
Runoff results by county: Clyde: 50–60%; 60–70%; 70–80%; Gurtler: 50–60%

Republican runoff results
Party	Candidate	Votes	%
Republican	Andrew Clyde	50,094	56.3
Republican	Matt Gurtler	38,865	43.7
Total votes		88,959	100.0

=== Democratic primary ===
==== Candidates ====
===== Declared =====
- Devin Pandy, former U.S. Army warrant officer
- Brooke Siskin, businesswoman
- Dan Wilson, retired pastor

==== Primary results ====
Democratic primary results
Party	Candidate	Votes	%
Democratic	Brooke Siskin	12,861	41.2
Democratic	Devin Pandy	10,476	33.6
Democratic	Dan Wilson	7,874	25.2
Total votes		31,211	100.0

==== Runoff results ====
Democratic runoff results
Party	Candidate	Votes	%
Democratic	Devin Pandy	8,019	68.5
Democratic	Brooke Siskin	3,692	31.5
Total votes		11,711	100.0

=== General election ===
==== Predictions ====
Source	Ranking	As of
The Cook Political Report	Safe R	July 2, 2020
Inside Elections	Safe R	June 2, 2020
Sabato's Crystal Ball	Safe R	July 2, 2020
Politico	Safe R	April 19, 2020
Daily Kos	Safe R	June 3, 2020
RCP	Safe R	June 9, 2020
Niskanen	Safe R	June 7, 2020

==== Results ====
Georgia's 9th congressional district, 2020
Party	Candidate	Votes	%
Republican	Andrew Clyde	292,750	78.6
Democratic	Devin Pandy	79,797	21.4
Total votes		372,547	100.0
Republican hold			

== District 10 ==
2020 Georgia's 10th congressional district election
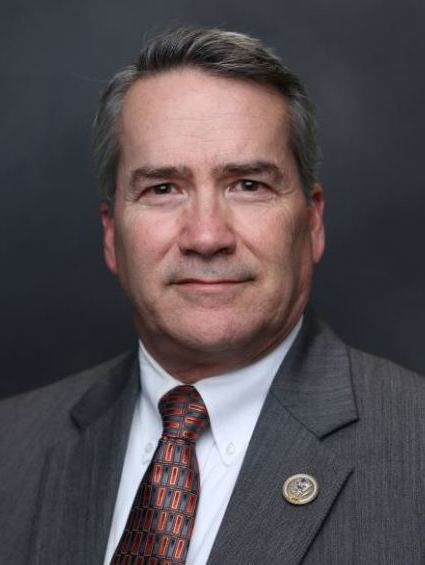

Nominee	Jody Hice	Tabitha Johnson-Green
Party	Republican	Democratic
Popular vote	235,810	142,636
Percentage	62.3%	37.7%
- Hice: 50–60% 60–70% 70–80% 80–90% >90% Johnson-Green: 50–60% 60–70% 70–80% 80–90% Tie: 50%
U.S. Representative before election
Jody Hice
Republican
Elected U.S. Representative
Jody Hice
Republican

The 10th district is located in east-central Georgia, taking in Athens, Eatonton, Jackson, Milledgeville, Monroe, Watkinsville, and Winder. The incumbent was Republican Jody Hice, who was re-elected with 62.9% of the vote in 2018.

=== Republican primary ===
==== Candidates ====
===== Declared =====
- Jody Hice, incumbent U.S. representative

==== Primary results ====
Republican primary results
Party	Candidate	Votes	%
Republican	Jody Hice (incumbent)	93,506	100.0
Total votes		93,506	100.0

=== Democratic primary ===
==== Candidates ====
===== Declared =====
- Andrew Ferguson, screenwriter
- Tabitha Johnson-Green, registered nurse and nominee for Georgia's 10th congressional district in 2018

==== Primary results ====
Democratic primary results
Party	Candidate	Votes	%
Democratic	Tabitha Johnson-Green	48,069	65.7
Democratic	Andrew Ferguson	25,048	34.3
Total votes		73,117	100.0

=== General election ===
==== Predictions ====
Source	Ranking	As of
The Cook Political Report	Safe R	July 2, 2020
Inside Elections	Safe R	June 2, 2020
Sabato's Crystal Ball	Safe R	July 2, 2020
Politico	Safe R	April 19, 2020
Daily Kos	Safe R	June 3, 2020
RCP	Safe R	June 9, 2020
Niskanen	Safe R	June 7, 2020

==== Results ====
Georgia's 10th congressional district, 2020
Party	Candidate	Votes	%
Republican	Jody Hice (incumbent)	235,810	62.3
Democratic	Tabitha Johnson-Green	142,636	37.7
Total votes		378,446	100.0
Republican hold			

== District 11 ==
2020 Georgia's 11th congressional district election
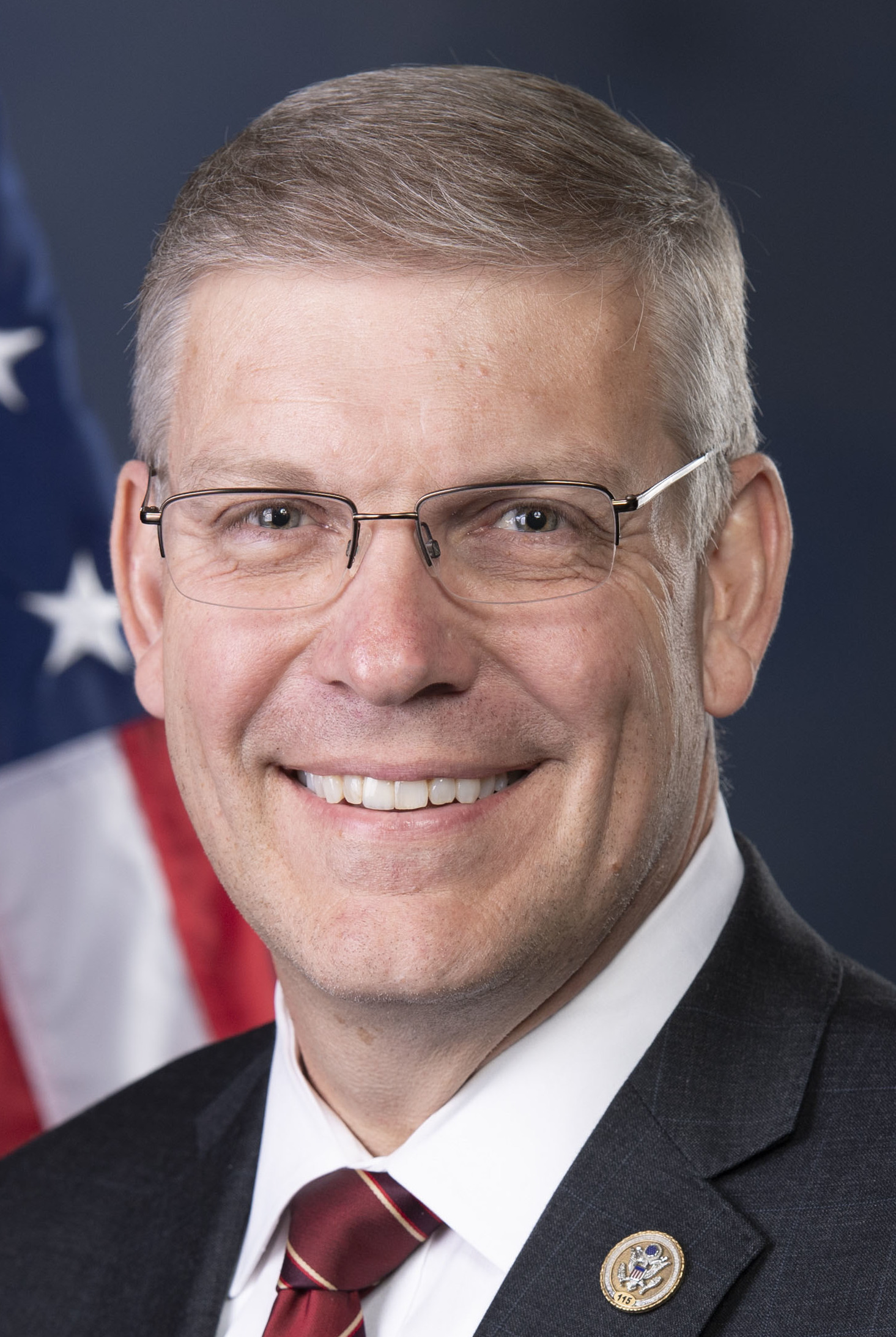

Nominee	Barry Loudermilk	Dana Barrett
Party	Republican	Democratic
Popular vote	245,259	160,623
Percentage	60.4%	39.6%
- Loudermilk: 50–60% 60–70% 70–80% 80–90% >90% Barrett: 50–60% 60–70% 70–80% 80–90% >90% No votes
U.S. Representative before election
Barry Loudermilk
Republican
Elected U.S. Representative
Barry Loudermilk
Republican

The 11th district covers the northwest Atlanta metropolitan area, including Cartersville, Marietta, Woodstock, and parts of Atlanta proper. The incumbent was Republican Barry Loudermilk, who was re-elected with 61.8% of the vote in 2018.

=== Republican primary ===
==== Candidates ====
===== Declared =====
- Barry Loudermilk, incumbent U.S. representative

==== Primary results ====
Republican primary results
Party	Candidate	Votes	%
Republican	Barry Loudermilk (incumbent)	86,050	100.0
Total votes		86,050	100.0

=== Democratic primary ===
==== Candidates ====
===== Declared =====
- Dana Barrett, radio talk show host

===== Withdrawn =====
- Rachel Kinsey, businesswoman
- Asher Nuckolls, physics teacher

==== Primary results ====
Democratic primary results
Party	Candidate	Votes	%
Democratic	Dana Barrett	65,564	100.0
Total votes		65,564	100.0

=== General election ===
==== Predictions ====
Source	Ranking	As of
The Cook Political Report	Safe R	July 2, 2020
Inside Elections	Safe R	June 2, 2020
Sabato's Crystal Ball	Safe R	July 2, 2020
Politico	Safe R	April 19, 2020
Daily Kos	Safe R	June 3, 2020
RCP	Safe R	June 9, 2020
Niskanen	Safe R	June 7, 2020

==== Results ====
Georgia's 11th congressional district, 2020
Party	Candidate	Votes	%
Republican	Barry Loudermilk (incumbent)	245,259	60.4
Democratic	Dana Barrett	160,623	39.6
Total votes		405,882	100.0
Republican hold			

== District 12 ==
2020 Georgia's 12th congressional district election
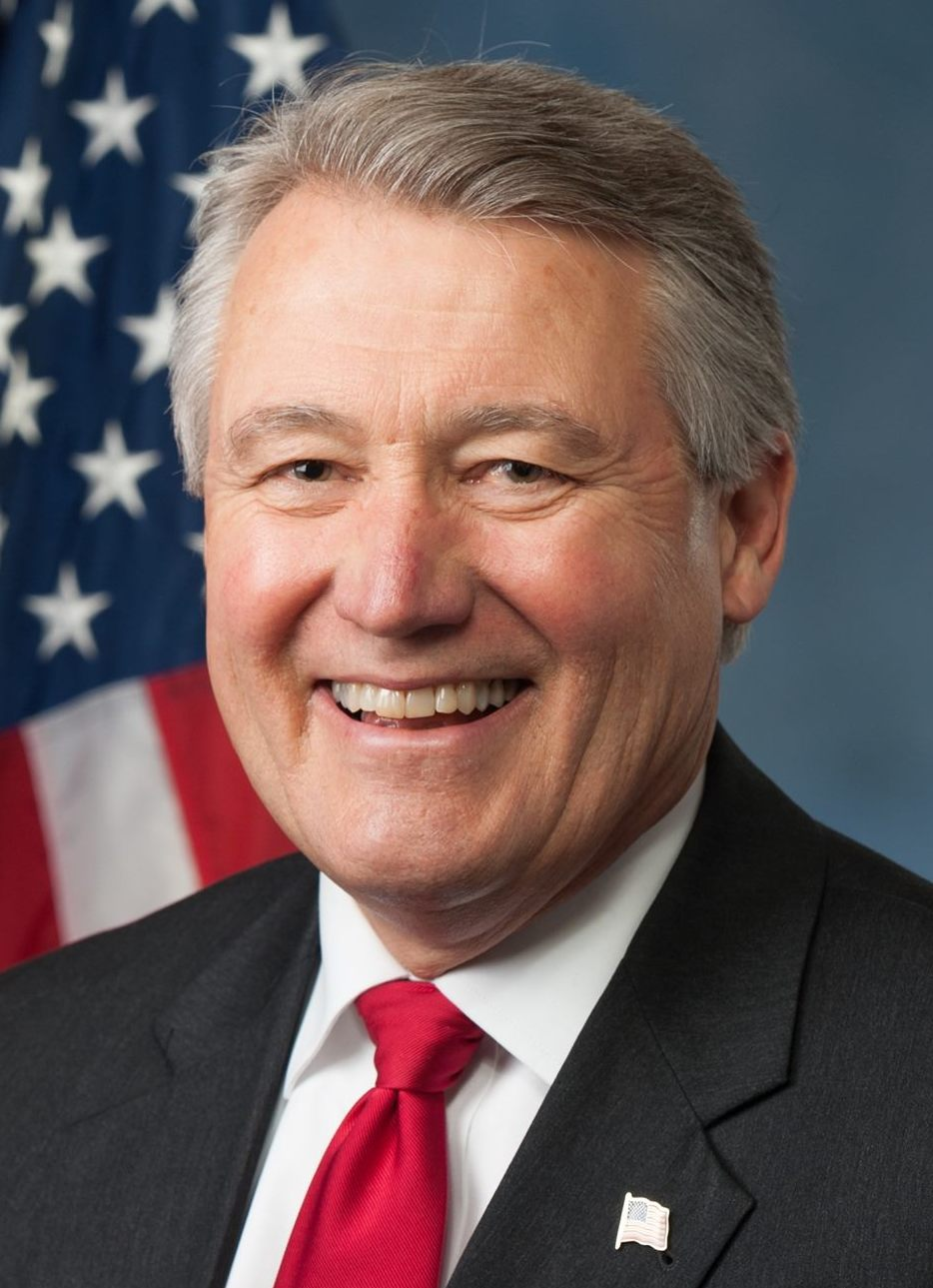

Nominee	Rick Allen	Elizabeth Johnson
Party	Republican	Democratic
Popular vote	181,038	129,061
Percentage	58.4%	41.6%
- Allen: 50–60% 60–70% 70–80% 80–90% >90% Johnson: 50–60% 60–70% 70–80% 80–90% >90%
U.S. Representative before election
Rick W. Allen
Republican
Elected U.S. Representative
Rick W. Allen
Republican

The 12th district is centered around Augusta and takes in the surrounding rural areas. The incumbent was Republican Rick Allen, who was re-elected with 59.5% of the vote in 2018.

=== Republican primary ===
==== Candidates ====
===== Declared =====
- Rick W. Allen, incumbent U.S. representative

==== Primary results ====
Republican primary results
Party	Candidate	Votes	%
Republican	Rick W. Allen (incumbent)	74,520	100.0
Total votes		74,520	100.0

=== Democratic primary ===
==== Candidates ====
===== Declared =====
- Elizabeth Johnson, retired insurance professional
- Dan Steiner, retired attorney

==== Primary results ====
Democratic primary results
Party	Candidate	Votes	%
Democratic	Elizabeth Johnson	48,685	83.6
Democratic	Dan Steiner	9,525	16.4
Total votes		58,210	100.0

=== General election ===
==== Predictions ====
Source	Ranking	As of
The Cook Political Report	Safe R	July 2, 2020
Inside Elections	Safe R	June 2, 2020
Sabato's Crystal Ball	Safe R	July 2, 2020
Politico	Safe R	April 19, 2020
Daily Kos	Safe R	June 3, 2020
RCP	Safe R	June 9, 2020
Niskanen	Safe R	June 7, 2020

==== Results ====
Georgia's 12th congressional district, 2020
Party	Candidate	Votes	%
Republican	Rick W. Allen (incumbent)	181,038	58.4
Democratic	Elizabeth Johnson	129,061	41.6
Total votes		309,544	100.0
Republican hold			

== District 13 ==
2020 Georgia's 13th congressional district election
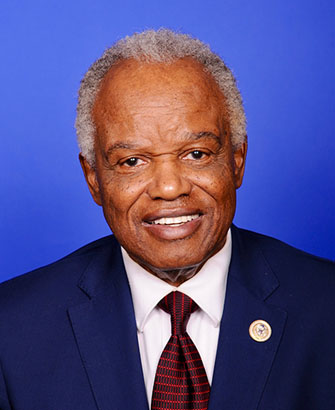

Nominee	David Scott	Becky E. Hites
Party	Democratic	Republican
Popular vote	279,045	81,476
Percentage	77.4%	22.6%
- Scott: 50–60% 60–70% 70–80% 80–90% >90% Hites: 50–60% 60–70% 70–80% No votes
U.S. Representative before election
David Scott
Democratic
Elected U.S. Representative
David Scott
Democratic

The 13th district covers the southwestern suburbs of Atlanta, including Austell, Jonesboro, Mableton, Douglasville, Stockbridge, and Union City, and part of southern Atlanta proper. The incumbent was Democrat David Scott, who was re-elected with 76.2% of the vote in 2018.

=== Democratic primary ===
==== Candidates ====
===== Declared =====
- Michael Owens, former chair of the Cobb County Democratic Party and candidate for Georgia's 13th congressional district in 2014
- Jannquell Peters, former mayor of East Point
- David Scott, incumbent U.S. representative
- Keisha Waites, former state representative

==== Endorsements ====
David Scott

Organizations

- Blue Dog Coalition
- Humane Society of the United States Legislative Fund
- National Education Association
Michael Owens

Organizations

- Brand New Congress

==== Primary results ====
Democratic primary results
Party	Candidate	Votes	%
Democratic	David Scott (incumbent)	77,735	52.9
Democratic	Keisha Waites	37,447	25.5
Democratic	Michael Owens	19,415	13.2
Democratic	Jannquell Peters	12,308	8.4
Total votes		146,905	100.0

=== Republican primary ===
==== Candidates ====
===== Declared =====
- Caesar Gonzales, aerospace engineer
- Becky E. Hites, steel industry consultant

==== Primary results ====
Republican primary results
Party	Candidate	Votes	%
Republican	Becky E. Hites	20,076	68.7
Republican	Caesar Gonzales	9,170	31.3
Total votes		29,246	100.0

=== General election ===
==== Predictions ====
Source	Ranking	As of
The Cook Political Report	Safe D	July 2, 2020
Inside Elections	Safe D	June 2, 2020
Sabato's Crystal Ball	Safe D	July 2, 2020
Politico	Safe D	April 19, 2020
Daily Kos	Safe D	June 3, 2020
RCP	Safe D	June 9, 2020
Niskanen	Safe D	June 7, 2020

==== Results ====
Georgia's 13th congressional district, 2020
Party	Candidate	Votes	%
Democratic	David Scott (incumbent)	279,045	77.4
Republican	Becky E. Hites	81,476	22.6
Total votes		360,521	100.0
Democratic hold			

== District 14 ==
2020 Georgia's 14th congressional district election
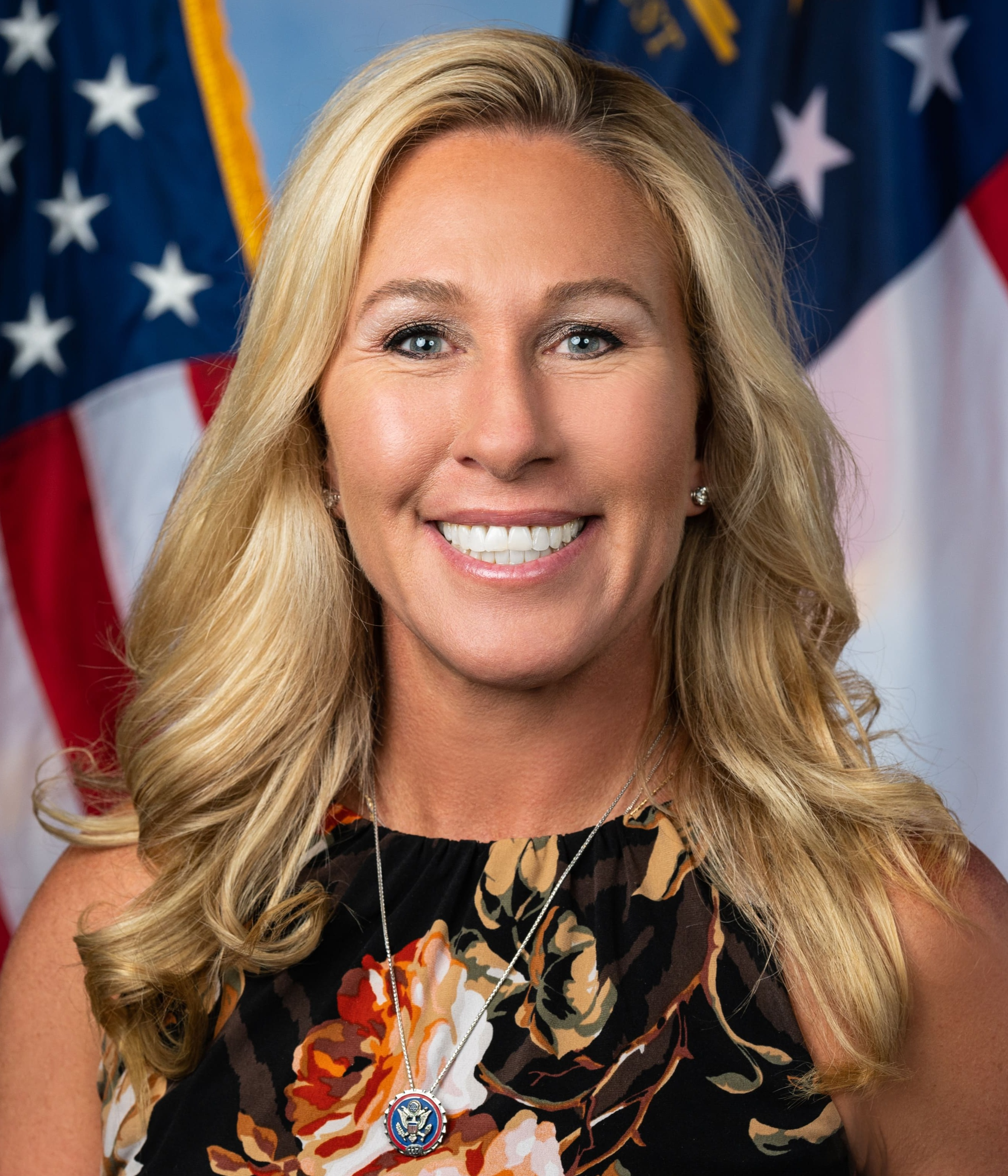

Nominee	Marjorie Taylor Greene	Kevin Van Ausdal (withdrew)
Party	Republican	Democratic
Popular vote	229,827	77,798
Percentage	74.7%	25.3%
- Greene: 50–60% 60–70% 70–80% 80–90% >90% Ausdal: 50–60% 60–70% 70–80% No votes
U.S. Representative before election
Tom Graves
Republican
Elected U.S. Representative
Marjorie Taylor Greene
Republican

The 14th district encompasses rural northwestern Georgia, including Rome and Dalton. The incumbent was Republican Tom Graves, who was re-elected with 76.5% of the vote in 2018. On December 5, 2019, Graves announced he would not seek re-election.

In the Republican primary, neurologist John Cowan, and noted conspiracy theorist Marjorie Taylor Greene, advanced to the runoff election on August 11. After the first round of the election, Politico unearthed videos published by Greene where she expressed racist, anti-Semitic, and Islamophobic views, which led to condemnations from Kevin McCarthy and Steve Scalise. Greene defeated Cowan in the Republican runoff on August 11, 2020.

Democrat Kevin Van Ausdal suspended his campaign on September 11, 2020, citing “personal and family reasons.” It was later reported that, amid a pending divorce, he was forced to vacate his home and moved in with relatives in Indiana because he could not afford alternative housing. Federal campaign finance law prohibits the use of campaign funds for personal living expenses, leaving him unable to remain in Georgia. Because U.S. House candidates must reside in the state they seek to represent, his move rendered him ineligible for the seat.

=== Republican primary ===
==== Candidates ====
===== Declared =====
- John Barge, former Georgia state school superintendent
- Ben Bullock, U.S. Air Force veteran and real estate investor
- Kevin Cooke, state representative
- John Cowan, neurologist
- Clay Fuller, attorney and former White House Fellow
- Marjorie Taylor Greene, businesswoman and proponent of the QAnon conspiracy theory
- Andy Gunther, U.S. Army veteran and U.S. HUD inspector
- Bill Hembree, former state representative
- Matt Laughridge, businessman

===== Declined =====
- Jason Anavitarte, member of Paulding County school board
- Boyd Austin, mayor of Dallas
- Bob Barr, former U.S. representative for Georgia's 7th congressional district (1995–2003)
- Charlice Byrd, former state representative
- Katie Dempsey, state representative
- Tom Graves, incumbent U.S. representative
- Micah Gravley, state representative
- Chuck Hufstetler, state senator
- Trey Kelley, majority whip of the Georgia House of Representatives
- Eddie Lumsden, state representative
- Jeff Mullis, state senator
- Chuck Payne, state senator

===== Endorsements =====
Kevin Cooke (eliminated)

Federal officials

- Jody Hice, U.S. representative (GA-10)

State officials

- Geoff Duncan, lieutenant governor

Organizations

- Family Policy Alliance
John Cowan

Federal officials

- Rick W. Allen, U.S. representative (GA-12)
- Buddy Carter, U.S. representative (GA-01) (originally endorsed Bill Hembree)
- Drew Ferguson, U.S. representative (GA-03)
- Kevin McCarthy, U.S. representative (CA-23) and House Minority Leader, former House Majority Leader (2014–2019) and House Majority Whip (2011–2014)
- Steve Scalise, U.S. representative (LA-01) and House Minority Whip, former House Majority Whip (2014–2019)
- Austin Scott, U.S. representative (GA-08)

State officials

- Matt Barton, state representative
- Mike Dugan, state senator
- Micah Gravley, state representative
- Joseph Gullett, state representative
- Dewayne Hill, state representative
- Chuck Hufstetler, state representative
- Martin Momtahan, state representative
- Jeff Mullis, state senator
- Chuck Payne, state senator

Local officials

- Andy Arnold, mayor of LaFayette
- David Bennett, mayor of Lookout Mountain
- Terry Crawford, mayor pro tempore of Ringgold
- Ray Cross, Dade County sheriff
- Ray Crowder, mayor of Chickamauga
- Randal Dalton, mayor pro tempore of Chickamauga
- Gary Gulledge, Paulding County sheriff
- Teddy Harris, mayor of Rossville
- David Pennington, mayor of Dalton and 2014 Republican gubernatorial candidate
- Mark Schrader, Chattooga County sheriff
- Gary Sisk, Catoosa County sheriff
- Steve Wilson, Walker County sheriff

Individuals

- Ben Bullock, eliminated GA-14 candidate
- Clay Fuller, eliminated GA-14 candidate
- Andy Gunther, eliminated GA-14 candidate
Marjorie Taylor Greene

Federal officials

- Andy Biggs, U.S. representative (AZ-05) and House Freedom Caucus chair
- Matt Gaetz, U.S. representative (FL-01) (originally endorsed Kevin Cooke, rescinded endorsement of Greene on June 18)
- Jim Jordan, U.S. representative (OH-04)

Organizations

- Gun Owners of America
- National Association for Gun Rights PAC
- National Right to Work PAC
- New York Young Republican Club
- Right Women PAC

Individuals

- Erick Erickson, blogger (co-endorsed with Kevin Cooke)

==== Primary results ====
Results by county: Greene: 30–40%; 40–50%; 50–60%; Cowan: 40–50%

Republican primary results
Party	Candidate	Votes	%
Republican	Marjorie Taylor Greene	43,892	40.3
Republican	John Cowan	22,862	21.0
Republican	John Barge	9,619	8.8
Republican	Clay Fuller	7,433	6.8
Republican	Bill Hembree	6,988	6.4
Republican	Kevin Cooke	6,699	6.2
Republican	Matt Laughridge	6,220	5.7
Republican	Ben Bullock	3,883	3.6
Republican	Andy Gunther	1,220	1.1
Total votes		108,816	100.0

==== Runoff polling ====
Poll source	Date(s) administered	Sample size	Margin of error	John Cowan	Marjorie Taylor Greene	Undecided
Battleground Connect (Note: Poll sponsored by Cowan's campaign)	June 19–21, 2020	771 (LV)	± 3.5%	43%	40%	18%
NJ Hotline	June 16, 2020	349 (LV)	± 5.2%	40%	43%	–

==== Runoff results ====
Results by county: Greene: 50–60%; 60–70%; 70–80%; Cowan: 50–60%

Republican runoff results
Party	Candidate	Votes	%
Republican	Marjorie Taylor Greene	43,813	57.0
Republican	John Cowan	32,982	43.0
Total votes		76,795	100.0

=== Democratic primary ===
==== Candidates ====
===== Withdrawn =====
- Kevin Van Ausdal, financial technology professional (nominated, but suspended his campaign on September 11, 2020)

==== Primary results ====
Democratic primary results
Party	Candidate	Votes	%
Democratic	Kevin Van Ausdal	26,615	100.0
Total votes		26,615	100.0

=== General election ===
==== Endorsements ====
Marjorie Taylor Greene
- Donald Trump, 45th president of the United States

==== Predictions ====
Source	Ranking	As of
The Cook Political Report	Safe R	July 2, 2020
Inside Elections	Safe R	June 2, 2020
Sabato's Crystal Ball	Safe R	July 2, 2020
Politico	Safe R	April 19, 2020
Daily Kos	Safe R	June 3, 2020
RCP	Safe R	June 9, 2020
Niskanen	Safe R	June 7, 2020

==== Results ====
Georgia's 14th congressional district, 2020
Party	Candidate	Votes	%
Republican	Marjorie Taylor Greene	229,827	74.7
Democratic	Kevin Van Ausdal	77,798	25.3
Total votes		307,625	100.0
Republican hold			

== See also ==
- Voter suppression in the United States 2019–2020: Georgia
- 2020 Georgia (U.S. state) elections

== Notes ==
Partisan clients
