= Georgia's 14th congressional district =

U.S. House district for Georgia

Coordinates: 34°32′33.94″N 85°7′59″W

- Interactive map of district boundaries since January 3, 2025
- Representative: Clay Fuller; R–Lookout Mountain
- Distribution: 59.72% urban; 40.28% rural
- Population (2025): 811,540
- Median household income: $84,858
- Ethnicity: 70.0% White; 11.9% Black; 11.9% Hispanic; 4.0% Two or more races; 1.5% Asian; 0.7% other
- Occupation: 56.58% Blue-collar; 43.42% White-collar
- Cook PVI: R+19

Georgia's 14th congressional district is a United States congressional district in Georgia. It has been represented by Republican Clay Fuller since April 2026. Located in Northwest Georgia, it was created following the 2010 census, when the state gained a 14th seat in the U.S. House of Representatives. With a Cook Partisan Voting Index of R+19, it is the most Republican congressional district in Georgia.

The district is mostly rural and exurban in character, though it extends into Atlanta's northern fringe and much of the Georgia side of the Chattanooga area. Like most of north Georgia, it has turned almost solidly Republican. While conservative Democrats held most local offices and state legislative seats in what is now the 14th well into the 1990s, today there are very few elected Democrats above the county level. The most notable being the election of Lisa Campbell to Georgia House of Representatives District 35 in November of 2022.

== Counties and communities ==
For the 119th and successive Congresses (based on the districts drawn following a 2023 court order), the district contains all or portions of the following counties and communities.

Catoosa County (4)

All four communities

Chattooga County (4)

All four communities

Cobb County (2)

Acworth, Kennesaw, Marietta (part; also 11th)

Dade County (4)

All four communities

Floyd County (5)

All five communities

Murray County (2)

Chatsworth, Eton

Paulding County (3)

All three communities

Polk County (5)

All five communities

Walker County (9)

All nine communities

Whitfield County (4)

All four communities

== List of members representing the district ==
The district was established from portions of the old 9th and 11th districts following the 112th Congress, based on the 2010 census.

Member (residence)	Party	Years	Cong ress	Electoral history	District location
District created January 3, 2013
Tom Graves (Ranger)	Republican	January 3, 2013 – October 4, 2020	113th 114th 115th 116th	Redistricted from the 9th district and re-elected in 2012. Re-elected in 2014. Re-elected in 2016. Re-elected in 2018. Announced retirement, then resigned.	2013–2023 Catoosa, Chattooga, Dade, Floyd, Gordon, Haralson, Murray, Paulding, Polk, Walker, and Whitfield; part of Pickens
Vacant		October 4, 2020 – January 3, 2021	116th		2013–2023 Catoosa, Chattooga, Dade, Floyd, Gordon, Haralson, Murray, Paulding, Polk, Walker, and Whitfield; part of Pickens
Marjorie Taylor Greene (Rome)	Republican	January 3, 2021 – January 5, 2026	117th 118th 119th	Elected in 2020. Re-elected in 2022. Re-elected in 2024. Resigned.	2013–2023 Catoosa, Chattooga, Dade, Floyd, Gordon, Haralson, Murray, Paulding, Polk, Walker, and Whitfield; part of Pickens
Marjorie Taylor Greene (Rome)	Republican	January 3, 2021 – January 5, 2026	117th 118th 119th	Elected in 2020. Re-elected in 2022. Re-elected in 2024. Resigned.	2023–2025
Marjorie Taylor Greene (Rome)	Republican	January 3, 2021 – January 5, 2026	117th 118th 119th	Elected in 2020. Re-elected in 2022. Re-elected in 2024. Resigned.	2025–present
Vacant		January 5, 2026 – April 14, 2026	119th		2025–present
Clay Fuller (Lookout Mountain)	Republican	April 14, 2026 – present	119th	Elected to finish Greene’s term. Re-elected in 2026.	2025–present

== Recent election results for this district from statewide races ==
Year	Office	Results
2008	President	McCain 69% – 29%
2012	President	Romney 72% – 28%
2016	President	Trump 71% – 26%
2016	Senate	Isakson 71% – 24%
2018	Governor	Kemp 70% – 29%
2018	Lt. Governor	Duncan 71% – 29%
2018	Attorney General	Carr 71% – 29%
2020	President	Trump 68% – 31%
2021	Senate (Reg.)	Perdue 68% – 32%
2021	Senate (Spec.)	Loeffler 68% – 32%
2022	Senate	Walker 68% – 32%
2022	Governor	Kemp 72% – 27%
2022	Lt. Governor	Jones 69% – 28%
2022	Secretary of State	Raffensperger 71% – 26%
2022	Attorney General	Carr 70% – 28%
2024	President	Trump 68% – 31%

== Election results ==
=== 2012 ===
Georgia's 14th Congressional District election (2012)
Party	Candidate	Votes	%
Republican	Tom Graves (incumbent)	159,947	72.97
Democratic	Daniel "Danny" Grant	59,245	27.03
Total votes		219,192	100.00
Republican hold			

=== 2014 ===
Georgia's 14th Congressional District election (2014)
Party	Candidate	Votes	%
Republican	Tom Graves (incumbent)	118,782	100.00
Total votes		118,782	100.00
Republican hold			

=== 2016 ===
Georgia's 14th Congressional District election (2016)
Party	Candidate	Votes	%
Republican	Tom Graves (incumbent)	216,743	100.00
Total votes		216,743	100.00
Republican hold			

=== 2018 ===
Georgia's 14th Congressional District election (2018)
Party	Candidate	Votes	%
Republican	Tom Graves (incumbent)	175,743	76.50
Democratic	Steven Lamar Foster	53,981	23.50
Total votes		229,724	100.00
Republican hold			

=== 2020 ===
Georgia's 14th congressional district, 2020
Party	Candidate	Votes	%
Republican	Marjorie Taylor Greene	229,827	74.71
Democratic	Kevin Van Ausdal (withdrew; remained on ballot)	77,798	25.29
Total votes		307,625	100.00
Republican hold			

=== 2022 ===
Georgia's 14th congressional district, 2022
Party	Candidate	Votes	%
Republican	Marjorie Taylor Greene (incumbent)	170,162	65.86
Democratic	Marcus Flowers	88,189	34.14
Total votes		258,351	100.00
Republican hold			

=== 2024 ===
Georgia's 14th congressional district, 2024
Party	Candidate	Votes	%
Republican	Marjorie Taylor Greene (incumbent)	243,446	64.37
Democratic	Shawn Harris	134,759	35.63
Total votes		378,205	100.00
Republican hold			

=== 2026 special ===
2026 Georgia's 14th congressional district special election runoff results
Party	Candidate	Votes	%
Republican	Clay Fuller	72,338	55.89
Democratic	Shawn Harris	57,097	44.11
Total votes		129,435	100.00
Republican hold			

== See also ==
- Georgia's congressional districts
- List of United States congressional districts
