= Lookout Mountain, Georgia =

City in Georgia, United States

- City
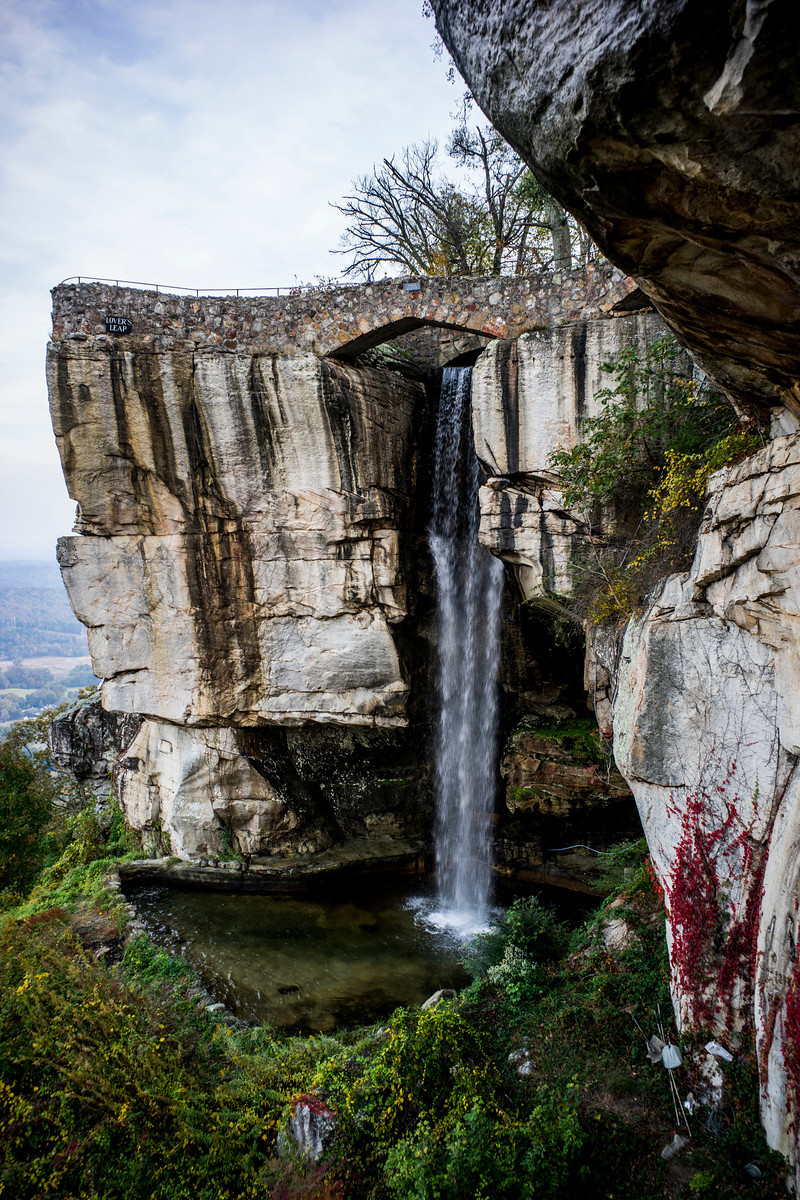
- High Falls at Rock City

- Seal

- Location in Walker County and the state of Georgia
- Coordinates: 34°58′31″N 85°21′17″W
- Country: United States
- State: Georgia
- County: Walker

Government
  - Mayor: Arch Willingham

Area
  - Total: 2.66 sq mi (6.89 km^{2})
  - Land: 2.66 sq mi (6.89 km^{2})
  - Water: 0 sq mi (0.00 km^{2})
- Elevation: 1,801 ft (549 m)

Population (2020)
  - Total: 1,641
  - Density: 617.2/sq mi (238.29/km^{2})
- Time zone: UTC-5 (Eastern (EST))
  - Summer (DST): UTC-4 (EDT)
- ZIP code: 30750
- Area codes: 706/762
- FIPS code: 13-47336
- GNIS feature ID: 0332265
- Website: lookoutmtnga.com

Lookout Mountain is a city in Walker County, Georgia, United States. Bordering its sister town of Lookout Mountain, Tennessee, Lookout Mountain is part of the Chattanooga metropolitan statistical area. The population was 1,641 at the 2020 census. The city is located on Lookout Mountain, home to such attractions as Rock City. This city is often named as home to Covenant College, but the college is actually across the county line in Dade County.

== Geography ==
Lookout Mountain is located at 34°58′31″N 85°21′17″W (34.975307, -85.354826).

According to the United States Census Bureau, the city has a total area of 2.7 square miles (6.9 km^{2}), all of it land.

== Demographics ==
Historical population
Census	Pop.	Note	%±
1970	1,538		—
1980	1,505		−2.1%
1990	1,636		8.7%
2000	1,617		−1.2%
2010	1,602		−0.9%
2020	1,641		2.4%
U.S. Decennial Census; 1850-1870 1870-1880; 1890-1910 1920-1930; 1940 1950 1960; 1970 1980 1990; 2000

=== 2020 census ===
As of the 2020 census, Lookout Mountain had a population of 1,641.

The median age was 40.4 years. 27.1% of residents were under the age of 18 and 19.4% were 65 years of age or older. For every 100 females, there were 95.6 males, and for every 100 females age 18 and over, there were 88.5 males age 18 and over.

68.6% of residents lived in urban areas, while 31.4% lived in rural areas.

There were 611 households and 465 families in the city. Of all households, 36.5% had children under the age of 18 living in them. Married-couple households made up 65.6% of households, households with a male householder and no spouse or partner present made up 10.1%, and households with a female householder and no spouse or partner present made up 22.3%. About 19.6% of all households were made up of individuals, and 10.8% had someone living alone who was 65 years of age or older.

There were 647 housing units, of which 5.6% were vacant. The homeowner vacancy rate was 0.6% and the rental vacancy rate was 8.6%.

Lookout Mountain racial composition
Race	Num.	Perc.
White (non-Hispanic)	1,522	92.75%
Black or African American (non-Hispanic)	8	0.49%
Native American	1	0.06%
Asian	6	0.37%
Other/Mixed	77	4.69%
Hispanic or Latino	27	1.65%

=== 2000 census ===
As of the census of 2000, there were 1,617 people, 618 households, and 441 families residing in the city. The population density was 608.3 inhabitants per square mile (234.9/km^{2}). There were 657 housing units at an average density of 247.2 per square mile (95.4/km^{2}). The racial makeup of the city was 99.01% White, 0.19% Asian, 0.25% from other races, and 0.56% from two or more races. Hispanic or Latino of any race were 0.80% of the population.

There were 618 households, out of which 36.4% had children under the age of 18 living with them, 65.5% were married couples living together, 4.5% had a female householder with no husband present, and 28.6% were non-families. 24.8% of all households were made up of individuals, and 11.8% had someone living alone who was 65 years of age or older. The average household size was 2.62 and the average family size was 3.16.

In the city, the population was spread out, with 29.8% under the age of 18, 5.3% from 18 to 24, 27.7% from 25 to 44, 21.8% from 45 to 64, and 15.4% who were 65 years of age or older. The median age was 37 years. For every 100 females, there were 93.7 males. For every 100 females age 18 and over, there were 88.5 males.

The median income for a household in the city was $62,045, and the median income for a family was $76,580. Males had a median income of $52,071 versus $30,962 for females. The per capita income for the city was $31,227. About 3.5% of families and 5.6% of the population were below the poverty line, including 5.2% of those under age 18 and 1.8% of those age 65 or over.

== Colleges ==
Covenant College, a Presbyterian college, is located in neighboring Dade County. The college became infamous for Mark David Chapman, the assassin of John Lennon, who briefly attended in the early 1970s. Covenant is affiliated with the Presbyterian Church in America (PCA).

== Notable residents ==
- Clay Fuller, United States Representative from Georgia's 14th congressional district
