= 2018 Georgia State Senate election =

- November 6, 2018

All 56 seats in the Georgia State Senate 28 (with Lt. Gov.) seats needed for a majority
	Majority party	Minority party
Leader	Butch Miller	Steve Henson
Party	Republican	Democratic
Leader's seat	49th	41st
Last election	38	18
Seats before	37	19
Seats after	35	21
Seat change	▼2	▲2
Popular vote	1,914,110	1,603,472
Percentage	54.42%	45.58%
Swing	▼9.66%	▲9.66%
- Results: Democratic gain Republican hold Democratic hold
President pro tempore before election
Butch Miller
Republican
Elected President pro tempore
Butch Miller
Republican

The 2018 Georgia State Senate elections took place as part of the biennial United States elections. Georgia voters elected state senators in all 56 of the state senate's districts. State senators serve two-year terms in the Georgia State Senate.

A primary election on May 22, 2018, determined which candidates appeared on the November 6 general election ballot. Primary election results can be obtained from the Georgia Secretary of State's website. A statewide map of Georgia's state Senate districts can be obtained from the Georgia Legislative and Congressional Reapportionment Office here, and individual district maps can be obtained from the U.S. Census here.

Following the 2016 state senate elections, Republicans maintained effective control of the Senate with 38 members. However, on December 5, 2017, Democrats flipped State Senate district 6 after Democrat Jen Jordan won a special election. This decreased Republican seats from 38 to 37 and increased Democratic seats from 18 to 19.

To reclaim control of the chamber from Republicans, the Democrats needed to net nine Senate seats and win the concurrent lieutenant gubernatorial election, or net 10 seats without the lieutenant governor's office. Democrats flipped two seats—districts 40 and 48—from Republican control; however, Republicans retained control of the Georgia State Senate following the 2018 general election.

== Results ==
Popular vote
Republican	54.42%
Democratic	45.58%
Other	0.14%

Senate seats
Republican	62.5%
Democratic	37.5%

== Results ==
State senate district	Incumbent	Party	Elected senator	Party
1st	Ben Watson	Rep	Ben Watson	Republican
2nd	Lester G. Jackson	Dem	Lester G. Jackson	Democratic
3rd	William T. Ligon Jr.	Rep	Willam T. Ligon Jr.	Republican
4th	Jack Hill	Rep	Jack Hill	Republican
5th	Curt Thompson	Dem	Sheikh Rahman	Democratic
6th	Jen Jordan	Dem	Jen Jordan	Democratic
7th	Tyler Harper	Rep	Tyler Harper	Republican
8th	Ellis Black	Rep	Ellis Black	Republican
9th	P.K. Martin IV	Rep	P.K. Martin IV	Republican
10th	Emanuel Jones	Dem	Emanuel Jones	Democratic
11th	Dean Burke	Rep	Dean Burke	Republican
12th	Freddie Powell Sims	Dem	Freddie Powell Sims	Democratic
13th	Greg Kirk	Rep	Greg Kirk	Republican
14th	Bruce Thompson	Rep	Bruce Thompson	Republican
15th	Ed Harbison	Dem	Ed Harbison	Democratic
16th	Marty Harbin	Rep	Marty Harbin	Republican
17th	Brian Strickland	Rep	Brian Strickland	Republican
18th	John F. Kennedy	Rep	John F. Kennedy	Republican
19th	Blake Tillery	Rep	Blake Tillery	Republican
20th	Larry Walker III	Rep	Larry Walker	Republican
21st	Brandon Beach	Rep	Brandon Beach	Republican
22nd	Harold V. Jones II	Dem	Harold V. Jones II	Democratic
23rd	Jesse Stone	Rep	Jesse Stone	Republican
24th	Lee Anderson	Rep	Lee Anderson	Republican
25th	Burt Jones	Rep	Burt Jones	Republican
26th	David Lucas	Dem	David Lucas	Democratic
27th	Michael Williams	Rep	Greg Dolezal	Republican
28th	Matt Brass	Rep	Matt Brass	Republican
29th	Joshua McKoon	Rep	Randy Robertson	Republican
30th	Mike Dugan	Rep	Mike Dugan	Republican
31st	Bill Heath	Rep	Bill Heath	Republican
32nd	Kay Kirkpatrick	Rep	Kay Kirkpatrick	Republican
33rd	Michael "Doc" Rhett	Dem	Doc Rhett	Democratic
34th	Valencia Seay	Dem	Valencia Seay	Democratic
35th	Donzella James	Dem	Donzella James	Democratic
36th	Nan Orrock	Dem	Nan Orrock	Democratic
37th	Lindsey Tippins	Rep	Lindsey Tippins	Republican
38th	Horacena Tate	Dem	Horacena Tate	Democratic
39th	Nikema Williams	Dem	Nikema Williams	Democratic
40th	Fran Millar	Rep	Sally Harrell	Democratic
41st	Steve Henson	Dem	Steve Henson	Democratic
42nd	Elena Parent	Dem	Elena Parent	Democratic
43rd	Tonya Anderson	Dem	Tonya Anderson	Democratic
44th	Gail Davenport	Dem	Gail Davenport	Democratic
45th	Renee Unterman	Rep	Renee Unterman	Republican
46th	Bill Cowsert	Rep	Bill Cowsert	Republican
47th	Frank Ginn	Rep	Frank Ginn	Republican
48th	David Shafer	Rep	Zahra Karinshak	Democratic
49th	Butch Miller	Rep	Butch Miller	Republican
50th	John Wilkinson	Rep	John Wilkinson	Republican
51st	Steve Gooch	Rep	Steve Gooch	Republican
52nd	Chuck Hufstetler	Rep	Chuck Hufstetler	Republican
53rd	Jeff Mullis	Rep	Jeff Mullis	Republican
54th	Chuck Payne	Rep	Chuck Payne	Republican
55th	Gloria Butler	Dem	Gloria Butler	Democratic
56th	John Albers	Rep	John Albers	Republican

=== Closest races ===
Seats where the margin of victory was under 10%:

1. State Senate district 9, 3.8%
2. State Senate district 56, 5%
3. State Senate district 48, 7.2% (gain)
4. State Senate district 17, 9%
5. State Senate district 40, 9.6% (gain)

== Predictions ==
Source	Ranking	As of
Governing	Likely R	October 8, 2018

== Detailed results ==
- Note: If a district only lists one primary election, the other major party failed to field a candidate in that district.

=== District 1 ===
Republican primary
Party	Candidate	Votes	%
Republican	Ben Watson (incumbent)	9,262	100
Total votes		9,262	100.0

Democratic primary
Party	Candidate	Votes	%
Democratic	Sandra Workman	7,193	100
Total votes		7,193	100.0

Georgia State Senate district 1 general election, 2018
Party	Candidate	Votes	%
Republican	Ben Watson (incumbent)	42,316	60.8
Democratic	Sandra Workman	27,258	39.2
Total votes		69,574	100.0
Republican hold			

=== District 2 ===
Democratic primary
Party	Candidate	Votes	%
Democratic	Lester G. Jackson (incumbent)	12,296	100
Total votes		12,296	100.0

Georgia State Senate district 2 general election, 2018
Party	Candidate	Votes	%
Democratic	Lester G. Jackson (incumbent)	49,567	100.0
Total votes		49,567	100.0
Democratic hold			

=== District 3 ===
Democratic primary
Party	Candidate	Votes	%
Democratic	Jerrold Dagen	4,369	100
Total votes		4,369	100.0

Republican primary
Party	Candidate	Votes	%
Republican	William Ligon (incumbent)	11,060	100
Total votes		11,060	100.0

Georgia State Senate district 3 general election, 2018
Party	Candidate	Votes	%
Republican	William Ligon (incumbent)	42,190	67.9
Democratic	Jerrold Dagen	19,946	32.1
Total votes		62,136	100.0
Republican hold			

=== District 4 ===
Republican primary
Party	Candidate	Votes	%
Republican	Jack Hill (incumbent)	10,417	100
Total votes		10,417	100.0

Georgia State Senate district 4 general election, 2018
Party	Candidate	Votes	%
Republican	Jack Hill (incumbent)	51,765	100.0
Total votes		51,765	100.0
Republican hold			

=== District 5 ===
Democratic primary
Party	Candidate	Votes	%
Democratic	Sheikh Rahman	4,010	67.99
Democratic	Curt Thompson (incumbent)	1,888	32.01
Total votes		5,898	100.0

Georgia State Senate district 5 general election, 2018
Party	Candidate	Votes	%
Democratic	Sheikh Rahman	34,429	100.0
Total votes		34,429	100.0
Democratic hold			

=== District 6 ===
Republican primary
Party	Candidate	Votes	%
Republican	Leah Aldridge	5,974	56.75
Republican	John Gordon	4,552	43.25
Total votes		10,526	100.0

Democratic primary
Party	Candidate	Votes	%
Democratic	Jen Jordan (incumbent)	10,030	100
Total votes		10,030	100.0

Georgia State Senate district 6 general election, 2018
Party	Candidate	Votes	%
Democratic	Jen Jordan (incumbent)	46,667	58.4
Republican	Leah Aldridge	33,213	41.6
Total votes		79,880	100.0
Democratic hold			

=== District 7 ===
Republican primary
Party	Candidate	Votes	%
Republican	Tyler Harper (incumbent)	10,199	100
Total votes		10,199	100

Georgia State Senate district 7 general election, 2018
Party	Candidate	Votes	%
Republican	Tyler Harper (incumbent)	45,488	100.0
Total votes		45,488	100.0
Republican hold			

=== District 8 ===
Republican primary
Party	Candidate	Votes	%
Republican	Ellis Black (incumbent)	8,106	100
Total votes		8,106	100

Georgia State Senate district 8 general election, 2018
Party	Candidate	Votes	%
Republican	Ellis Black (incumbent)	43,054	100.0
Total votes		43,054	100.0
Republican hold			

=== District 9 ===
Republican primary
Party	Candidate	Votes	%
Republican	P.K. Martin IV (incumbent)	10,189	100
Total votes		10,189	100

Democratic primary
Party	Candidate	Votes	%
Democratic	Cheryle Moses	8,342	100
Total votes		8,342	100

Georgia State Senate district 9 general election, 2018
Party	Candidate	Votes	%
Republican	P.K. Martin IV (incumbent)	42,403	51.9
Democratic	Cheryle Moses	39,247	48.1
Total votes		81,650	100.0
Republican hold			

=== District 10 ===
Democratic primary
Party	Candidate	Votes	%
Democratic	Emanuel Jones (incumbent)	19,819	100
Total votes		19,819	100

Georgia State Senate district 10 general election, 2018
Party	Candidate	Votes	%
Democratic	Emanuel Jones (incumbent)	71,364	100.0
Total votes		71,364	100.0
Democratic hold			

=== District 11 ===
Republican primary
Party	Candidate	Votes	%
Republican	Dean Burke (incumbent)	9,051	100
Total votes		9,051	100

Georgia State Senate district 11 general election, 2018
Party	Candidate	Votes	%
Republican	Dean Burke (incumbent)	45,005	100.0
Total votes		45,005	100.0
Republican hold			

=== District 12 ===
Democratic primary
Party	Candidate	Votes	%
Democratic	Freddie Powell Sims (incumbent)	11,308	100
Total votes		11,308	100

Georgia State Senate district 12 general election, 2018
Party	Candidate	Votes	%
Democratic	Freddie Powell Sims (incumbent)	44,507	100.0
Total votes		44,507	100.0
Democratic hold			

=== District 13 ===
Republican primary
Party	Candidate	Votes	%
Republican	Greg Kirk (incumbent)	10,883	100
Total votes		10,883	100

Georgia State Senate district 13 general election, 2018
Party	Candidate	Votes	%
Republican	Greg Kirk (incumbent)	48,649	100.0
Total votes		48,649	100.0
Republican hold			

=== District 14 ===
Democratic primary
Party	Candidate	Votes	%
Democratic	Rachel A. Kinsey	3,222	100
Total votes		3,222	100

Republican primary
Party	Candidate	Votes	%
Republican	Bruce Thompson (incumbent)	10,421	100
Total votes		10,421	100

Georgia State Senate district 14 general election, 2018
Party	Candidate	Votes	%
Republican	Bruce Thompson (incumbent)	50,083	71.0
Democratic	Rachel A. Kinsey	20,412	29.0
Total votes		70,495	100.0
Republican hold			

=== District 15 ===
Democratic primary
Party	Candidate	Votes	%
Democratic	Ed Harbison (incumbent)	10,856	100
Total votes		10,856	100

Georgia State Senate district 15 general election, 2018
Party	Candidate	Votes	%
Democratic	Ed Harbison (incumbent)	39,711	100.0
Total votes		39,711	100.0
Democratic hold			

=== District 16 ===
Republican primary
Party	Candidate	Votes	%
Republican	Marty Harbin (incumbent)	10,685	62.26
Republican	Tricia Stearns	6,478	37.74
Total votes		17,163	100

Democratic primary
Party	Candidate	Votes	%
Democratic	Bill Lightle	4,930	100
Total votes		4,930	100

Georgia State Senate district 16 general election, 2018
Party	Candidate	Votes	%
Republican	Marty Harbin (incumbent)	53,201	68.15
Democratic	Bill Lightle	24,858	31.85
Total votes		78,059	100.0
Republican hold			

=== District 17 ===
Democratic primary
Party	Candidate	Votes	%
Democratic	Phyllis D. Hatcher	8,568	100
Total votes		8,568	100

Republican primary
Party	Candidate	Votes	%
Republican	Brian Strickland (incumbent)	12,260	92.29
Republican	Nelva Lee	1,024	7.71
Total votes		13,284	100

Georgia State Senate district 17 general election, 2018
Party	Candidate	Votes	%
Republican	Brian Strickland (incumbent)	44,366	54.5
Democratic	Phyllis D. Hatcher	37,088	45.5
Total votes		81,454	100.0
Republican hold			

=== District 18 ===
Republican primary
Party	Candidate	Votes	%
Republican	John F. Kennedy (incumbent)	13,027	100
Total votes		13,027	100

Georgia State Senate district 18 general election, 2018
Party	Candidate	Votes	%
Republican	John F. Kennedy (incumbent)	57,935	100.0
Total votes		57,935	100.0
Republican hold			

=== District 19 ===
Republican primary
Party	Candidate	Votes	%
Republican	Blake Tillery (incumbent)	9,926	100
Total votes		9,926	100

Georgia State Senate district 19 general election, 2018
Party	Candidate	Votes	%
Republican	Blake Tillery (incumbent)	43,414	100.0
Total votes		43,414	100.0
Republican hold			

=== District 20 ===
Republican primary
Party	Candidate	Votes	%
Republican	Larry Walker (incumbent)	10,750	100
Total votes		10,750	100

Georgia State Senate district 20 general election, 2018
Party	Candidate	Votes	%
Republican	Larry Walker (incumbent)	57,488	100.0
Total votes		57,488	100.0
Republican hold			

=== District 21 ===
Republican primary
Party	Candidate	Votes	%
Republican	Brandon Beach (incumbent)	13,464	100
Total votes		13,464	100

Democratic primary
Party	Candidate	Votes	%
Democratic	Nicole B. Nash	4,682	100
Total votes		4,682	100

Georgia State Senate district 21 general election, 2018
Party	Candidate	Votes	%
Republican	Brandon Beach (incumbent)	61,554	70.4
Democratic	Nicole B. Nash	25,901	29.6
Total votes		87,455	100.0
Republican hold			

=== District 22 ===
Democratic primary
Party	Candidate	Votes	%
Democratic	Harold V. Jones II (incumbent)	14,700	100
Total votes		14,700	100

Georgia State Senate district 22 general election, 2018
Party	Candidate	Votes	%
Democratic	Harold V. Jones II (incumbent)	48,508	100.0
Total votes		48,508	100.0
Democratic hold			

=== District 23 ===
Republican primary
Party	Candidate	Votes	%
Republican	Jesse Stone (incumbent)	10,649	100
Total votes		10,649	100

Georgia State Senate district 23 general election, 2018
Party	Candidate	Votes	%
Republican	Jesse Stone (incumbent)	48,746	100.0
Total votes		48,746	100.0
Republican hold			

=== District 24 ===
Republican primary
Party	Candidate	Votes	%
Republican	Lee Anderson (incumbent)	16,229	100
Total votes		16,229	100

Georgia State Senate district 24 general election, 2018
Party	Candidate	Votes	%
Republican	Lee Anderson (incumbent)	65,142	100.0
Total votes		65,142	100.0
Republican hold			

=== District 25 ===
Republican primary
Party	Candidate	Votes	%
Republican	Burt Jones (incumbent)	12,588	100
Total votes		12,588	100

Georgia State Senate district 25 general election, 2018
Party	Candidate	Votes	%
Republican	Burt Jones (incumbent)	57,679	100.0
Total votes		57,679	100.0
Republican hold			

=== District 26 ===
Democratic primary
Party	Candidate	Votes	%
Democratic	David E. Lucas, Sr. (incumbent)	12,994	100
Total votes		12,994	100

Georgia State Senate district 26 general election, 2018
Party	Candidate	Votes	%
Democratic	David E. Lucas, Sr. (incumbent)	45,060	100.0
Total votes		45,060	100.0
Democratic hold			

=== District 27 ===
Republican primary
Party	Candidate	Votes	%
Republican	Greg Dolezal	10,770	59.04
Republican	Brian Tam	6,177	24.69
Republican	Bill Fielder	4,071	16.27
Total votes		25,018	100

Democratic primary
Party	Candidate	Votes	%
Democratic	Steve Smith	5,248	100
Total votes		5,248	100

Georgia State Senate district 27 general election, 2018
Party	Candidate	Votes	%
Republican	Greg Dolezal	52,788	56.6
Democratic	Steve Smith	45,905	42.4
Total votes		90,937	100.0
Republican hold			

=== District 28 ===
Republican primary
Party	Candidate	Votes	%
Republican	Matt Brass (incumbent)	12,554	100
Total votes		12,554	100

Georgia State Senate district 28 general election, 2018
Party	Candidate	Votes	%
Republican	Matt Brass (incumbent)	62,887	100.0
Total votes		62,887	100.0
Republican hold			

=== District 29 ===
Democratic primary
Party	Candidate	Votes	%
Democratic	Valerie Haskins	4,915	72.89
Democratic	Ben Anderson	1,828	27.11
Total votes		6,743	100

Republican primary
Party	Candidate	Votes	%
Republican	Randy Robertson	10,045	70.65
Republican	Mayo "Biff" Hadden	4,172	29.35
Total votes		14,217	100

Georgia State Senate district 29 general election, 2018
Party	Candidate	Votes	%
Republican	Randy Robertson	44,149	63.0
Democratic	Valerie Haskins	25,937	37.0
Total votes		70,086	100.0
Republican hold			

=== District 30 ===
Republican primary
Party	Candidate	Votes	%
Republican	Michael Dugan (incumbent)	11,638	100
Total votes		11,638	100

Georgia State Senate district 30 general election, 2018
Party	Candidate	Votes	%
Republican	Michael Dugan (incumbent)	53,299	100.0
Total votes		53,299	100.0
Republican hold			

=== District 31 ===
Republican primary
Party	Candidate	Votes	%
Republican	Bill Heath (incumbent)	10,962	100
Total votes		10,962	100

Georgia State Senate district 31 general election, 2018
Party	Candidate	Votes	%
Republican	Bill Heath (incumbent)	54,948	100.0
Total votes		54,948	100.0
Republican hold			

=== District 32 ===
Republican primary
Party	Candidate	Votes	%
Republican	Kay Kirkpatrick (incumbent)	13,358	100
Total votes		13,358	100

Democratic primary
Party	Candidate	Votes	%
Democratic	Christine Triebsch	9,952	100
Total votes		9,952	100

Georgia State Senate district 32 general election, 2018
Party	Candidate	Votes	%
Republican	Kay Kirkpatrick (incumbent)	52,870	57.4
Democratic	Christine Triebsch	39,288	42.6
Total votes		92,158	100.0
Republican hold			

=== District 33 ===
Democratic primary
Party	Candidate	Votes	%
Democratic	Michael "Doc" Rhett (incumbent)	8,449	100
Total votes		8,449	100

Georgia State Senate district 33 general election, 2018
Party	Candidate	Votes	%
Democratic	Michael "Doc" Rhett (incumbent)	51,724	100.0
Total votes		51,724	100.0
Democratic hold			

=== District 34 ===
Democratic primary
Party	Candidate	Votes	%
Democratic	Valencia Seay (incumbent)	8,985	75.34
Democratic	Melody Totten	2,941	24.66
Total votes		11,926	100

Republican primary
Party	Candidate	Votes	%
Republican	Tommy Smith	2,554	100
Total votes		2,554	100

Georgia State Senate district 34 general election, 2018
Party	Candidate	Votes	%
Democratic	Valencia Seay (incumbent)	49,884	82.9
Republican	Tommy Smith	10,319	17.1
Total votes		60,203	100.0
Democratic hold			

=== District 35 ===
Democratic primary
Party	Candidate	Votes	%
Democratic	Donzella James (incumbent)	10,651	66.65
Democratic	Karen W. Ashley	3,602	22.54
Democratic	Mike Glanton, Jr.	1,728	10.81
Total votes		15,981	100

Georgia State Senate district 35 general election, 2018
Party	Candidate	Votes	%
Democratic	Donzella James (incumbent)	65,277	100.0
Total votes		65,277	100.0
Democratic hold			

=== District 36 ===
Democratic primary
Party	Candidate	Votes	%
Democratic	Nan Orrock (incumbent)	16,337	100
Total votes		16,337	100

Georgia State Senate district 36 general election, 2018
Party	Candidate	Votes	%
Democratic	Nan Orrock (incumbent)	67,326	100.0
Total votes		67,326	100.0
Democratic hold			

=== District 37 ===
Democratic primary
Party	Candidate	Votes	%
Democratic	Andy Clark	6,136	100
Total votes		6,136	100

Republican primary
Party	Candidate	Votes	%
Republican	Lindsey Tippins (incumbent)	10,567	100
Total votes		10,567	100

Georgia State Senate district 37 general election, 2018
Party	Candidate	Votes	%
Republican	Lindsey Tippins (incumbent)	48,464	58.9
Democratic	Andy Clark	33,798	41.1
Total votes		82,262	100.0
Republican hold			

=== District 38 ===
Republican primary
Party	Candidate	Votes	%
Republican	Travis Klavohn	2,492	100
Total votes		2,492	100

Democratic primary
Party	Candidate	Votes	%
Democratic	Horacena Tate (incumbent)	14,435	100
Total votes		14,435	100

Georgia State Senate district 38 general election, 2018
Party	Candidate	Votes	%
Democratic	Horacena Tate (incumbent)	62,275	82.85
Republican	Travis Klavohn	12,892	17.15
Total votes		75,167	100.0
Democratic hold			

=== District 39 ===
Democratic primary
Party	Candidate	Votes	%
Democratic	Nikema Williams (incumbent)	16,784	100
Total votes		16,784	100

Georgia State Senate district 39 general election, 2018
Party	Candidate	Votes	%
Democratic	Nikema Williams (incumbent)	67,293	100.0
Total votes		67,293	100.0
Democratic hold			

=== District 40 ===
Democratic primary
Party	Candidate	Votes	%
Democratic	Sally Harrell	7,519	67.18
Democratic	Tamara Johnson-Shealey	3,673	32.82
Total votes		11,192	100

Republican primary
Party	Candidate	Votes	%
Republican	Fran Millar (incumbent)	7,884	100
Total votes		7,884	100

Georgia State Senate district 40 general election, 2018
Party	Candidate	Votes	%
Democratic	Sally Harrell	40,956	54.8
Republican	Fran Millar (incumbent)	33,842	45.2
Total votes		74,798	100.0
Democratic gain from Republican			

=== District 41 ===
Democratic primary
Party	Candidate	Votes	%
Democratic	Steve Henson (incumbent)	6,928	50.40
Democratic	Sabrina McKenzie	6,817	49.60
Total votes		13,745	100

Georgia State Senate district 41 general election, 2018
Party	Candidate	Votes	%
Democratic	Steve Henson (incumbent)	51,843	100.o
Total votes		51,843	100.0
Democratic hold			

=== District 42 ===
Democratic primary
Party	Candidate	Votes	%
Democratic	Elena Parent (incumbent)	20,822	100
Total votes		20,822	100

Georgia State Senate district 42 general election, 2018
Party	Candidate	Votes	%
Democratic	Elena Parent (incumbent)	72,582	100.0
Total votes		72,582	100.0
Democratic hold			

=== District 43 ===
Democratic primary
Party	Candidate	Votes	%
Democratic	Tonya Anderson (incumbent)	13,099	84.43
Democratic	Joel Thibodeaux	2,415	15.57
Total votes		15,514	100

Georgia State Senate district 43 general election, 2018
Party	Candidate	Votes	%
Democratic	Tonya Anderson (incumbent)	60,152	100.0
Total votes		60,152	100.0
Democratic hold			

=== District 44 ===
Democratic primary
Party	Candidate	Votes	%
Democratic	Gail Davenport (incumbent)	12,818	68.25
Democratic	Sandra Daniels	3,971	21.14
Democratic	Keith Horton	1,993	10.61
Total votes		18,782	100

Georgia State Senate district 44 general election, 2018
Party	Candidate	Votes	%
Democratic	Gail Davenport (incumbent)	67,460	100.0
Total votes		67,460	100.0
Democratic hold			

=== District 45 ===
Democratic primary
Party	Candidate	Votes	%
Democratic	Jana Rodgers	5,849	100
Total votes		5,849	100

Republican primary
Party	Candidate	Votes	%
Republican	Renee Unterman (incumbent)	8,054	100
Total votes		8,054	100

Georgia State Senate district 45 general election, 2018
Party	Candidate	Votes	%
Republican	Renee Unterman (incumbent)	44,313	58.0
Democratic	Jana Rodgers	32,037	42.0
Total votes		76,350	100.0
Republican hold			

=== District 46 ===
Republican primary
Party	Candidate	Votes	%
Republican	Bill Cowsert (incumbent)	12,935	100
Total votes		12,935	100

Democratic primary
Party	Candidate	Votes	%
Democratic	Marisue Hilliard	8,380	100
Total votes		8,380	100

Georgia State Senate district 46 general election, 2018
Party	Candidate	Votes	%
Republican	Bill Cowsert (incumbent)	47,608	60.4
Democratic	Marisue Hilliard	31,242	39.6
Total votes		78,850	100.0
Republican hold			

=== District 47 ===
Republican primary
Party	Candidate	Votes	%
Republican	Frank Ginn (incumbent)	8,616	69.53
Republican	Scott Howard	3,775	30.47
Total votes		12,391	100

Democratic primary
Party	Candidate	Votes	%
Democratic	Dawn Johnson	5,797	100
Total votes		5,797	100

Georgia State Senate district 47 general election, 2018
Party	Candidate	Votes	%
Republican	Frank Ginn (incumbent)	46,019	66.5
Democratic	Dawn Johnson	23,219	33.5
Total votes		69,238	100.0
Republican hold			

=== District 48 ===
Democratic primary
Party	Candidate	Votes	%
Democratic	Zahra Karinshak	6,594	100
Total votes		6,594	100

Republican primary
Party	Candidate	Votes	%
Republican	Matt Reeves	6,233	100
Total votes		6,233	100

Georgia State Senate district 48 general election, 2018
Party	Candidate	Votes	%
Democratic	Zahra Karinshak	35,440	53.6
Republican	Matt Reeves	30,710	46.4
Total votes		66,150	100.0
Democratic gain from Republican			

=== District 49 ===
Republican primary
Party	Candidate	Votes	%
Republican	Cecil T. "Butch" Miller (incumbent)	12,738	100
Total votes		12,738	100

Georgia State Senate district 49 general election, 2018
Party	Candidate	Votes	%
Republican	Cecil T. "Butch" Miller (incumbent)	55,609	100.0
Total votes		55,609	100.0
Republican hold			

=== District 50 ===
Republican primary
Party	Candidate	Votes	%
Republican	John Wilkinson (incumbent)	16,118	100
Total votes		16,118	100

Georgia State Senate district 50 general election, 2018
Party	Candidate	Votes	%
Republican	John Wilkinson (incumbent)	58,971	100.0
Total votes		58,971	100.0
Republican hold			

=== District 51 ===
Republican primary
Party	Candidate	Votes	%
Republican	Steve Gooch (incumbent)	19,724	100
Total votes		19,724	100

Georgia State Senate district 51 general election, 2018
Party	Candidate	Votes	%
Republican	Steve Gooch (incumbent)	69,714	100.0
Total votes		69,714	100.0
Republican hold			

=== District 52 ===
Republican primary
Party	Candidate	Votes	%
Republican	Chuck Hufstetler (incumbent)	10,193	100
Total votes		10,193	100

Democratic primary
Party	Candidate	Votes	%
Democratic	Evan Ross	3,024	100
Total votes		3,024	100

Georgia State Senate district 52 general election, 2018
Party	Candidate	Votes	%
Republican	Chuck Hufstetler (incumbent)	42,492	75.8
Democratic	Evan Ross	13,582	24.2
Total votes		56,074	100.0
Republican hold			

=== District 53 ===
Republican primary
Party	Candidate	Votes	%
Republican	Jeff Mullis (incumbent)	8,849	100
Total votes		8,849	100

Georgia State Senate district 53 general election, 2018
Party	Candidate	Votes	%
Republican	Jeff Mullis (incumbent)	49,168	100.0
Total votes		49,168	100.0
Republican hold			

=== District 54 ===
Democratic primary
Party	Candidate	Votes	%
Democratic	Michael S. Morgan	1,568	100
Total votes		1,568	100

Republican primary
Party	Candidate	Votes	%
Republican	Chuck Payne (incumbent)	5,014	52.86
Republican	J. Scott Tidwell	4,471	47.14
Total votes		9,485	100

Georgia State Senate district 54 general election, 2018
Party	Candidate	Votes	%
Republican	Chuck Payne (incumbent)	39,578	79.65
Democratic	Michael S. Morgan	10,110	20.35
Total votes		49,688	100.0
Republican hold			

=== District 55 ===
Democratic primary
Party	Candidate	Votes	%
Democratic	Gloria Butler (incumbent)	16,414	100
Total votes		16,414	100

Republican primary
Party	Candidate	Votes	%
Republican	Annette Davis Jackson	3,133	100
Total votes		3,133	100

Georgia State Senate district 55 general election, 2018
Party	Candidate	Votes	%
Democratic	Gloria Butler (incumbent)	64,739	81.6
Republican	Annette Davis Jackson	14,639	18.4
Total votes		79,378	100.0
Democratic hold			

=== District 56 ===
Republican primary
Party	Candidate	Votes	%
Republican	John Albers (incumbent)	9,508	100
Total votes		9,508	100

Democratic primary
Party	Candidate	Votes	%
Democratic	Ellyn Jeager	5,393	64.22
Democratic	Patrick Thompson	1,999	23.80
Democratic	Jim Guess, Jr.	1,006	11.98
Total votes		8,398	100

Georgia State Senate district 56 general election, 2018
Party	Candidate	Votes	%
Republican	John Albers (incumbent)	41,874	52.5
Democratic	Ellyn Jeager	37,902	47.5
Total votes		79,776	100.0
Republican hold			

== See also ==
- United States elections, 2018
- United States House of Representatives elections in Georgia, 2018
- Georgia elections, 2018
- Georgia gubernatorial election, 2018
- Georgia lieutenant gubernatorial election, 2018
- Georgia Secretary of State election, 2018
- Georgia House of Representatives election, 2018
- Elections in Georgia (U.S. state)
- List of Georgia state legislatures
