= 2014 Georgia State Senate election =

- November 4, 2014

All 56 seats in the Georgia State Senate 28 (with Lt. Gov.) seats needed for a majority
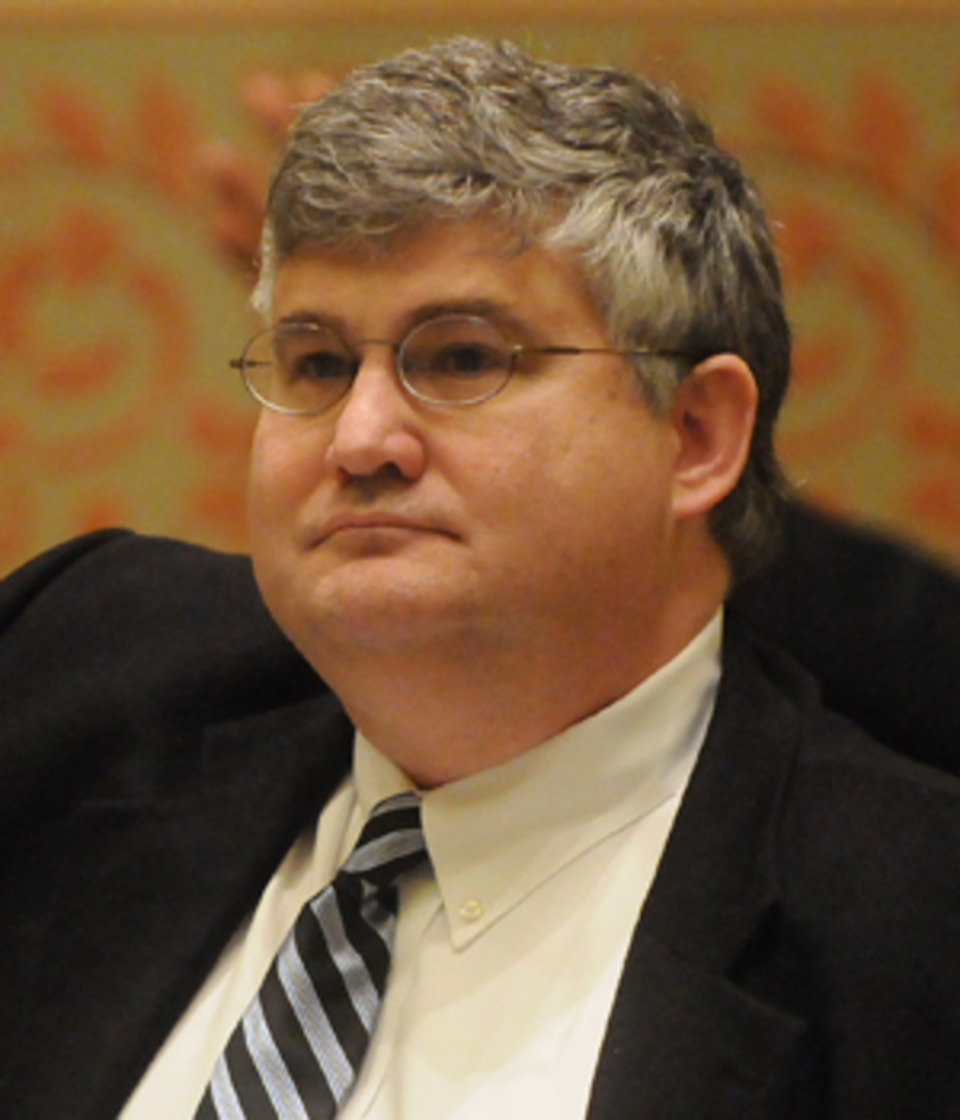

	Majority party	Minority party
Leader	David Shafer	Steve Henson
Party	Republican	Democratic
Leader since	January 14, 2013	June 20, 2011
Leader's seat	District 48	District 41
Last election	38	18
Seats after	38	18
Seat change	Steady	Steady
Popular vote	1,374,263	833,090
Percentage	62.26%	37.74%
President Pro Tempore before election
David Shafer
Republican
Elected President Pro Tempore
David Shafer
Republican

The 2014 Georgia State Senate election was held on November 4, 2014, to determine which party would control the Georgia State Senate for the following two years in the 153rd Georgia General Assembly. All 56 seats in the Georgia State Senate were up for election and the primary occurred on May 20, 2014. Prior to the election, 38 seats were held by Republicans and 18 seats were held by Democrats. The general election saw neither party gain nor lose any seats, meaning that Republicans retained their majority in the State Senate.

== Predictions ==
Source	Ranking	As of
Governing	Safe R	October 20, 2014

== Retirements ==
=== Democrats ===
1. District 22: Hardie Davis retired to successfully run for Mayor of Augusta-Richmond County.
2. District 42: Jason Carter retired to unsuccessfully run for Governor of Georgia.

=== Republicans ===
1. District 1: Buddy Carter retired to successfully run for Georgia's 1st congressional district.
2. District 8: Tim Golden retired.
3. District 13: John Crosby retired.
4. District 16: Ronnie Chance retired.
5. District 18: Cecil Staton retired.

== Defeated incumbents ==
=== In primary ===
==== Democrats ====
1. District 33: Steve Thompson lost renomination to Michael Rhett.

==== Republicans ====
1. District 9: Don Balfour lost renomination to P. K. Martin IV.
2. District 27: Jack Murphy lost renomination to Michael Williams.

== Results ==
=== District 1 ===
District 1 election, 2014
Party	Candidate	Votes	%
Republican	Ben Watson	35,707	100.0%
Total votes		35,707	100.0%
Republican hold			

=== District 2 ===
District 2 election, 2014
Party	Candidate	Votes	%
Democratic	Lester Jackson (incumbent)	31,447	100.0%
Total votes		31,447	100.0%
Democratic hold			

=== District 3 ===
District 3 election, 2014
Party	Candidate	Votes	%
Republican	William Ligon (incumbent)	30,485	100.0%
Total votes		30,485	100.0%
Republican hold			

=== District 4 ===
District 4 election, 2014
Party	Candidate	Votes	%
Republican	Jack Hill (incumbent)	30,345	100.0%
Total votes		30,345	100.0%
Republican hold			

=== District 5 ===
District 5 election, 2014
Party	Candidate	Votes	%
Democratic	Curt Thompson (incumbent)	17,974	100.0%
Total votes		17,974	100.0%
Democratic hold			

=== District 6 ===
District 6 election, 2014
Party	Candidate	Votes	%
Republican	Hunter Hill (incumbent)	29,383	60.85%
Democratic	Antron D. Johnson	18,904	39.15%
Total votes		48,287	100.0%
Republican hold			

=== District 7 ===
District 7 election, 2014
Party	Candidate	Votes	%
Republican	Tyler Harper (incumbent)	28,190	100.0%
Total votes		28,190	100.0%
Republican hold			

=== District 8 ===
District 8 election, 2014
Party	Candidate	Votes	%
Republican	C. Ellis Black	21,345	61.36%
Democratic	Bikram K. Mohanty	13,441	38.64%
Total votes		34,786	100.0%
Republican hold			

=== District 9 ===
District 9 election, 2014
Party	Candidate	Votes	%
Republican	P. K. Martin IV	36,764	66.94%
Democratic	Timothy Andrew Swiney	18,155	33.06%
Total votes		54,919	100.0%
Republican hold			

=== District 10 ===
District 10 election, 2014
Party	Candidate	Votes	%
Democratic	Emanuel Jones (incumbent)	49,120	100.0%
Total votes		49,120	100.0%
Democratic hold			

=== District 11 ===
District 11 election, 2014
Party	Candidate	Votes	%
Republican	Dean Burke (incumbent)	29,867	100.0%
Total votes		29,867	100.0%
Republican hold			

=== District 12 ===
District 12 election, 2014
Party	Candidate	Votes	%
Democratic	Freddie Sims (incumbent)	34,419	100.0%
Total votes		34,419	100.0%
Democratic hold			

=== District 13 ===
District 13 election, 2014
Party	Candidate	Votes	%
Republican	Greg Kirk	32,601	100.0%
Total votes		32,601	100.0%
Republican hold			

=== District 14 ===
District 14 election, 2014
Party	Candidate	Votes	%
Republican	Bruce Thompson (incumbent)	37,011	100.0%
Total votes		37,011	100.0%
Republican hold			

=== District 15 ===
District 15 election, 2014
Party	Candidate	Votes	%
Democratic	Ed Harbison (incumbent)	27,469	100.0%
Total votes		27,469	100.0%
Democratic hold			

=== District 16 ===
District 16 election, 2014
Party	Candidate	Votes	%
Republican	Marty Harbin	44,647	100.0%
Total votes		44,647	100.0%
Republican hold			

=== District 17 ===
District 17 election, 2014
Party	Candidate	Votes	%
Republican	Rick Jeffares (incumbent)	40,436	100.0%
Total votes		40,436	100.0%
Republican hold			

=== District 18 ===
District 18 election, 2014
Party	Candidate	Votes	%
Republican	John F. Kennedy	40,313	100.0%
Total votes		40,313	100.0%
Republican hold			

=== District 19 ===
District 19 election, 2014
Party	Candidate	Votes	%
Republican	Tommie Williams (incumbent)	27,053	100.0%
Total votes		27,053	100.0%
Republican hold			

=== District 20 ===
District 20 election, 2014
Party	Candidate	Votes	%
Republican	Ross Tolleson (incumbent)	32,726	70.19%
Democratic	Sheikh M. Rahman	13,902	29.81%
Total votes		46,628	100.0%
Republican hold			

=== District 21 ===
District 21 election, 2014
Party	Candidate	Votes	%
Republican	Brandon Beach (incumbent)	47,179	100.0%
Total votes		47,179	100.0%
Republican hold			

=== District 22 ===
District 22 election, 2014
Party	Candidate	Votes	%
Democratic	Harold V. Jones II	32,914	100.0%
Total votes		32,914	100.0%
Democratic hold			

=== District 23 ===
District 23 election, 2014
Party	Candidate	Votes	%
Republican	Jesse Stone (incumbent)	27,374	61.09%
Democratic	Diane Brack Evans	17,434	38.91%
Total votes		44,808	100.0%
Republican hold			

=== District 24 ===
District 24 election, 2014
Party	Candidate	Votes	%
Republican	Bill Jackson (incumbent)	37,836	70.94%
Democratic	Brenda J. Jordan	15,501	29.06%
Total votes		53,337	100.0%
Republican hold			

=== District 25 ===
District 25 election, 2014
Party	Candidate	Votes	%
Republican	Burt Jones (incumbent)	39,607	100.0%
Total votes		39,607	100.0%
Republican hold			

=== District 26 ===
District 26 election, 2014
Party	Candidate	Votes	%
Democratic	David Lucas (incumbent)	31,606	100.0%
Total votes		31,606	100.0%
Democratic hold			

=== District 27 ===
District 27 election, 2014
Party	Candidate	Votes	%
Republican	Michael Williams	49,624	100.0%
Total votes		49,624	100.0%
Republican hold			

=== District 28 ===
District 28 election, 2014
Party	Candidate	Votes	%
Republican	Mike Crane (incumbent)	35,440	72.42%
Democratic	Cynthia Conradt Bennett	13,497	27.58%
Total votes		48,937	100.0%
Republican hold			

=== District 29 ===
District 29 election, 2014
Party	Candidate	Votes	%
Republican	Joshua McKoon (incumbent)	30,394	65.98%
Democratic	Brian P. Roslund	15,668	34.02%
Total votes		46,062	100.0%
Republican hold			

=== District 30 ===
District 30 election, 2014
Party	Candidate	Votes	%
Republican	Mike Dugan (incumbent)	31,122	72.51%
Democratic	James Harrison Nixon	11,801	27.49%
Total votes		42,923	100.0%
Republican hold			

=== District 31 ===
District 31 election, 2014
Party	Candidate	Votes	%
Republican	Bill Heath (incumbent)	29,647	73.02%
Democratic	Charles L. R. Winter	10,952	26.98%
Total votes		40,599	100.0%
Republican hold			

=== District 32 ===
District 32 election, 2014
Party	Candidate	Votes	%
Republican	Judson Hill (incumbent)	55,758	100.0%
Total votes		55,758	100.0%
Republican hold			

=== District 33 ===
District 33 election, 2014
Party	Candidate	Votes	%
Democratic	Michael Rhett	30,951	100.0%
Total votes		30,951	100.0%
Democratic hold			

=== District 34 ===
District 34 election, 2014
Party	Candidate	Votes	%
Democratic	Valencia Seay (incumbent)	36,219	100.0%
Total votes		36,219	100.0%
Democratic hold			

=== District 35 ===
District 35 election, 2014
Party	Candidate	Votes	%
Democratic	Donzella James (incumbent)	36,530	74.83%
Republican	Francisco X. R. Artley	12,285	25.17%
Total votes		48,815	100.0%
Democratic hold			

=== District 36 ===
District 36 election, 2014
Party	Candidate	Votes	%
Democratic	Nan Orrock (incumbent)	39,501	100.0%
Total votes		39,501	100.0%
Democratic hold			

=== District 37 ===
District 37 election, 2014
Party	Candidate	Votes	%
Republican	Lindsey Tippins (incumbent)	44,825	100.0%
Total votes		44,825	100.0%
Republican hold			

=== District 38 ===
District 38 election, 2014
Party	Candidate	Votes	%
Democratic	Horacena Tate (incumbent)	42,492	100.0%
Total votes		42,492	100.0%
Democratic hold			

=== District 39 ===
District 39 election, 2014
Party	Candidate	Votes	%
Democratic	Vincent Fort (incumbent)	38,714	83.51%
Republican	Robert W. Tindall	7,642	16.49%
Total votes		46,356	100.0%
Democratic hold			

=== District 40 ===
District 40 election, 2014
Party	Candidate	Votes	%
Republican	Fran Millar (incumbent)	30,705	62.61%
Democratic	Tamara Y. Johnson	18,339	37.39%
Total votes		49,044	100.0%
Republican hold			

=== District 41 ===
District 41 election, 2014
Party	Candidate	Votes	%
Democratic	Steve Henson (incumbent)	32,378	100.0%
Total votes		32,378	100.0%
Democratic hold			

=== District 42 ===
District 42 election, 2014
Party	Candidate	Votes	%
Democratic	Elena Parent	39,791	74.42%
Republican	Gregory E. Williams	13,680	25.58%
Total votes		53,471	100.0%
Democratic hold			

=== District 43 ===
District 43 election, 2014
Party	Candidate	Votes	%
Democratic	Ronald Ramsey Sr. (incumbent)	38,812	100.0%
Total votes		38,812	100.0%
Democratic hold			

=== District 44 ===
District 44 election, 2014
Party	Candidate	Votes	%
Democratic	Gail Davenport (incumbent)	45,385	100.0%
Total votes		45,385	100.0%
Democratic hold			

=== District 45 ===
District 45 election, 2014
Party	Candidate	Votes	%
Republican	Renee Unterman (incumbent)	39,361	100.0%
Total votes		39,361	100.0%
Republican hold			

=== District 46 ===
District 46 election, 2014
Party	Candidate	Votes	%
Republican	Bill Cowsert (incumbent)	38,846	100.0%
Total votes		38,846	100.0%
Republican hold			

=== District 47 ===
District 47 election, 2014
Party	Candidate	Votes	%
Republican	Frank Ginn (incumbent)	33,936	100.0%
Total votes		33,936	100.0%
Republican hold			

=== District 48 ===
District 48 election, 2014
Party	Candidate	Votes	%
Republican	David Shafer (incumbent)	30,445	100.0%
Total votes		30,445	100.0%
Republican hold			

=== District 49 ===
District 49 election, 2014
Party	Candidate	Votes	%
Republican	Butch Miller (incumbent)	37,782	100.0%
Total votes		37,782	100.0%
Republican hold			

=== District 50 ===
District 50 election, 2014
Party	Candidate	Votes	%
Republican	John Wilkinson (incumbent)	36,833	100.0%
Total votes		36,833	100.0%
Republican hold			

=== District 51 ===
District 51 election, 2014
Party	Candidate	Votes	%
Republican	Steve Gooch (incumbent)	44,589	100.0%
Total votes		44,589	100.0%
Republican hold			

=== District 52 ===
District 52 election, 2014
Party	Candidate	Votes	%
Republican	Chuck Hufstetler (incumbent)	30,959	100.0%
Total votes		30,959	100.0%
Republican hold			

=== District 53 ===
District 53 election, 2014
Party	Candidate	Votes	%
Republican	Jeff Mullis (incumbent)	28,771	100.0%
Total votes		28,771	100.0%
Republican hold			

=== District 54 ===
District 54 election, 2014
Party	Candidate	Votes	%
Republican	Charlie Bethel (incumbent)	25,016	100.0%
Total votes		25,016	100.0%
Republican hold			

=== District 55 ===
District 55 election, 2014
Party	Candidate	Votes	%
Democratic	Gloria Butler (incumbent)	44,687	100.0%
Total votes		44,687	100.0%
Democratic hold			

=== District 56 ===
District 56 election, 2014
Party	Candidate	Votes	%
Republican	John Albers (incumbent)	34,734	69.72%
Democratic	Akhtar Sadiq	15,087	30.28%
Total votes		49,821	100.0%
Republican hold			
