= 2018 Georgia lieutenant gubernatorial election =

- November 6, 2018
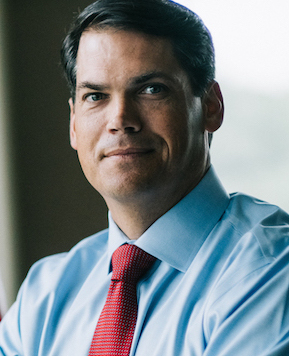

Nominee	Geoff Duncan	Sarah Riggs Amico
Party	Republican	Democratic
Popular vote	1,949,456	1,823,118
Percentage	51.63%	48.37%
- Duncan 50–60% 60–70% 70–80% 80–90% >90% Amico: 40–50% 50–60% 60–70% 70–80% 80–90% >90% Tie: 50% No data
Lieutenant Governor before election
Casey Cagle
Republican
Elected Lieutenant Governor
Geoff Duncan
Republican

The 2018 Georgia lieutenant gubernatorial election was held on November 6, 2018, to elect the lieutenant governor of Georgia, concurrently with the 2018 gubernatorial election, as well as elections to the United States Senate and elections to the United States House of Representatives and various state and local elections.

Then-incumbent Republican lieutenant governor Casey Cagle chose to not run for re-election in order to run for governor.

== Republican primary ==
=== Candidates ===
==== Advanced to runoff ====
- Geoff Duncan, state representative
- David Shafer, state senator

==== Defeated in primary ====
- Rick Jeffares, state senator

==== Declined ====
- Brandon Beach, state senator (endorsed Jeffares)
- Jim Butterworth, former state senator and former adjutant general of the Georgia National Guard
- Casey Cagle, lieutenant governor of Georgia (running for governor)
- Bill Cowsert, Majority Leader of the Georgia State Senate
- Tim Echols, Georgia Public Service Commissioner
- Steve Gooch, state senator (endorsed Jeffares)
- Burt Jones, state senator (endorsed Jeffares)
- Rick Knox
- Butch Miller, state senator (endorsed Shafer)
- Allen Peake, state representative

=== Endorsements ===
Geoff Duncan

U.S. senators

- Marco Rubio, United States Senator from Florida

State representatives

- Michael Caldwell, state representative
- David Clark, state representative
- Allen Peake, state representative

Individuals

- John F. Brock, former Coca-Cola Enterprises CEO
Rick Jeffares

U.S. representatives

- Drew Ferguson, United States Congressman, 3rd district

State senators

- John Albers, state senator
- Brandon Beach, state senator
- Matt Brass, state senator
- Dean Burke, state senator
- Steve Gooch, state senator
- Tyler Harper, state senator
- Burt Jones, state senator
- John F. Kennedy, state senator
- Brian Strickland, state senator
- Blake Tillery, state senator
- Lindsey Tippins, state senator

State representatives

- Dave Belton, state representative
- Shaw Blackmon, state representative
- Geoff Cauble, state representative
- John Corbett, state representative
- Robert Dickey, state representative
- Matt Hatchett, state representative
- David Knight, state representative
- Dominic LaRiccia, state representative
- Jodi Lott, state representative
- Karen Mathiak, state representative
- John Meadows III, state representative
- Chad Nimmer, state representative
- Jay Powell, state representative
- Trey Rhodes, state representative
- Dale Rutledge, state representative
- Jason Shaw, state representative
- Andy Welch, state representative
- Bill Werkheiser, state representative
David Shafer

U.S. senators

- Ted Cruz, United States senator from Texas
- Phil Gramm, former United States senator from Texas
- Mack Mattingly, former United States senator from Georgia
- Rick Santorum, former United States senator from Pennsylvania and candidate for President of the United States in 2012 and 2016

U.S. representatives

- Ben Blackburn, former United States congressman, 4th district
- Mac Collins, former United States congressman, 8th district
- Newt Gingrich, former Speaker of the United States House of Representatives, 6th district
- Barry Goldwater Jr., former United States congressman from California and son of former United States Senator Barry Goldwater
- John Linder, former United States congressman, 7th district
- Fletcher Thompson, former United States congressman, 5th district

State senators

- Lee Anderson, state senator
- C. Ellis Black, state senator
- Mike Dugan, state senator
- Marty Harbin, state senator
- Chuck Hufstetler, state senator
- Greg Kirk, state senator
- Kay Kirkpatrick, state senator
- William Ligon, state senator
- P.K. Martin IV, state senator
- Fran Millar, state senator
- Butch Miller, state senator
- Jeff Mullis, state senator
- Chuck Payne, state senator
- Jesse Stone, state senator
- Bruce Thompson, state senator
- Larry Walker III, state senator
- Ben Watson, state senator
- John Wilkinson, state senator

State representatives

- Mandi Ballinger, state representative
- Paul Battles, state representative
- Tommy Benton, state representative
- Beth Beskin, state representative
- Bruce Boatright, state representative
- Josh Bonner, state representative
- Johnnie Caldwell Jr., state representative
- John Carson, state representative
- Joyce Chandler, state representative
- Sharon Cooper, state representative
- Clay Cox, state representative
- John Deffenbaugh, state representative
- Matt Dollar, state representative
- Matt Dubnik, state representative
- Emory Dunahoo, state representative
- Chuck Efstration, state representative
- Earl Ehrhart, state representative
- Bubber Epps, state representative
- Barry Fleming, state representative
- Rich Golick, state representative
- Micah Gravley, state representative
- Meagan Hanson, state representative
- Buddy Harden, state representative
- Brett Harrell, state representative
- Lee Hawkins, state representative
- Dewayne Hill, state representative
- Scott Hilton, state representative
- Bill Hitchens, state representative
- Don Hogan, state representative
- Susan Holmes, state representative
- Rick Jasperse, state representative
- Jeff Jones, state representative
- Tom Kirby, state representative
- Howard Maxwell, state representative
- Tom McCall, state representative
- Don Parsons, state representative
- Jesse Petrea, state representative
- Alan Powell, state representative
- Paulette Rakestraw, state representative
- Jason Ridley, state representative
- Danae Roberts, state representative
- Terry Rogers, state representative
- Ed Rynders, state representative
- Deborah Silcox, state representative
- Richard Smith, state representative
- Ron Stephens, state representative
- Jan Tankersley, state representative
- Steve Tarvin, state representative
- Tom Taylor, state representative
- Wendell Willard, state representative

Statewide officials

- George P. Bush, Texas Land Commissioner
- Chuck Eaton, Georgia Public Service Commissioner
- Tim Echols, Georgia Public Service Commissioner
- Doug Everett, Georgia Public Service Commissioner
- Mike Huckabee, former governor of Arkansas
- Ralph Hudgens, Georgia Insurance Commissioner
- Bubba McDonald, Georgia Public Service Commissioner
- Stan Wise, Georgia Public Service Commissioner

Organizations

- GeorgiaCarry.org
- NRA Political Victory Fund
- Republican Liberty Caucus

=== Polling ===
Poll source	Date(s) administered	Sample size	Margin of error	Geoff Duncan	Rick Jeffares	David Shafer	Undecided
University of Georgia	April 19–26, 2018	507	± 4.4%	12%	7%	14%	65%

=== Results ===
Primary results by county Shafer: 30–40%; 40–50%; 50–60%; 60–70%; Duncan: 30–40%; 40–50%; Jeffares: 30–40%; 40–50%; 50–60%

Republican primary results
Party	Candidate	Votes	%
Republican	David Shafer	268,221	48.91
Republican	Geoff Duncan	146,163	26.65
Republican	Rick Jeffares	134,047	24.44
Total votes		548,431	100.0

=== Runoff ===
==== Polling ====
Poll source	Date(s) administered	Sample size	Margin of error	Geoff Duncan	David Shafer	Undecided
Rosetta Stone	June 7, 2018	400	± 4.9%	19%	46%	35%

==== Results ====
Primary runoff results by county Duncan: 50–60%; 60–70%; Shafer: 50–60%; 60–70%

Republican primary runoff results
Party	Candidate	Votes	%
Republican	Geoff Duncan	280,465	50.14
Republican	David Shafer	278,868	49.86
Total votes		559,333	100.0

== Democratic primary ==
=== Candidates ===
==== Declared ====
- Sarah Riggs Amico, businesswoman
- Triana Arnold James, small business owner and veteran

==== Declined ====
- Stacey Evans, state representative (running for Governor)
- Ken Hodges, former Dougherty County District Attorney and nominee for attorney general in 2010 (running for the Georgia Court of Appeals)
- Ronnie Mabra, former state representative
- Jon Ossoff, investigative filmmaker
- Doug Stoner, Smyrna City Councilman and former state senator (running for the Public Service Commission)

=== Endorsements ===
Sarah Riggs Amico

Individuals

- Stacey Abrams, Democratic nominee for Governor of Georgia
- Billy Mitchell, state representative
- Barack Obama, 44th president of the United States

Organizations

- AFL-CIO, union
- Georgia Equality, LGBT rights advocacy group
Triana Arnold James
- Teresa Shook, original founder of the Women's March

Primary results by county Amico: 50–60%; 60–70%; 70–80%; 80–90%; James: 50–60%; 60–70%

=== Polling ===
Poll source	Date(s) administered	Sample size	Margin of error	Sarah Amico	Triana James	Undecided
University of Georgia	April 12–18, 2018	473	± 4.5%	10%	20%	70%

=== Results ===
Democratic primary results
Party	Candidate	Votes	%
Democratic	Sarah Riggs Amico	278,662	55.24
Democratic	Triana Arnold James	225,758	44.76
Total votes		504,420	100.0

== General election ==
=== Endorsements ===
Geoff Duncan (R)

State politicians

- Nathan Deal, governor of Georgia

=== Polling ===
Poll source	Date(s) administered	Sample size	Margin of error	Geoff Duncan (R)	Sarah Riggs Amico (D)	Undecided
University of Georgia	September 30 – October 9, 2018	1,232	± 2.8%	45%	39%	15%
Landmark Communications	October 1, 2018	964	± 3.2%	48%	46%	6%
Gravis Marketing	July 27–29, 2018	650	± 3.8%	41%	43%	15%

=== Results ===
2018 Georgia lieutenant gubernatorial election
Party	Candidate	Votes	%	±%
Republican	Geoff Duncan	1,951,738	51.63%	–6.36
Democratic	Sarah Riggs Amico	1,828,566	48.37%	+6.36
Total votes		3,780,304	100.00%	
Republican hold				

==== By congressional district ====
Duncan won nine of 14 congressional districts.

District	Duncan	Riggs Amico	Representative
1st	58%	42%	Buddy Carter
2nd	45%	55%	Sanford Bishop
3rd	65%	35%	Drew Ferguson
4th	21%	79%	Hank Johnson
5th	13%	87%	John Lewis
6th	49.9%	50.1%	Lucy McBath
7th	51%	49%	Rob Woodall
8th	65%	35%	Austin Scott
9th	80%	20%	Doug Collins
10th	63%	37%	Jody Hice
11th	61%	39%	Barry Loudermilk
12th	59%	41%	Rick W. Allen
13th	24%	76%	David Scott
14th	76%	24%	Tom Graves

== Irregularities ==
There was a significant drop-off in votes between the election for governor, which counted 3,939,409 votes, to the lieutenant governor election, with 3,780,304 votes. The undervote, larger than that seen in other statewide races, was found by the Coalition for Good Governance to have occurred in predominantly African American neighborhoods, but only with touchscreen voting machines, not absentee ballots. The change in votes was statistically significant compared to the typical smaller undervote in white areas.
