= 2018 Georgia gubernatorial election =

- November 6, 2018
- Turnout: 56.80% ▲14.55pp
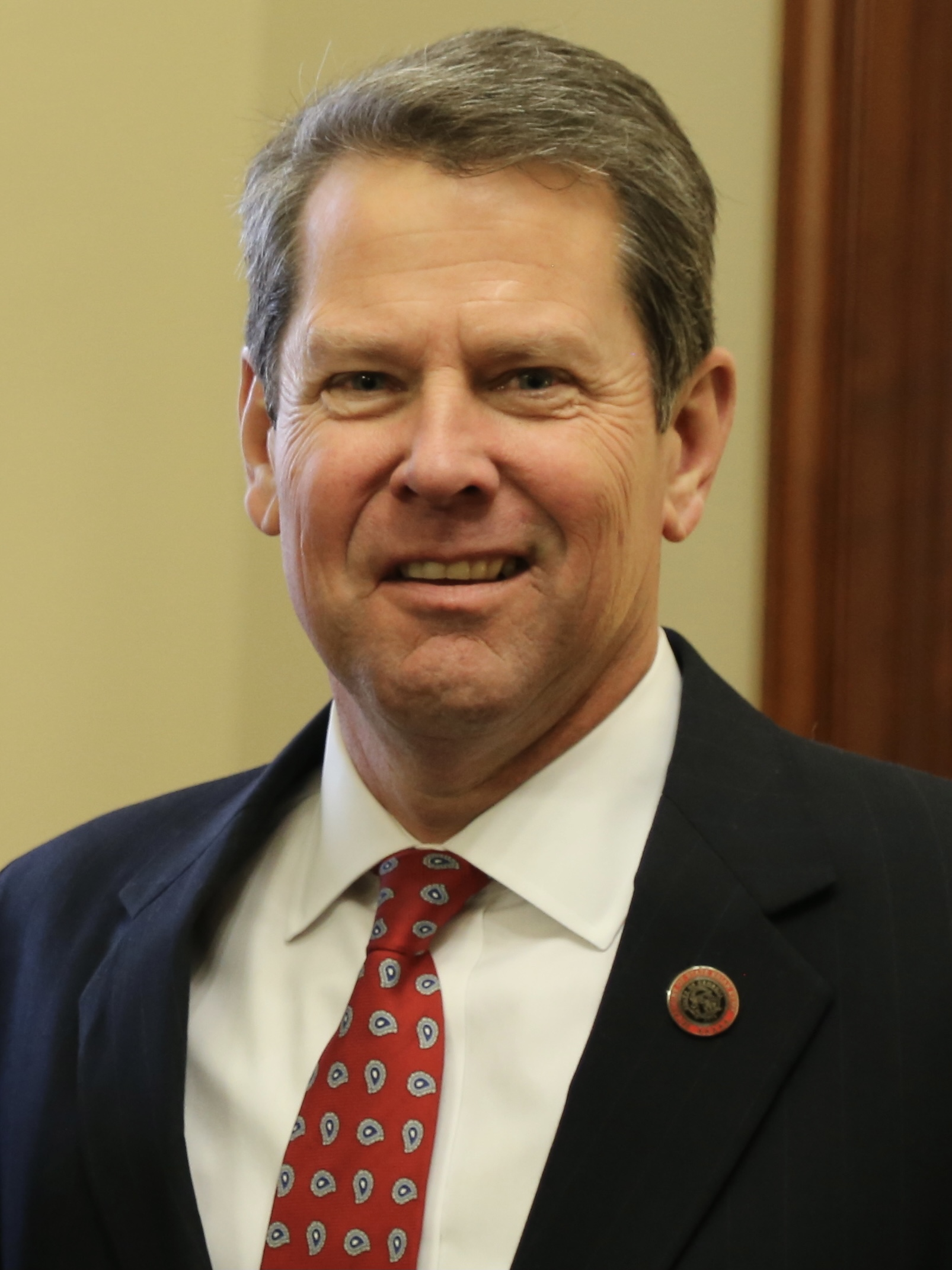

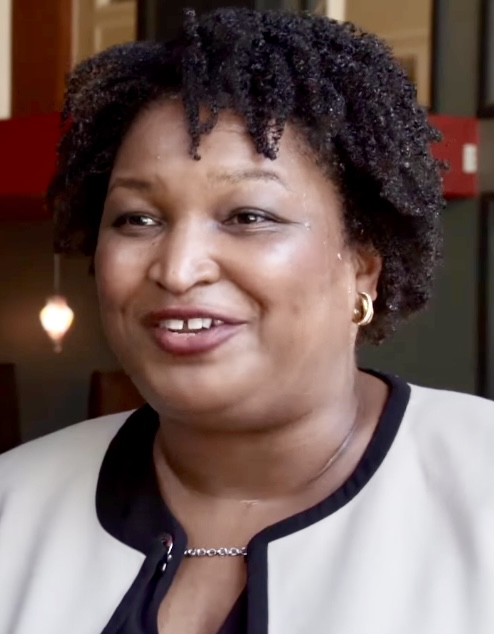
Nominee	Brian Kemp	Stacey Abrams
Party	Republican	Democratic
Popular vote	1,978,408	1,923,685
Percentage	50.22%	48.83%
- Kemp: 40–50% 50–60% 60–70% 70–80% 80–90% >90% Abrams: 40–50% 50–60% 60–70% 70–80% 80–90%
Governor before election
Nathan Deal
Republican
Elected Governor
Brian Kemp
Republican

The 2018 Georgia gubernatorial election was held on Tuesday, November 6, concurrently with other statewide and local elections to elect the next governor of Georgia. Republican candidate and Secretary of State of Georgia Brian Kemp defeated Democratic candidate and former State Representative Stacey Abrams.

The primary elections were held on May 22, 2018, and a primary runoff was held on July 24, 2018, between Republican candidates Kemp and Lieutenant Governor Casey Cagle; Kemp prevailed. Incumbent Republican governor Nathan Deal was term-limited and thus could not seek a third consecutive term. Abrams won the Democratic primary with over 75% of the vote, allowing her to avoid a runoff. Kemp was the sitting secretary of state at the time of the election. His position led to accusations of a conflict of interest, as he oversaw the administration of an election in which he was the candidate.

On November 7, Kemp declared victory over Abrams. The following morning, Kemp resigned as secretary of state. On November 16, every county certified their votes, with Kemp leading by roughly 55,000 votes. Shortly after the election certification, Abrams suspended her campaign; she accepted Kemp as the legal winner of the election while refusing to say that the election was legitimate. Abrams has since made numerous claims of election activity that allegedly unfairly affected the results. Following the election, Abrams and her organization Fair Fight filed a number of lawsuits challenging the constitutionality and Voting Rights Act compliance of Georgia's voting laws.

Kemp prevailed by 54,723 votes, defeating Abrams 50.2–48.8%. Georgia's 2018 gubernatorial election was its closest governor's race since 1966. Kemp was re-elected governor in 2022 in a rematch with Abrams.

== Republican primary ==
=== Candidates ===
==== Nominated ====
- Brian Kemp, secretary of state of Georgia and candidate for agriculture commissioner in 2006

==== Eliminated in the runoff ====
- Casey Cagle, lieutenant governor of Georgia

==== Eliminated in the primary ====
- Hunter Hill, former state senator
- Clay Tippins, consulting firm executive and retired Navy SEAL
- Michael Williams, state senator

==== Withdrew ====
- Marc Alan Urbach, journalist, former teacher and write-in candidate for president of the United States in 2016

==== Declined ====
- Nick Ayers, political strategist and chief of staff to U.S. Vice President Mike Pence
- Burt Jones, state senator
- Josh McKoon, state senator (running for secretary of state)
- David Perdue, U.S. senator
- Sonny Perdue, United States secretary of agriculture and former governor
- Tom Price, former U.S. secretary of health and human services and former U.S. representative
- David Ralston, speaker of the Georgia House of Representatives
- Lynn Westmoreland, former U.S. representative

=== Endorsements ===
Casey Cagle

Governors

- Nathan Deal, governor of Georgia

U.S. senators

- Saxby Chambliss (former)

U.S. representatives

- Phil Gingrey (former)
- Jack Kingston (former)
- Lindsay Thomas (former)
- Lynn Westmoreland (former)

State senators

- John Albers, state senator
- Lee Anderson, state senator
- Brandon Beach, state senator
- C. Ellis Black, state senator
- Matt Brass, state senator
- Dean Burke, state senator
- Mike Dugan, state senator
- Frank Ginn, state senator
- Tim Golden, former state senator
- Steve Gooch, state senator
- Tyler Harper, state senator
- Jack Hill, state senator
- Chuck Hufstetler, state senator
- Burt Jones, state senator
- John Kennedy, state senator
- Greg Kirk, state senator
- Kay Kirkpatrick, state senator
- P.K. Martin, state senator
- Fran Millar, state senator
- Butch Miller, state senator
- Jeff Mullis, state senator
- Jack Murphy, former state senator
- Jesse Stone, state senator
- Renee Unterman, state senator
- Larry Walker III, state senator
- Ben Watson, state senator
- John Wilkinson, state senator

State representatives

- John Deffenbaugh, state representative
- Dewayne Hill, state representative
- Marc Morris, state representative
- Ron Stephens, state representative

Individuals

- Steve Forbes

Organizations

- National Rifle Association of America
Hunter Hill

U.S. senators

- Ted Cruz, United States senator from Texas

State representatives

- Michael Caldwell, state representative
- Wes Cantrell, state representative

U.S. representatives

- Barry Loudermilk (GA-11)
Clay Tippins

State representatives

- Allen Peake, state representative
Michael Williams

Individuals

- Duane Chapman, better known as "Dog the Bounty Hunter"
- Darrell C. Scott, co-founder, National Diversity Coalition for Trump
- Roger Stone, political consultant and Donald Trump advisor

=== First round ===
==== Polling ====
Poll source	Date(s) administered	Sample size	Margin of error	Casey Cagle	Hunter Hill	Brian Kemp	Clay Tippins	Michael Williams	Other	Undecided
Opinion Savvy	May 15–16, 2018	515	± 4.3%	31%	14%	20%	12%	5%	4%	15%
SurveyUSA	May 10–15, 2018	558	± 5.1%	35%	10%	17%	8%	3%	–	27%
University of Georgia	April 19–26, 2018	507	± 4.4%	41%	9%	10%	4%	3%	1%	33%
Meeting Street Research (R-Citizens for Georgia's Future)	March 1 and 3–4, 2018	500	± 4.4%	38%	10%	10%	3%	2%	3%	35%
Clarion Research (R-Hill)	March 2–3, 2018	547	± 4.5%	48%	21%	15%	8%	7%	–	–
Mason-Dixon	February 20–23, 2018	500	± 4.5%	27%	11%	13%	12%	5%	1%	31%
Meeting Street Research (R-Citizens for Georgia's Future)	February 6–7, 2018	500	± 4.4%	31%	7%	12%	5%	2%	3%	40%
The Wickers Group (R-Kemp)	October 21–24, 2017	400	± 4.5%	34%	1%	13%	0%	1%	–	48%
Landmark/Rosetta Stone	October 16–17, 2017	800	± 3.5%	35%	9%	7%	1%	4%	–	44%
McLaughlin & Associates (R-Cagle)	September 28 – October 1, 2017	600	± 4.0%	41%	4%	12%	2%	3%	–	39%

==== Results ====
Initial primary results by county: Cagle—50–60% Cagle—40–50% Cagle—<40% Kemp—<40% Kemp—40–50% Kemp—50–60% Hill—<40% Tie

Republican primary results
Party	Candidate	Votes	%
Republican	Casey Cagle	236,987	38.95
Republican	Brian Kemp	155,189	25.51
Republican	Hunter Hill	111,464	18.32
Republican	Clay Tippins	74,182	12.19
Republican	Michael Williams	29,619	4.87
Republican	Eddie Hayes	939	0.15
Total votes		608,380	100

=== Runoff ===
Casey Cagle and Brian Kemp advanced to a runoff on July 24, 2018, since neither candidate amassed over 50% of the vote in the May 22 primary. On July 18, 2018, President Trump tweeted his support for Kemp, and Vice President Pence traveled to Georgia to campaign with him on July 20, 2018.

==== Polling ====
Poll source	Date(s) administered	Sample size	Margin of error	Casey Cagle	Brian Kemp	Undecided
Trafalgar Group (R)	July 21–22, 2018	1,177	± 2.7%	41%	59%	0%
SurveyUSA	July 15–19, 2018	688	± 4.7%	34%	40%	26%
Opinion Savvy	July 17–18, 2018	466	± 4.5%	37%	55%	8%
University of Georgia	July 5–12, 2018	769	± 3.5%	41%	44%	15%
Public Opinion Strategies (R-Kemp)	June 26–28, 2018	500	± 4.0%	45%	45%	–
Cygnal	June 26–27, 2018	812	± 3.4%	44%	43%	14%
Rosetta Stone	June 7, 2018	400	± 4.9%	48%	41%	12%
McLaughlin & Associates (R-Cagle)	May 29–31, 2018	500	± 4.5%	52%	42%	5%
Public Opinion Strategies (R-Kemp)	May 29–31, 2018	600	± 4.0%	46%	45%	9%

==== Debates ====
Dates	Location	Kemp	Cagle	Link
July 6, 2018	Augusta, Georgia	Participant	Participant	Full debate: Video on YouTube

==== Results ====
Brian Kemp easily won the runoff by nearly 40 points, despite the latest polls having him up by no more than 18. Cagle won only two counties, Monroe and Stephens.

Runoff results by county: Kemp—80–90% Kemp—70–80% Kemp—60–70% Kemp—50–60% Cagle—50–60% Cagle—60–70%

Republican primary runoff results
Party	Candidate	Votes	%
Republican	Brian Kemp	408,595	69.45
Republican	Casey Cagle	179,712	30.55
Total votes		588,307	100.0

== Democratic primary ==
=== Candidates ===
==== Nominated ====
- Stacey Abrams, former state representative and former minority leader of the Georgia House of Representatives

==== Eliminated in the primary ====
- Stacey Evans, attorney and former state representative

==== Declined ====
- John Barrow, former U.S. representative (running for secretary of state)
- Jason Carter, former state senator, nominee for governor in 2014 and grandson of former President Jimmy Carter
- Kasim Reed, former mayor of Atlanta
- Teresa Tomlinson, mayor of Columbus
- Sally Yates, former U.S. deputy attorney general

=== Endorsements ===
Stacey Abrams

Federal politicians

- Cory Booker, U.S. senator (D-NJ)
- Kamala Harris, U.S. senator (D-CA)
- Hank Johnson, U.S. representative (D-GA)
- John Lewis, U.S. representative (D-GA) and prominent civil rights movement leader
- Bernie Sanders, U.S. senator (I-VT)
- David Scott, U.S. representative (D-GA)

Statewide and local politicians

- Kimberly Alexander, state representative
- Tonya Anderson, state senator
- Debra Bazemore, state representative
- Sharon Beasley-Teague, state representative
- Karen Bennett, state representative
- Rhonda Burnough, state representative
- Darrel Bush Ealum, state representative
- Park Cannon, state representative
- Gail Davenport, state senator
- Pam Dickerson, state representative
- Gloria Frazier, state representative
- Carl Gilliard, state representative
- Andrew Gillum, mayor of Tallahassee, Florida; candidate for governor in 2018
- J. Craig Gordon, state representative
- Ed Harbison, state senator
- Carolyn Hugley, state representative
- Brenda Lopez, state representative
- Pedro Marin, state representative
- Dewey McClain, state representative
- Howard Mosby, state representative
- Nan Orrock, state senator
- Miriam Paris, state representative
- Sam Park, state representative
- Dexter Sharper, state representative
- Pam Stephenson, state representative
- Al Williams, state representative

Individuals

- Bill Clinton, 42nd president of the United States
- Hillary Clinton, 2016 Democratic nominee for president, former secretary of state, former senator from New York, former First Lady of the United States
- Wendy Davis, former Texas state senator and nominee for governor in Texas in 2014
- Will Ferrell, comedian and actor
- Valerie Jarrett, former director of the Office of Public Engagement and Intergovernmental Affairs
- Jason Kander, former Missouri secretary of state and nominee for U.S. Senate in Missouri in 2016
- Rev. Joseph Lowery, prominent civil movement leader and United Methodist Church minister
- Barack Obama, 44th president of the United States
- Nina Turner, president of Our Revolution and former Ohio state senator
- Oprah Winfrey, media mogul and talk show host

Labor unions

- American Federation of Government Employees District 5
- Building and Construction Trades Department, AFL–CIO
- Georgia Association of Educators
- Georgia State AFL–CIO
- International Brotherhood of Electrical Workers Local 613
- International Union of Operating Engineers Local 926
- International Union of Painters and Allied Trades District Council 77
- Southeast Council of Retail, Wholesale and Department Store Union

Organizations

- Americans for Responsible Solutions/GiffordsPAC
- Democracy for America
- EMILY's List
- Higher Heights for America
- Let America Vote
- Mijente, a digital and grassroots group for Latino and Chicano movement building and organizing
- Moveon.org
- NARAL Pro-Choice America
- Our Revolution
- Planned Parenthood Action Fund
- The Working Families Party

Websites and newspapers

- Daily Kos
Stacey Evans

Federal politicians

- Max Cleland, former U.S. senator (D-GA)
- Buddy Darden, former U.S. representative

Statewide politicians

- Roy Barnes, former governor

State legislators

- LaDawn Blackett Jones, former state representative
- Roger Bruce, state representative
- David Dreyer, state representative
- Virgil Fludd, former state representative
- Vincent Fort, former state senator
- Spencer Frye, state representative
- Sheila Jones, state representative
- Dar'shun Kendrick, state representative
- Ronnie Mabra, former state representative
- Elena Parent, state senator
- Michael Rhett, state senator
- Michael Smith, state representative
- Erica Thomas, state representative
- Keisha Waites, state representative
- Earnest "Coach" Williams, state representative

Local politicians

- Sherry Boston, DeKalb County district attorney

=== Polling ===
Poll source	Date(s) administered	Sample size	Margin of error	Stacey Abrams	Stacey Evans	Undecided
Opinion Savvy	May 15–16, 2018	522	± 4.3%	58%	19%	23%
SurveyUSA	May 10–15, 2018	475	± 6.2%	43%	24%	33%
20/20 Insight (D-Evans)	May 9–15, 2018	433	± 5.4%	42%	34%	25%
University of Georgia	April 12–18, 2018	473	± 4.5%	33%	15%	52%
Mason-Dixon	February 20–23, 2018	500	± 4.5%	29%	17%	54%

=== Results ===
Primary results by county: Abrams—80–90% Abrams—70–80% Abrams—60–70% Abrams—50–60% Evans—50–60% Evans—60–70%

Democratic primary results
Party	Candidate	Votes	%
Democratic	Stacey Abrams	424,305	76.44
Democratic	Stacey Evans	130,784	23.56
Total votes		555,089	100.0

== Libertarian primary ==
=== Candidates ===
==== Declared ====
- Ted Metz, chair of the Libertarian Party of Georgia

==== Withdrew ====
- Doug Craig, former chair of the Libertarian Party of Georgia

== General election ==
If no candidate had gained a simple majority of the votes in the general election, a runoff election between the top two candidates would have been held on December 4, 2018.

=== Debates ===
Dates	Location	Kemp	Abrams	Metz	Link
October 23, 2018	Atlanta, Georgia	Participant	Participant	Participant	Full debate - C-SPAN

- A second debate was scheduled for November 4, 2018 (two days before Election Day), but it was canceled when Kemp pulled out of the schedule in order to attend a rally for President Donald Trump. The Kemp campaign sent multiple other dates, but the Abrams campaign declined, due to a full schedule.

=== Predictions ===
Source	Ranking	As of
The Cook Political Report	Tossup	October 26, 2018
The Washington Post	Tossup	November 5, 2018
FiveThirtyEight	Lean R	November 5, 2018
Rothenberg Political Report	Tilt R	November 1, 2018
Sabato's Crystal Ball	Tossup	November 5, 2018
RealClearPolitics	Tossup	November 4, 2018
Daily Kos	Tossup	November 5, 2018
Fox News (Note: The Fox News Midterm Power Rankings uniquely does not contain a category for Safe/Solid races.)	Tossup	November 5, 2018
Politico	Tossup	November 5, 2018
Governing	Tossup	November 5, 2018

=== Endorsements ===
Stacey Abrams (D)

Former U.S. executive branch officials

- Joe Biden, 47th vice president of the United States and former U.S. Senator (D-DE)
- Jimmy Carter, 39th president of the United States and 76th governor of Georgia
- Bill Clinton, 42nd president of the United States and 40th and 42nd governor of Arkansas
- Hillary Clinton, 2016 Democratic nominee for president of the United States, 67th secretary of state, former senator from New York, former First Lady of the United States
- Eric Holder, 82nd U.S. attorney general
- Valerie Jarrett, former director of the Office of Public Engagement and Intergovernmental Affairs
- Barack Obama, 44th president of the United States and former U.S. senator (D-IL)
- Sally Yates, 36th U.S. deputy attorney general
- Andrew Young, former U.S. ambassador to the United Nations and former mayor of Atlanta

Federal politicians

- Sanford Bishop, U.S. representative (D-GA)
- Cory Booker, U.S. senator (D-NJ)
- Max Cleland, former U.S. senator (D-GA)
- Kirsten Gillibrand, U.S. senator (D-NY)
- Kamala Harris, U.S. senator (D-CA)
- Hank Johnson, U.S. representative (D-GA)
- Doug Jones, U.S. senator (D-AL)
- Joe Kennedy, U.S. representative (D-MA)
- John Lewis, U.S. representative (D-GA) and prominent civil rights movement leader
- Grace Meng, U.S. representative (D-NY)
- Jeff Merkley, U.S. senator (D-OR)
- Seth Moulton, U.S. representative (D-MA)
- Tom Perriello, former U.S. representative (D-VA)
- Bernie Sanders, U.S. senator (I-VT)
- David Scott, U.S. Representative (D-GA)
- Terri Sewell, U.S. representative (D-AL)
- Elizabeth Warren, U.S. senator (D-MA)

Statewide and local politicians

- Kimberly Alexander, state representative
- Tonya Anderson, state senator
- Roy Barnes, former governor of Georgia
- Debra Bazemore, state representative
- Sharon Beasley-Teague, state representative
- Karen Bennett, state representative
- Rhonda Burnough, state representative
- Darrel Bush Ealum, state representative
- Park Cannon, state representative
- Jason Carter, former state senator and nominee for governor in 2014
- Gail Davenport, state senator
- Pam Dickerson, state representative
- Gloria Frazier, state representative
- Eric Garcetti, mayor of Los Angeles
- Carl Gilliard, state representative
- J. Craig Gordon, state representative
- Ed Harbison, state senator
- Carolyn Hugley, state representative
- Shelly Hutchinson, state representative
- Keisha Lance Bottoms, mayor of Atlanta
- Brenda Lopez, state representative
- Pedro Marin, state representative
- Dewey McClain, state representative
- Howard Mosby, state representative
- Nan Orrock, state senator
- Miriam Paris, state representative
- Sam Park, state representative
- Ayanna Pressley, member of the Boston City Council
- Dexter Sharper, state representative
- Pam Stephenson, state representative
- Al Williams, state representative

Individuals

- 2 Chainz, rapper
- Kandi Burruss, singer and actress
- John Carlos, former Olympic athlete
- Common, rapper and actor
- Wendy Davis, former Texas state senator and nominee for governor in Texas in 2014
- Joshua DuBois, political commentator
- Justin Fairfax, lieutenant governor of Virginia
- Will Ferrell, actor and comedian
- Andrew Gillum, mayor of Tallahassee, Florida; candidate for governor in 2018
- Tiffany Haddish, actress
- John Hickenlooper, governor of Colorado
- Keri Hilson, singer and actress
- Letitia James, New York City public advocate
- Rashida Jones, actress and filmmaker
- Jason Kander, former Missouri secretary of state and nominee for U.S. Senate in Missouri in 2016
- Michelle Kwan, former figure skater
- John Legend, singer-songwriter
- Kenny Leon, director
- Rev. Joseph Lowery, prominent civil movement leader and United Methodist Church minister
- Ludacris, rapper and actor
- Terry McAuliffe, former governor of Virginia
- Monica, singer and actress
- Martin O'Malley, former governor of Maryland
- Tom Perez, chair of the DNC
- Amy Poehler, actress
- Kelly Rowland, singer
- Kendrick Sampson, actor
- Amy Schumer, actress
- Jussie Smollett, actor
- Tara Strong, voice actress and activist
- Kara Swisher, journalist
- Holland Taylor, actress
- Kenan Thompson, actor and comedian
- Nina Turner, president of Our Revolution and former Ohio state senator
- Carl Weathers, actor
- Oprah Winfrey, television personality

Labor unions

- American Federation of Government Employees District 5
- Building and Construction Trades Department, AFL–CIO
- Georgia Association of Educators
- Georgia State AFL–CIO
- International Brotherhood of Electrical Workers Local 613
- International Union of Operating Engineers Local 926
- International Union of Painters and Allied Trades District Council 77
- Southeast Council of Retail, Wholesale and Department Store Union

Organizations

- Americans for Responsible Solutions/GiffordsPAC
- Black Economic Alliance
- Democracy for America
- EMILY's List
- End Citizens United
- Higher Heights for America
- Human Rights Campaign
- Let America Vote
- Mijentes, a digital and grassroots group for Latino and Chicano movement building and organizing
- Moveon.org
- NARAL Pro-Choice America
- Our Revolution
- Planned Parenthood Action Fund
- Sierra Club
- The Working Families Party

Websites and newspapers

- Daily Kos
Brian Kemp (R)

U.S. executive branch officials

- Randy Evans, U.S. ambassador to Luxembourg
- Mike Pence, vice president of the United States
- Donald Trump, president of the United States

U.S. senators

- Johnny Isakson (R-GA)
- David Perdue (R-GA)
- Marco Rubio (R-FL)

U.S. representatives

- Rick W. Allen, U.S. representative (GA-12)
- Bob Barr, former U.S. representative (GA-7)
- Buddy Carter, U.S. representative (GA-01)
- Doug Collins, U.S. representative (GA-09)
- Drew Ferguson, U.S. representative (GA-03)
- Newt Gingrich, former U.S. representative (GA-6), former speaker of the U.S. House of Representatives
- Tom Graves, U.S. representative (GA-14)
- Karen Handel, U.S. representative (GA-6), former Georgia secretary of state
- Jody Hice, U.S. representative (GA-10)
- Barry Loudermilk, U.S. representative (GA-11)
- Austin Scott, U.S. representative (GA-08)
- Rob Woodall, U.S. representative (GA-07)

State politicians

- Rick Austin, mayor of Demorest
- Ames Barnett, mayor of Washington
- Keith Brady, mayor of Newnan
- Casey Cagle, lieutenant governor of Georgia and former gubernatorial candidate
- Wes Cantrell, state representative
- David Clark, state representative
- Dan Curry, mayor of Loganville
- Bill Darsey, mayor of Lakeland
- Nathan Deal, governor of Georgia
- Steve Edwards, mayor of Sugar Hill
- Steve Fry, mayor of Williamson
- John Gayle, mayor of Valdosta
- John Harley, mayor of Centerville
- Hunter Hill, former state senator and former candidate for governor
- Susan Holmes, state representative
- Ralph Hudgens, Georgia insurance commissioner
- Charles Ivey, mayor of Watkinsville
- Nancy Jester, DeKalb County commissioner
- Jan Jones, mayor of Sasser
- Jan Jones, state representative, speaker pro tempore of the Georgia House of Representatives
- David Earl Keith, mayor of Jesup
- Ken Lee, mayor of Rincon
- Lamar Lee, mayor of Walnut Grove
- Lee Moore, mayor of Franklin Springs
- Peggy Murphy, mayor of Alma
- Roy Plott, mayor of Jefferson
- Johnny Pritchett, mayor of Bishop
- Jeff Reese, mayor of Villa Rica
- Vic Reynolds, Cobb County district attorney
- Michael Richbourg, mayor of Nashville
- Jefferson Riley, mayor of Mansfield
- Walter Rocker, mayor of Eatonton
- JD Stallings, mayor of Thomaston
- Sam Teasley, state representative
- Stephen Tingen, mayor of Gray
- Clay Tippins, retired Navy SEAL and former gubernatorial candidate
- Kenneth Turner, mayor of Gordon
- Patricia Wheeler, mayor of Stone Mountain
- Mike Young, mayor of McRae-Helena

Organizations

- Georgia Hunting and Fishing Federation
- Georgia Log Cabin Republicans
- GeorgiaCarry.org
- National Federation of Independent Business
- National Rifle Association of America

Individuals

- Herman Cain, former presidential candidate
- Vince Dooley, former University of Georgia head football coach and athletic director
- Erick Erickson, former member of the Macon City Council and conservative radio host and blogger
- Laura Loomer, internet personality, political activist, and investigative journalist
- Ralph Reed, former chairman of the Georgia Republican Party, candidate for lieutenant governor of Georgia and Christian activist
- Herschel Walker, former college and professional football player

Newspapers

- The Augusta Chronicle
- The Brunswick News
- Marietta Daily Journal
- Rome News-Tribune
- Savannah Morning News

=== Polling ===
View source data.

Poll source	Date(s) administered	Sample size	Margin of error	Brian Kemp (R)	Stacey Abrams (D)	Ted Metz (L)	Other	Undecided
The Trafalgar Group (R)	October 30 – November 3, 2018	2,171	± 2.1%	52%	40%	–	4%	4%
20/20 Insight (D-Southern Majority)	October 31 – November 2, 2018	614	± 4.0%	46%	50%	1%	–	3%
Emerson College	October 29–31, 2018	724	± 3.7%	49%	47%	1%	–	2%
Cygnal (R)	October 27–30, 2018	504	± 4.4%	49%	47%	4%	–	0%
University of Georgia	October 21–30, 2018	1,091	± 3.0%	47%	47%	2%	–	5%
Opinion Savvy	October 28–29, 2018	623	± 3.9%	47%	48%	2%	–	3%
Opinion Savvy	October 21–22, 2018	824	± 3.4%	48%	48%	1%	–	3%
Marist College	October 14–18, 2018	554 LV	± 4.8%	46%	45%	4%	<1%	4%
Marist College	October 14–18, 2018	554 LV	± 4.8%	49%	47%	–	1%	4%
Marist College	October 14–18, 2018	864 RV	± 3.8%	44%	46%	4%	<1%	6%
Marist College	October 14–18, 2018	864 RV	± 3.8%	47%	47%	–	1%	5%
Ipsos	October 4–11, 2018	1,088	± 3.4%	47%	46%	2%	1%	4%
University of Georgia	September 30 – October 9, 2018	1,232	± 2.8%	48%	46%	2%	–	4%
SurveyUSA	October 3–8, 2018	655	± 4.9%	47%	45%	–	2%	6%
Public Policy Polling (D-Georgia Engaged)	October 5–6, 2018	729	± 3.0%	46%	46%	–	–	7%
Landmark Communications	October 1, 2018	964	± 3.2%	48%	46%	2%	–	3%
SurveyMonkey	September 9–24, 2018	1,955	± 3.0%	43%	43%	–	–	14%
Garin-Hart-Yang (D-Abrams)	September 17–20, 2018	603	± 4.1%	42%	48%	3%	–	7%
University of Georgia	August 26 – September 4, 2018	1,020	± 3.1%	45%	45%	2%	–	8%
Gravis Marketing	July 27–29, 2018	650	± 3.8%	44%	46%	–	–	10%
SurveyUSA	July 15–19, 2018	1,199	± 4.3%	46%	44%	–	–	10%
Garin-Hart-Yang (D-Abrams)	May 23–25, 2018	601	± 4.0%	40%	49%	–	–	–
Mason-Dixon	February 20–23, 2018	625	± 4.0%	37%	40%	–	–	23%

Hypothetical polling

with Casey Cagle

Poll source	Date(s) administered	Sample size	Margin of error	Casey Cagle (R)	Stacey Abrams (D)	Undecided
SurveyUSA	July 15–19, 2018	1,199	± 4.3%	45%	43%	12%
Garin-Hart-Yang (D-Abrams)	May 23–25, 2018	601	± 4.0%	43%	48%	–
SurveyUSA	May 10–15, 2018	2,339	± 3.5%	46%	41%	14%
Mason-Dixon	February 20–23, 2018	625	± 4.0%	45%	39%	16%

with Clay Tippins

Poll source	Date(s) administered	Sample size	Margin of error	Clay Tippins (R)	Stacey Abrams (D)	Undecided
Mason-Dixon	February 20–23, 2018	625	± 4.0%	40%	41%	19%

with Hunter Hill

Poll source	Date(s) administered	Sample size	Margin of error	Hunter Hill (R)	Stacey Abrams (D)	Undecided
Mason-Dixon	February 20–23, 2018	625	± 4.0%	37%	43%	20%

with Stacey Evans

Poll source	Date(s) administered	Sample size	Margin of error	Casey Cagle (R)	Stacey Evans (D)	Undecided
SurveyUSA	May 10–15, 2018	2,339	± 3.5%	45%	41%	13%
Mason-Dixon	February 20–23, 2018	625	± 4.0%	47%	38%	15%

Poll source	Date(s) administered	Sample size	Margin of error	Brian Kemp (R)	Stacey Evans (D)	Undecided
Mason-Dixon	February 20–23, 2018	625	± 4.0%	42%	39%	19%

Poll source	Date(s) administered	Sample size	Margin of error	Clay Tippins (R)	Stacey Evans (D)	Undecided
Mason-Dixon	February 20–23, 2018	625	± 4.0%	41%	38%	21%

Poll source	Date(s) administered	Sample size	Margin of error	Hunter Hill (R)	Stacey Evans (D)	Undecided
Mason-Dixon	February 20–23, 2018	625	± 4.0%	35%	36%	29%

with Casey Cagle

Poll source	Date(s) administered	Sample size	Margin of error	Casey Cagle (R)	Jason Carter (D)	Undecided
Public Policy Polling	May 27–30, 2016	724	± 3.6%	40%	39%	21%

Poll source	Date(s) administered	Sample size	Margin of error	Casey Cagle (R)	Kasim Reed (D)	Undecided
Public Policy Polling	May 27–30, 2016	724	± 3.6%	46%	33%	21%

with Brian Kemp

Poll source	Date(s) administered	Sample size	Margin of error	Brian Kemp (R)	Jason Carter (D)	Undecided
Public Policy Polling	May 27–30, 2016	724	± 3.6%	38%	40%	22%

Poll source	Date(s) administered	Sample size	Margin of error	Brian Kemp (R)	Kasim Reed (D)	Undecided
Public Policy Polling	May 27–30, 2016	724	± 3.6%	43%	33%	24%

=== Results ===
2018 Georgia gubernatorial election
Party	Candidate	Votes	%	±%
Republican	Brian Kemp	1,978,408	50.22%	−2.52%
Democratic	Stacey Abrams	1,923,685	48.83%	+3.95%
Libertarian	Ted Metz	37,235	0.95%	−1.41%
Write-in		81	0.00%	-0.02%
Total votes		3,939,409	100.00%	N/A
Republican hold				

==== By county ====
Gwinnett and Cobb counties voted Democratic for the first time since 1986.

County	Brian Kemp Republican		Stacey Abrams Democratic		Ted Metz Libertarian		Total votes
County	%	#	%	#	%	#	Total votes
Appling	79.72%	5,428	19.94%	1,358	0.34%	23	6,809
Atkinson	74.39%	1,876	25.26%	637	0.36%	9	2,522
Bacon	86.71%	3,321	12.77%	489	0.52%	20	3,830
Baker	58.24%	753	41.38%	535	0.39%	5	1,293
Baldwin	49.47%	7,735	49.84%	7,793	0.69%	108	15,636
Banks	89.75%	6,150	9.41%	645	0.83%	57	6,852
Barrow	73.57%	20,162	25.18%	6,900	1.25%	343	27,405
Bartow	76.09%	28,425	22.82%	8,524	1.10%	410	37,359
Ben Hill	63.80%	3,539	35.75%	1,983	0.45%	25	5,547
Berrien	85.00%	5,314	14.40%	900	0.61%	38	6,252
Bibb	38.27%	23,225	61.07%	37,066	0.66%	401	60,692
Bleckley	78.52%	3,816	20.62%	1,002	0.86%	42	4,860
Brantley	91.29%	5,198	8.10%	461	0.61%	35	5,694
Brooks	61.36%	3,511	38.24%	2,188	0.40%	23	5,722
Bryan	70.12%	10,507	28.78%	4,313	1.10%	165	14,985
Bulloch	62.69%	14,848	36.44%	8,630	0.87%	205	23,683
Burke	50.57%	4,410	48.95%	4,269	0.48%	42	8,721
Butts	71.74%	6,358	27.65%	2,451	0.61%	54	8,863
Calhoun	42.65%	810	57.08%	1,084	0.26%	5	1,899
Camden	65.29%	11,139	33.57%	5,727	1.14%	195	17,061
Candler	72.34%	2,560	27.21%	963	0.45%	16	3,539
Carroll	69.79%	29,204	29.11%	12,180	1.10%	459	41,843
Catoosa	79.47%	18,881	19.32%	4,590	1.21%	287	23,758
Charlton	75.08%	2,534	24.36%	822	0.56%	19	3,375
Chatham	40.01%	41,425	58.97%	61,059	1.02%	1,059	103,543
Chattahoochee	54.57%	603	44.71%	494	0.72%	8	1,105
Chattooga	79.85%	5,936	19.44%	1,445	0.71%	53	7,434
Cherokee	72.08%	76,700	26.36%	28,047	1.56%	1,664	106,411
Clarke	28.56%	12,365	70.27%	30,427	1.18%	510	43,402
Clay	45.19%	536	54.13%	642	0.67%	8	1,186
Clayton	11.79%	10,868	87.81%	80,971	0.40%	373	92,212
Clinch	76.04%	1,717	23.65%	534	0.31%	7	2,258
Cobb	44.53%	138,852	54.12%	168,767	1.35%	4,195	311,814
Coffee	70.78%	8,929	28.78%	3,630	0.44%	56	12,615
Colquitt	75.83%	9,830	23.56%	3,054	0.61%	79	12,963
Columbia	66.44%	40,947	32.49%	20,023	1.08%	664	61,634
Cook	70.93%	4,116	28.73%	1,667	0.34%	20	5,803
Coweta	69.69%	40,471	29.12%	16,908	1.19%	692	58,071
Crawford	72.86%	3,595	26.39%	1,302	0.75%	37	4,934
Crisp	63.05%	4,445	36.55%	2,577	0.40%	28	7,050
Dade	82.53%	4,508	16.18%	884	1.28%	70	5,462
Dawson	85.94%	9,953	13.12%	1,519	0.94%	109	11,581
Decatur	60.05%	5,492	39.53%	3,615	0.43%	39	9,146
DeKalb	15.64%	48,923	83.47%	261,042	0.89%	2,776	312,741
Dodge	73.93%	5,220	25.73%	1,817	0.34%	24	7,061
Dooly	52.73%	2,001	46.96%	1,782	0.32%	12	3,795
Dougherty	29.69%	9,330	69.94%	21,980	0.37%	115	31,425
Douglas	39.35%	21,744	59.82%	33,053	0.83%	458	55,255
Early	55.26%	2,285	44.50%	1,840	0.24%	10	4,135
Echols	88.19%	1,008	11.02%	126	0.79%	9	1,143
Effingham	76.89%	17,969	22.01%	5,145	1.10%	257	23,371
Elbert	69.73%	5,152	29.70%	2,194	0.57%	42	7,388
Emanuel	69.98%	5,400	29.52%	2,278	0.49%	38	7,716
Evans	69.39%	2,392	30.17%	1,040	0.44%	15	3,447
Fannin	82.96%	9,306	16.13%	1,809	0.92%	103	11,218
Fayette	56.03%	32,497	42.75%	24,796	1.22%	705	57,998
Floyd	71.10%	21,569	27.84%	8,445	1.07%	324	30,338
Forsyth	70.57%	65,845	27.97%	26,092	1.46%	1,361	93,298
Franklin	86.54%	7,051	12.71%	1,036	0.75%	61	8,148
Fulton	26.66%	112,991	72.34%	306,589	0.99%	4,208	423,788
Gilmer	83.70%	10,471	15.32%	1,917	0.98%	122	12,510
Glascock	91.39%	1,189	8.22%	107	0.38%	5	1,301
Glynn	63.54%	20,743	35.64%	11,636	0.82%	269	32,648
Gordon	81.93%	14,586	17.11%	3,046	0.97%	172	17,804
Grady	67.30%	5,633	32.31%	2,704	0.39%	33	8,370
Greene	65.10%	5,856	34.39%	3,093	0.51%	46	8,995
Gwinnett	42.23%	132,998	56.55%	178,097	1.21%	3,823	314,918
Habersham	83.51%	12,944	15.59%	2,417	0.90%	139	15,500
Hall	73.35%	49,442	25.50%	17,187	1.15%	777	67,406
Hancock	24.58%	872	75.14%	2,666	0.28%	10	3,548
Haralson	87.65%	9,278	11.52%	1,219	0.83%	88	10,585
Harris	74.03%	11,834	25.15%	4,021	0.82%	131	15,986
Hart	76.60%	7,370	22.64%	2,178	0.77%	74	9,622
Heard	83.21%	3,374	16.13%	654	0.67%	27	4,055
Henry	41.97%	41,364	57.31%	56,485	0.72%	709	98,558
Houston	57.93%	34,314	41.12%	24,358	0.95%	560	59,232
Irwin	75.83%	2,701	23.89%	851	0.28%	10	3,562
Jackson	81.60%	21,950	17.38%	4,674	1.02%	275	26,899
Jasper	74.52%	4,430	24.96%	1,484	0.52%	31	5,945
Jeff Davis	82.64%	3,979	16.91%	814	0.46%	22	4,815
Jefferson	46.95%	3,177	52.67%	3,564	0.38%	26	6,767
Jenkins	64.66%	1,857	34.96%	1,004	0.38%	11	2,872
Johnson	72.47%	2,524	27.22%	948	0.32%	11	3,483
Jones	67.82%	8,438	31.65%	3,938	0.52%	65	12,441
Lamar	69.39%	5,105	29.84%	2,195	0.77%	57	7,357
Lanier	71.24%	1,910	28.42%	762	0.34%	9	2,681
Laurens	65.87%	12,484	33.64%	6,375	0.49%	93	18,952
Lee	74.66%	10,120	24.76%	3,356	0.58%	79	13,555
Liberty	36.16%	5,557	63.09%	9,696	0.75%	115	15,368
Lincoln	69.44%	2,756	29.93%	1,188	0.63%	25	3,969
Long	64.81%	2,591	34.29%	1,371	0.90%	36	3,998
Lowndes	57.30%	20,488	42.02%	15,024	0.67%	241	35,753
Lumpkin	79.23%	9,157	19.28%	2,228	1.50%	173	11,558
Macon	36.90%	1,556	62.89%	2,652	0.21%	9	4,217
Madison	78.48%	9,181	20.67%	2,418	0.85%	100	11,699
Marion	63.87%	1,872	35.38%	1,037	0.75%	22	2,931
McDuffie	60.54%	5,323	38.98%	3,427	0.48%	42	8,792
McIntosh	59.50%	3,218	39.96%	2,161	0.54%	29	5,408
Meriwether	58.88%	5,093	40.47%	3,501	0.65%	56	8,650
Miller	77.88%	1,803	21.68%	502	0.43%	10	2,315
Mitchell	56.16%	4,187	43.53%	3,245	0.31%	23	7,455
Monroe	71.94%	9,308	27.18%	3,516	0.88%	114	12,938
Montgomery	76.13%	2,686	23.27%	821	0.60%	21	3,528
Morgan	71.22%	6,807	27.99%	2,675	0.80%	76	9,558
Murray	85.76%	9,512	13.43%	1,489	0.81%	90	11,091
Muscogee	38.48%	24,348	60.79%	38,462	0.73%	462	63,272
Newton	45.08%	19,449	54.27%	23,412	0.65%	280	43,141
Oconee	69.80%	14,480	29.00%	6,015	1.20%	249	20,744
Oglethorpe	70.44%	4,568	28.48%	1,847	1.08%	70	6,485
Paulding	66.53%	40,784	32.56%	19,959	0.92%	562	61,305
Peach	52.01%	5,432	47.54%	4,966	0.45%	47	10,445
Pickens	84.80%	11,331	14.23%	1,901	0.97%	130	13,362
Pierce	88.95%	6,123	10.72%	738	0.33%	23	6,884
Pike	85.71%	7,322	13.63%	1,164	0.67%	57	8,543
Polk	79.13%	10,177	20.12%	2,588	0.75%	96	12,861
Pulaski	69.77%	2,527	29.79%	1,079	0.44%	16	3,622
Putnam	71.82%	6,704	27.63%	2,579	0.56%	52	9,335
Quitman	55.53%	522	43.62%	410	0.85%	8	940
Rabun	80.01%	6,063	18.84%	1,428	1.15%	87	7,578
Randolph	45.07%	1,257	54.43%	1,518	0.50%	14	2,789
Richmond	31.47%	22,076	67.75%	47,531	0.78%	548	70,155
Rockdale	31.93%	11,703	67.45%	24,725	0.62%	227	36,655
Schley	80.96%	1,565	18.26%	353	0.78%	15	1,933
Screven	60.36%	3,268	39.36%	2,131	0.28%	15	5,414
Seminole	66.59%	2,149	32.88%	1,061	0.53%	17	3,227
Spalding	61.17%	14,937	37.92%	9,258	0.91%	222	24,417
Stephens	80.62%	7,326	18.62%	1,692	0.76%	69	9,087
Stewart	41.78%	760	57.89%	1,053	0.33%	6	1,819
Sumter	48.78%	5,149	50.78%	5,360	0.45%	47	10,556
Talbot	39.51%	1,167	59.75%	1,765	0.74%	22	2,954
Taliaferro	38.00%	350	61.67%	568	0.33%	3	921
Tattnall	76.32%	5,073	23.12%	1,537	0.56%	37	6,647
Taylor	62.81%	2,069	36.58%	1,205	0.61%	20	3,294
Telfair	66.77%	2,425	32.79%	1,191	0.44%	16	3,632
Terrell	45.70%	1,800	53.95%	2,125	0.36%	14	3,939
Thomas	61.22%	10,557	38.29%	6,602	0.49%	85	17,244
Tift	69.65%	9,523	29.77%	4,070	0.59%	80	13,673
Toombs	74.75%	6,623	24.84%	2,201	0.41%	36	8,860
Towns	81.69%	5,009	17.37%	1,065	0.95%	58	6,132
Treutlen	68.86%	1,800	30.83%	806	0.31%	8	2,614
Troup	60.77%	14,533	38.55%	9,218	0.68%	162	23,913
Turner	62.98%	2,062	36.65%	1,200	0.37%	12	3,274
Twiggs	52.72%	1,999	46.84%	1,776	0.45%	17	3,792
Union	83.43%	9,899	15.61%	1,852	0.96%	114	11,865
Upson	66.83%	7,063	32.58%	3,443	0.59%	62	10,568
Walker	80.97%	17,400	17.86%	3,838	1.17%	252	21,490
Walton	76.88%	29,742	22.43%	8,679	0.69%	265	38,686
Ware	71.66%	7,894	27.84%	3,067	0.50%	55	11,016
Warren	46.57%	1,053	53.07%	1,200	0.35%	8	2,261
Washington	50.53%	4,128	49.11%	4,012	0.36%	29	8,169
Wayne	80.15%	8,120	19.15%	1,940	0.70%	71	10,131
Webster	59.91%	659	40.00%	440	0.09%	1	1,100
Wheeler	71.05%	1,372	28.74%	555	0.21%	4	1,931
White	84.51%	9,667	14.40%	1,647	1.09%	125	11,439
Whitfield	72.30%	19,758	26.80%	7,323	0.90%	246	27,327
Wilcox	73.32%	2,064	26.47%	745	0.21%	6	2,815
Wilkes	58.90%	2,578	40.53%	1,774	0.57%	25	4,377
Wilkinson	55.64%	2,373	44.01%	1,877	0.35%	15	4,265
Worth	75.39%	5,915	24.14%	1,894	0.47%	37	7,846

Counties that flipped from Democratic to Republican

- Burke (largest municipality: Waynesboro)
- Chattahoochee (largest municipality: Cusseta)
- Dooly (largest municipality: Vienna)
- Quitman (largest municipality: Georgetown)
- Twiggs (largest municipality: Jeffersonville)
- Washington (largest municipality: Sandersville)
- Wilkinson (largest municipality: Gordon)

Counties that flipped from Republican to Democratic

- Cobb (largest municipality: Marietta)
- Gwinnett (largest municipality: Peachtree Corners)

==== By congressional district ====
Kemp won eight of 14 congressional districts. Abrams won the other six, including one that elected a Republican.

District	Kemp	Abrams	Representative
1st	56%	43%	Buddy Carter
2nd	44%	56%	Sanford Bishop
3rd	64%	35%	Drew Ferguson
4th	20%	79%	Hank Johnson
5th	11%	88%	John Lewis
6th	48%	51%	Lucy McBath
7th	49%	50%	Rob Woodall
8th	64%	35%	Austin Scott
9th	79%	20%	Doug Collins
10th	61%	38%	Jody Hice
11th	59%	39%	Barry Loudermilk
12th	58%	42%	Rick W. Allen
13th	23%	76%	David Scott
14th	75%	24%	Tom Graves

== Analysis ==
=== Voter demographics ===
Edison Research exit poll
Demographic subgroup	Abrams	Kemp	No Answer	% of Voters
Gender
Men	46	52	2	46
Women	51	49	N/A	54
Age
18–24 years old	60	38	2	9
25–29 years old	72	26	2	5
30–39 years old	61	38	1	15
40–49 years old	49	50	1	19
50–64 years old	41	58	1	29
65 and older	40	60	N/A	22
Race
White	25	74	1	60
Black	93	6	1	30
Latino	62	37	1	5
Asian	N/A	N/A	N/A	2
Other	N/A	N/A	N/A	3
Race by gender
White men	25	73	2	28
White women	25	75	N/A	32
Black men	88	11	1	14
Black women	97	2	1	16
Latino men	N/A	N/A	N/A	2
Latina women	N/A	N/A	N/A	3
Others	54	44	2	5
Education
High school or less	38	61	1	30
Some college education	50	48	2	25
Associate degree	51	48	1	12
Bachelor's degree	54	45	1	21
Advanced degree	60	39	1	12
Education and race
White college graduates	40	59	1	22
White no college degree	17	82	1	39
Non-white college graduates	85	14	1	12
Non-white no college degree	84	15	1	28
Whites by education and gender
White women with college degrees	43	57	N/A	11
White women without college degrees	16	83	1	21
White men with college degrees	38	61	1	11
White men without college degrees	17	81	2	17
Non-whites	84	15	1	40
Income
Under $30,000	65	34	1	20
$30,000–49,999	38	60	2	20
$50,000–99,999	43	57	N/A	35
$100,000–199,999	41	58	1	18
Over $200,000	N/A	N/A	N/A	7
Party ID
Democrats	97	2	1	33
Republicans	3	97	N/A	38
Independents	54	44	2	28
Party by gender
Democratic men	96	3	1	12
Democratic women	98	2	n/a	21
Republican men	3	97	N/A	17
Republican women	3	97	N/A	21
Independent men	55	42	3	17
Independent women	53	45	2	12
Ideology
Liberals	88	11	1	20
Moderates	63	36	1	38
Conservatives	16	83	1	42
Marital status
Married	33	66	1	55
Unmarried	63	36	1	45
Gender by marital status
Married men	29	68	3	25
Married women	34	65	1	30
Unmarried men	58	41	1	21
Unmarried women	69	31	N/A	24
First-time midterm election voter
Yes	53	46	1	18
No	48	50	2	82
Most important issue facing the country
Health care	79	20	1	34
Immigration	9	90	1	32
Economy	43	57	N/A	23
Gun policy	N/A	N/A	N/A	9
Area type
Urban	70	29	1	22
Suburban	43	56	1	63
Rural	42	58	N/A	15
Source: CNN

== Electoral controversies ==
Kemp retained his office as Georgia secretary of state throughout the campaign, leading to allegations of a conflict of interest for overseeing an election in which he himself was a candidate. During the campaign, he was called upon by former president and former governor of Georgia Jimmy Carter and the Georgia chapters of the NAACP and Common Cause to resign from the secretariat position. Kemp refused to do so until after he claimed victory, two days following the election. Kemp also accused the state Democratic Party of hacking into the state's voter database a few days before the election; however, an email released shortly after the accusation was made showed the party warning election security experts, highlighting "massive" vulnerabilities within the state's My Voter Page and its online voter registration system, not an attempt to hack the database, as Kemp had claimed.

Irregularities in voter registration occurred prior to the election. Between 2012 and 2018, Kemp's office canceled over 1.4 million voter registrations, with nearly 700,000 cancellations in 2017 alone. Over 300,000 people were removed from the rolls on the grounds that they had moved to a new address, when they actually had not. On a single night in July 2017, half a million voters had their registrations canceled. According to The Atlanta Journal-Constitution, election-law experts said that this "may represent the largest mass disenfranchisement in US history." The registrations of 53,000 voters, disproportionately affecting black people, were delayed by Kemp's office for not exactly matching state driver records. After a lawsuit was filed, Kemp agreed to allow flagged voters to vote if they had identification. These irregularities resulted in allegations that Kemp was using voter suppression to increase his chances of winning the contest. Georgia election officials responded to these allegations by stating that any voter flagged for irregularities could still vote, receiving a regular ballot (not a provisional ballot), by providing ID at a valid polling place, as is required of all voters by state law. Concerning the question of why the pending registration status mattered if those voters could vote normally at the polls, critics claimed that learning of this status might discourage those voters from turning out to the polls at all.

The Washington Post reported that "more than 200 polling places" across Georgia were closed in the 2018 election, "primarily in poor and minority neighborhoods. Voters reported long lines, malfunctioning voting machines and other problems that delayed or thwarted voting in those areas." (The Atlanta Journal-Constitution found that "precinct closures and longer distances likely prevented an estimated 54,000 to 85,000 voters from casting ballots" on the 2018 Election Day.) According to Richard L. Hasen, professor of law and political science at the University of California at Irvine, "there is no question that Georgia in general and Brian Kemp in particular took steps to make it harder for people to register and vote, and that those people tended to skew Democratic."

On November 12, 2018, U.S. District Court Judge Amy Totenberg ruled that Georgia's secretary of state office must take steps to preserve provisional ballots and begin counting them. On November 13, 2018, U.S. District Court Judge Leigh Martin May ruled that Gwinnett County violated the Civil Rights Act in rejecting absentee ballots with missing or incorrect specified year of birth of the absentee voter.

On November 16, 2018, Abrams announced that she was ending her campaign. Abrams acknowledged that Kemp would be certified as victor, while emphasizing that her statement was not a concession, saying "I acknowledge that Secretary of State Brian Kemp will be certified as the victor of the 2018 gubernatorial election. [...] But let’s be clear, this is not a speech of concession because concession means to acknowledge an action is right, true or proper." Abrams announced the creation of Fair Fight Action, a voting rights nonprofit organization that sued the secretary of state and state election board in federal court for voter suppression. In February 2021, a federal judge ruled that Fair Fight's claims about voting machines, voter list security, and polling place issues were resolved by changes in Georgia's election law, or invalidated due to lack of standing to sue. In April 2021, a judge allowed some claims in the legal challenge to proceed while rejecting others. On September 30, 2022, a federal judge ruled against Fair Fight on the remaining claims, finding that Georgia's voting practices did not violate the Constitution or the Voting Rights Act. According to the judge, the case "resulted in wins and losses for all parties over the course of the litigation and culminated in what is believed to have been the longest voting rights bench trial in the history of the Northern District of Georgia."

Since losing the election, Abrams has repeatedly claimed that the election was not fairly conducted and has declined to call Kemp the legitimate governor of Georgia. Her position is that Kemp, who oversaw the election in his role as secretary of state, had a conflict of interest and suppressed turnout by purging nearly 670,000 voter registrations in 2017, and that about 53,000 voter registrations were pending a month before the election. She has said, "I have no empirical evidence that I would have achieved a higher number of votes. However, I have sufficient and I think legally sufficient doubt about the process to say that it was not a fair election."

On November 9, 2018, the Atlanta Journal-Constitution reported that its investigation of the 2018 statewide elections in Georgia had found "no evidence ... of systematic malfeasance – or of enough tainted votes to force a runoff election". A follow-up analysis in December 2019 by the Atlanta Journal-Constitution found "an estimated 54,000 to 85,000 voters" were impacted by changes, such as precinct closures in the aftermath of Shelby County v. Holder. However, it found that Abrams would have needed up to 67% of the votes at "ideal voting locations" for a runoff to occur.

In his 2020 book, University of California law professor and election law expert Richard L. Hasen described Kemp as "perhaps the most incompetent state chief elections officer" in the 2018 elections and said it was "hard to tell" which of Kemp's "actions were due to incompetence and which were attempted suppression." According to Washington Post fact checker Glenn Kessler writing in September 2022, Abrams repeatedly falsely claimed that she "won" the election, that the election was "rigged", that it was "stolen", that it was not "free and fair", and that Kemp had "cheated". Kessler said that "Abrams played up claims the election was stolen until such tactics became untenable for anyone who claims to be an advocate for American democratic norms and values".
