= Don Balfour (politician) =

American politician

Member of the Georgia State Senate from the 9th district
- In office 1993–2015
- Succeeded by: P.K. Martin IV

President of the National Conference of State Legislatures
- In office 2009–2010
- Preceded by: Joe Hackney
- Succeeded by: Richard T. Moore

Personal details
- Party: Republican
- Spouse: Ginny
- Education: B.S. Bob Jones University; M.A. Fairleigh Dickinson University

Donald Kenneth Balfour II is a Republican politician. He was a member of the Georgia State Senate, representing the 9th District.

== Legislative career ==
Balfour, a resident of Snellville and an executive with Waffle House, Inc., was elected to the State Senate in 1992. He was re-elected multiple times without opposition. In 2002, after Republicans took control of the Georgia Senate for the first time, he was elected chairman of the Republican caucus and in 2003 he became chairman of the senate's Rules Committee, a position he held until January 2013. He served as President of the National Conference of State Legislatures from 2009 to 2010. He announced a campaign for the United States House of Representatives in Georgia's 7th congressional district in March 2010 (see United States House of Representatives elections in Georgia § District 7), but ended his campaign later that month. Balfour was defeated in a primary challenge in 2014. When he left office, he was the longest-serving Republican in the Georgia Senate.

== Indictment and acquittal ==
Balfour was indicted by a Fulton County grand jury for eighteen counts of falsifying expense reports and theft by taking. In November 2013, pending his trial, he was suspended from his office by Governor Nathan Deal, and from his party positions by the Senate Republican Caucus. In December, Balfour was acquitted of all charges and his suspension was reversed.
