= Sherry Boston =

DeKalb County District Attorney

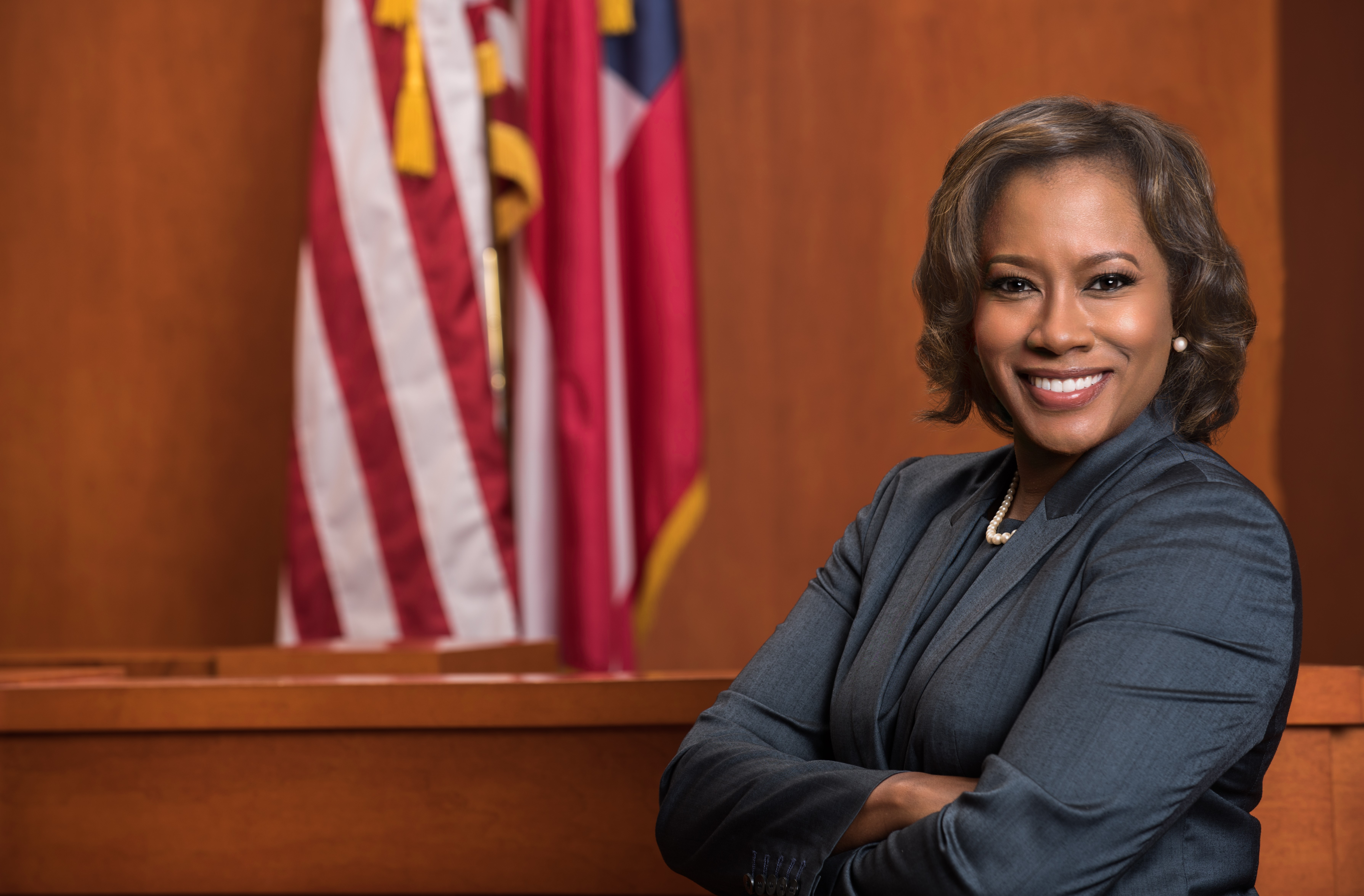
DA Sherry Boston Headshot

Sherry Boston serves as the district attorney for DeKalb County, Georgia, which includes a portion of Atlanta, as well as several smaller metro-area cities. Boston was first elected to the position in 2016 after defeating incumbent DA Robert James, a fellow Democrat, in the primary. Boston ran on an anti-corruption platform. She is the second woman to serve as DA in DeKalb County.

As district attorney, Boston oversees a staff of approximately 300 attorneys, investigators, victim-witness advocates and other employees whose job is to prosecute felony cases in the Stone Mountain Judicial Circuit. Before becoming DA, Boston served as DeKalb County's Solicitor-General, a position Gov. Sonny Perdue, a Republican, appointed her to fill in January 2011. Boston started her career as a defense attorney. She was the first woman ever appointed to serve as municipal court judge for the City of Dunwoody.

== SB 92 legal challenge ==
On August 2, 2023, Boston lead a bipartisan group of four district attorneys who filed a lawsuit against the State of Georgia aimed at striking down Senate Bill 92 (SB92). The new law created a commission of political appointees empowered to investigate, discipline and even remove elected prosecutors from office, named the Prosecuting Attorneys Qualifications Commission (PAQC). The plaintiffs argued the law violates both the Georgia Constitution and the U.S. Constitution by limiting their First Amendment rights to free speech, as well as violating the separation of powers between the judicial, legislative and executive branches of state government.

On December 8, 2023 the plaintiffs filed a motion to dismiss the lawsuit after the Georgia Supreme Court issued an order declining to review the rules for the PAQC. In the order, the Supreme Court raised questions about the constitutionality of the statute and whether district attorneys fall under the judicial or executive branches of governments. The court's decision prevented the commission from moving forward because SB92 required Supreme Court approval before the commission could operate.

== Initiatives ==
Throughout her career as a prosecutor, Boston has worked to raise awareness of domestic violence and teen dating violence. Every February, Boston hosts the Love Run 5K, a fundraiser for the Women's Resource Center to End Domestic Violence in DeKalb County. WRC honored her with a Champion for Change award in 2018.

Boston has also worked to address gun violence by establishing a Firearm Violence Prevention unit.

Under Boston's leadership, in 2019 DeKalb County became the first district attorney's office in the state to require that all staff members undergo implicit bias training.

== Personal life ==
Boston was born in Maryland and grew up in Baltimore County. Her mother was a teacher, and her father was a machinist. Boston graduated from Villanova University in Philadelphia, Pa. and completed her law degree at Emory University's School of Law in Atlanta. Boston lives in DeKalb County with her husband and two daughters.
