= GeorgiaCarry.org =

- GeorgiaCarry.org: Protecting Your Rights
- Formation: February 2, 2007
- Members: 8,000+
- President: Kelly Kennett
- Vice President: John R. Monroe
- Website: www.georgiacarry.org

GeorgiaCarry.org (GCO) is a state-level gun rights organization that is dedicated to preserving and protecting the rights of its members to keep and bear arms as protected under their interpretation of the Second Amendment to the United States Constitution and Paragraph VIII of the Constitution of the State of Georgia. On its website, the organization describes itself as "Georgia's no-compromise voice for gun owners." The organization is also referred to as Georgia Carry in conversation and press coverage. It is a non-profit corporation organized under the laws of the State of Georgia. It has been described as Georgia's "powerful firearms lobbyist" that "makes the National Rifle Association look like a popgun group".

It is engaged in activism such as promoting new legislation to affirm the rights of gun owners, such as Georgia House Bill 89 which was passed during the 2008 legislative session, and litigating Second Amendment cases on the behalf of its members. In 2008 it was involved in litigation against the city of Atlanta regarding the carrying of firearms in non-secure areas of the Hartsfield-Jackson International Airport by citizens licensed to carry open and concealed firearms by the state.

As of August 18, 2014, GeorgiaCarry.org has about 8,500+ dues-paying members. It has brought at least 13 federal and state lawsuits as of July 2008.

== Lobbying Efforts ==
=== House Bill 89 (2007–2008) ===
GCO was instrumental in crafting the 2007–08 session HB 89, which was passed into law on May 14, 2008. The legislation changed laws governing the carrying of firearms for both individuals with a Georgia Firearms Licence and those that did not.

The law permitted unlicensed individuals to carry firearms anywhere in their private vehicle (previously the law said that handguns could only be carried in the golvebox or center console).

The law also permitted individuals with a Georgia Firearms License (or a recognized out-of-state carry license) to carry firearms in restaurants, state parks, on public transportation and publicly accessible parking lots. Constables became permitted to carry firearms at school functions and on school property.

The bill also created a new felony offense for "Any person who attempts to solicit, persuade, encourage, or entice any dealer to transfer or otherwise convey a firearm other than to the actual buyer, as well as any other person who willfully and intentionally aids or abets such person". This section is said to have been designed to prohibit gun dealer entrapment schemes, such as those orchestrated by Mayor of New York City Michael Bloomberg.

== Court Briefs and Actions ==
=== United States Federal Court ===
==== MARTA Case ====
GCO has sued the Metropolitan Atlanta Rapid Transit Authority on behalf of Christopher Raissi, one of its members. It is claimed that Mr. Raissi's 4th amendment and 14th amendment rights were violated by his 30-minute detention, at the Avondale station on October 14, 2008, by MARTA Police Department officers for legally and openly carrying a firearm in a holster on his belt. The lawsuit was filed in the United States District Court for the Northern District of Georgia, Atlanta Division.

==== Zachary Nelson Mead v. Richmond County, GA, Sheriff ====
In December, 2008, GCO settled its 42 U.S.C. § 1983 (Federal Civil Rights) lawsuit against Richmond County, Georgia, Sheriff Strength. The order declared that the August 1, 2008, seizure, by Deputy Kadum Townsend, of Staff Sergeant Zachary Nelson Mead's openly carried pistol was a violation of the 4th amendment. The court awarded court costs and attorney fees to Staff Sergeant Mead and dismissed the remaining charges with prejudice

==== District of Columbia v. Heller ====
GeorgiaCarry.org, through its attorneys John R. Monroe and Edward A. Stone, submitted an amicus curiae brief to the United States Supreme Court regarding District of Columbia v. Heller. The GCO brief's argument is summarized as:

The Petitioners recite a selective portion of the history of gun control laws in the District of Columbia, but omit portions of that history which demonstrate that the Petitioners' laws are deeply rooted in a racist attempt to keep arms out of the hands of the politically and economically disadvantaged. This brief will explore the racist history of gun control in the District of Columbia and throughout the country. It also will show how the principles of black oppression via gun control laws of yesterday are used to oppress the politically weak today via those same, and additional, laws.

Dick Heller, the plaintiff in District of Columbia v. Heller, in an interview with radio talk show host Mark Walters, said that the GCO brief really opened his mind that the nascence of Jim Crow laws as gun control in the South. He said that when talking with the press or testifying before the city council, he will be sure to bring up that Jim Crow is alive in Washington, D.C.

=== Georgia Court ===
GCO has proceeded against various county and city governments that have enacted or are enforcing gun regulations contrary to the State of Georgia's preemption law. The law specifies that "No county or municipal corporation, by zoning or by ordinance, resolution, or other enactment, shall regulate in any manner gun shows; the possession, ownership, transport, carrying, transfer, sale, purchase, licensing, or registration of firearms or components of firearms; firearms dealers; or dealers in firearms components".

==== City of Atlanta Park Gun Ban ====
Based on precedence set in the Coweta County case, GeorgiaCarry.org sued the City of Atlanta over Atlanta Ordinance ~ 110-66, which prohibited the carry of firearms in Atlanta parks. On May 9, 2008, Doris L. Downs, Chief Judge of the Fulton Superior Court, ordered that "The City of Atlanta is hereby ENJOINED from enforcing Atlanta Ordinance ~ 110-66 to the extent it prohibits the possession of firearms in city parks."

==== Coweta County Park Gun Ban ====
One of GCO's first court actions was a lawsuit against Coweta County's ban on firearms in parks. The organization lost the original case, but won on appeal. The Court of Appeals of Georgia reversed the lower court, ruling that "the county was prohibited from regulating carrying firearms 'in any manner' and that it was error for the lower court to have ruled otherwise".

== Corporate Structure ==
Two related corporations share the same Fayetteville, Georgia, principle mailing address and key people according to records kept by the Corporations Division of the office of the Secretary of State of Georgia.

GEORGIACARRY.ORG, INC., is a non-profit corporation that was incorporated in the State of Georgia on February 2, 2007. GuideStar categorizes this corporation as a Civil Rights, Social Action, and Advocacy organization.

GCO FOUNDATION, INC., is a non-profit corporation that was incorporated in the State of Georgia on February 11, 2008. GuideStar categorizes this corporation as a Crime, Legal Related / (Crime Prevention N.E.C.) organization.

== See also ==
- Gun politics in the United States
