= Rick Jeffares =

American politician

Member of the Georgia State Senate from the 17th district
- In office January 10, 2011 – December 1, 2017
- Preceded by: John Douglas
- Succeeded by: Brian Strickland

Personal details
- Born: April 18, 1964 McDonough, Georgia, U.S.
- Party: Republican
- Spouse: Leslie Jordan
- Children: 4
- Education: Clayton College and State University (BA)
- Profession: Politician

Rick Jeffares is an American politician who served in the Georgia State Senate as a member of the Republican Party from 2010 to 2017. He represented Senate District 17, which encompasses Henry, Newton, and Rockdale Counties. In 2018, Jeffares ran as a candidate for Lieutenant Governor of Georgia.

== Early life, education and work career ==
Jeffares was born and raised in Henry County, Georgia. His father farmed cotton, soybeans and wheat and raised cattle on tracts of land around the county.

When Jeffares was 13, his father died. Jeffares took over the farm while helping his mother raise two younger brothers. Jeffares attended Clayton College and State University where he earned his Bachelor of Arts degree in management.

Jeffares began his career at the Henry County Water Authority and led the City of Covington, Georgia Water and Sewer Department. He then started J&T Environmental Services, an operation and maintenance services company that builds and service water, sewer and wastewater facilities. He also serves as a project manager for G. Ben Turnipseed Engineers.

Jeffares resides in Locust Grove, Georgia.

== Political career ==
In 2001, Jeffares became the City Manager for Locust Grove, Georgia. In 2008, he left that position, eventually becoming a Commissioner for Henry County, Georgia.

In 2010, Jeffares was elected to the Georgia State Senate from the 17th District. He has represented portions of Henry, Newton, Rockdale, Spalding and Walton Counties during his tenure in the Georgia General Assembly. He serves as Chairman of the Regulated Industries and Vice Chairman of the Natural Resources Committees. He is also a member of the Appropriations and Ethics Committees.

He also serves as the vice-president of the Georgia Rural Water Association and is a member of the Georgia Violence Commission.

== Campaign for lieutenant governor ==
Jeffares filed his paperwork on May 25, 2017, for the race for lieutenant governor of Georgia. Jeffares received an endorsement from Congressman Drew Ferguson. While Rick joined the race significantly later than his opponents, but had strong fundraising total to disclose on his first financial disclosure report. On December 1, 2017, Rick Jeffares resigned from the Georgia State Senate to completely focus on his campaign.
