= Georgia's 23rd Senate district =

Georgia state senate district

Georgia's 23rd State Senate district
Senator
Max Burns; R–Sylvania
- Demographics: 54.27% White; 34.66% Black; 5.46% Hispanic; 1.16% Asian; 0.24% Native American; 0.10% Hawaiian/Pacific Islander; 0.34% Other; 4.99% Multiracial
- Population (2020) • Voting age: 190,344; 144,113

District 23 of the Georgia Senate is located in East Georgia and the Central Savannah River Area.

The district includes southern Augusta-Richmond, Burke, western Columbia, Emanuel, Glascock, Jefferson, Jenkins, McDuffie, Screven, Taliaferro, and Warren counties.

The current senator is former U.S. Rep. Max Burns, a Republican from Sylvania first elected in 2020.

== Senators ==
Senator	Tenure
J.B. Powell	until 2010
Jesse Stone	2010–20
Max Burns	2020–present
