= Michael Williams (Georgia politician) =

American politician

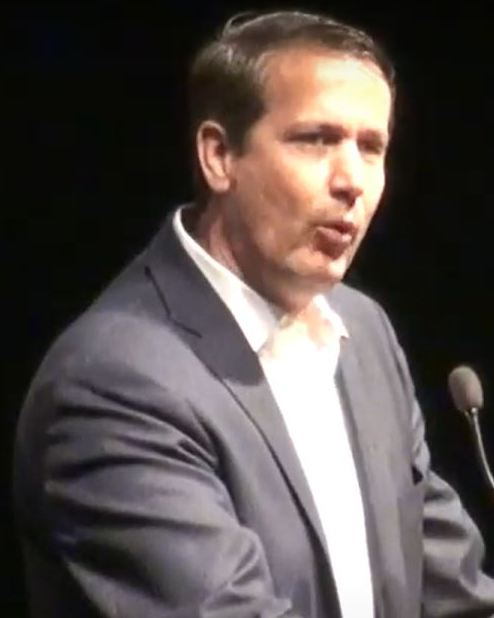
- Williams in 2018

Member of the Georgia State Senate from the 27th district
- In office September 14, 2014 – January 14, 2019
- Preceded by: Jack Murphy
- Succeeded by: Greg Dolezal

Personal details
- Party: Republican
- Spouse: Virginia
- Education: University of Montevallo (BA)

Michael Williams is an American politician and businessman. He served as a Republican member of the Georgia State Senate from Senate District 27, covering the majority of Forsyth County. He was also a candidate for Governor of Georgia, but was defeated in the 2018 primary.

First elected to the Georgia State Senate in 2014, Williams defeated longtime Republican incumbent State Senator Jack Murphy in a runoff election. Williams won the race with 66% of the vote to Murphy's 34%. Williams largely self-funded his campaign, contributing over $300,000 of his own money toward the race.

Williams did not seek re-election in 2018 for his Senate seat, in a bid to run for Governor of Georgia. Williams came in last place in the May 22, 2018 primary, with just 4.8% of the vote.

== State senate ==
Williams was the secretary of the Banking and Financial Institutions Committee. He was chair of the Appropriations Sub-Committee on Fiscal Management and General Government. He also served as a member of the Appropriations, Ethics, Finance and Public Safety Committees.

Williams was one of the first Georgia elected officials to endorse Donald Trump for president. His political consultant, Seth Weathers, also had close ties to the Trump campaign. Weathers briefly served as the Trump campaign's state director in Georgia. Williams is a Latter-day Saint and used this fact to campaign for Trump in Utah.

== Business career ==
Williams received his Bachelor's degree in Accounting from the University of Montevallo in 1999. He is a certified public accountant and worked with Arthur Anderson upon graduation. He has since owned and operated a chain of 18 successful franchise businesses. He sold his business interests the year prior to announcing his state senate campaign in 2013.

== Campaign for governor ==
Williams ran for Georgia Governor in 2018. In his announcement speech, he was quoted, "People want someone willing to take a stand for what they believe, someone who will relentlessly pursue fearless conservative reform. If you want more politics as usual, vote for my opponents. If you want fearless conservative reform, vote for Michael Williams." He came in last place in the May 22 gubernatorial primary, with just 4.8% of the vote.

In the end, even as he drew national attention for a "deportation bus tour", he was generally ignored by his GOP rivals. At some debates, frontrunner Casey Cagle wouldn't even respond to Williams's attacks. His struggles started with his failure to raise significant cash to build name recognition and lack of any significant accomplishment in the Georgia Legislature.

Williams staged a protest at River Ridge School in protest of a teacher who had banned her students from wearing pro-Trump t-shirts. The Williams campaign said, "Once again, the school is attempting to ignore the rights of Trump supporters to express their 1st Amendment rights. Just five days after Cherokee County Chief Marshal Ron Hunton told the Cherokee Tribune that our protest was lawful, the school is claiming it unlawful with threat of forceful police removal." Williams was said, "If politicians wanted to have a real conversation on reducing gun violence, they would be discussing mental health awareness and ways to reduce the weekly bloodbath in Chicago and other inner cities."

Williams, a gun rights advocate, again gained national attention when his campaign held a bump stock giveaway a few weeks after the 2017 Las Vegas shooting. Williams was quoted saying, "The tragedy in Las Vegas broke my heart, but any talk of banning or regulating bump stocks is merely cheap political lip service from career politicians. In reality, the bump stock is the new, shiny object politicians are using to deceive voters into believing they are taking action against gun violence," Williams said in a statement on his website. "You cannot regulate evil out of existence. Blaming guns or bump stocks for the actions of a lunatic, is the same as blaming McDonald's for heart disease."

He attracted controversy for posing for a photograph with a group that was later identified as an armed militia group affiliated with the 3 Percenters, before an event sponsored by ACT! for America, which the Southern Poverty Law Center has described as a hate group. The rally was part of a dozen nationwide protests against Shariah religious law organized by ACT! for America, which calls the tenets of Sharia incompatible with Western democracy.

During February 2018, Williams generated further controversy for statements made on CNN about Delta Air Lines. In the aftermath of the Stoneman Douglas High School shooting in February 2018, Delta Air Lines severed ties with the National Rifle Association and no longer offered discounts to members of the organization. Williams subsequently accused the airline of showing political bias to left-wing organizations, directly accusing Delta of providing benefits to members of Planned Parenthood citing that he and others had "looked it up on Google". Multiple news organizations fact-checked this claim and noted that the accusation was patently false. However, Williams never corrected or apologized for this erroneous statement.

In May 2018, Williams was criticized for his controversial campaign bus, a repurposed school bus Williams describes as a "deportation bus". The bus bears messages such as "Follow me to Mexico" and "DANGER! Murderers, rapists, kidnappers, child molestors[sic], and other criminals on board". On May 16, it was reported that a campaign stop in Athens had to be cancelled after protesters prevented the bus from leaving a stop in Decatur.

== Arrest ==
In December 2018 Williams was indicted for insurance fraud, making false statements, and filing a false police report. The charges are related to a May 2018 incident in which Williams alleged that $300,000 worth of cryptocurrency mining equipment was stolen from his campaign headquarters. Williams turned himself into the Hall County jail on December 26, 2018. In a statement given by his attorney Williams denied the charges.

On May 29, 2019, despite earlier assertions by his consultant Seth Weathers, calling the investigation a "political witch hunt", Williams pled guilty to making a false report that computer servers were stolen from his campaign office shortly before his last-place primary finish. He was sentenced to four years of probation, 120 hours of community service and a $5,000 fine under the First Offender Act. The court records were sealed as a condition of the plea agreement.

== Electoral history ==
Georgia State Senate 27th District Election, 2014
| Party | Candidate | Votes | % |
| Republican | Michael Williams | 10,796 | 66 |
| Republican | Jack Murphy | 5,518 | 34 |
