= Lindsey Tippins =

American politician

Member of the Georgia Senate from the 37th district
- In office 2010–2023
- Preceded by: John J. Wiles
- Succeeded by: Ed Setzler

Personal details
- Born: June 26, 1949 (age 77) United States
- Party: Republican

Lindsey Tippins (born June 26, 1949) is an American politician. He is a member of the Georgia State Senate from the 37th District, serving since 2010. He is a member of the Republican party.

Tippins previously served for 12 years on the Cobb Board of Education during which he served as chairman for three years. He is the past president of the Georgia Utility Contractor Association and the North Georgia State Fair and has served as a long time board member of both organizations. He is the owner and founder of Tippins Contracting Company, Inc., a pipeline construction company, which has been in business since 1969.

He is the uncle of 2018 Georgia GOP Primary 4th-place finisher Clay Tippins. Most believe it was Tippins' political feud with Casey Cagle over private school scholarship legislation that sparked a secret tape that helped sink the Lieutenant Governor's campaign for Governor. Ironically, Tippins supported Governor-Elect Brian Kemp was supportive of the same scholarship program.
