= Michael Rhett =

American politician

Doc Rhett

Member of the Georgia State Senate from the 33rd district
- Incumbent
- Assumed office January 2015
- Preceded by: Steve Thompson

Personal details
- Born: December 30, 1956 (age 69) New York City, New York, U.S.
- Party: Democratic
- Education: Community College of the Air Force; State University of New York, Albany (BA); University of Central Oklahoma (MA); Georgia State University (EdS); University of Georgia (EdD)

Michael Anthony "Doc" Rhett (born December 30, 1956) is an American politician. He is a member of the Georgia State Senate from the 33rd District, serving since 2015. He is a member of the Democratic Party.
