= Renee Unterman =

American politician

Member of the Georgia Senate from the 45th district
- In office January 2003 – January 2021
- Preceded by: Bob Guhl
- Succeeded by: Clint Dixon

Member of the Georgia House of Representatives from the 84th district
- In office January 1999 – January 2003
- Preceded by: Jere Johnson
- Succeeded by: Ron Dodson

Personal details
- Born: January 27, 1954 (age 72) Gwinnett County, Georgia, U.S.
- Party: Republican
- Education: Georgia State University; University of Georgia (BA)

Renee Stovall Unterman (born January 27, 1954) is an American politician. A Republican, she represented the 45th District in the Georgia State Senate from 2003 to 2021. Unterman chaired the Georgia State Senate Science and Technology Committee. She previously served in the Georgia State House of Representatives from 1999 to 2003.

== Personal life ==
Unterman was raised in Gwinnett County, Georgia, and graduated from the University of Georgia. She earned a nursing degree from Georgia State University. While she grew up Catholic, she converted to Judaism prior to marrying her third husband.

== Political career ==
Unterman served in the Georgia State House of Representatives from 1998 to 2002. She served as a member of the Georgia State Senate from the 45th District from 2003 to 2021. She is a member of the Republican Party.

On June 6, 2019, Unterman announced her candidacy for U.S. House of Representatives in Georgia's 7th congressional district.

=== State Senate tenure ===
Unterman has served as chair of the Georgia State Senate Health and Human Services Committee. Unterman is also an executive for Amerigroup, a health insurer with a state Medicaid contract.

In March 2016, Unterman (in her capacity as Health and Human Services Committee chair) blocked House Bill 827, the Pursuing Justice for Rape Victims Bill, which would have required law enforcement to account for any backlog of untested rape kits.

On September 5, 2018, an attack ad was released claiming that Georgia Secretary of State and 2018 Republican gubernatorial candidate Brian Kemp chose not to pursue accusations of sexual assault against therapists employed by Massage Envy because of donations made by franchisee owners to Kemp's campaign. Unterman stated publicly that there appeared to be "a direct connection between campaign support from Massage Envy franchisees in exchange for non-action and suppression" and asked U.S. Attorney B.J. Pak to investigate "what seems to be a quid pro quo scheme being perpetrated through the secretary of state’s office and the Kemp for governor campaign." Kemp said that he did nothing illegal, and refunded the contributions that had been questioned. In response to the accusations, a spokesperson for Kemp's campaign stated that Unterman was "mentally unstable" and suggested she "seek immediate medical attention before she hurts herself or someone else". These remarks appeared to reference Unterman's history of depression, about which she has spoken publicly. In response, Unterman said she would not be "intimidated, blackmailed, belittled, or sexually harassed" into silence by Kemp's campaign.

At the beginning of the 2019 legislative session, Unterman was removed as chair of the Health and Human Services Committee by the incoming Senate leader, Lieutenant Governor Geoff Duncan. Subsequently, she spoke out about a new Senate rule change that shortened the period an accuser has to file a civil complaint against Senators or their staff for claims of sexual harassment and also claimed to have recently been sexually harassed. At the time, she sided with the Democratic women in the Senate who also protested the new rule change. Unterman was made chair of the less influential Science & Technology Committee.

House Bill 481 ("HB481") was considered by the Committee in 2019. Known as the "Heartbeat" bill, the legislation sought to prohibit women from obtaining abortions from as early as six weeks or when the heartbeat of the fetus could be detected. When HB481 passed the House and was forwarded to the Senate, it was sent to Unterman's committee. Unterman held a public hearing on the bill and, with the chamber's lawyers, drafted a substitute bill that was passed by the Senate. Unterman did not vote on the bill in committee vote, but did so once it arrived on the Senate floor.

Speaking in favor of an anti-hate crimes bill in 2020, Unterman spoke about her personal experience facing antisemitism following her conversion to Judaism, including having voters explicitly tell her they could not support her because of her religion. She also accused her Republican colleague, Rich McCormick, of pressuring her to wear a Christmas sweater as a "belittling me because of my religion and my faith" (McCormick replied that Unterman was "crying wolf like [she] regularly has done when things don’t go her way.").
