= Elena Parent =

American politician (born 1975)

Member of the Georgia State Senate
- Incumbent
- Assumed office January 12, 2015
- Preceded by: Jason Carter
- Constituency: 42nd district (2015–2025); 44th district (2025–present)

Member of the Georgia House of Representatives from the 81st district
- In office January 10, 2011 – January 14, 2013
- Preceded by: Jill Chambers
- Succeeded by: Scott Holcomb

Personal details
- Born: Elena Catherine Parent; December 27, 1975 (age 50) Washington, D.C., U.S.
- Party: Democratic
- Spouse: Briley Brisendine
- Children: 2
- Education: University of Virginia (BA, JD)
- Occupation: Attorney

Elena Catherine Parent (born December 27, 1975) is an American politician and attorney. A member of the Democratic Party, she serves in the Georgia State Senate and previously served in the Georgia House of Representatives.

== Personal life ==
Parent was born in Washington, D.C. She received both her bachelor's degree and Juris Doctor from the University of Virginia. She has two children with her husband, Briley. She was an associate attorney with Sutherland Asbill & Brennan LLP from 2002 to 2008.

== Political career ==
In 2010, Parent was elected to serve in the Georgia House of Representatives, representing District 81 from 2011 to 2013. She did not run for reelection in 2013 after her seat was combined with the district of Scott Holcomb after the state's redistricting process.

When Jason Carter decided to run for governor in 2014, Parent ran for the open seat in District 42, which includes portions of central and north DeKalb County. She defeated attorney Kyle Williams in the Democratic primary. She won reelection on November 3, 2020, for a fourth term in the Georgia Senate beginning in 2021. Following redistricting in 2024, she won election as representative of District 44. She did not seek reelection in 2026.

In 2025, she crossed party lines to vote in favor of a bill banning gender affirming care for state prisoners.
