= Greg Kirk =

American politician (1963–2019)

Member of the Georgia Senate from the 13th district
- In office January 2014 – December 22, 2019
- Preceded by: John Crosby
- Succeeded by: Carden Summers

Personal details
- Born: September 24, 1963 Americus, Georgia, U.S.
- Died: December 22, 2019 (aged 56) Americus, Georgia, U.S.
- Party: Republican

Gregory Mark Kirk (September 24, 1963 – December 22, 2019) was an American politician from Americus, Georgia. He was a member of the Georgia State Senate from the 13th District, representing the Georgian counties of Crisp, Dodge, Dooly, Lee, Tift, Turner, Worth and parts of Sumter and Wilcox from 2014 until his death in 2019. He was a member of the Republican Party.

== Personal life ==
Kirk graduated with a master's degree in Psychology from Troy State University. He and his wife, Rosalyn, had seven children and five grandchildren. They lived in Americus, Georgia.

== Georgia State Senate committee memberships ==
As of the 2017 Georgia Legislative Session, Sen. Kirk served on the following committees:

- Agriculture and Consumer Affairs
- Health and Human Services
- Insurance and Labor and
- Judiciary

== Election history ==
=== 2014 Republican Primary Election ===
2014 Republican primary election, Georgia Senate district 13
Party	Candidate	Votes	%
Republican	Greg Kirk	6,826	50.9
Republican	Bryce A. Johnson	6,597	49.1

Kirk did not face opposition in the 2014 General Election.

=== 2016 General Election ===
2016 general election, Georgia Senate district 13
Party	Candidate	Votes	%
Republican	Greg Kirk (incumbent)	43,534	72.09
Democratic	Ruenett Melton	16,853	27.91

=== 2018 ===
Kirk ran unopposed in both the primary and general elections in 2018.

== Health and death ==
Kirk announced in June 2019 that he had been diagnosed with bile duct cancer earlier that year, but said in an update in November that many of his tumors were "gone or shrunk". He entered outpatient hospice care for pain management the next month and said in a statement on December 18 that he planned to run for re-election in 2020. Four days later, on December 22, Kirk died at the age of 56.
