= Jeff Mullis =

American politician

Member of the Georgia Senate from the 53rd district
- In office January 8, 2001 – January 9, 2023
- Preceded by: Waymond C. Huggins
- Succeeded by: Colton Moore

Personal details
- Born: Jeffrey Eugene Mullis; December 27, 1959 (age 66)
- Party: Republican
- Spouse: Teresa Nichols
- Children: 3
- Profession: Economic developer, former fire chief, community planner
- Website: www.legis.ga.gov/members/senate/31?session=1029

Jeffrey Eugene Mullis (December 27, 1959) is an American politician and a former member of the Georgia State Senate. A member of the Republican Party, he represented the 53rd district from 2001 to 2023 after an unsuccessful run for state senator in 1998.

Mullis is from Chickamauga. He currently serves as executive director of the Northwest Georgia Joint Development Authority and chairman of the Top of Georgia Economic Development. He was appointed to the Stone Mountain Memorial Association Board by Governor Kemp in 2023. He is married to Teresa Nichols and has three children.

In 2021, Mullis sponsored election reform legislation in Georgia. The bill would end no-excuse absentee voting and restrict absentee voting to those who are over 75, have a physical disability, or are out of town. He sponsored the legislation during the COVID-19 pandemic and shortly after the 2020 elections, when Democratic candidates won one of Georgia's U.S. Senate seats as well as Georgia's electoral college votes in the presidential election.

== Political career ==
Mullis has served in the 146th, 147th, 148th and 149th Georgia General Assemblies.

=== Georgia State Senate positions ===
- Committees
  - Rules - Chairman
  - Chairman of the Economic Development Subcommittee of Senate Appropriation
  - Appropriations - Member
  - Banking and Financial Institutions - Member
- Caucuses
  - Republican Caucus – Vice-chairman
  - Sportsman's Caucus – Co-chairman

== Awards ==
- 2020 Legislative Champion of the Year. Named by the Georgia Academy of Family Physicians (GAFP).

== See also ==
- List of state government committees (Georgia)
