= Chuck Hufstetler =

American politician

Member of the Georgia State Senate from the 52nd district
- Incumbent
- Assumed office January 14, 2013
- Preceded by: Barry Loudermilk

Personal details
- Born: Charles Edward Hufstetler; July 7, 1956 (age 70) Shannon, Georgia
- Party: Republican

Charles "Chuck" Edward Hufstetler (born July 7, 1956) is an American politician who has served in the Georgia State Senate from the 52nd district since 2013.
