= P. K. Martin IV =

American politician

Member of the Georgia State Senate from the 9th district
- In office January 12, 2015 – January 11, 2021
- Preceded by: Don Balfour
- Succeeded by: Nikki Merritt

Personal details
- Born: Peter Kuhl Martin IV; March 30, 1977 (age 49) Lawrenceville, Georgia, U.S.
- Party: Republican
- Spouse: Amanda Syfert
- Education: Georgia Tech (BA)

Peter Kuhl Martin IV (born March 30, 1977) is an American politician. He was a member of the Georgia State Senate from the 9th district, from 2015 to 2021. He is a member of the Republican Party.
