= Jesse Stone (Georgia politician) =

American politician

Member of the Georgia Senate from the 23rd district
- In office January 11, 2011 – January 11, 2021
- Preceded by: J.B. Powell
- Succeeded by: Max Burns

Personal details
- Born: March 21, 1956 (age 70) Augusta, Georgia, US
- Party: Republican
- Education: University of Georgia
- Profession: lawyer

Jesse Collins Stone (born March 21, 1956) is an American politician from the state of Georgia. A member of the Republican Party, Stone represented the 23rd district in the Georgia State Senate from 2011 to 2021. He is a former mayor of Waynesboro, Georgia.
