= John Wilkinson (Georgia politician) =

American politician

John K. Wilkinson

Member of the Georgia Senate from the 50th district
- In office December 15, 2011 – January 11, 2021
- Preceded by: Jim Butterworth
- Succeeded by: Bo Hatchett

Personal details
- Born: 1955 (age 70–71) Toccoa, Georgia, U.S.
- Party: Republican
- Spouse: Debbie
- Children: 2
- Education: University of Georgia
- Profession: teacher, farmer

John Knox Wilkinson (born 1955) is an American politician who served as a Republican member of the Georgia State Senate from 2011 to 2021. He was elected in a special election in 2011, and sworn in on December 15, 2011. Wilkinson is a teacher/farmer and attended the University of Georgia. He was born in Toccoa, Georgia.
