= 150th Georgia General Assembly =

Term of state legislature in US state of Georgia

←	149th	151st	→
- Great Seal of the State of Georgia

Overview
- Legislative body: Georgia General Assembly
- Meeting place: Georgia State Capitol

Senate
- Members: 56 (34 R, 22 D*)
- President of the Senate: Casey Cagle (R)
- Party control: Republican Party

House of Representatives
- Members: 180 (108 R, 71 D, 1 I)
- Speaker of the House: David Ralston (R)
- Party control: Republican Party

== Overview ==
The 150th Georgia General Assembly. convened its first session on January 12, 2009, at the Georgia State Capitol. in Atlanta, Georgia. The 150th Georgia General Assembly succeeded the 149th and served as the precedent for the 151st General Assembly in 2011.

The 150th General Assembly adjourned its first session on April 3, 2009. The second session of the 150th General Assembly convened January 11, 2010.

== Officers ==
=== Senate ===
==== Presiding officer ====
Position	Name	District	Party
President	Casey Cagle	n/a	Republican
President Pro Tempore	Tommie Williams	19	Republican

==== Majority leadership ====
Position	Name	District
Senate Majority Leader	Chip Rogers	21
Majority Caucus Chairman	Dan Moody	56
Majority Vice leader	John Wiles	37

==== Minority leadership ====
Position	Name	District
Senate Minority Leader	Robert Brown	26
Minority Caucus Chairman	Tim Golden	8
Minority Vice leader	David Adelman	42

=== House of Representatives ===
==== Presiding officer ====
Position	Name	District	Party
Speaker of the House	David Ralston	7	Republican
Speaker Pro Tempore	Jan Jones	46	Republican

Glenn Richardson (R) served as Speaker of the House from January 2009 through Jan. 1, 2010. Mark Burkhalter (R) served as Speaker pro tempore during the same period, and was acting Speaker when the House reconvened on Jan. 11, 2010, at which time the House elected David Ralston and Jan Jones.

==== Majority leadership ====
Position	Name	District
House of Representatives Majority Leader	Jerry Keen	179
House of Representatives Majority Vice leader	Edward Lindsey	54
Majority Caucus Chairman	Donna Sheldon	105
Majority Caucus Vice Chairman	Jeff May	111
Majority Caucus Sec./Treas.	Allen Peake	137

==== Minority leadership ====
Position	Name	District
House of Representatives Minority Leader	DuBose Porter	143
House of Representatives Minority Vice leader	Carolyn Hugley	133
House of Representatives Minority Caucus Chairman	Calvin Smyre	132
House of Representatives Minority Caucus Vice Chairman	Nikki Randall	138
Minority Caucus Secretary	Kathy Ashe	56
Minority Caucus Treasurer	Don Wix	33

== Members of the state senate ==
District	District	Senator	Party	First elected	Residence
1	1	Earl “Buddy” Carter	Republican	2009	Pooler
2	2	Lester Jackson	Democratic	2008	Savannah
3	3	Jeff Chapman	Republican	2004	Brunswick
4	4	Jack Hill	Republican	1990	Reidsville
5	5	Curt Thompson	Democratic	2004	Norcross
6	6	Doug Stoner	Democratic	2004	Smyrna
7	7	Greg Goggans	Republican	2004	Douglas
8	8	Tim Golden	Democratic	1998	Valdosta
9	9	Don Balfour	Republican	1992	Snellville
10	10	Emanuel Jones	Democratic	2004	Ellenwood
11	11	John Bulloch	Republican	2002	Ockhocknee
12	12	Freddie Powell Sims	Democratic	2008	Dawson
13	13	John Crosby	Republican	2008	Tifton
14	14	George Hooks	Democratic	1990	Americus
15	15	Ed Harbison	Democratic	1992	Columbus
16	16	Ronnie Chance	Republican	2004	Tyrone
17	17	John Douglas	Republican	2004	Social Circle
18	18	Cecil Staton	Republican	2004	Macon
19	19	Tommie Williams	Republican	1998	Lyons
20	20	Ross Tolleson	Republican	2002	Perry
21	21	Chip Rogers	Republican	2004	Woodstock
22	22	VACANT			
23	23	J.B. Powell	Democratic	2004	Blythe
24	24	Bill Jackson	Republican	2007	Appling
25	25	Johnny Grant	Republican	2004	Milledgeville
26	26	Robert Brown	Democratic	1991	Macon
27	27	Jack Murphy	Republican	2006	Cumming
28	28	Mitch Seabaugh	Republican	2000	Sharpsburg
29	29	Seth Harp	Republican	2000	Midland
30	30	Bill Hamrick	Republican	1999	Carrollton
31	31	Bill Heath	Republican	2004	Bremen
32	32	Judson Hill	Republican	2004	East Cobb
33	33	Steve Thompson	Democratic	1990	Marietta
34	34	Valencia Seay	Democratic	2003	Riverdale
35	35	Donzella James	Democratic	2009	College Park
36	36	Nan Orrock	Democratic	2006	Atlanta
37	37	John Wiles	Republican	2004	Kennesaw
38	38	Horacena Tate	Democratic	1998	Atlanta
39	39	Vincent Fort	Democratic	1996	Atlanta
40	40	Dan Weber	Republican	2004	Dunwoody
41	41	Steve Henson	Democratic	2002	Tucker
42	42	David Adelman	Democratic	2002	Atlanta
43	43	Ronald Ramsey, Jr.	Democratic	2006	Lithonia
44	44	Gail Buckner	Democratic	2008	Jonesboro
45	45	Renee Unterman	Republican	2002	Buford
46	46	Bill Cowsert	Republican	2006	Athens
47	47	Ralph Hudgens	Republican	2002	Hull
48	48	David Shafer	Republican	2001	Duluth
49	49	Lee Hawkins	Republican	2006	Gainesville
50	50	Jim Butterworth	Republican	2008	Cornelia
51	51	Chip Pearson	Republican	2004	Dawsonville
52	52	Preston Smith	Republican	2002	Rome
53	53	Jeff Mullis	Republican	2000	Chickamauga
54	54	Don Thomas	Republican	1996	Dalton
55	55	Gloria Butler	Democratic	1999	Stone Mountain
56	56	Dan Moody	Republican	2002	Alpharetta

=== Changes in membership from previous term ===
While no seat changed party control from the previous session, the beginning of the 150th Georgia General Assembly still saw five new state senators. Two of these new senators defeated the incumbent in the runoff for their parties' primaries. Two replaced incumbents who had run for other office. Another replaced a senator who had retired.

District	Previous	Subsequent	Reason for change
2nd	Regina Thomas (D)	Lester Jackson (D)	Ran for Congress
12th	Michael Meyer von Bremen (D)	Freddie Powell Sims (D)	Ran for a seat on the Georgia Court of Appeals
13th	Joseph Carter (R)	John Crosby (R)	Retired
44th	Gail Davenport (D)	Gail Buckner (D)	Defeated in primary runoff
50th	Nancy Schaefer (R)	Jim Butterworth (R)	Defeated in primary runoff

=== Changes in membership during current term ===
There have been three vacancies in the State Senate as of December 25, 2009. All three have been due to resignations. Two have since been filled, both by members of the same party as the former incumbent. Another vacancy is expected at some point during the term.

Date seat became vacant	District	Previous	Reason for change	Subsequent	Date of successor's taking office
August 2009	35th	Kasim Reed (D)	Resigned to run for Mayor of Atlanta. A special election was held on November 3, 2009. Because no candidate gained a majority of the vote, a runoff was held December 1, 2009.	Donzella James (D)	
September 15, 2009	1st	Eric Johnson (R)	Resigned to run for Governor of Georgia. A special election was held on November 3, 2009.	Buddy Carter (R)	
November 9, 2009	22nd	Ed Tarver (D)	Resigned after being confirmed as U.S. Attorney for the Southern District of Georgia. A special election is to be held January 5, 2010 with a runoff, if necessary on February 2, 2010.	Hardie Davis (D)	
March 19, 2010	42nd	David Adelman (D)	Nominated by President Barack Obama as United States Ambassador to Singapore. If confirmed, Adelman will have to resign his State Senate seat, creating another vacancy.	Jason Carter (D)	

=== Announced retirements ===
As of December 25, 2009, six state senators have announced that they will not be running for re-election in 2010. One senator, Dan Moody (56th) is retiring. The other five are seeking higher office.

Jeff Chapman (3rd) is running for governor. Following State Insurance and Fire Commissioner John Oxendine's decision to run for governor, Seth Harp (29th) and Ralph Hudgens (47th) announced that they will seek the Republican nomination for the office. Lee Hawkins (49th) announced that he will run for the Congressional seat to be left open by incumbent Nathan Deal's campaign for governor. Finally, Gail Buckner is running for state secretary of state, a position she also ran for in 2006.

== Members of the House of Representatives ==
District	Representative	Party	First elected	Residence
1	Jay Neal	Republican	2004	LaFayette
2	Martin Scott	Republican	2004	Rossville
3	Tom Weldon	Republican	2008	Ringgold
4	Roger Williams	Republican	2001	Ringgold
5	John D. Meadows, III	Republican	2004	Calhoun
6	Tom Dickson	Republican	2004	Cohutta
7	David Ralston	Republican	2002	Blue Ridge
8	Stephen Allison	Republican	2008	Blairsville
9	Amos Amerson	Republican	2000	Dahlonega
10	Ben Bridges	Republican	2008	Clarkesville
11	Barbara Massey Reece	Democratic	1998	Menlo
12	Rick Jasperse	Republican	2010	Jasper
13	Katie Dempsey	Republican	2006	Rome
14	Barry Loudermilk	Republican	2010	Cassville
15	Paul Battles	Republican	2008	Cartersville
16	Rick Crawford	Democratic	2007	Cedartown
17	Howard R. Maxwell	Republican	2002	Dallas
18	Mark Butler	Republican	2010	Carrollton
19	Glenn Richardson	Republican	2010	Hiram
20	Charlice H. Byrd	Republican	2004	Woodstock
21	Calvin Hill	Republican	2002	Canton
22	Sean Jerguson	Republican	2006	Holly Springs
23	Mark Hamilton	Republican	2006	Cumming
24	Tom Knox	Republican	2010	Suwanee
25	James Mills	Republican	1992	Gainesville
26	Carl Rogers	Republican	1994	Gainesville
27	Doug Collins	Republican	2006	Gainesville
28	Michael Harden	Republican	2008	Toccoa
29	Alan Powell	Democratic	1990	Hartwell
30	Tom McCall	Republican	1994	Elberton
31	Tommy Benton	Republican	2004	Jefferson
32	Judy Manning	Republican	1996	Marietta
33	Don Wix	Democratic	2010	Austell
34	Rich Golick	Republican	1998	Smyrna
35	Ed Setzler	Republican	2004	Acworth
36	Earl Ehrhart	Republican	1988	Powder Springs
37	Terry Johnson	Democratic	2004	Marietta
38	Pat Dooley	Democratic	2010	Marietta
39	Alisha Thomas Morgan	Democratic	2002	Austell
40	Stacey Adams	Democratic	2010	Atlanta
41	Sharon Cooper	Republican	1996	Marietta
42	Don Parsons	Republican	1994	Marietta
43	Bobby Franklin	Republican	1996	Marietta
44	Sheila Jones	Democratic	2004	Atlanta
45	Matt Dollar	Republican	2002	Marietta
46	Jan Jones	Republican	2003	Milton
47	Chuck Martin	Republican	2002	Alpharetta
48	Harry Geisinger	Republican	2004	Roswell
49	Wendell Willard	Republican	2000	Sandy Springs
50	Mark Burkhalter	Republican	2010	Johns Creek
51	Tom Rice	Republican	1996	Norcross
52	Joe Wilkinson	Republican	2000	Atlanta
53	Elly Dobbs	Democratic	2008	Atlanta
54	Edward Lindsey	Republican	2004	Atlanta
55	Rashad Taylor	Democratic	2008	Atlanta
56	Kathy Ashe	Democratic	1990	Atlanta
57	Pat Gardner	Democratic	2001	Atlanta
58	Simone Bell	Democratic	2009	Atlanta
59	Margaret D. Kaiser	Democratic	2006	Atlanta
60	Georganna Sinkfield	Democratic	2010	Atlanta
61	Ralph Long	Democratic	2008	Atlanta
62	Joe Heckstall	Democratic	1994	East Point
63	Tyrone L. Brooks, Sr.	Democratic	1980	Atlanta
64	Roger B. Bruce	Democratic	2002	Atlanta
65	Sharon Beasley-Teague	Democratic	1992	Red Oak
66	Virgil Fludd	Democratic	2002	Tyrone
67	Bill Hembree	Republican	1998	Winston
68	Tim Bearden	Republican	2004	Villa Rica
69	Randy Nix	Republican	2006	LaGrange
70	Lynn Ratigan Smith	Republican	1996	Newnan
71	Billy Horne	Republican	2004	Newnan
72	Matt Ramsey	Republican	2006	Peachtree City
73	John P. Yates	Republican	1988	Griffin
74	Roberta Abdul-Salaam	Democratic	2004	Riverdale
75	Ron Dodson	Democratic	2010	Jonesboro
76	Mike Glanton	Democratic	2010	Jonesboro
77	Darryl Jordan	Democratic	2000	Riverdale
78	Wade Starr	Democratic	2008	Jonesboro
79	Fran Millar	Republican	2010	Dunwoody
80	Mike Jacobs	Republican	2004	Brookhaven
81	Jill Chambers	Republican	2000	Atlanta
82	Kevin Levitas	Democratic	2004	Atlanta
83	Mary Margaret Oliver	Democratic	2002	Decatur
84	Stacey Abrams	Democratic	2006	Atlanta
85	Stephanie Stuckey Benfield	Democratic	1998	Atlanta
86	Karla Drenner	Democratic	2000	Avondale Estates
87	Michele D. Henson	Democratic	1990	Stone Mountain
88	Billy Mitchell	Democratic	2002	Stone Mountain
89	Earnest "Coach" Williams	Democratic	2002	Avondale Estates
90	Howard Mosby	Democratic	2002	Atlanta
91	Rahn Mayo	Democratic	2008	Atlanta
92	Pam Stephenson	Democratic	2002	Decatur
93	Dee Dawkins-Haigler	Democratic	2008	Lithonia
94	Randal Mangham	Democratic	2010	Lithonia
95	Toney Collins	Democratic	2010	Conyers
96	Pedro Rafael Marin	Democratic	2002	Duluth
97	Brooks P. Coleman, Jr.	Republican	1992	Duluth
98	Bobby C. Reese	Republican	2010	Buford
99	Hugh Floyd	Democratic	2002	Norcross
100	Brian W. Thomas	Democratic	2004	Lilburn
101	Mike Coan	Republican	2010	Lawrenceville
102	Clay Cox	Republican	2004	Lilburn
103	David Casas	Republican	2002	Lilburn
104	John Heard	Republican	2004	Lawrenceville
105	Donna Sheldon	Republican	2002	Dacula
106	Melvin Everson	Republican	2006	Snellville
107	Len Walker	Republican	2004	Loganville
108	Terry Lamar England	Republican	2004	Auburn
109	Steve Davis	Republican	2004	McDonough
110	John Lunsford	Republican	2004	McDonough
111	Jeff May	Republican	2004	Monroe
112	Doug Holt	Republican	2004	Social Circle
113	Bob Smith	Republican	2004	Watkinsville
114	Keith Heard	Democratic	1992	Athens
115	Doug McKillip	Democratic	2006	Athens
116	Mickey Channell	Republican	2002	Greensboro
117	Lee Anderson	Republican	2008	Grovetown
118	Ben L. Harbin	Republican	1994	Evans
119	Barbara Sims	Republican	2006	Augusta
120	Quincy Murphy	Democratic	2002	Augusta
121	Henry "Wayne" Howard	Democratic	2006	Augusta
122	Earnest Smith	Democratic	2009	Augusta
123	Gloria Frazier	Democratic	2006	Hephzibah
124	Sistie Hudson	Democratic	1996	Sparta
125	Jim Cole	Republican	2004	Monticello
126	David Knight	Republican	2004	Griffin
127	Billy Maddox	Republican	2007	Zebulon
128	Carl Von Epps	Democratic	1992	LaGrange
129	Kip Smith	Republican	2009	Columbus
130	Debbie Buckner	Democratic	2002	Junction City
131	Richard H. Smith	Republican	2004	Columbus
132	Calvin Smyre	Democratic	1974	Columbus
133	Carolyn Hugley	Democratic	1992	Columbus
134	Mike Cheokas	Democratic	2004	Americus
135	Lynmore James	Democratic	1992	Montezuma
136	Robert Dickey	Republican	2011	Musella
137	Allen Peake	Republican	2006	Macon
138	Nikki Randall	Democratic	1999	Macon
139	David E. Lucas, Sr.	Democratic	1975	Macon
140	Bubber Epps	Democratic	2008	Dry Branch
141	Rusty Kidd	Independent	2009	Milledgeville
142	Mack Jackson	Democratic	2008	Sandersville
143	DuBose Porter	Democratic	1983	Dublin
144	Jimmy Pruett	Republican	2006	Eastman
145	Willie Lee Talton	Republican	2004	Warner Robins
146	Larry O'Neal	Republican	2001	Bonaire
147	Buddy Harden	Republican	2008	Cordele
148	Bob Hanner	Republican	1975	Parrott
149	Gerald E. Greene	Republican	1982	Cuthbert
150	Winfred J. Dukes	Democratic	1996	Albany
151	Carol Fullerton	Democratic	2008	Albany
152	Ed Rynders	Republican	2002	Albany
153	Austin Scott	Republican	2004	Tifton
154	Jay Roberts	Republican	2002	Ocilla
155	Greg Morris	Republican	1998	Vidalia
156	Larry "Butch" Parrish	Republican	1984	Swainsboro
157	Jon G. Burns	Republican	2004	Newington
158	Bob Lane	Republican	1983	Brooklet
159	Ann Purcell	Republican	2009	Rincon
160	Bob Bryant	Democratic	2004	Garden City
161	Mickey Stephens	Democratic	2008	Savannah
162	J. Craig Gordon	Democratic	2006	Savannah
163	Burke Day	Republican	2000	Savannah
164	Ron Stephens	Republican	1996	Savannah
165	Al Williams	Democratic	2002	Midway
166	Terry Barnard	Republican	2004	Glennville
167	Roger Bert Lane	Republican	2004	Darien
168	Tommy Smith	Republican	1978	Nicholls
169	Chuck Sims	Republican	1996	Ambrose
170	Penny Houston	Republican	1998	Nashville
171	Jay Powell	Republican	2008	Camilla
172	Gene Maddox	Republican	2004	Cairo
173	Mike Keown	Republican	2004	Thomasville
174	Ellis Black	Democratic	2002	Valdosta
175	Amy Carter	Democratic	2006	Valdosta
176	Jay Shaw	Democratic	2004	Lakeland
177	Mark Hatfield	Republican	2004	Waycross
178	Mark Williams	Republican	2004	Jesup
179	Jerry Keen	Republican	2004	Brunswick
180	Cecily Hill	Republican	2004	Woodbine

== Major issues ==
- Severe budget cuts due to the Great Recession.
- Circumvention of the Georgia Public Service Commission, by allowing Georgia Power to charge power company customers (which includes most Georgians) for two new nuclear reactors at Plant Vogtle years before they are built. The bill exempts businesses, putting the entire burden on residential customers. This passed in both chambers and was signed by the governor, but has been challenged in court as having raised revenue without being originated in the lower house.
- Proposed cuts in aid to counties, which reduce property taxes they must charge their residents. These were not cut, meaning that the state, rather than the counties, will have to cut over 400 million dollars from the fiscal 2010 (July 2009 to June 2010) budget.
- The massive food recall caused by the Peanut Corporation of America in Blakely, Georgia, and the role that the Georgia Department of Agriculture and lax state laws may have played in allowing it to happen. Food-processing companies will now be required to notify the state within 24 hours of any test results indicating contamination, among other changes.
- A bill to move MARTA oversight from MARTOC to GRTA, which did not pass.
- A bill to permanently remove the mandatory 50/50 split on capital expenditures, so that MARTA can postpone these and maintain service (operational expenditures) during periods of low sales tax revenue. The failure of the legislature to pass this means crippling cuts in MARTA service because it cannot access its reserve account, and the MARTA board has requested a special session to correct the situation. The Atlanta Regional Commission has suggested giving MARTA enough money from the U.S. stimulus act to get it to the 2010 legislative session with minimal cutbacks to the already-limited public transit system.
- Reinstatement of the sales tax on groceries, allegedly to target illegal immigrants. This failed.
- Elimination of sales taxes and annual ad valorem taxes on new cars, to be replaced by a car title transfer tax of 7%, including transfers between family members, and possibly to or from charities. This would also take a significant amount of money (the 2-4% local portion of the sales tax) away from local government. The 2000-dollar cap on the tax also would make it a regressive tax. This did not pass.
- Banning of all stem-cell research, passed by the Senate.
- Gutting most of the Georgia Department of Transportation, merging all of its planning authority into a new State Transportation Authority along with the Georgia Regional Transportation Authority and the State Road and Tollway Authority. This failed, an instead other changes were made to put more power in the hands of state politicians.
- Changing state law in order to accept money for the state unemployment insurance fund from the federal American Recovery and Reinvestment Act (the U.S. "stimulus act"). This became law, but no help will get to the unemployed until May 25.
- Requiring pickup truck and other truck drivers to wear their seat belts like other motorists have been for years. This failed again as in years past.
- Addition of a 200-dollar fine for excessive speeding, over 85 miles per hour (137 km/h) on expressways and over 75 miles per hour (121 km/h) on smaller roads. The money will go to trauma care in the state's hospitals.

== See also ==
- List of Georgia state legislatures
