= 149th Georgia General Assembly =

Term of state legislature in US state of Georgia

←	148th	150th	→
- Great Seal of the State of Georgia

Overview
- Legislative body: Georgia General Assembly
- Meeting place: Georgia State Capitol

Senate
- Members: 56 (34 R, 22 D)
- President of the Senate: Casey Cagle (R)
- Party control: Republican Party

House of Representatives
- Members: 180 (106 R, 74 D)
- Speaker of the House: Glenn Richardson (R)
- Party control: Republican Party

The 149th General Assembly of the U.S. state of Georgia first met in 2007, succeeding the 148th General Assembly, and was the precedent of the 150th General Assembly in 2009.

== Party standings ==
=== Senate ===
Affiliation	Members	
Republican Party	34	61%
Democratic Party	22	39%
Seat vacant^{**}	0	
Governing Majority	12	22%
Total	56	

=== House of Representatives ===
Affiliation	Members	
Republican Party	106	59%
Democratic Party	74	41%
Seat vacant^{**}	0	2%
Governing Majority	32	18%
Total	180	

== Officers ==
=== Senate ===
==== Presiding Officer ====
Position	Name	District	Party
President	Casey Cagle	n/a	Republican
President Pro Tempore	Eric Johnson	1	Republican

==== Majority leadership ====
Position	Name	District
Senate Majority Leader	Tommie Williams	19
Majority Caucus Chairman	Don Moody	56
Majority Whip	Mitch Seabaugh	28

==== Minority leadership ====
Position	Name	District
Senate Minority Leader	Robert Brown	26
Minority Caucus Chairman	Tim Golden	8
Minority Whip	David I. Adelman	42

=== House of Representatives ===
==== Presiding Officer ====
Position	Name	District	Party
Speaker of the House	Glenn Richardson	19	Republican
Speaker Pro Tempore	Mark Burkhalter	50	Republican

==== Majority leadership ====
Position	Name	District
House Majority Leader	Jerry Keen	179
Majority Whip	Barry A. Fleming	117
Majority Caucus Chairman	Jay Roberts	154
Majority Caucus Vice Chairman	Donna Sheldon	105
Majority Caucus Sec./Treas.	Jeff May	111

==== Minority leadership ====
Position	Name	District
House Minority Leader	DuBose Porter	143
Minority Whip	Carolyn Hugley	133
Minority Caucus Chairman	Calvin Smyre	132
Minority Caucus Vice Chairman	Nikki Randall	138
Minority Caucus Secretary	Kathy Ashe	56

== Members of the Georgia State Senate, 2007-2008 ==
District	Senator	Party	Residence
1	Eric Johnson	Republican	Savannah
2	Regina D. Thomas	Democratic	Savannah
3	Jeff Chapman	Republican	Brunswick
4	Jack Hill	Republican	Reidsville
5	Curt Thompson	Democratic	Norcross
6	Doug Stoner	Democratic	Smyrna
7	Greg Goggans	Republican	Douglas
8	Tim Golden	Democratic	Valdosta
9	Don Balfour	Republican	Snellville
10	Emanuel Jones	Democratic	Decatur
11	John Bulloch	Republican	Ochlocknee
12	Michael Meyer von Bremen	Democratic	Albany
13	Joseph Carter	Republican	Tifton
14	George Hooks	Democratic	Americus
15	Ed Harbison	Democratic	Columbus
16	Ronnie Chance	Republican	Tyrone
17	John Douglas	Republican	Social Circle
18	Cecil Staton	Republican	Macon
19	Tommie Williams	Republican	Lyons
20	Ross Tolleson	Republican	Perry
21	Chip Rogers	Republican	Woodstock
22	Ed Tarver	Democratic	Augusta
23	J.B Powell	Democratic	Blythe
24	Bill Jackson	Republican	Evans
25	Johnny Grant	Republican	Milledgeville
26	Robert Brown	Democratic	Macon
27	Jack Murphy	Republican	Cumming
28	Mitch Seabaugh	Republican	Sharpsburg
29	Seth Harp	Republican	Midland
30	William Hamrick	Republican	Carrollton
31	Bill Heath	Republican	Bremen
32	Judson Hill	Republican	Marietta
33	Steve Thompson	Democratic	Marietta
34	Valencia Seay	Democratic	Riverdale
35	Kasim Reed	Democratic	Atlanta
36	Nan Orrock	Democratic	Atlanta
37	John J. Wiles	Republican	Kennesaw
38	Horacena Tate	Democratic	Atlanta
39	Vincent Fort	Democratic	Atlanta
40	Dan Weber	Republican	Dunwoody
41	Steve Henson	Democratic	Tucker
42	David Adelman	Democratic	Decatur
43	Ronald Ramsey Sr.	Democratic	Lithonia
44	Gail Davenport	Democratic	Jonesboro
45	Renee S. Unterman	Republican	Buford
46	Bill Cowsert	Republican	Athens
47	Ralph T. Hudgens	Republican	Comer
48	David Shafer	Republican	Duluth
49	Lee Hawkins	Republican	Gainesville
50	Nancy Schaefer	Republican	Turnerville
51	Chip Pearson	Republican	Dawsonville
52	Preston W. Smith	Republican	Rome
53	Jeff Mullis	Republican	Chickamauga
54	Don Thomas	Republican	Dalton
55	Gloria S. Butler	Democratic	Stone Mountain
56	Dan Moody	Republican	Alpharetta

== Members of the Georgia State House of Representatives, 2007-2008 ==
District	Representative	Party	First elected	Residence
1	Jay Neal	Republican	2005	LaFayette
2	Martin Scott	Republican	2005	Rossville
3	Ronald L. Forster	Republican	2001	Ringgold
4	Roger Williams	Republican	2001	Dalton
5	John D. Meadows, III	Republican	2005	Calhoun
6	Tom Dickson	Republican	2005	Cohutta
7	David Ralston	Republican	2003	Blue Ridge
8	Charles F. Jenkins	Democratic	2003	Blairsville
9	Amos Amerson	Republican	2001	Dahlonega
10	Benjamin D. Bridges, Sr.	Republican	1997	Cleveland
11	Barbara Massey Reece	Democratic	1999	Menlo
12	Tom Graves	Republican	2003	Ranger
13	Katie Dempsey	Republican	2007	Rome
14	Barry Dean Loudermilk	Republican	2005	Cassville
15	Jeff Lewis	Republican	1993	White
16	Rick Crawford	Democratic	2007	Cedartown
17	Howard R. Maxwell	Republican	2003	Dallas
18	Mark Butler	Republican	2003	Carrollton
19	Glenn Richardson	Republican	1997	Hiram
20	Charlice H. Byrd	Republican	2005	Woodstock
21	Calvin Hill	Republican	2003	Canton
22	Sean Jerguson	Republican	2007	Woodstock
23	Mark Hamilton	Republican	2007	Cumming
24	Tom Knox	Republican	2001	Suwanee
25	James Mills	Republican	1993	Gainesville
26	Carl Rogers	Republican	1995	Gainesville
27	Doug Collins	Republican	2007	Gainesville
28	Jeanette Jamieson	Democratic	1985	Toccoa
29	Alan Powell	Democratic	1991	Hartwell
30	Tom McCall	Republican	1995	Elberton
31	Tommy Benton	Republican	2005	Jefferson
32	Judy Manning	Republican	1997	Marietta
33	Don Wix	Democratic	1999	Austell
34	Rich Golick	Republican	1999	Smyrna
35	Ed Setzler	Republican	2005	Acworth
36	Earl Ehrhart	Republican	1989	Powder Springs
37	Terry Johnson	Democratic	2005	Marietta
38	Steve Tumlin	Republican	2005	Marietta
39	Alisha Thomas Morgan	Democratic	2003	Austell
40	Rob Teilhet	Democratic	2003	Smyrna
41	Sharon Cooper	Republican	1997	Marietta
42	Don Parsons	Republican	1995	Marietta
43	Bobby Franklin	Republican	1997	Marietta
44	Sheila Jones	Democratic	2005	Atlanta
45	Matt Dollar	Republican	2003	Marietta
46	Jan Jones	Republican	2003	Milton
47	Chuck Martin	Republican	2003	Alpharetta
48	Harry Geisinger	Republican	2005	Roswell
49	Wendell Willard	Republican	2001	Sandy Springs
50	Mark Burkhalter	Republican	1993	Johns Creek
51	Tom Rice	Republican	1997	Norcross
52	Joe Wilkinson	Republican	2001	Atlanta
53	LaNett Stanley-Turner	Democratic	1987	Atlanta
54	Edward Lindsey	Republican	2005	Atlanta
55	"Able" Mable Thomas	Democratic	2003	Atlanta
56	Kathy Ashe	Democratic	1991	Atlanta
57	Pat Gardner	Democratic	2001	Atlanta
58	Robbin Shipp	Democratic	2007	Atlanta
59	Margaret Kaiser	Democratic	2007	Atlanta
60	Georganna T. Sinkfield	Democratic	1983	Atlanta
61	Bob Holmes	Democratic	1975	East Point
62	Joe Heckstall	Democratic	1995	East Point
63	Tyrone L. Brooks, Sr.	Democratic	1981	Atlanta
64	Roger B. Bruce	Democratic	2003	Atlanta
65	Sharon Beasley-Teague	Democratic	1993	Red Oak
66	Virgil Fludd	Democratic	2003	Tyrone
67	Bill Hembree	Republican	1999	Winston
68	Tim Bearden	Republican	2005	Villa Rica
69	Randy Nix	Republican	1995	LaGrange
70	Lynn Ratigan Smith	Republican	1997	Newnan
71	Billy Horne	Republican	2005	Sharpsburg
72	Matt Ramsey	Republican	2007	Peachtree City
73	John P. Yates	Republican	1993	Griffin
74	Roberta Abdul-Salaam	Democratic	2005	Riverdale
75	Celeste Johnson	Democratic	2007	Jonesboro
76	Mike Glanton	Democratic	2007	Jonesboro
77	Darryl Jordan	Democratic	2001	Riverdale
78	Wade Starr	Democratic	2007	Jonesboro
79	Fran Millar	Republican	1999	Atlanta
80	Mike Jacobs	Republican	2005	Brookhaven
81	Jill Chambers	Republican	2003	Atlanta
82	Kevin Levitas	Democratic	2007	Atlanta
83	Mary Margaret Oliver	Democratic	2003	Decatur
84	Stacey Abrams	Democratic	2007	Atlanta
85	Stephanie Stuckey Benfield	Democratic	1999	Atlanta
86	Karla Drenner	Democratic	2001	Avondale Estates
87	Michele D. Henson	Democratic	1991	Stone Mountain
88	Billy Mitchell	Democratic	2003	Stone Mountain
89	Earnest "Coach" Williams	Democratic	2003	Avondale Estates
90	Howard Mosby	Democratic	2003	Atlanta
91	Stan Watson	Democratic	1997	Decatur
92	Pam Stephenson	Democratic	2003	Atlanta
93	Dee Dawkins-Haigler	Democratic	2008	Lithonia
94	Randal Mangham	Democratic	2001	Lithonia
95	Robert F. Mumford	Republican	2005	Loganville
96	Pedro Rafael Marin	Democratic	2003	Duluth
97	Brooks P. Coleman, Jr.	Republican	1993	Duluth
98	Bobby Clifford Reese	Republican	2005	Buford
99	Hugh Floyd	Democratic	2003	Norcross
100	Brian W. Thomas	Democratic	2005	Lilburn
101	Mike Coan	Republican	1997	Lawrenceville
102	Clay Cox	Republican	2005	Lilburn
103	David Casas	Republican	2005	Lilburn
104	John Wilson Heard	Republican	2003	Lawrenceville
105	Donna Sheldon	Republican	2003	Dacula
106	Melvin Everson	Republican	2005	Snellville
107	Len Walker	Republican	1995	Woodbine
108	Terry Lamar England	Republican	2005	Auburn
109	Steve Davis	Republican	2005	McDonough
110	John Lunsford	Republican	2001	McDonough
111	Jeff May	Republican	2005	Monroe
112	Doug Holt	Republican	2005	Social Circle
113	Bob Smith	Republican	1999	Watkinsville
114	Keith Heard	Democratic	1993	Athens
115	Doug McKillip	Democratic	2007	Athens
116	Mickey Channell	Republican	1993	Greensboro
117	Barry A. Fleming	Republican	2003	Harlem
118	Ben L. Harbin	Republican	1995	Evans
119	Barbara Sims	Republican	2007	Augusta
120	Quincy Murphy	Democratic	2001	Augusta
121	Henry "Wayne" Howard	Democratic	1990	Augusta
122	Hardie Davis	Democratic	2007	Augusta
123	Gloria Frazier	Democratic	2007	Hephzibah
124	Sistie Hudson	Democratic	1997	Sparta
125	Jim Cole	Republican	2005	Monticello
126	David Knight	Republican	2005	Griffin
127	Billy Maddox	Republican	2007	Zebulon
128	Carl Epps	Democratic	2007	LaGrange
129	Vance Smith, Jr.	Republican	1993	Columbus
130	Debbie Buckner	Democratic	2003	Junction City
131	Richard H. Smith	Republican	2005	Columbus
132	Calvin Smyre	Democratic	1975	Columbus
133	Carolyn Hugley	Democratic	1993	Columbus
134	Mike Cheokas	Democratic	2005	Americus
135	Lynmore James	Democratic	1993	Montezuma
136	Tony Sellier	Democratic	1983	Fort Valley
137	Allen Peake	Republican	1997	Macon
138	Nikki Randall	Democratic	1999	Macon
139	David E. Lucas, Sr.	Democratic	1975	Macon
140	Allen G. Freeman	Republican	2005	Macon
141	Bobby Eugene Parham	Democratic	1975	Milledgeville
142	Jimmy Lord	Democratic	1977	Sandersville
143	DuBose Porter	Democratic	1983	Dublin
144	Jimmy Pruett	Republican	2007	Eastman
145	Willie Lee Talton	Republican	2005	Warner Robins
146	Larry O'Neal	Republican	2001	Bonaire
147	Buddy Harden	Republican	2008	Cordele
148	Bob Hanner	Democratic	1975	Parrott
149	Gerald E. Greene	Democratic	1983	Cuthbert
150	Winfred J. Dukes	Democratic	1997	Albany
151	Freddie Powell Sims	Democratic	2005	Dawson
152	Ed Rynders	Republican	2003	Albany
153	Austin Scott	Republican	1997	Tifton
154	Jay Roberts	Republican	2003	Ocilla
155	Greg Morris	Republican	1999	Vidalia
156	Larry "Butch" Parrish	Republican	1985	Swainsboro
157	Jon G. Burns	Republican	2005	Newington
158	Bob Lane	Republican	1981	Brooklet
159	Buddy Carter	Republican	2005	Pooler
160	Bob Bryant	Democratic	2005	Garden City
161	Lester Jackson	Democratic	1999	Savannah
162	J. Craig Gordon	Democratic	2007	Savannah
163	Burke Day	Republican	1995	Savannah
164	Ron Stephens	Republican	1997	Savannah
165	Al Williams	Democratic	2003	Midway
166	Terry E. Barnard	Republican	1995	Glennville
167	Roger Bert Lane	Republican	2005	Darien
168	Tommy Smith	Republican	1979	Nicholls
169	Chuck Sims	Republican	1997	Ambrose
170	Penny Houston	Republican	1997	Nashville
171	A. Richard Royal	Democratic	1983	Camilla
172	Gene Maddox	Republican	2005	Cairo
173	Mike Keown	Republican	2005	Thomasville
174	Ellis Black	Democratic	2001	Valdosta
175	Amy Carter	Democratic	2007	Valdosta
176	Jay Shaw	Democratic	1994	Lakeland
177	Mark Hatfield	Republican	2005	Waycross
178	Mark Williams	Republican	1993	Jesup
179	Jerry Keen	Republican	2001	Brunswick
180	Cecily A. Hill	Republican	2003	Woodbine

== See also ==
- List of Georgia state legislatures
