= 151st Georgia General Assembly =

Term of state legislature in US state of Georgia

←	150th	152nd	→
- Great Seal of the State of Georgia

Overview
- Legislative body: Georgia General Assembly
- Meeting place: Georgia State Capitol

Senate
- Members: 56 (36 R, 20 D)
- President of the Senate: Casey Cagle (R)
- Party control: Republican Party

House of Representatives
- Members: 180 (116 R, 63 D, 1 I)
- Speaker of the House: David Ralston (R)
- Party control: Republican Party

== Overview ==
The 151st General Assembly of the U.S. state of Georgia convened its first session on January 10, 2011, at the Georgia State Capitol in Atlanta. The 151st Georgia General Assembly succeeded the 150th and served as the precedent for the 152nd General Assembly in 2013.

== Officers ==
=== Senate ===
==== Presiding Officer ====
Position	Name	District	Party
President	Casey Cagle	n/a	Republican
President Pro Tempore	Tommie Williams	19	Republican

==== Majority leadership ====
Position	Name	District
Senate Majority Leader	Chip Rogers	21
Majority Caucus Chairman	Bill Cowsert	46
Majority Whip	Cecil Staton	18

==== Minority leadership ====
Position	Name	District
Senate Minority Leader	Robert Brown	26
Minority Caucus Chairman	Doug Stoner	6
Minority Whip	Steve Henson	41

=== House of Representatives ===
==== Presiding Officer ====
Position	Name	District	Party
Speaker of the House	David Ralston	7	Republican
Speaker Pro Tempore	Jan Jones	46	Republican

==== Majority leadership ====
Position	Name	District
House Majority Leader	Larry O'Neal	146
Majority Whip	Edward Lindsey	54
Majority Caucus Chairman	Donna Sheldon	105
Majority Caucus Vice Chairman	Matt Ramsey	72
Majority Caucus Sec./Treas.	Allen Peake	137

==== Minority leadership ====
Position	Name	District
House Minority Leader	Stacey Abrams	84
Minority Whip	Carolyn Hugley	133
Minority Caucus Chairman	Brian Thomas	100
Minority Caucus Vice Chairman	Rashad Taylor	55
Minority Caucus Secretary	Stephanie Stuckey Benfield	85

== Members of the State Senate ==
District	District	Senator	Party	First elected	Residence
1	1	Earl “Buddy” Carter	Republican	2009	Pooler
2	2	Lester Jackson	Democratic	2008	Savannah
3	3	William T. Ligon, Jr.	Republican	2010	Brunswick
4	4	Jack Hill	Republican	1990	Reidsville
5	5	Curt Thompson	Democratic	2004	Tucker
6	6	Doug Stoner	Democratic	2004	Smyrna
7	7	Greg Goggans	Republican	2004	Douglas
8	8	Tim Golden	Republican	1998	Valdosta
9	9	Don Balfour	Republican	1992	Snellville
10	10	Emanuel Jones	Democratic	2004	Decatur
11	11	John Bulloch	Republican	2002	Ockhocknee
12	12	Freddie Powell Sims	Democratic	2008	Dawson
13	13	John Crosby	Republican	2008	Tifton
14	14	George Hooks	Democratic	1990	Americus
15	15	Ed Harbison	Democratic	1992	Columbus
16	16	Ronnie Chance	Republican	2004	Tyrone
17	17	Rick Jeffares	Republican	2010	Locust Grove
18	18	Cecil Staton	Republican	2004	Macon
19	19	Tommie Williams	Republican	1998	Lyons
20	20	Ross Tolleson	Republican	2002	Perry
21	21	Chip Rogers	Republican	2004	Woodstock
22	22	Hardie Davis	Democratic	2010	Augusta
23	23	Jesse Stone	Republican	2010	Waynesboro
24	24	Bill Jackson	Republican	2007	Appling
25	25	Johnny Grant	Republican	2004	Milledgeville
26	26	Robert Brown	Democratic	1991	Macon
27	27	Jack Murphy	Republican	2006	Cumming
28	28	Mitch Seabaugh	Republican	2000	Sharpsburg
29	29	Joshua McKoon	Republican	2010	Columbus
30	30	Bill Hamrick	Republican	1999	Carrollton
31	31	Bill Heath	Republican	2004	Bremen
32	32	Judson Hill	Republican	2004	Marietta
33	33	Steve Thompson	Democratic	1990	Marietta
34	34	Valencia Seay	Democratic	2003	Riverdale
35	35	Donzella James	Democratic	2009	College Park
36	36	Nan Orrock	Democratic	2006	Atlanta
37	37	Lindsey Tippins	Republican	2010	Marietta
38	38	Horacena Tate	Democratic	1998	Atlanta
39	39	Vincent Fort	Democratic	1996	Atlanta
40	40	Fran Millar	Republican	2010	Atlanta
41	41	Steve Henson	Democratic	2002	Tucker
42	42	Jason Carter	Democratic	2010	Decatur
43	43	Ronald Ramsey, Sr.	Democratic	2006	Decatur
44	44	Gail Davenport	Democratic	2010	Jonesboro
45	45	Renee Unterman	Republican	2002	Buford
46	46	Bill Cowsert	Republican	2006	Athens
47	47	Frank Ginn	Republican	2010	Danielsville
48	48	David Shafer	Republican	2001	Duluth
49	49	Butch Miller	Republican	2010	Gainesville
50	50	Jim Butterworth	Republican	2008	Cornelia
51	51	Steve Gooch	Republican	2010	Dahlonega
52	52	Barry Loudermilk	Republican	2010	Cassville
53	53	Jeff Mullis	Republican	2000	Chickamauga
54	54	Charlie Bethel	Republican	2010	Dalton
55	55	Gloria Butler	Democratic	1999	Stone Mountain
56	56	John Albers	Republican	2010	Roswell

=== Changes in Membership from Previous Term ===
Two seats changed party control from the previous session, one due to defeat of an incumbent and the other due to a party switch (Tim Golden) the beginning of the 151st Georgia General Assembly saw thirteen new state senators. One defeated an incumbent in the general election, one defeated an incumbent in the primary, Six replaced incumbents who had run for other office. Five replaced a senator who had retired.

District	Previous	Subsequent	Reason for change
3	Jeff Chapman (R)	William T. Ligon, Jr. (R)	Ran for Governor
17	John Douglas (R)	Rick Jeffares (R)	Retired
23	J.B. Powell (D)	Jesse Stone (R)	Ran for Agriculture Commissioner
29	Seth Harp (R)	Joshua McKoon (R)	Ran for Insurance Commissioner
37	John Wiles (R)	Lindsey Tippins (R)	Defeated in Primary Runoff
40	Dan Weber (R)	Fran Millar (R)	Retired
44	Gail Buckner (D)	Gail Davenport (D)	Ran for Secretary of State
47	Ralph Hudgens (R)	Frank Ginn (R)	Ran for Insurance Commissioner
49	Lee Hawkins (R)	Butch Miller (R)	Ran for Congress
51	Chip Pearson (R)	Steve Gooch (R)	Retired
52	Preston Smith (R)	Barry Loudermilk (R)	Ran for Attorney General
54	Don Thomas (R)	Charlie Bethel (R)	Retired
56	Dan Moody (R)	John Albers (R)	Retired

== Members of the House of Representatives ==
District	Representative	Party	First elected	Residence
1	Jay Neal	Republican	2004	LaFayette
2	Martin Scott	Republican	2004	Rossville
3	Tom Weldon	Republican	2008	Ringgold
4	Roger Williams	Republican	2001	Ringgold
5	John D. Meadows, III	Republican	2004	Calhoun
6	Tom Dickson	Republican	2004	Cohutta
7	David Ralston	Republican	2002	Blue Ridge
8	Stephen Allison	Republican	2008	Blairsville
9	Amos Amerson	Republican	2000	Dahlonega
10	Terry Rogers	Republican	2008	Clarkesville
11	Barbara Massey Reece	Democratic	1998	Menlo
12	Rick Jasperse	Republican	2010	Jasper
13	Katie Dempsey	Republican	2006	Rome
14	Christian Coomer	Republican	2010	Cartersville
15	Paul Battles	Republican	2008	Cartersville
16	Rick Crawford	Democratic	2007	Cedartown
17	Howard R. Maxwell	Republican	2002	Dallas
18	Kevin Cooke	Republican	2010	Carrollton
19	Paulette Braddock	Republican	2010	Hiram
20	Charlice H. Byrd	Republican	2004	Woodstock
21	Calvin Hill	Republican	2002	Canton
22	Sean Jerguson	Republican	2006	Holly Springs
23	Mark Hamilton	Republican	2006	Cumming
24	Mike Dudgeon	Republican	2010	Suwanee
25	James Mills	Republican	1992	Gainesville
26	Carl Rogers	Republican	1994	Gainesville
27	Doug Collins	Republican	2006	Gainesville
28	Michael Harden	Republican	2008	Toccoa
29	Alan Powell	Republican	1990	Hartwell
30	Tom McCall	Republican	1994	Elberton
31	Tommy Benton	Republican	2004	Jefferson
32	Judy Manning	Republican	1996	Marietta
33	David Wilkerson	Democratic	2010	Austell
34	Rich Golick	Republican	1998	Smyrna
35	Ed Setzler	Republican	2004	Acworth
36	Earl Ehrhart	Republican	1988	Powder Springs
37	Terry Johnson	Democratic	2004	Marietta
38	Sam Teasley	Republican	2010	Marietta
39	Alisha Thomas Morgan	Democratic	2002	Austell
40	Stacey Adams	Democratic	2010	Smyrna
41	Sharon Cooper	Republican	1996	Marietta
42	Don Parsons	Republican	1994	Marietta
43	Bobby Franklin	Republican	1996	Marietta
44	Sheila Jones	Democratic	2004	Smyrna
45	Matt Dollar	Republican	2002	Marietta
46	Jan Jones	Republican	2003	Milton
47	Chuck Martin	Republican	2002	Alpharetta
48	Harry Geisinger	Republican	2004	Roswell
49	Wendell Willard	Republican	2000	Sandy Springs
50	Lynne Riley	Republican	2010	Johns Creek
51	Tom Rice	Republican	1996	Norcross
52	Joe Wilkinson	Republican	2000	Atlanta
53	Elly Dobbs	Democratic	2008	Atlanta
54	Edward Lindsey	Republican	2004	Atlanta
55	Rashad Taylor	Democratic	2008	Atlanta
56	Kathy Ashe	Democratic	1990	Atlanta
57	Pat Gardner	Democratic	2001	Atlanta
58	Simone Bell	Democratic	2009	Atlanta
59	Margaret Kaiser	Democratic	2006	Atlanta
60	Gloria Bromell Tinubu	Democratic	2010	Atlanta
61	Ralph Long, III	Democratic	2008	Atlanta
62	Joe Heckstall	Democratic	1994	East Point
63	Tyrone L. Brooks, Sr.	Democratic	1980	Atlanta
64	Roger B. Bruce	Democratic	2002	Atlanta
65	Sharon Beasley-Teague	Democratic	1992	Red Oak
66	Virgil Fludd	Democratic	2002	Tyrone
67	Bill Hembree	Republican	1998	Winston
68	Tim Bearden	Republican	2004	Villa Rica
69	Randy Nix	Republican	2006	LaGrange
70	Lynn Ratigan Smith	Republican	1996	Newnan
71	Billy Horne	Republican	2004	Newnan
72	Matt Ramsey	Republican	2006	Peachtree City
73	John P. Yates	Republican	1988	Griffin
74	Roberta Abdul-Salaam	Democratic	2004	Riverdale
75	Yasmin Neal	Democratic	2010	Jonesboro
76	Sandra Scott	Democratic	2010	Rex
77	Darryl Jordan	Democratic	2000	Riverdale
78	Glenn Baker	Democratic	2008	Jonesboro
79	Tom Taylor	Republican	2010	Dunwoody
80	Mike Jacobs	Republican	2004	Atlanta
81	Elena Parent	Democratic	2010	Atlanta
82	Scott Holcomb	Democratic	2010	Atlanta
83	Mary Margaret Oliver	Democratic	2002	Decatur
84	Stacey Abrams	Democratic	2006	Atlanta
85	Stephanie Stuckey Benfield	Democratic	1998	Atlanta
86	Karla Drenner	Democratic	2000	Avondale Estates
87	Michele D. Henson	Democratic	1990	Stone Mountain
88	Billy Mitchell	Democratic	2002	Stone Mountain
89	Earnest "Coach" Williams	Democratic	2002	Avondale Estates
90	Howard Mosby	Democratic	2002	Atlanta
91	Rahn Mayo	Democratic	2008	Atlanta
92	Pam Stephenson	Democratic	2002	Decatur
93	Dee Dawkins-Haigler	Democratic	2008	Lithonia
94	Dar'shun Kendrick	Democratic	2010	Lithonia
95	Pam Dickerson	Democratic	2010	Conyers
96	Pedro Rafael Marin	Democratic	2002	Duluth
97	Brooks P. Coleman, Jr.	Republican	1992	Duluth
98	Josh Clark	Republican	2010	Buford
99	Hugh Floyd	Democratic	2002	Norcross
100	Brian W. Thomas	Democratic	2004	Lilburn
101	Buzz Brockway	Republican	2010	Lawrenceville
102	B.J. Pak	Republican	2010	Lilburn
103	David Casas	Republican	2002	Lilburn
104	Valerie Clark	Republican	2010	Lawrenceville
105	Donna Sheldon	Republican	2002	Dacula
106	Brett Harrell	Republican	2010	Snellville
107	Tom Kirby	Republican	2011	Loganville
108	Terry Lamar England	Republican	2004	Auburn
109	Steve Davis	Republican	2004	McDonough
110	Andrew Welch	Republican	2010	McDonough
111	Bruce Williamson	Republican	2010	Monroe
112	Doug Holt	Republican	2004	Social Circle
113	VACANT			
114	Keith Heard	Democratic	1992	Athens
115	Doug McKillip	Republican	2006	Athens
116	Mickey Channell	Republican	2002	Greensboro
117	Lee Anderson	Republican	2008	Grovetown
118	Ben L. Harbin	Republican	1994	Evans
119	Barbara Sims	Republican	2006	Augusta
120	Quincy Murphy	Democratic	2002	Augusta
121	Henry Howard	Democratic	2006	Augusta
122	Earnest Smith	Democratic	2009	Augusta
123	Gloria Frazier	Democratic	2006	Hephzibah
124	Sistie Hudson	Democratic	1996	Sparta
125	Susan Holmes	Republican	2010	Monticello
126	David Knight	Republican	2004	Griffin
127	Billy Maddox	Republican	2007	Zebulon
128	Carl Von Epps	Democratic	1992	LaGrange
129	Kip Smith	Republican	2009	Columbus
130	Debbie Buckner	Democratic	2002	Junction City
131	Richard H. Smith	Republican	2004	Columbus
132	Calvin Smyre	Democratic	1974	Columbus
133	Carolyn Hugley	Democratic	1992	Columbus
134	Mike Cheokas	Republican	2004	Americus
135	Lynmore James	Democratic	1992	Montezuma
136	Robert Dickey	Republican	2011	Musella
137	Allen Peake	Republican	2006	Macon
138	Nikki Randall	Democratic	1999	Macon
139	David E. Lucas, Sr.	Democratic	1975	Macon
140	Bubber Epps	Republican	2008	Dry Branch
141	Rusty Kidd	Independent	2009	Milledgeville
142	Mack Jackson	Democratic	2008	Sandersville
143	Matt Hatchett	Republican	2010	Dublin
144	Jimmy Pruett	Republican	2006	Eastman
145	Willie Lee Talton	Republican	2004	Warner Robins
146	Larry O'Neal	Republican	2001	Bonaire
147	Buddy Harden	Republican	2008	Cordele
148	Bob Hanner	Republican	1975	Parrott
149	Gerald E. Greene	Republican	1982	Cuthbert
150	Winfred J. Dukes	Democratic	1996	Albany
151	Carol Fullerton	Democratic	2008	Albany
152	Ed Rynders	Republican	2002	Albany
153	Tony McBrayer	Republican	2010	Tifton
154	Jay Roberts	Republican	2002	Ocilla
155	Greg Morris	Republican	1998	Vidalia
156	Larry "Butch" Parrish	Republican	1984	Swainsboro
157	Jon G. Burns	Republican	2004	Newington
158	Jan Tankersley	Republican	2010	Brooklet
159	Ann Purcell	Republican	2009	Rincon
160	Bob Bryant	Democratic	2004	Garden City
161	Mickey Stephens	Democratic	2008	Savannah
162	J. Craig Gordon	Democratic	2006	Savannah
163	Ben Watson	Republican	2010	Savannah
164	Ron Stephens	Republican	1996	Savannah
165	Al Williams	Democratic	2002	Midway
166	Delvis Dutton	Republican	2010	Glennville
167	Roger Bert Lane	Republican	2004	Darien
168	Tommy Smith	Republican	1978	Nicholls
169	Chuck Sims	Republican	1996	Ambrose
170	Penny Houston	Republican	1998	Nashville
171	Jay Powell	Republican	2008	Camilla
172	Gene Maddox	Republican	2004	Cairo
173	Darlene Taylor	Republican	2010	Thomasville
174	Ellis Black	Republican	2002	Valdosta
175	Amy Carter	Republican	2006	Valdosta
176	Jason Shaw	Republican	2010	Lakeland
177	Mark Hatfield	Republican	2004	Waycross
178	Chad Nimmer	Republican	2011	Blackshear
179	Alex Atwood	Republican	2010	Brunswick
180	Jason Spencer	Republican	2010	Woodbine

=== Changes in Membership from Previous Term ===
Fourteen seats changed party control from the previous session, three due to defeat of an incumbent, three due to retirements/resignation or runs for other office and the other eight due to a party switch from the Democrats to the Republicans (Ellis Black, Amy Carter, Mike Cheokas, Bubber Epps, Gerald E. Greene, Bob Hanner, Doug McKillip, Alan Powell) the beginning of the 151st Georgia General Assembly saw thirty-four new representatives. One defeated an incumbent in the primary, three in the primary run-off, ten replaced incumbents who had run for other office. Sixteen replaced a representative who had retired.

District	Previous	Subsequent	Reason for change
14th	Barry Loudermilk (R)	Christian Coomer (R)	Ran for State Senate
18th	Mark Butler (R)	Kevin Cooke (R)	Ran for Labor Commissioner
19th	Daniel Stout (R)	Paulette Braddock (R)	Defeated in Primary Runoff
24th	Tom Knox (R)	Mike Dudgeon (R)	Ran for Insurance Commissioner
33rd	Don Wix (D)	David Wilkerson (D)	Defeated in Primary
38th	Pat Dooley (D)	Sam Teasley (R)	Defeated in General
40th	Rob Teilhet (D)	Stacey Evans (D)	Ran for Attorney General
50th	Mark Burkhalter (R)	Lynne Riley (R)	Retired
60th	Georganna Sinkfield (D)	Gloria Bromell Tinubu (D)	Ran for Secretary of State
75th	Ron Dodson (D)	Yasmin Neal (D)	Retired
76th	Mike Glanton (D)	Sandra Scott (D)	Retired
79th	Fran Millar (R)	Tom Taylor (R)	Ran for State Senate
81st	Jill Chambers (R)	Elena Parent (D)	Defeated in General
82nd	Kevin Levitas (D)	Scott Holcomb (D)	Retired
94th	Randal Mangham (D)	Dar'shun Kendrick (D)	Ran for Governor
95th	Toney Collins (D)	Pam Dickerson (D)	Defeated in Primary Runoff
98th	Bobby Reese (R)	Josh Clark (R)	Retired
101st	Mike Coan (R)	Buzz Brockway (R)	Retired
102nd	Clay Cox (R)	B.J. Pak (R)	Retired
104th	Lee Thompson (D)	Valerie Clark (R)	Defeated in General
106th	Melvin Everson (R)	Brett Harrell (R)	Retired
110th	John Lunsford (R)	Andrew Welch (R)	Retired
111th	Jeff May (R)	Bruce Williamson (R)	Retired
113th	Bob Smith (R)	Hank Huckaby (R)	Retired
125th	Jim Cole (R)	Susan Holmes (R)	Retired
143rd	DuBose Porter (D)	Matt Hatchett (R)	Ran for Governor
153rd	Austin Scott (R)	Tony McBrayer (R)	Ran for Congress
158th	Bob Lane (R)	Jan Tankersley (R)	Retired
163rd	Burke Day (R)	Ben Watson (R)	Retired
166th	Terry Barnard (R)	Delvis Dutton (R)	Retired
173rd	Mike Keown (R)	Darlene Taylor (R)	Ran for Congress
176th	Jay Shaw (D)	Jason Shaw (R)	Resigned
179th	Jerry Keen (R)	Alex Atwood (R)	Retired
180th	Cecily A. Hill (R)	Jason Spencer (R)	Defeated in Primary Runoff

=== Changes in Membership During Current Term ===
Date seat became vacant	District	Previous	Reason for change	Subsequent	Date of successor's taking office
November 30, 2010	136th	Tony Sellier (R)	Died of Congestive Heart Failure.	Robert Dickey (R)	February 16, 2011
December 9, 2010	178th	Mark Williams (R)	Resigned to serve as commissioner of the Georgia Department of Natural Resources.	Chad Nimmer (R)	February 16, 2011

== See also ==
- List of Georgia state legislatures
