= Senator Chance =

Senator Chance may refer to:

- Genie Chance (1927–1998), Alaska State Senate
- Ronnie Chance (born 1968), Georgia State Senate
