= Esther Panitch =

American politician (born 1971)

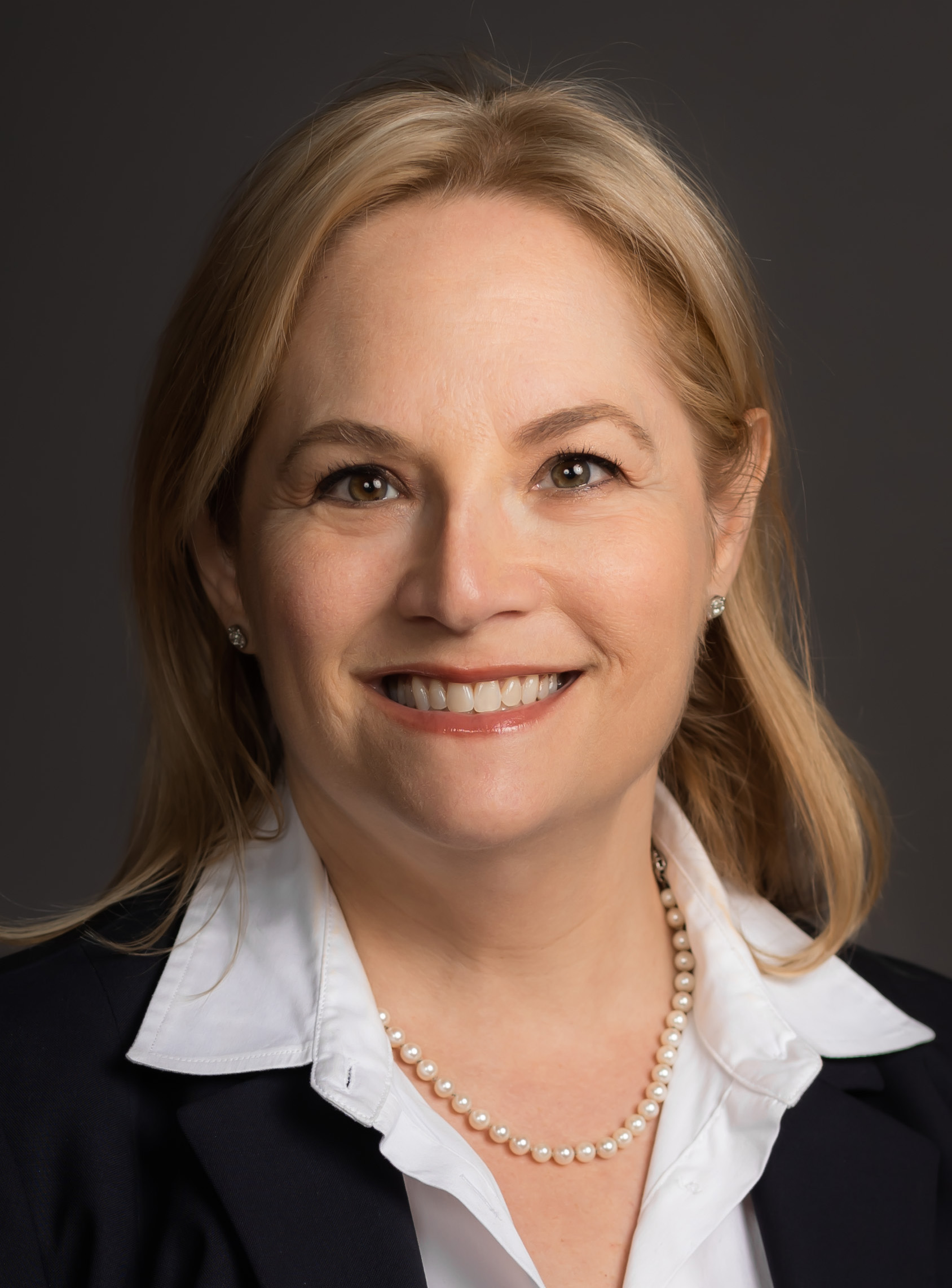

Member of the Georgia House of Representatives from the 51st district
- Incumbent
- Assumed office January 9, 2023
- Preceded by: Josh McLaurin

Personal details
- Born: Esther Dina Feuer; October 14, 1971 (age 54) Miami, Florida, U.S.
- Party: Democratic
- Spouse: Roger Panitch
- Children: 3
- Education: University of Miami (BS, JD)

Esther Dina Feuer Panitch (born October 14, 1971) is an American attorney and politician. She has served as a member of the Georgia House of Representatives representing the 51st district since 2023. She was the only Jewish member of the Georgia House of Representatives for the 157th and 158th Georgia General Assembly.

== Early life and career ==
Panitch was born in Miami, Florida and grew up in North Miami Beach, attending Lehrman Community Day School. She earned her bachelor's degree from the University of Miami in 1992 and her Juris Doctor in 1995. She describes her upbrigning as "Conservadox" and attended Camp Ramah summer camp.

After law school, Panitch worked as an assistant public defender in Miami-Dade County from 1997 to 2002. She then opened her own law practice before moving to Atlanta, Georgia, in 2004. Before opening her own private law practice in Dunwoody in 2007, she worked at the Fulton County Conflict Defender's Office.

== Political career ==
=== Elections ===
In February 2022, Panitch announced her campaign for the Georgia House of Representatives District 51 seat after Mike Wilensky, the only Jewish member of the Georgia General Assembly, announced that he would not seek re-election. The District 51 seat was open after being vacated by Josh McLaurin, who was running for the Georgia State Senate.

After winning the Democratic primary, Panitch defeated Republican nominee Peter Korman in the November general election. Both Panitch and Korman are Jewish, ensuring that the 157th Georgia General Assembly would have at least one Jewish member.

Panitch won reelection to a second term in the Georgia General Assembly in the 2024 Georgia House of Representatives election. For the 158th Georgia General Assembly, she remained the sole Jewish state legislator.

=== Tenure ===
In January 2023, Panitch invited Miriam Udel, a Yiddish professor at Emory University, to become the first female Orthodox rabbi to give the opening prayer at the Georgia House of Representatives, which she did on February 1, also making her the first female Orthodox rabbi to give an opening prayer at any state legislature.

She has said that she has been subject to antisemitism from the far-left and far-right. After the Goyim Defense League distributed antisemitic fliers in February 2023 in suburban Atlanta, including at Panitch's home, she sponsored a bill that would adopt the IHRA definition of antisemitism as Georgia law. In January 2024, Georgia governor Brian Kemp signed the bill into law, making Georgia the 11th state in the United States to adopt that definition of antisemitism. Before the signing ceremony, Panitch was sent an antisemitic postcard containing antisemitic slurs and a reference to "gassing the Jews." She has argued against claims that the bill criminalizes the criticism of Israel.

=== Zionist activism ===
Panitch buys trees in Israel through the Jewish National Fund in honor of anti-Zionist groups, such as after members of Jewish Voice for Peace (JVP) did not show up to a planned meeting in 2023. She also donated a tree in honor of the Students for Justice in Palestine chapter at the University of Georgia. She has said that holding up JVP and IfNotNow as representatives of the Jewish community is a form of tokenization.

Panitch was honored by Hadassah Women's Zionist Organization of America, of which she is a lifelong member, for her "unwavering support for Israel" in May 2025. Panitch was a part of the delegation of American lawmakers to the 50 States One Israel conference held in Israel in September 2025. Panitch said that she "couldn't be prouder to be a Jew and a Zionist; to me, they are the same".

In 2025, Panitch supported the potential candidacy of Brian Kemp in the 2026 U.S. Senate election in Georgia over fellow Jewish Democrat Jon Ossoff due to his perceived betrayal in supporting Israel and said, "Kemp has done things that I am fighting against every day, but it is a different level of betrayal that Ossoff has committed." Panitch said that that pro-Palestinian advocacy at the Democratic National Convention by fellow state representative Ruwa Romman, who is Palestinian, "helped Donald Trump win."

== Personal life ==
Panitch met her husband Roger in 1997 at a singles event at the local Jewish Federation in Miami. They have two sons and one daughter. Her children attended Young Judea summer camp.

== Electoral history ==
=== 2024 ===
Georgia House of Representatives 51st district Democratic primary election, 2024
Party	Candidate	Votes	%
Democratic	Esther Panitch (incumbent)	2,704	100%
Total votes		2,704	100%

Georgia House of Representatives 51st district general election, 2024
Party	Candidate	Votes	%
Democratic	Esther Panitch (incumbent)	16,558	58.1%
Republican	Derek Gettmann	11,959	41.9%
Total votes		28,517	100%
Democratic hold			

=== 2022 ===
Georgia House of Representatives, District 51, 2022
Party	Candidate	Votes	%
Democratic	Esther Panitch	12,754	55.8
Republican	Peter Korman	10,106	44.2
Total votes		22,860	100.00

Democratic primary, Georgia House of Representatives, District 51, 2022
Party	Candidate	Votes	%
Democratic	Esther Panitch	2,069	53.3
Democratic	Erendira Brumley	1,811	46.7
Total votes		3,880	100.00
