= Sheikh Rahman =

Bangladeshi-American politician

Member of the Georgia State Senate from the 5th district
- Incumbent
- Assumed office January 14, 2019
- Preceded by: Curt Thompson

Personal details
- Born: 15 November 1960 (age 65) Bajitpur, Kishoreganj District, Bangladesh
- Party: Democratic
- Education: University of Georgia

Sheikh Rahman (born November 15, 1960) is a Bangladeshi-American politician who has served in the Georgia State Senate from the 5th district since January 14, 2019. He is the first Muslim lawmaker in Georgia.

== Personal life ==
Rahman was born in Bangladesh. He moved to Lawrenceville, Georgia and attended Central Piedmont Community College in 1981. He graduated from the University of Georgia in 1995 with a Bachelor of Business Administration. He has a wife, Sham'e (née Afrose), and two kids, Rawda (daughter) and Anzar (son).
