= Stephanie Stuckey =

American politician and businesswoman (born 1965)

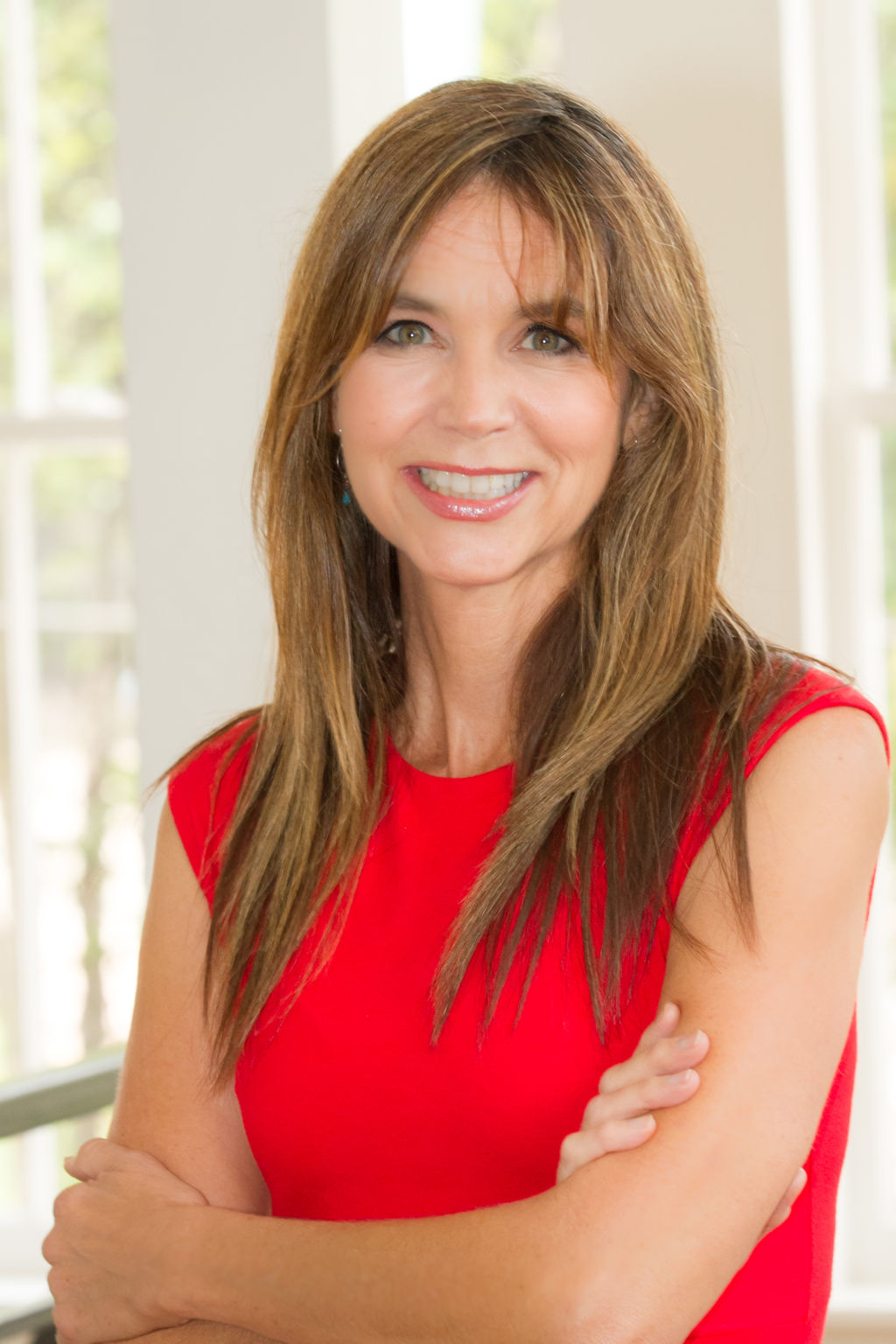

Member of the Georgia House of Representatives from the 85th district
- In office January 10, 2005 – January 14, 2013
- Preceded by: John P. Yates; John Lunsford
- Succeeded by: Karla Drenner

Member of the Georgia House of Representatives from the 56th, Post 1 district
- In office January 13, 2003 – January 10, 2005
- Preceded by: Nan Orrock
- Succeeded by: Kathy Ashe

Member of the Georgia House of Representatives from the 67th district
- In office January 11, 1999 – January 13, 2003
- Preceded by: Mike Polak
- Succeeded by: Mike Coan; James Mills

Personal details
- Born: December 25, 1965 (age 60) Eastman, Georgia, US
- Party: Democratic
- Education: University of Georgia (BA, JD)
- Occupation: CEO of Stuckey's

Ethel Stephanie Stuckey (previously Benfield; born December 25, 1965) is an American businesswoman and former Democratic Party politician from Georgia. She is currently the CEO of Stuckey's Corporation. Stuckey served in the Georgia House of Representatives from 1999 to 2013.

== Early life and education ==
The daughter of former Georgia Member of congress W. S. Stuckey Jr., who served as a member of the United States House of Representatives from 1967 to 1977. She spent her early life in Washington, D.C. Stuckey attended the University of Georgia and earned a B.A. in French in 1989. In 1992 Stuckey earned a J.D. from the University of Georgia School of Law.

== Career ==
Stuckey worked as legislative aide and attorney to Georgia Senator Mary Margaret Oliver while building her own practice. In 1998, Stuckey ran her first successful political campaign representing Dekalb County in Georgia's House of Representatives until 2013.

During the 2000 presidential election, Stuckey was a Georgia state co-chair of GoreNet. GoreNet was a group that supported the Al Gore campaign with a focus on grassroots and online organizing as well as hosting small dollar donor events.

After 14 years in the Georgia House of Representatives, Stuckey announced in 2012 that she would not seek re-election, instead taking a position as Executive Director of GreenLaw, an environmentally focused law resource center in Atlanta, Georgia.

In 2015, Stuckey was appointed by Atlanta mayor Kasim Reed to be Director of Sustainability for the City of Atlanta and then to the position of Chief Resilience Officer.

In late 2019, Stuckey purchased Stuckey's Corporation – the iconic roadside stop famous for its pecan candies and kitschy souvenirs that her grandfather founded in 1937 – for $500,000 and became the third-generation CEO of the family business. She stated that the motivating factors for purchasing the company were an emotional attachment to the family brand along with the desire to make Stuckey's both profitable and a household name again. At the time she purchased Stuckey's, the company was operating at a deficit and had only 13 original free-standing stores in 10 states that still sported the original sloped teal roofs in addition to around 65 licensed Stuckey's Express store-within-a-store locations.

Within six months, Stuckey restored Stuckey's to profitability, thanks in part to a shift in focus from licensed Stuckey's store locations to the company's classic line of candies. She also expanded the brand back into candy manufacturing with the purchase of a pecan shelling and candy plant in Wrens, Georgia in January 2021. Candy and nut sales have increased to almost 50% of the company’s revenue stream as the brand expands to more national retail locations.

== Works ==
- Stuckey, Stephanie (April 2, 2024). UnStuck. Dallas, TX: BenBella Books. ISBN 978-1-63774-478-9.

Georgia House of Representatives
Preceded by Mike Polak	Member of the Georgia House of Representatives from the 67th district 1999–2003	Succeeded by Mike Coan; James Mills
Preceded by Nan Orrock	Member of the Georgia House of Representatives from the 56th district, Post 1; 2003–2005	Succeeded by Kathy Ashe
Preceded by John P. Yates; John Lunsford	Member of the Georgia House of Representatives from the 85th district 2005–2013	Succeeded by Karla Drenner
