= Midland, Columbus, Georgia =

Midland, Georgia
- Suburban Community
- Location within Georgia Location within the United States
- Coordinates: 32°34′30″N 84°49′37.2″W
- Country: United States
- State: Georgia
- County: Muscogee, Harris
- City: Columbus
- Elevation: 551 ft (168 m)
- Time zone: UTC-5 (Eastern (EST))
  - Summer (DST): UTC-4 (EDT)
- ZIP code: 31820
- Area code: 706
- GNIS feature ID: 318098

Midland is a suburban community located in northeastern Columbus, Georgia, United States. It is largely residential with a growing commercial segment. Portions of the community also extend into southeastern Harris County. It is part of the Columbus, GA-AL Metropolitan Area.

== Location ==
The community is located in northeast Columbus along the Muscogee-Harris County line. It is generally bounded by Gray Rock Rd and Rip Shin Rd to the north in Harris County, U.S. Route 27 and Blackmon Rd to the west, unincorporated areas of Fort Benning to the south, and Midland Rd to the east. Major roads that run through the community include U.S. Route 27 Alternate, U.S. Route 80 (Fall Line Freeway), and Georgia State Route 85.
