= Michael Meyer von Bremen =

American politician

Michael S. Meyer von Bremen, is an attorney and Democratic politician from the state of Georgia, United States. He resides in Albany, Georgia.

== Early life and education ==
Born on August 19, 1957, Meyer von Bremen attended public schools in Albany and graduated from Mercer University in Macon in 1979 with a Bachelor of Arts degree in political science. He earned his Juris Doctor from Mercer's Walter F. George School of Law in 1983.

== Political career ==
Meyer von Bremen was elected to the Georgia State Senate in 1998 to represent the 12th Senatorial District, which included all of Baker, Calhoun, Clay, Dougherty, Randolph, Terrell and Quitman counties and portions of Mitchell County. He held that position until 2009, when he declined to seek re-election. Instead, in the 2008 election cycle, he ran, unsuccessfully, for a seat on the Georgia Court of Appeals. After his election defeat, Meyer von Bremen returned to the private practice of law. He later was appointed a magistrate judge.

=== State Senate ===
As a senator, Meyer von Bremen was the chairman of the Special Judiciary committee. He was also a member of the Senate Appropriations, Ethics, Judiciary and Natural Resources Committees and sat on the Joint Commission on Mental Health, Mental Retardation and Substance Abuse Committee, the Southern Legislative Conference's Economic Development, Transportation and Cultural Affairs Committee, the National Conference of State Legislators' Environment and Natural Resources Committee and the Joint Comprehensive Water Plan Study Committee. From 2002 until he left the Georgia Senate, Meyer von Bremen was the (Democratic) Senate minority leader. He was selected as a Governor's appointment to the Workforce Investment Board and a Supreme Court Appointment to the Indigent Defense Commission.

=== Judicial campaign and career ===
In 2008, Meyer von Bremen announced his candidacy for the Georgia Court of Appeals. He did not win the election and returned to private law practice. Later, he was appointed a fulltime magistrate judge of Dougherty County. He was also designated as an associate Superior and State Court Judge.

== Private practice ==
Meyer von Bremen is a partner in a private law firm. He is a member of the State Bar of Georgia and the American Bar Association. He is a member and past president of the Dougherty Circuit Bar Association and the Albany Sertoma Club. He is a past president of the College of Liberal Arts and Arts & Sciences Alumni Association for Mercer University.

== Community involvement ==
Having earned the rank of Eagle Scout in 1970, Meyer von Bremen is active in community and civic affairs. He is married to the former Peggy Hicks, and they have two children, Meg and Welsley. They are members of the Porterfield Memorial United Methodist Church in Albany where he has been on the administrative board and the board of trustees. He is also a member of the Chancel Choir. He wason the Albany Dougherty Chamber board and executive committee and the board of the Georgia Independent College Association. He was a recipient of the Robert Benham Community Service Award, The Meritorious Service Award from Mercer University, 2008 Dream Award from King Celebration, Legislator of the Year Awards from the Governors Council of Developmental Disabilities and the Georgia Association of Educators, Best Lawyers in America from 2010 to 2020.
