= Georgia's 5th Senate district =

American legislative district

Georgia's 5th State Senate district
Senator
Sheikh Rahman; D–Lawrenceville
- Demographics: 13.35% White; 26.84% Black; 45.47% Hispanic; 10.98% Asian; 0.15% Native American; 0.04% Hawaiian/Pacific Islander; 0.64% Other; 3.47% Multiracial
- Population (2020) • Voting age: 191,921; 139,394

District 5 of the Georgia Senate is a senatorial district in northeastern Metro Atlanta.

The district includes parts of Norcross, Lawrenceville, and Lilburn in Gwinnett County.

The current senator is Sheikh Rahman, a Democrat from Lawrenceville first elected in 2018.
