= Paul Battles =

American politician

Member of the Georgia House of Representatives from the 15th district
- In office January 12, 2009 – January 14, 2019
- Preceded by: Jeff Lewis
- Succeeded by: Matthew Gambill

Personal details
- Born: September 4, 1947 (age 78)
- Party: Republican

Paul Battles (born September 4, 1947) is an American politician who served in the Georgia House of Representatives from the 15th district from 2009 to 2019.
