= Glenn Richardson =

American politician

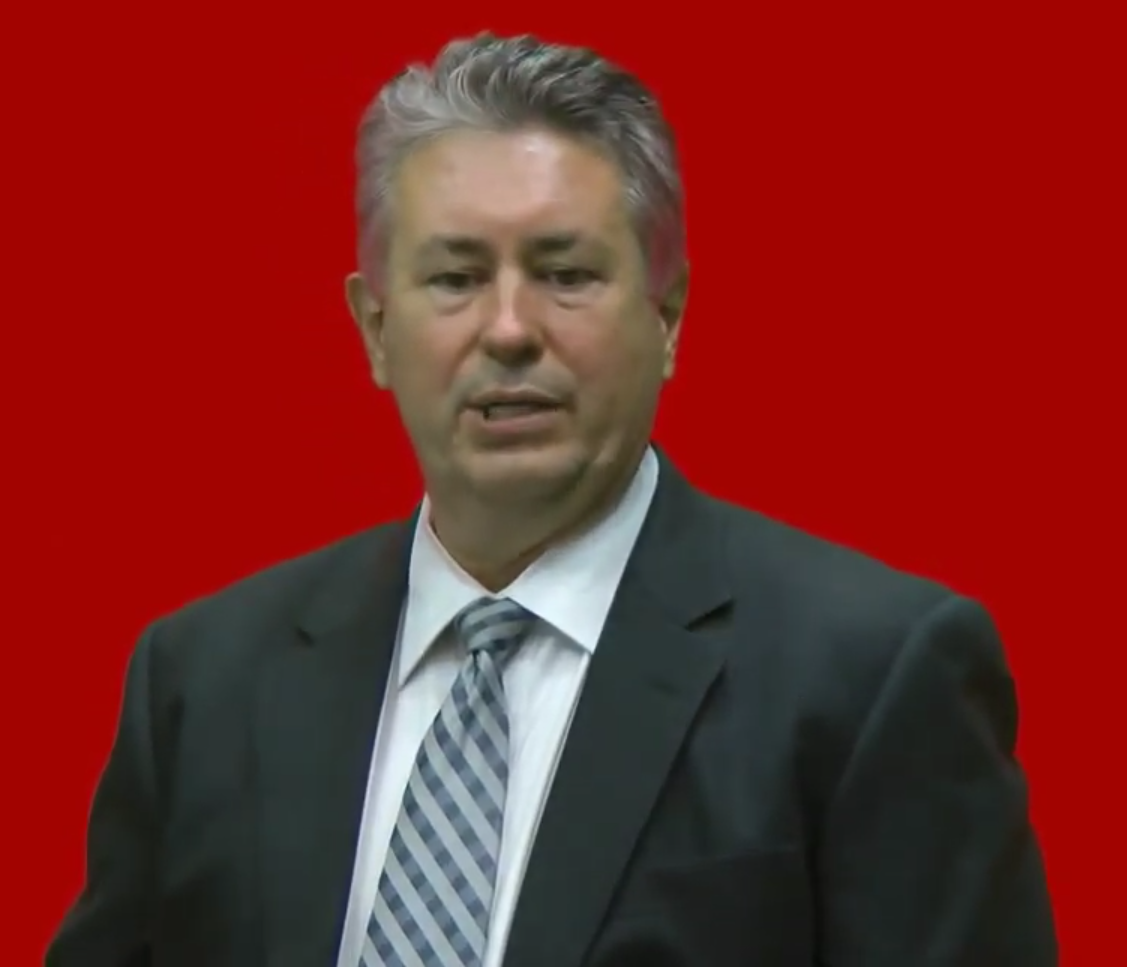

Speaker of the Georgia House of Representatives
- In office January 10, 2005 – January 1, 2010
- Preceded by: Terry Coleman
- Succeeded by: David Ralston

Minority Leader of the Georgia House of Representatives
- In office November 2003 – January 2005
- Preceded by: Lynn Westmoreland
- Succeeded by: DuBose Porter

Member of the Georgia House of Representatives from the 19th district
- In office January 2005 – January 2010
- Preceded by: Bill Cummings
- Succeeded by: Daniel Stout

Member of the Georgia House of Representatives from the 26th district
- In office January 1997 – January 2005
- Preceded by: Charlie Watts
- Succeeded by: Carl W. Rogers

County Attorney for Paulding County
- In office 1989–2005

Personal details
- Born: James Glenn Richardson; January 12, 1960 (age 66) Douglas County, Georgia, U.S.
- Party: Republican
- Education: Georgia State University, Georgia State University College of Law
- Occupation: lawyer

James Glenn Richardson (commonly known as Glenn Richardson) (born January 12, 1960) is an American attorney and the former speaker of the Georgia House of Representatives, in the state of Georgia.

In late 2009, following the announcement of a suicide attempt and revelations of marital strife involving an affair with a lobbyist, Richardson announced that he would resign as speaker, and as a member of the House, effective January 1, 2010.

== Biography ==
=== Early life ===
Richardson was born on January 12, 1960, in Douglas County, Georgia, where he graduated from Douglas County High School in 1978. In 1981, Richardson earned a Bachelor of Arts in political science from Georgia State University and earned his Juris Doctor in 1984 as a member of the first graduating class from the Georgia State University College of Law.

In 1985, Richardson joined the firm of Vinson & Osborne and made partner two years later. Now known as Talley, Richardson & Cable, he continues to practice with the same firm. In 1989, he was appointed to serve as county attorney for Paulding County and served in that position for 16 years. In 2005, he was appointed special projects and litigation attorney for Paulding County.

=== Political career ===
In 1996, Richardson became the first Republican from Paulding County elected to the Georgia House of Representatives since Robert McWhorter in 1870 during Reconstruction. In 2003, Governor Sonny Perdue hand-picked Richardson to serve as the Administration Floor Leader in the House and in November 2003, the Republican Caucus chose Richardson to serve as Minority Leader. He was elected to his sixth consecutive term in 2006 to represent House District 19. As a result of his role in securing Republican control of the House for the first time since Reconstruction, in 2005 he was chosen by his colleagues to serve as the first Republican Speaker of the House in over 130 years.

The Republican Party of Georgia named him the 2003 Legislator of the Year. He was the recipient of the 2003 American Cancer Society Capitol Dome Award. The March of Dimes recognized him "for providing extraordinary leadership in passing legislation to reduce the number of premature births in Georgia." Insider Advantage's James Magazine named him the 2005 "Man of the Year." He was also the recipient of the prestigious 2005 Wayne Shackelford Award from the Association of County Commissioners of Georgia and the James A. Coffman Award by the Medical Association of Georgia.

In 2006, Richardson became chairman of the Southern Legislative Conference (SLC) and the Republican Legislative Campaign Committee (RLCC). As chairman of the SLC, he works with other southern states to foster greater intergovernmental cooperation and communication to address regional issues. Richardson was re-elected Speaker of the Georgia House on January 8, 2007, with the support of several Democrats.

On September 12, 2012, Richardson announced he would be running for office in the Georgia State Senate District 30. In the Republican primary, Richardson finished third in a field of four.

== Legislation ==
Richardson was a major supporter of legislation in 2004 to pass a Constitutional Amendment to prohibit gay marriage. In addition, Richardson is known for saying that legislation will not pass in the Georgia House unless it passes a four-prong test: it must shrink state government, cut taxes, encourage personal responsibility, or strengthen the state.

Richardson's accomplishments in the 2007 legislative session include attempting to ensure that PeachCare, the State's health insurance program for children, remains solvent. When asked about cuts to PeachCare, Richardson said that "Peachcare and health care is not a constitutional right." In addition, Richardson has proposed increasing the sales tax in Georgia from 4% to 5.75%. This increase in the sales tax is meant to replace property taxes in Georgia.

== Controversies ==
=== Affair with lobbyist ===
The Atlanta Journal-Constitution reported that the Democratic Party of Georgia had filed an ethics complaint about Richardson based on an allegation that Richardson engaged in an "inappropriate" and "personal" relationship with a female lobbyist from Atlanta Gas Light while the company was seeking legislative approval for a $300 million pipeline across the state.

Richardson only responded by stating that "(t)he bad news for those that manufactured, dispensed and stirred unreasonably the poison is that I survived. And I'm looking for those that manufactured that poison." Despite the controversy, Richardson was re-elected Speaker of the Georgia House in January 2007.

=== Speedy divorce ===
On February 11, 2008, the Atlanta Journal-Constitution reported that "House Speaker Glenn Richardson and his wife filed for divorce, completed the dissolution of their marriage and got court records of the proceedings sealed – ." According to the AJC, this was done by Paulding Superior Court Judge James Osborne, a former law partner of Richardson's, who then sealed the records in apparent violation of the rules that govern the state's superior courts. State law requires a 30-day waiting period before uncontested divorces become final, but a judge may grant an immediate divorce after finding circumstances such as spousal abuse, incurable mental illness or adultery.

The handling of the divorce raised questions as to whether the speaker of the state House received preferential treatment from Judge James Osborne, who was not initially assigned the case but signed the order placing it under wraps. The judge, once the speaker's law partner, is now weighing a request to unseal the divorce file. He said that he has treated the Richardsons' request like any other. First Amendment advocates note there is a strong presumption to access to proceedings and records to ensure courts are treating both parties to a dispute fairly."Public access protects litigants both present and future, because justice faces its gravest threat when courts dispense it secretly", the Georgia Supreme Court said in 1988, ordering court records unsealed in a paternity suit against a Roman Catholic priest. (Atlanta Journal-Constitution July 13, 2008)

=== Resignation ===
In early November 2009, Richardson's wife publicly discussed the affair on television. Richardson admitted that he was taking pain killers and anti-depression medicine. His legal firm had taken a downturn, and he was feuding with other Republicans. On November 8, he was rescued from a suicide attempt. On December 3, 2009, he stepped down as speaker and resigned his House seat. (2009)

== See also ==
- List of speakers of the Georgia House of Representatives

Georgia House of Representatives
Preceded by Charlie Watts	Member of the Georgia House of Representatives from the 26th district 1997–2005	Succeeded by Carl W. Rogers
Preceded by Bill Cummings	Member of the Georgia House of Representatives from the 19th district 2005–2010	Succeeded by Daniel Stout
Party political offices
Preceded by Lynn Westmoreland	House Minority Leader; 2003–2005	Succeeded by DuBose Porter
Preceded by Lynn Westmoreland	House Republican Floor Leader; 2003–2005	Succeeded by Jerry Keen
Political offices
Preceded by Terry Coleman	Speaker of the Georgia House of Representatives; 2005–2010	Succeeded by David Ralston
