= Judy Manning =

Judy Manning may refer to:

- Judy Manning (lawyer) (born 1978), Canadian lawyer
- Judy Manning (politician) (1942–2025), American politician
