= Chuck Sims =

American politician

Member of the Georgia House of Representatives from the 169th district
- In office January 10, 2005 – January 12, 2015
- Preceded by: Tommy Smith
- Succeeded by: Dominic LaRiccia

Member of the Georgia House of Representatives from the 130th district
- In office January 13, 2003 – January 10, 2005
- Preceded by: Jeff Brown
- Succeeded by: Debbie Buckner

Member of the Georgia House of Representatives from the 167th district
- In office January 13, 1997 – January 13, 2003
- Preceded by: Van Street Sr.
- Succeeded by: Roger Lane

Personal details
- Born: February 19, 1958 (age 68) El Paso, Texas
- Party: Republican (2004–present)
- Other political affiliations: Democratic (before 2004)

Chuck Sims (born February 19, 1958) is an American politician of the Republican Party who served in the Georgia House of Representatives from 1997 to 2015.

After being arrested multiple times for reckless driving and driving under the influence, he didn't run for reelection in 2014.
