= Seth Harp =

American politician

Member of the Georgia State Senate from the 29th district
- In office January 10, 2002 – January 10, 2011
- Preceded by: Dan Lee
- Succeeded by: Joshua McKoon

Member of the Georgia State Senate from the 16th district
- In office January 8, 2001 – January 10, 2005
- Preceded by: Clay D. Land
- Succeeded by: Ronnie Chance

Personal details
- Born: February 26, 1943 (age 83) Monticello, Arkansas, U.S.
- Party: Republican

Seth Harp (born February 26, 1943) is an American politician who served in the Georgia State Senate from 2001 to 2011. Harp was a delegate of the Republican National Convention in 2000. Harp got a Bachelor of Pharmacy at Auburn University and a Doctor of Law from Mercer University. Harp served as a Captain of the United States Marine Corps and as an Assistant Staff Judge Advocate for the United States Naval Forces. Harp is currently a practicing Methodist. Harp is a member of the National Rifle Association of America.
