= Georgia's 43rd House of Representatives district =

State district in Georgia, USA

Georgia's 43rd State House of Representatives district
Representative
Solomon Adesanya; D–Marietta
- Demographics: 65.2% White; 15.0% Black; 6.2% Hispanic; 10.3% Asian
- Population: 58,304

District 43 elects one member of the Georgia House of Representatives. It contains parts of Cobb County.

== Members ==
- Bobby Franklin (1997–2013)
- Sharon Cooper (2013–2023)
- Solomon Adesanya (since 2023)
