= Doug McKillip =

American attorney and politician from Georgia

Member of the Georgia House of Representatives from the 115th district
- In office January 8, 2007 – January 14, 2013
- Preceded by: Jane Kidd
- Succeeded by: Bruce Williamson

Personal details
- Born: Douglas Carl McKillip; December 20, 1969 (age 56) Athens, Georgia, U.S.
- Party: Republican (2010–present); Democratic (until 2010)
- Spouse: Mary McKillip
- Children: 3
- Education: University of Georgia
- Occupation: Lawyer; politician

Douglas Carl McKillip (born December 20, 1969) is an American lawyer and politician from Georgia. McKillip is a former member of the Georgia House of Representatives from the 115th district, serving from 2007 to 2013.

== Early life ==
On December 20, 1969, McKillip was born in Athens, Georgia.

== Education ==
In 1991, McKillip earned a Bachelor of Science degree in Political Science from University of Georgia. In 1994, McKillip earned a JD degree from University of Georgia School of Law.

== Career ==
McKillip is an attorney.

On November 7, 2006, McKillip won the election and became a Democratic member of Georgia House of Representatives for District 115. McKillip defeated E.H. Culpepper and Regina Quick with 52.14% of the votes. On November 4, 2008, as an incumbent, McKillip won the election unopposed and continued serving District 115. On November 2, 2010, as an incumbent and a Democratic, McKillip won the election unopposed and continued serving District 115.

In December 2010, McKillip changed his political party from a Democrat to a Republican.

== Personal life ==
McKillip's wife is Mary McKillip. They have three children. McKillip and his family live in Athens, Georgia.
