= Bobby Franklin =

American politician

Bobby Franklin (February 13, 1957 – July 26, 2011) was an American state legislator who served in the Georgia General Assembly. Franklin was a Republican representing Georgia's District 43, which encompassed parts of northern Cobb County.

== Legislative history ==
Franklin entered the Georgia House of Representatives in 1997. At the time of his death, Franklin was Vice Chairman of the Information & Audits Committee and the Vice Chairman of the Legislative and Congressional Reapportionment Committee. He also served as a member of the Banks & Banking and Judiciary (Non-Civil) Committees. He previously served on the Natural Resources and Environment and the Special Judiciary Committees. Franklin had also served as the former Chairman of the House Legislative & Congressional Reapportionment Committee.

Franklin's private sector experience as corporate controller, CFO, and business analyst enabled him to bring sound business and fiscal principles to government. He consistently advocated for reducing the tax levels of Georgia citizens.

Representative Franklin was called by many "the conscience of the Republican Caucus" because of his beliefs that civil government should return to its (in his mind consistent) biblically and constitutionally defined roles.

Franklin voted "No" against bill HCS HB 147: Pre-Abortion Sonograms that passed the House on 19 March 2007 (116 - 54).

Sponsored by Representative Franklin and dropped in the House Hopper on January 24, 2011, House Bill 3, the "Constitutional Tender Act", which aimed to make gold and silver the only legal tender for payment of debts by and to the state of Georgia pursuant to Article I Section 10 of the U.S. Constitution. Franklin maintains that all fifty U.S. states are in violation of this Constitutional stipulation to not "make any Thing but gold and silver Coin a Tender in Payment of Debts," as paper and electronic bank notes (Federal Reserve Accounting Unit Dollars) are used nearly exclusively as tender. On February 17, 2009, Representative Franklin introduced House Bill 466 that would tax the Federal Reserve Bank of Atlanta as it would any other privately owned bank in the state of Georgia.

Franklin had sought to abolish Georgia′s Road and Tollway Authority and Department of Health and Human Services. Franklin was an opponent of public schools, stating on his weekly blog that, "The State Has No Jurisdiction To Educate Our Children — Period!" Franklin commented that public schools are a "sinking ship" and he believed that private and home schooling are a better alternative for Georgia.

In January 2011, Franklin sponsored a bill that would do away with driver′s licenses in the State of Georgia. Franklin stated that the licenses represented "oppressive times" and "licensing of drivers cannot be required of free people, because taking on the restrictions of a license requires the surrender of an inalienable right." He further stated that the freedom of movement by operating an automobile should be open to all Americans, regardless of age or driving skills. He cemented these beliefs by noting that he does not object to 12-year-old children driving cars on Georgia Highways.

In 2011 he also proposed, in House Bill 14, to amend Georgia state criminal code with regards to rape so that the new legal term "accuser" be substituted for the currently used legal term "victim," thereby theoretically no longer protecting a rape victim (in common terminology) from being billed for medical investigation of her rape if her rapist should be acquitted; the bill infuriated victims′ advocates. In House Bill 1, a bill Franklin proposed that would outlaw abortion, a section of existing Georgia statute is quoted which requires that every "spontaneous fetal death" have its cause investigated by the "proper investigating official." The bill would also make abortion punishable by death or life in prison.

Franklin was a strong opponent of abortion and gay rights. Franklin held that America has strayed from its Christian past and the country needs to be changed into a Christian nation. Franklin believed that legislation that is in direct opposition to God's word will bring about the wrath of God. In 2010, Franklin stated, "Islamic terrorism is not the greatest threat facing America. God is." Franklin claimed that President George W. Bush "praises the gods of pagan religions."

== Controversy ==
According to the Atlanta Journal-Constitution, Representative Franklin proposed ending driver's licenses in Georgia.

Franklin sponsored a bill that would require all state transactions, including the payment of taxes to the state, take place in either gold or silver.

Franklin caused controversy when he proposed Georgia House Bill One. Opponents claimed it would "require proof that a miscarriage occurred naturally." If proof could not be provided, the mother could face "felony charges". Franklin rebutted saying the claims had "no merit."

Franklin caused some controversy when he called actions made by the United States and Allied Forces in Libya "pure evil." He compared the acts of Muammar Gaddafi against his own people to American doctors providing abortions.

== Personal life ==
Representative Franklin was a graduate of Covenant College in Lookout Mountain, Georgia, where he received a degree in both Biblical Studies and Business Administration. He and his wife, Pat, were married for over 27 years. They had three children. Franklin was an active member of the Reformed Presbyterian Church.

When a friend became concerned that he did not attend church on Sunday morning, they went to his home to check on him. Franklin was found dead in his bed on July 26, 2011.

On December 26, 2011 the Cobb Medical Examiners office announced Bobby Franklin's death was caused by heart disease. A prescription bottle of Nitrostat heart medication was found in his refrigerator. Franklin's doctor, Rhett Bergeron said Franklin had a history of coronary artery disease, high blood pressure and anxiety. A few weeks before his death Franklin had complained of chest pains, according to the medical examiner's records.
