= Bob Hanner =

American politician and businessman (1945–2019)

Member of the Georgia House of Representatives
- In office September 18, 1975 – January 14, 2013
- Preceded by: John R. Irwin III
- Succeeded by: District abolished
- Constituency: 130th district (1975–1983); 131st district (1983–1993); 159th district (1993–2003); 133rd district (2003–2005); 148th district (2005–2013)

Personal details
- Born: Robert Paul Hanner; April 19, 1945 Americus, Georgia, U.S.
- Died: January 2, 2019 (aged 73) Parrott, Georgia, U.S.
- Party: Republican (2010–2019)
- Other political affiliations: Democratic (before 2010)
- Spouse: Linda Matthews (m. 1969)
- Children: 2

Robert Paul Hanner (April 19, 1945 – January 2, 2019) was an American politician and businessman.

== Biography ==
=== Early years and education ===
Robert Paul Hanner was born in Americus, Georgia on April 19, 1945 to Jack and Yip Hanner. He attended Parrott Grammar School, Terrell High School, Gordon Military College in Barnesville and Georgia Southwestern State University. He served in the United States Coast Guard in 1967 and 1968 in South Vietnam. Hanner was a farmer. He was involved in the insurance business and estate planning. He lived in Parrott, Georgia for nearly all of his life.

=== Political career ===
Hanner was a member of the Georgia House of Representatives from 1974 to 2013. He was a loyal Democrat for most of his political career, advancing to the position of committee Chairman during the decades when Democrats exercised majority rule. Hanner served during a period when House Speaker Tom Murphy waged a fiercely partisan battle against Republicans, drawing district maps during reapportionment which were criticized as pro-Democrat gerrymanders. It was during this period that Congressman Newt Gingrich remarked that "The Speaker, by raising money and gerrymandering, has sincerely dedicated a part of his career to wiping me out." Murphy made Hanner his point man in this effort, as Chairman of the House Legislative & Congressional Reapportionment committee, specifically charged with creating the gerrymandered districts. With the fall of Speaker Murphy, and the shift of power from Democrats to Republicans, Hanner left the Democratic party and switched to the Republicans in 2010.

== Death and legacy ==
Hanner died on January 2, 2019.

== See also ==
- List of American politicians who switched parties in office
