= Sean Jerguson =

American politician

Member of the Georgia House of Representatives from the 22nd district
- In office January 8, 2007 – December 5, 2012
- Preceded by: Chuck Scheid
- Succeeded by: Calvin Hill

Personal details
- Born: February 3, 1972 (age 54)
- Party: Republican

Sean Jerguson (born February 3, 1972) is an American politician who served in the Georgia House of Representatives from the 22nd district from 2007 to 2012.

Jerguson has served as Mayor of Holly Springs, and Mayor Pro-Tempore of the Holly Springs City Council.

He is a graduate of the Coverdell Leadership Institute and the Regional Leadership Institute.
