= Don Wix =

American politician

Don Wix (born May 14, 1946, in Carrollton, Georgia) is an American former politician who was a member of the Georgia General Assembly in the U.S. state of Georgia. Wix is a Democrat who represented District 33, which encompasses parts of southern Cobb County, from 1997 to 2010.

Wix graduated from the University of Georgia in Athens in 1968 with a BBA degree. He is the son of Reverend J. Edwin Wix, longtime pastor of Austell's Mt. Pisgah Baptist Church, and Mrs. Trumie Paris Wix, a teacher in Cobb County and Paulding County schools, both of whom are deceased.
