= Johnny Grant (politician) =

American politician

John Grant

Member of the Georgia State Senate from the 25th district
- In office 2005–2013
- Preceded by: Faye Smith
- Succeeded by: Burt Jones

Personal details
- Party: Republican
- Education: Georgia Tech
- Occupation: Politician

John “Johnny” Grant was an American politician. He served as a Republican Georgia State Senator, representing the 25th district of Georgia from 2005 to 2013. His district included the counties of: Baldwin, Butts, Greene, Hancock, Jasper, Jones (Pt.), Morgan, Putnam, Taliaferro, Warren (Pt.). Grant was first elected to the state legislature in 2004.

== Early life and education ==
Grant is a graduate of Georgia Tech and has a Masters from Georgia College & State University in public administration.

== Career ==
Grant won re-election in 2006–2010. He was defeated in the Republican Primary in 2012.
