= Georgia's 174th House of Representatives district =

State district in Georgia, USA

Georgia's 174th State House of Representatives district
Representative
| John Corbett; R–Lake Park |
- Demographics: 65.4% White; 23.8% Black; 8.0% Hispanic; 0.5% Asian
- Population: 55,002

District 174 elects one member of the Georgia House of Representatives. It contains the entirety of Brantley County, Charlton County, Clinch County and Echols County, as well as parts of Lowndes County and Ware County.

== Members ==
- C. Ellis Black (2001–2015)
- John Corbett (since 2015)
