= Martin Scott (politician) =

American politician and pastor from Georgia

Member of the Georgia House of Representatives from the 2nd district
- In office January 10, 2005 – January 2013
- Preceded by: Brian Davis Joyce
- Succeeded by: John Defenbaugh

Personal details
- Born: Chattanooga, Tennessee
- Party: Republican
- Spouse: Jane Scott
- Children: 4
- Education: Shorter College, Chattanooga State, Kennesaw State University
- Occupation: Businessman, teacher, realtor, politician, pastor

Martin Scott is an American businessman, educator, politician, and pastor from Georgia. Scott is a former Republican member of the Georgia House of Representatives from District 2.

== Early life ==
Scott was born in Chattanooga, Tennessee.

== Education ==
Scott earned a degree from Shorter College and Chattanooga State. Scott earned an MBA from Kennesaw State University.

== Career ==
Scott is a businessman, former teacher and realtor.

On November 2, 2004, Scott won the election and became a Republican member of Georgia House of Representatives for District 2. Scott defeated Sadie Morgan with 69.16% of the votes. On November 7, 2006, as an incumbent, Scott won the election and continued serving District 2. Scott defeated Sadie Morgan with 67.10% of the votes. On November 4, 2008, as an incumbent, Scott won the election and continued serving District 2. Scott defeated Sadie Morgan with 70.94% of the votes. On November 2, 2010, as an incumbent, Scott won the election unopposed and continued serving District 2.

In 2012, Scott founded River City Church in Rossville, Georgia. Scott is the lead pastor.

== Personal life ==
Scott's wife is Jane Scott. They have four children. Scott and his family live in Rossville, Georgia.
