= Tim Golden (politician) =

American politician

Member of the Georgia State Senate from the 8th district
- In office January 11, 1999 – January 12, 2015
- Preceded by: Loyce W. Turner
- Succeeded by: C. Ellis Black

Personal details
- Party: Democratic (1990–2010); Republican (2010-)
- Spouse: Ellen
- Education: Valdosta State University
- Occupation: Mortgage broker
- Committees: Administrative Affairs; Appropriations

Tim Golden was a member of the Georgia State Senate, representing the 8th District from January 11, 1999, to January 12, 2015. He was a member of the Georgia House of Representatives from 1990 to 1998.

== Party Switch ==
On November 28, 2010, he announced his switch from Democrat to Republican.
