= Georgia's 2nd House of Representatives district =

State district in Georgia, USA

Georgia's 2nd State House of Representatives district
Representative
Steve Tarvin; R–Chickamauga
- Demographics: 91.3% White; 3.8% Black; 3.0% Hispanic; 0.5% Asian
- Population: 52,419

District 2 elects one member of the Georgia House of Representatives. It contains parts of Catoosa County, Walker County and Whitfield County.

== Members ==
- Brian Davis Joyce (until 2005)
- Martin Scott (2005–2013)
- Jay Neal (2013)
- Steve Tarvin (since 2014)
