= Wendell Willard =

American politician (born 1940)

Member of the Georgia House of Representatives from the 51st district
- In office January 8, 2001 – January 14, 2019
- Succeeded by: Josh McLaurin

Personal details
- Born: September 12, 1940 (age 86) Decatur, Georgia, U.S.
- Party: Republican
- Education: Georgia State University; Atlanta Law School

Wendell K. Willard (born September 12, 1940) is an American politician. He was a member of the Georgia House of Representatives from the 51st District, from 2001 to 2019. He is a member of the Republican Party. An attorney, Willard practices law in metro Atlanta area. He served as appointed County Attorney for DeKalb county from 1973 to 1977 and as City Attorney for the City of Sandy Springs from December 2005 to July 2017, when he retired.
