= Mike Jacobs (Georgia politician) =

American politician from Georgia

Mike Jacobs (born May 15, 1975) is an American trial judge and former Republican politician from Georgia. Jacobs was appointed to the fifth district of the State Court of DeKalb County by Governor Nathan Deal in 2015 district five, and was unopposed for reelection in 2016 and 2020. In 2018, Jacobs became the first sitting judge in the United States to come out as bisexual. He is also the first openly LGBTQ countywide elected official in DeKalb County history.

Prior to his judicial service, Jacobs was a Republican member of the Georgia House of Representatives representing District 80, which included portions of Brookhaven, Georgia in DeKalb County and Sandy Springs, Georgia in Fulton County.

== Early life and education ==
Jacobs was born May 15, 1975, and is Jewish. Jacobs earned his Bachelor of Arts degree from Georgetown University in 1997 and his Juris Doctor from the University of Georgia School of Law in 2003.

== Career ==
=== Georgia House of Representatives ===
Jacobs was first elected to the House of Representatives in 2004 as a Democrat. He narrowly defeated his Republican opponent, J. Max Davis, by a margin of 51-49%. In 2006, he defeated Republican Tom Elliott by a margin of 66-34%. On June 19, 2007, he switched to the Republican Party. He was re-elected in 2008 (against Independent Michelle Conlon) and 2010 (against Democrat Sandy Murray) with 67% and 66% of the vote, respectively. In 2012, he was unopposed. In 2014, he defeated Catherine Bernard in the Republican Primary, 75-25%, and had no opponent in the November election.

Jacobs was chairman of the MARTA Oversight Committee (MARTOC), a joint legislative committee charged with reviewing the finances and management of Atlanta's transit system. He chaired one of two subcommittees of the House Judiciary Committee. He also served on the Transportation, Insurance, Juvenile Justice, and Budget and Fiscal Affairs Oversight committees.

According to The Atlanta Journal-Constitution, although Jacobs "was best known locally for drafting legislation creating the city of Brookhaven, he also staked out a reputation statewide as an advocate for LGBT rights. He sponsored legislation forcing the state to develop an anti-bullying policy after the suicide of an 11-year-old who was attacked by homophobic slurs. And in 2015 he halted a 'religious liberty' measure by adding an amendment that said it could not be used to discriminate against same-sex couples or others."

=== State court service ===
Following the appointment of Eleanor L. Ross to become district judge for the United States District Court for the Northern District of Georgia, Governor Nathan Deal appointed Jacobs to replace her.

=== Personal life ===
Jacobs stated that after coming out, he felt comfortable participating in groups such as the National LGBTQ+ Bar Association, the International Association of LGBTQ+ Judges, and the Stonewall Bar Association of Georgia.

== See also ==
- List of LGBT jurists in the United States
- List of American politicians who switched parties in office
