= Ross Tolleson =

American politician (1956–2021)

Member of the Georgia State Senate from the 20th district
- In office January 10, 2005 – October 30, 2015
- Preceded by: Hugh Gillis
- Succeeded by: Larry Walker III

Member of the Georgia State Senate from the 18th district
- In office January 13, 2003 – January 10, 2005
- Preceded by: Michael J. Moore
- Succeeded by: Cecil Staton

Personal details
- Born: Thorborn Ross Tolleson Jr. April 26, 1956 Perry, Georgia, U.S.
- Died: November 5, 2021 (aged 65) Perry, Georgia
- Party: Republican
- Spouse: Sally Funk
- Education: University of Georgia

Thorborn Ross Tolleson Jr. (April 26, 1956 – November 5, 2021) was a Republican state senator from Perry, Georgia closely aligned with former Governor Sonny Perdue. They are both from Houston County, Georgia. On October 30, 2015, Tolleson resigned his seat for health reasons, after a diagnosis of Alzheimer's disease.

Tolleson was a former banker, insurance salesman, and tree farmer.

Tolleson was born in Perry, Georgia on April 26, 1956, the son of the late Thorborn Ross "Buck" Tolleson Sr. and the late Mary Eolyne Shannon Tolleson. He attended The Westfield School in Perry, Georgia and graduated with the Class of 1975. He then attended the University of Georgia, where he studied general business and was a member of Kappa Alpha Order.

He became the Vice President of Tolleson Supply Company where he worked for over twenty years. He was a founder and board member of the Crossroads Bank of Perry, Georgia which was chartered in 1986. He served as chairman of the Board of Trustees of The Westfield School from 2000 - 2001. He was a Financial Advisor for UBS Paine Webber in Macon, Georgia. Alongside Lowell Shepley, he helped found the Shepley-Tolleson Financial Group.

Tolleson began his political career in 1978, serving as an intern for United States Senator Sam Nunn. He was first elected to the Georgia State Senate in 2002 to represent Georgia's 18th Senate District (which later became the 20th Senate District) succeeding Sonny Perdue, who had stepped down to successfully campaign for governor. Tolleson served in the Georgia State Senate until retiring in November 2015. He served as Chairman of the Georgia Senate Committee for Natural Resources and the Environment for 11 years. He also served as vice-chairman of the Senate Rules Committee and served on the Senate Appropriations Committee.

He was a member of the Perry United Methodist Church in Perry, Georgia.

He was married to Sally Funk Tolleson, who was his high school sweetheart, for 42 years, and had 3 children. Tolleson died on November 5, 2021, at the age of 65.
