= Robert Brown (Georgia politician) =

American politician (1950–2011)

Member of the Georgia Senate from the 26th district
- In office August 1991 – June 2011
- Succeeded by: Miriam Paris

Personal details
- Born: January 30, 1950 Greenville, Georgia, U.S.
- Died: December 8, 2011 (aged 61) Macon, Georgia, U.S.
- Party: Democratic
- Occupation: Businessman

Robert Lofton Brown (January 30, 1950 – December 8, 2011) was a Democratic member of the Georgia State Senate, representing the 26th District. He was first elected in an August 1991 special election and held office until June 2011. He was elected by his fellow Democrats as minority leader in 2004 and held that position until he resigned to run for mayor of Macon, Georgia.

== Life and career ==
Brown was born in Greenville, Georgia. He attended Mercer University in Macon, Georgia, earning his B.S. in Sociology and Christianity.

During the 1970s and 80s, Brown was involved in education policy reform for Georgia, South Carolina, and the southeastern United States. From 1971 to 1980, Brown served as a program associate and then as associate regional director of the American Friends Service Committee. Then, from 1980 to 1985, Brown served as Director of the Southeastern Public Education Program (SEPEP).

Brown was first elected in 1984 to the Bibb County Schools Board of Education. On June 14, 1991, Brown resigned from his position on the Board to campaign for the Georgia State Senate.

Brown was the first Black person to represent Bibb County in the Senate since Reconstruction, and he served in the Georgia State Senate for 20 years. Throughout his career, Brown was an advocate for education and the arts, such as with his advocacy for the preservation of the historic Douglass Theatre in downtown Macon, Georgia.

== Death ==
On December 8, 2011, Brown's body was found in his Macon home. The local coroner revealed that he died from what appeared to be a self-inflicted gunshot wound to his head.
