= Virgil Fludd =

American politician from Georgia

Member of the Georgia House of Representatives from the 64th district
- In office 2002–2017
- Preceded by: Roger Bruce
- Succeeded by: Derrick Jackson

Personal details
- Born: January 28, 1958 (age 68) Charleston, South Carolina, U.S.
- Party: Democratic

Virgil Fludd (born January 28, 1958) is an American politician. He was a member of the Georgia House of Representatives from the 64th District from 2002 to 2017. He is a member of the Democratic party.

In 2010, Fludd ran for House minority leader, but lost to Stacey Abrams. He was elected caucus chairman over Brian Thomas in 2012. Fludd opted not to seek reelection in 2016.
