= Red Oak, Georgia =

Coordinates: 33°37′20″N 84°30′00″W

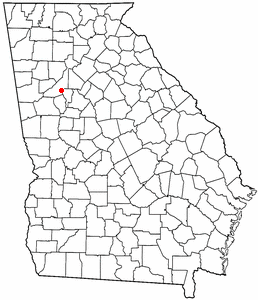
Location of Red Oak, Georgia

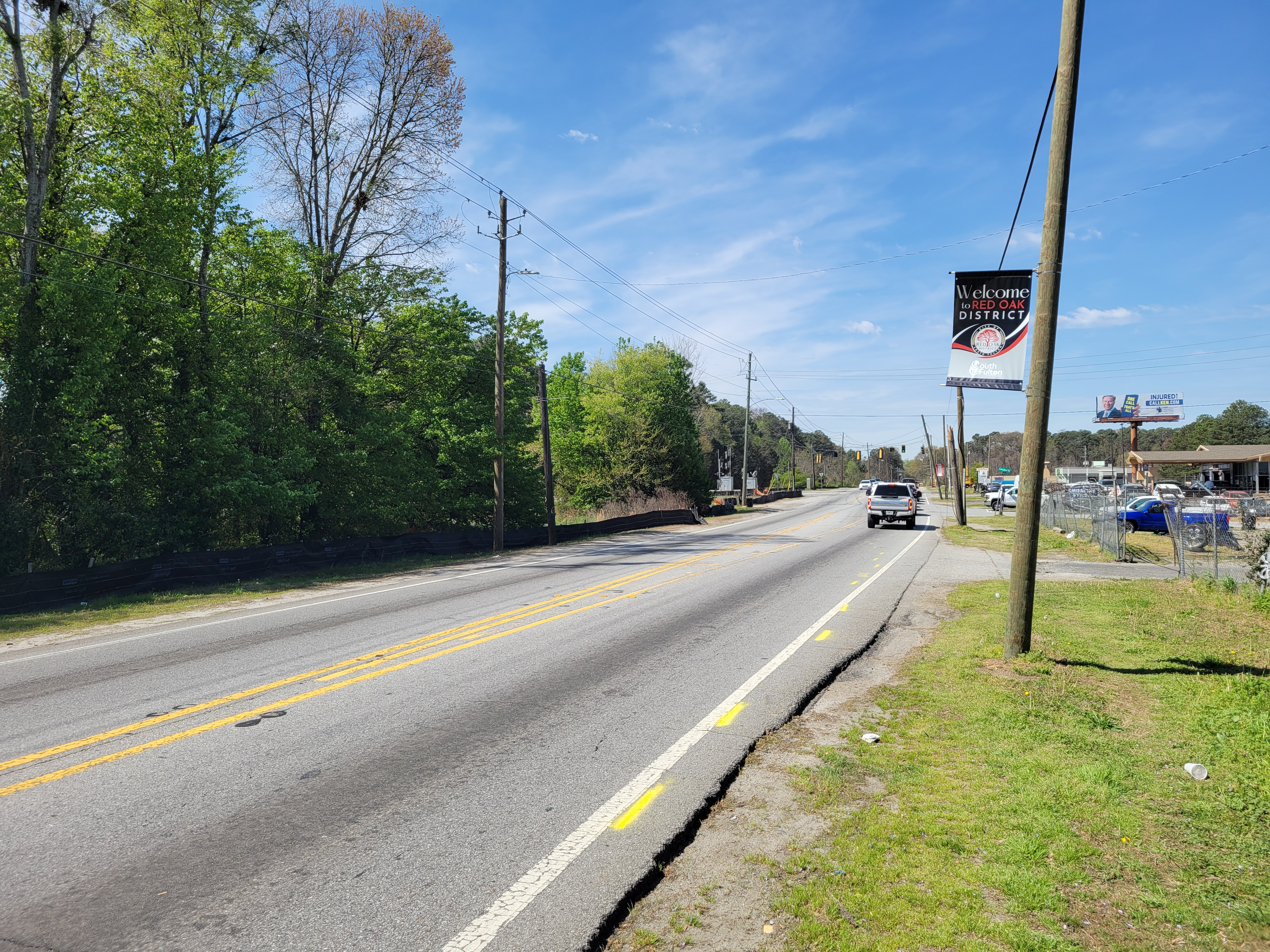
Welcome to Red Oak District

Red Oak is an area in the City of South Fulton, Fulton County, Georgia, United States, near College Park and East Point. Its ZIP Codes are 30272 and 30349 The region is located along U.S. Route 29 and the Georgia State Route 14 Connector to Interstate 85 and 285. The former terminus of SR 14 Connector is in the vicinity of post office destroyed during a civil war battle in 1864.

Through its history the community of Red Oak has never been incorporated as a town, but a post office was built in 1849. Its first postmaster was the Reverend William “Harrison” Walker (1809–1879), a Baptist minister, who came to Fayette County with his father, Levi Loudy Walker (1784–1860), and shows up on the first Fayette County census in 1830. Levi's property adjoined his son's and another son – Redmond – lived close by.

As was the custom the Red Oak post office was established on the property of the postmaster. Rev. Walker's home was in District 9, Land Lot 128 of Fayette County. On one of the early deeds to his property the Atlanta and West Point Railroad can be clearly seen crossing the property.

Local stories state a red oak tree stood at the postal stop giving the community its name – Red Oak. Today, a Georgia Historical Society marker stands at the intersection of Welcome All Road and U.S. 29/Roosevelt Highway. The marker verifies the existence of the Red Oak post office which was discontinued following the Civil War. Decades later another post office at Red Oak would be re-established and continues to this day.

In 2020, Red Oak was named one of the Historic Main Street Districts in the City of South Fulton.
