= Melvin Everson =

American minister and politician (born 1957)

Member of the Georgia House of Representatives from the 106th district
- In office September 28, 2005 – January 10, 2011
- Preceded by: Phyllis Miller
- Succeeded by: Brett Harrell

Personal details
- Born: September 24, 1957 (age 68) Abbeville, Georgia, U.S.
- Party: Republican
- Spouse: Geraldine Everson
- Children: 1
- Education: Albany State University
- Occupation: Minister, politician

Melvin Everson (born September 24, 1957) is an American minister and politician from Georgia. Everson is a former Republican member of the Georgia House of Representatives from the 106th District, serving until 2011.

== Early life ==
Everson was born in Abbeville, Georgia, on September 24, 1957. Everson's father was Northern Everson. Everson's mother was Willa B. Everson. Everson is seventh out of 10 children. As a child, Everson picked cottons and turnips. In 1975, Everson graduated from Wilcox County High School in Rochelle, Georgia.

== Education ==
In 1983, Everson earned a Bachelor of Science degree in Criminology from Albany State University. Everson graduated from the John E Reid School of Interrogation & Investigation in Chicago, Illinois, and the Coverdale Leadership Institute.

== Career ==
In 1976, Everson served in the United States Army and United States Army Reserves, until 1999.

On 2001, Everson served as a councilman of Snellville, Georgia.

In 2005, Everson became a probation officer at Professional Probation Services, until 2006.

Everson served as an associate pastor at Salem Missionary Baptist Church in Lilburn, Georgia.

On August 30, 2005, a special election was held when Phyllis Miller resigned to become a judge in a juvenile court. Everson received 41.86% of the votes while Warren Auld received 31.27% of the votes in a three-person race. On September 27, 2005, Everson won the special election and became a Republican member of Georgia House of Representatives for District 106. Everson defeated Warren Auld with 50.51% of the votes. On November 7, 2006, as an incumbent, Everson won the election and continued serving District 106. Everson defeated Tony Lentini with 66.81% of the votes. On November 4, 2008, as an incumbent, Everson won the election and continued serving District 106. Everson defeated Tony Lentini with 58.00% of the votes.

Everson was the Executive director of Georgia Workforce Development. In September 2011, Everson was appointed by Governor Nathan Deal as the Executive Director and Administrator of Georgia Commission on Equal Opportunity.

In October 2014, Everson served ministry at Cross Pointe Church in Duluth, Georgia.

Everson was the Director of Business and Industry Training at Gwinnett Technical College. In 2019, Everson became the Vice President of Economic Development at Gwinnett Technical College.

== Personal life ==
Everson's wife is Geraldine Everson. They have one child. Everson and his family live in Snellville, Georgia.
