= C. Ellis Black =

American politician

Member of the Georgia Senate from the 8th district
- In office January 12, 2015 – January 11, 2021
- Preceded by: Tim Golden
- Succeeded by: Russ Goodman

Member of the Georgia House of Representatives from the 174th district
- In office 2005 – January 12, 2015
- Preceded by: redistricting
- Succeeded by: John Corbett

Member of the Georgia House of Representatives from the 144th district
- In office 2003–2005
- Preceded by: Butch Parrish
- Succeeded by: Terry Coleman

Member of the Georgia House of Representatives from the 178th district
- In office January 8, 2001 – 2003
- Preceded by: Henry L. Reaves
- Succeeded by: redistricting

Personal details
- Born: July 28, 1942 (age 84) Clyattville, Georgia, United States
- Party: Republican (2010–present)
- Other political affiliations: Democratic (before 2010)

Calvin Ellis Black (born July 28, 1942) is an American politician. He was a member of the Georgia State Senate from the 8th District, serving from 2015 to 2021. He is a member of the Republican party. Black also served in the Georgia House of Representatives from 2001 to 2015.

Georgia House of Representatives
Preceded by Henry L. Reaves	Member of the Georgia House of Representatives from the 178th district 2001–2003	Succeeded by District abolished
Preceded by Butch Parrish	Member of the Georgia House of Representatives from the 144th district 2003–2005	Succeeded by Terry Coleman
Preceded by District established	Member of the Georgia House of Representatives from the 174th district 2005–2015	Succeeded by John Corbett
Georgia State Senate
Preceded by Tim Golden	Member of the Georgia State Senate from the 8th district 2015–2021	Succeeded by Russ Goodman
