= Jeff Chapman (politician) =

American politician

Member of the Georgia House of Representatives from the 167th district
- In office 2013–2015
- Succeeded by: Jeff Jones

Member of the Georgia Senate from the 3rd district
- In office 2005–2011

Personal details
- Born: Brunswick, Georgia, U.S.
- Party: Republican
- Occupation: Former businessman

Jeff Chapman is an American politician and former businessman. A Republican, Chapman was elected to the Georgia State Senate in 2004 and reelected in 2006 and 2008. He unsuccessfully sought the Republican nomination for governor of Georgia in the 2010 race. In 2012, he was elected to the Georgia House of Representatives, where he represented the 167th district. He was not re-elected in 2014.

== Early life ==
Chapman graduated from Glynn Academy in 1977.

== Career ==
Chapman, a businessman from Brunswick, Georgia, was a waste management executive. He began his political career as a Glynn County Commissioner, serving two terms. A Republican, he was elected to the Georgia Senate in 2004 from the Third District, and was unopposed for reelection in 2006 and 2008. He had a low profile in the Senate, having not held a Senate leadership position or major committee chairmanship.

The Savannah Morning News described Chapman as "considered a bit of a maverick"; favoring "property rights, environmental protection, water conservation, gun owner rights, open government and limiting taxes." One of Chapman's major causes was an effort to combat redevelopment on Jekyll Island.

Chapman unsuccessfully sought the Republican nomination in the 2010 Georgia gubernatorial election. During his campaign, he advocated the repeal of the state income tax and its replacement with a state sales tax. Although locally popular, he ranked low in the Republican primary polls, and was seen as a long-shot contender. Chapman placed fifth out of seven candidates in the July 2010, with 20,636 votes (3.0%).

Chapman returned to the Georgia General Assembly by winning a seat in the Georgia House of Representatives in 2012, running unopposed for House District 167. In 2014, Chapman unsuccessfully sought the Republican nomination for Georgia's 1st congressional district, coming in fourth place in the primary election with 13.2% of the vote.
