= Mitch Seabaugh =

American politician

Member of the Georgia State Senate from the 28th district
- In office January 8, 2001 – October 4, 2011
- Preceded by: Richard Price
- Succeeded by: Mike Crane

Personal details
- Born: March 18, 1960 (age 66) Cape Girardeau, Missouri
- Party: Republican

Mitch Seabaugh (born March 18, 1960) is an American politician who served in the Georgia State Senate from the 28th district from 2001 to 2011.
