= Bob Bryant (politician) =

American politician

Member of the Georgia House of Representatives from the 162nd district
- In office 2005 – February 25, 2016

Personal details
- Born: August 11, 1944 Savannah, Georgia, U.S.
- Died: February 25, 2016 (aged 71) Savannah, Georgia, U.S.
- Party: Democratic

Bob Bryant (August 11, 1944 – February 25, 2016) was an American politician.

Born in Savannah, Georgia, Bryant served in the United States Army and served in South Vietnam. He received his bachelor's degree in business administration from Columbia College. Bryant worked for the city of Savannah and for WEAS-FM radio station. He also worked for a law firm and car dealership as the general manager. Bryant lived in Garden City, Georgia. He was a member of the Georgia House of Representatives from the 162nd District, serving from 2005 until his death. He was a member of the Democratic party. He died at a hospital in Savannah, Georgia, back in 2016, after sustaining a fall.
