= Georgia's 60th House of Representatives district =

American legislative district

Georgia's 60th House district covers southeast Atlanta, Hapeville, and parts of Clayton and DeKalb counties of the U.S. state of Georgia.

== Elected representatives ==
List of Representatives to the Georgia House of Representatives from the 60th district
Member	Party	Residence	Counties represented	Term start	Term end	Ref.
J. Max Davis	Dem.			1997	2005	
Georganna Sinkfield	Dem.			2005	2011	
Gloria Tinubu	Dem.			2011	2013	
Keisha Waites	Dem.			2013	2017	
Kim Schofield	Dem.			2017	present	
