= Georgia's 137th House of Representatives district =

State district in Georgia, USA

Georgia's 137th State House of Representatives district
Representative
Debbie Buckner; D–Junction City
- Demographics: 37.5% White; 56.1% Black; 2.9% Hispanic; 1.5% Asian
- Population: 57,480

District 137 elects one member of the Georgia House of Representatives. It contains the entirety of Talbot County as well as parts of Meriwether County, Muscogee County and Troup County.

== Members ==
- Debbie Buckner (since 2013)
