= Georgia's 57th House of Representatives district =

State district in Georgia, USA

Georgia's 57th State House of Representatives district
Representative
Stacey Evans; D–Atlanta
- Demographics: 36.2% White; 53.8% Black; 4.2% Hispanic; 3.6% Asian
- Population: 58,946

District 57 elects one member of the Georgia House of Representatives. It contains parts of Fulton County.

== Members ==
- Pat Gardner (2001–2021)
- Stacey Evans (since 2021)
