= Debbie Buckner =

American politician from Georgia

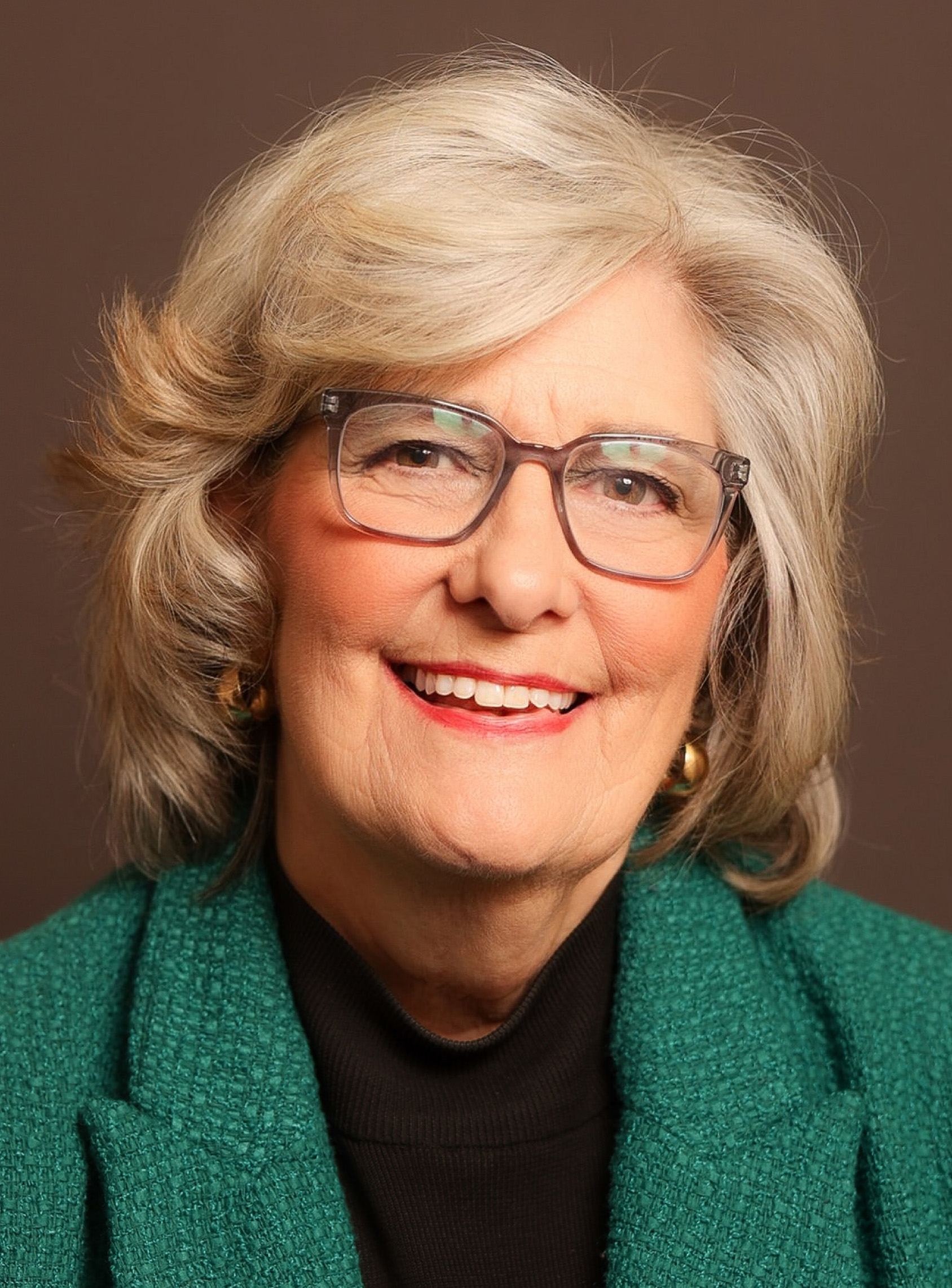

Member of the Georgia House of Representatives
- Incumbent
- Assumed office January 13, 2003
- Preceded by: Danae Roberts
- Constituency: 109th district (2003–2005); 130th district (2005–2013); 137th district (2013–present)

Personal details
- Born: March 4, 1955 (age 71) Columbus, Georgia, U.S.
- Party: Democratic
- Education: Columbus State University (B.S.); Georgia Southwestern College

Debbie Gignilliat Buckner (born March 4, 1955) is an American politician who has served in the Georgia House of Representatives since 2003.

Buckner earned a Bachelor of Science in Health Science from Columbus State University and attended Georgia Southwestern College for postgraduate work and to earn a teaching certificate. She was the former director of community benefit at Columbus Regional Healthcare System, having previously worked for Doctors Hospital as the director of community relations and the Columbus Health Department as senior public health educator.

Buckner and her husband have lived at Fielder's Mill, one of the oldest businesses in Talbot County and one of the state's last remaining operational grist mills.

Georgia House of Representatives
Preceded by John Lunsford	Member of the Georgia House of Representatives from the 109th district 2003–2005	Succeeded by Steve Davis
Preceded by Chuck Sims	Member of the Georgia House of Representatives from the 130th district 2005–2013	Succeeded by David Knight
Preceded by Allen Peake	Member of the Georgia House of Representatives from the 137th district 2013–present	Incumbent
