= Georgia's 44th Senate district =

State district in Georgia, USA

Georgia's 44th State Senate district
Senator
| Elena Parent; D–Atlanta |

District 44 of the Georgia Senate elects one member of the Georgia State Senate. It contains parts of Clayton and DeKalb counties.

== State senators ==
- Gail Buckner (2009–2011)
- Gail Davenport (2011–2025)
- Elena Parent (since 2025)

== 2026 election ==
- Saira Draper (Democrat)
- Ngozi Orabueze (Republican)
