= Barbara Massey Reece =

American politician (born 1942)

Member of the Georgia House of Representatives from the 11th district
- In office January 11, 1999 – January 14, 2013
- Preceded by: Tim Perry
- Succeeded by: Rick Jasperse

Personal details
- Born: December 22, 1942 (age 83)
- Party: Democratic

Barbara Massey Reece (born December 22, 1942) is an American politician who served in the Georgia House of Representatives from the 11th district from 1999 to 2013.
