= Greg Goggans =

American politician

Member of the Georgia State Senate from the 7th district
- In office January 10, 2005 – January 14, 2013
- Preceded by: Peg Blitch
- Succeeded by: Tyler Harper

Personal details
- Born: December 5, 1957 (age 68)
- Party: Republican

Greg Goggans (born December 5, 1957) is an American politician who served in the Georgia State Senate from the 7th district from 2005 to 2013. He won his first election in 2005, after the retirement of Peg Blitch left an open seat in the seventh district. Goggans resided in Douglas, and was an orthodontist before pursuing political office.
