= Pat Gardner =

American politician

Member of the Georgia House of Representatives from the 57th district
- In office December 7, 2001 – January 11, 2021
- Succeeded by: Stacey Evans

Personal details
- Born: March 22, 1940 (age 86)
- Party: Democratic
- Education: University of Madrid, New York University, University of Michigan
- Website: www.patgardner.org

Patricia Park Gardner (born March 22, 1940, in Alpena, Michigan ) is a Democratic member of the Georgia House of Representatives, representing the 57th District from 2001 to 2021.

== Political career ==
Gardner stood down at the 2020 Georgia House of Representatives election.

== Committees ==
She serves on the House Appropriations, Transportation, Higher Education and Natural Resources & Environment Committees and the Appropriations Committee's Health Subcommittee. She is the Treasurer of the Working Families Caucus, Chair of the Health and Welfare Subcommittee of the Fulton County Delegation, and immediate past chair of the Women's Legislative Caucus.

== Family ==
Pat is married to her husband Jerry and together they have 2 children named Anita and Bradley. Pat and her husband currently live in Morningside, Georgia.

== Education ==
Gardner received her BA from the University of Madrid and New York University Study Abroad Program. She also later attended the University of Michigan and Stephens College.
