= Terry Johnson (Georgia politician) =

American politician

- Born: 9 January 1950 (age 76); Marietta, Georgia, USA
- Occupation: Georgia State Representative (D-Marietta)
- Notable work: First elected in 2000, represents Georgia District 37, located in Cobb County
- Spouse: Nancy

Terry Johnson (born January 9, 1950) is a Georgia State Representative (D-Marietta) first elected in 2000. Johnson represents Georgia District 37, which is located in Cobb County.
