= Matt Ramsey (politician) =

American politician

Matthew Lee "Matt" Ramsey is an American politician. He served as a Republican member of the Georgia House of Representatives for the 72nd district, encompassing Peachtree City, Georgia, from 2007 through 2016. From 2013 through the end of his tenure in 2016, Ramsey served as the House Majority Whip.

== Biography ==
=== Early life ===
Matt Ramsey grew up in Fayette County, Georgia. He received a bachelor of science in political science from Georgia Southern University. In 2005, he received a J.D. from the Georgia State University College of Law.

=== Career ===
He is a lawyer in Fayette County and a partner at the law firm Warner, Hooper, and Ramsey, P.C. in Peachtree City.

=== Politics ===
He served as Mac Collins's legal staffer for eight years, focusing on tax and budget policy, transportation, energy, defense and veteran affairs.

He was elected to the Georgia House of Representatives in 2007. He served as a member of the House Appropriations, Judiciary Non-Civil, Ethics and Regulated Industries Committees. He was also the Vice-Chairman of both the Reapportionment and Special Rules Committees and the Chair of a Sub-Committee of the House Judiciary Non-Civil Committee. He was Co-Chairman of a Special Joint House and Senate Committee on Immigration Reform.

=== Personal life ===
He is married to Missy Ramsey. They have one daughter, Anna Lynne, and one son, Jacob. They live in Peachtree City, Georgia and attend the Peachtree City United Methodist Church.
