= Georgia's 141st House of Representatives district =

State district in Georgia, USA

Georgia's 141st State House of Representatives district
Representative
Carolyn Hugley; D–Columbus
- Demographics: 65.7% White; 27.2% Black; 2.4% Hispanic; 3.5% Asian
- Population: 57,259

District 141 elects one member of the Georgia House of Representatives. It contains parts of Muscogee County.

== Members ==
- Allen Peake (2010–2019)
- Dale Washburn (2019–2023)
- Carolyn Hugley (since 2023)
