= Bill Hamrick =

American politician

Georgia Statewide Business Court Judge
- Incumbent
- Assumed office September 26, 2022
- Appointed by: Brian Kemp
- Preceded by: Walt Davis

Georgia Superior Court Judge for the Coweta Circuit
- In office 2012–2022

Member of the Georgia Senate from the 30th District
- In office 2000-2012
- Preceded by: Sam P. Roberts
- Succeeded by: Mike Dugan

Personal details
- Born: William Grady Hamrick III; October 6, 1964 (age 61) Carrollton, Georgia, U.S.
- Spouse: Susan
- Education: Auburn University (BBA); Georgia State University (JD) University of Nevada, Reno Masters of Judicial Studies

William Grady Hamrick III (born October 6, 1964) is the Georgia Statewide Business Court Judge. Judge Hamrick was appointed by Governor Brian Kemp on August 3, 2022 and confirmed by the Georgia Legislature on September 14, 2022 to be the Statewide Business Court Judge of Georgia and was sworn in on September 26, 2022. Hamrick replaced Judge Walt Davis.

Prior to becoming the Business Court Judge, Judge Hamrick was a Superior Court Judge in the Coweta Circuit. He was appointed by Governor Nathan Deal and took office on September 3, 2012 to fill the seat vacated when Judge William F. Lee retired.

Prior to joining the bench, Hamrick was a Georgia State Senator elected to 30th District in 2000 in a special election. Senator Hamrick represented the citizens of Carroll, Douglas, and Paulding Counties. In the Senate, Hamrick was the chairman of the Senate Judiciary, chairman of Banking and Financial Institutions Committee, chairman of the Criminal Justice Subcommittee on Appropriations and served as vice chairman of the Senate Rules Committee. Hamrick also served on the Ethics and Public Safety Committees. Hamrick also chaired the Senate Study Committee to rewrite the Juvenile Justice Code. In 2003, he co-chaired the HOPE Scholarship Joint Study Commission to review the HOPE Scholarship and keep it viable for future generations.

From 1990 to 1992, Hamrick was a Governor's Intern and Student Prosecutor for the DeKalb County District Attorney's Office in Georgia. From 1993 to 1994, he served as an Assistant to Georgia Congressman George Darden.

A native of Carrollton, Georgia, Bill Hamrick graduated from Carrollton High School in 1983. Hamrick received a Bachelor's degree in Business Administration from Auburn University, and then in 1992 earned a J.D. degree from Georgia State University College of Law. In 2021, Judge Hamrick received a Masters in Judicial Studies from The University of Nevada, Reno.

While at Auburn University, Hamrick was president of Sigma Nu fraternity. He currently resides in Carrollton, Georgia with his wife, Susan.
