= Georgia's 51st House of Representatives district =

State district in Georgia, USA

Georgia's 51st State House of Representatives district
Representative
Esther Panitch; D–Sandy Springs
- Demographics: 59.7% White; 23.7% Black; 8.6% Hispanic; 5.5% Asian
- Population: 56,211

District 51 elects one member of the Georgia House of Representatives. It contains parts of Fulton County.

== Members ==
- Wendell Willard (2001–2019)
- Josh McLaurin (2019–2023)
- Esther Panitch (since 2023)
