= Lynmore James =

American politician (1937–2021)

Member of the Georgia House of Representatives from the 135th district
- In office January 10, 2005 – January 14, 2013
- Preceded by: Lawrence R. Roberts
- Succeeded by: Calvin Smyre

Member of the Georgia House of Representatives from the 114th district
- In office January 13, 2003 – January 10, 2005
- Preceded by: Sue Burmeister
- Succeeded by: Keith Heard

Member of the Georgia House of Representatives from the 140th district
- In office January 11, 1993 – January 13, 2003
- Succeeded by: A. Richard Royal

Personal details
- Born: August 28, 1937 Byromville, Georgia, U.S.
- Died: October 29, 2021 (aged 84)
- Party: Democratic

Lynmore James (August 28, 1937 – October 29, 2021) was an American politician who served in the Georgia House of Representatives from 1993 to 2013.

James died on October 29, 2021, at the age of 84.
