= Gail Davenport =

American politician (born 1949)

Member of the Georgia State Senate
- Incumbent
- Assumed office January 10, 2011
- Preceded by: Gail Buckner
- Constituency: 44th district (2011–2025); 17th district (2025–present)
- In office January 8, 2007 – January 12, 2009
- Preceded by: Terrell Starr
- Succeeded by: Gail Buckner
- Constituency: 44th district

Personal details
- Born: March 1, 1949 (age 77) Atlanta, Georgia, U.S.
- Party: Democratic

Gail Paulette Davenport (born March 1, 1949) is an American politician who has served in the Georgia State Senate from the 17th district and the 44th district from 2011 to 2025. She previously served in the Georgia State Senate from 2007 to 2009.
