= Curt Thompson =

American politician (born 1968)

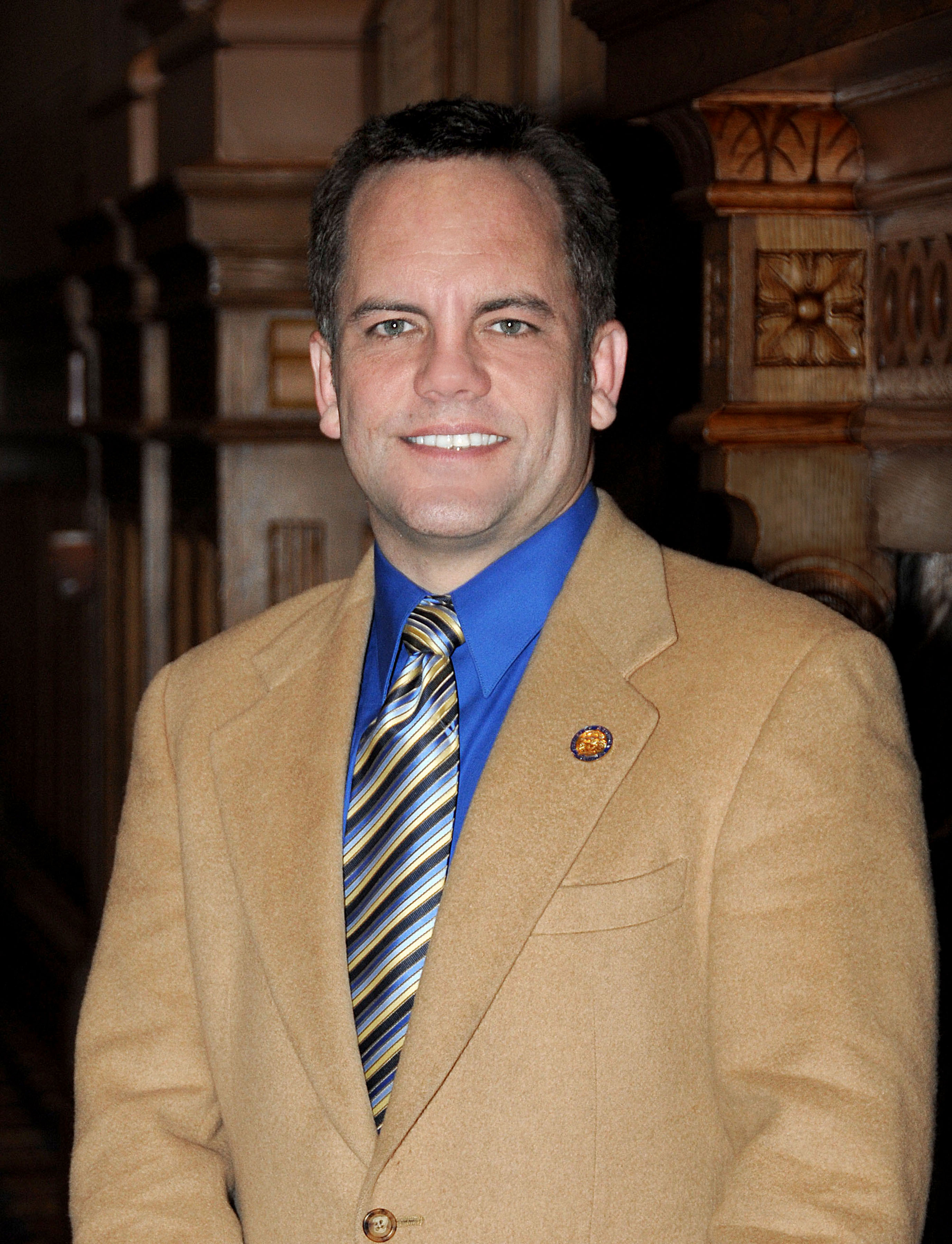
- Thompson in 2012

Member of the Georgia Senate from the 5th district
- In office 2005–2019
- Preceded by: Mary Squires
- Succeeded by: Sheikh Rahman

Member of the Georgia House of Representatives from the 69th district
- In office 2003–2005
- Preceded by: Barbara Mobley
- Succeeded by: Jeff Brown

Personal details
- Born: Curt Blackburn Thompson II; December 15, 1968 (age 57)
- Party: Democratic
- Education: American University (BA); Georgia State University (JD)
- Website: curtforgwinnett.com

Curt Blackburn Thompson II (born December 15, 1968) is an American attorney, politician, and former State Senator in the Georgia State Senate. In February, 2023, Thompson was elected to the State Transportation Board from Georgia's Congressional District 7 for a 5-year term, of which he served until February 2025, where he was redistricted out. He was elected to the state senate in 2004 and represented the 5th District. Despite being in the minority party, he served as Chair of the Special Judiciary Committee. Before his 14 years in the state senate, he served in the Georgia House of Representatives from 2003–2005.

== Biography ==
Thompson graduated from Shiloh High School in Gwinnett County, where he was a National Merit Scholar. He received his undergraduate degree in international studies and broadcast journalism from American University in Washington, D.C., and his Juris Doctor degree from Georgia State University College of Law.

Thompson is notable for his support of reproductive health, gay rights, immigration reform, and unions. He has been a vocal opponent of the high-occupancy toll lanes project in Gwinnett County since their implementation.

On May 22, 2018, Thompson was denied re-nomination for another term after losing the primary election to Sheikh Rahman.

In early 2019, Thompson announced his plans to seek the Democratic nomination for Chair of the Gwinnett County Commission in 2020.

In late 2024, Thompson was elected as Chair of the Gwinnett County Democratic Party.

== Election endorsements ==
Thompson has been endorsed and recognized by the Democracy for America, Georgia Conservation Voters, the Georgia Chamber of Commerce, and the American Cancer Society.

In 2008 and 2010 he was given an "A" rating by the NRA Political Victory Fund. This dropped to a "C-" in 2014.
