= Ronnie Chance =

American politician

Member of the Georgia State Senate from the 16th district
- In office January 10, 2005 – January 12, 2015
- Preceded by: Seth Harp
- Succeeded by: Marty Harbin

Personal details
- Born: June 6, 1968 (age 58) Atlanta, Georgia, U.S.
- Party: Republican

Ronnie Chance (born June 6, 1968) is an American politician who served in the Georgia State Senate from the 16th district from 2005 to 2015.
