= Kathy Ashe =

American politician

Member of the Georgia House of Representatives from the 56th district
- In office 1991 – January 14, 2013
- Succeeded by: Mable Thomas

Personal details
- Born: November 14, 1946 (age 79) Dekalb, Illinois, U.S.
- Party: Democratic (since 2001) Republican (until 2001)
- Spouse: Lawrence
- Education: Agnes Scott College, Emory University, Georgia State University
- Profession: Educator

Kathy Blee Ashe is a former member of the Georgia House of Representatives, representing the 56th district from 1991 until 2012. She was first elected as a Republican, but became a Democrat in early 2001. She served as Minority Caucus Secretary.
