= John P. Yates =

American politician

Representative John P. Yates

Member of the Georgia House of Representatives from the 73rd district
- In office January 11, 1993 – January 8, 2017
- Succeeded by: Karen Mathiak

Personal details
- Born: John Phillip Yates; November 24, 1921 Griffin, Georgia, U.S.
- Died: December 11, 2017 (aged 96) Griffin, Georgia, U.S.
- Party: Republican
- Spouse: Annie
- Children: 3
- Education: Georgia State University

John Phillip Yates (November 24, 1921 – December 11, 2017) was an American Republican politician who served as a Member of the Georgia House of Representatives, representing the 73rd District from 1993 until 2016. He was the chairman of the House Defense & Veterans Affairs committee and also served on the Appropriations, Motor Vehicles, and Legislative & Congressional Reapportionment committees.

== Biography ==
Yates was born in Griffin, Georgia. After attending school in Spalding County, Georgia, he attended Georgia State University where he graduated with a BPA. He was a veteran of World War II, serving in the Army, having fought in the Battle of the Bulge. He flew over 200 missions during his service, attaining the rank of second lieutenant. After the war, Yates worked for the Ford Motor Company for 35 years. He was elected to the House of Representatives in 1989, the first Republican to be elected from the 73rd district, in 1988. After his defeat at the next election, he was re-elected again in 1992. Yates died of December 11, 2017.

== Border Patrol controversy ==
In 2010, Yates generated controversy when he stated at a debate that agents of the United States Border Patrol should be able to shoot and kill people attempting to cross illegally into the United States. The Anti-Defamation League and Georgia Association of Latino Elected Officials were strongly condemning of the remarks, referring to them as "outrageous", "hate speech", and as "grossly offensive". Yates later defended his comments in an interview with a news station, stating that "[illegal immigrants] have to [be stopped] some way", drawing the comparison to enemies of the country.
