= Allen Peake =

American politician

Member of the Georgia House of Representatives from the 141st district
- In office 2010 – January 14, 2019
- Succeeded by: Dale Washburn

Personal details
- Born: February 17, 1961 (age 65) Macon, Georgia, U.S.
- Party: Republican

Allen Peake (born February 17, 1961) is an American politician. He previously served as a member of the Georgia House of Representatives from the 141st District, serving from 2007 until Jan. 14, 2019. He is a member of the Republican Party.

Allen Peake is also the CEO of a restaurant franchise business and distributes marijuana extracts to Georgia residents who are allowed to possess marijuana but cannot obtain it legally.
