= 2010 United States state legislative elections =

- November 2, 2010

88 legislative chambers in 46 states
	Majority party	Minority party	Third party
Party	Republican	Democratic	Coalition
Chambers before	37	61	1 (Note: The Alaska Senate was controlled by a coalition of Democrats and Republicans. The minority caucus consists of Republicans who were not part of the majority coalition.)
Chambers after	57	40	1
Overall change	▲20	▼21 (Note: The Oregon House of Representatives was tied in the 2011-2013 session. This is not included in the total.)	Steady
- Map of upper house elections: Democrats retained control Republicans gained control Republicans retained control Coalition retained control Non-partisan legislature No regularly-scheduled elections

- Map of lower house elections: Democrats retained control Republicans gained control Republicans retained control Split body formed Non-partisan legislature No regularly-scheduled elections

The 2010 United States state legislative elections were held on November 2, 2010, halfway through President Barack Obama's first term in office. Elections were held for 88 legislative chambers, with all states but Louisiana, Mississippi, New Jersey, and Virginia holding elections in at least one house. Kansas and New Mexico held elections for their lower, but not upper houses. Four territorial chambers in three territories and the District of Columbia were up as well. The winners of this election cycle served in their respective legislatures for either two or four-year terms, depending on state election rules.

Owing to the slow recovery from the Great Recession, the unpopularity of Democratic president Barack Obama, and the highly publicized and chaotic passage of the Affordable Care Act, Republicans scored record gains. They net a total of 680 seats and took control of 20 legislative chambers, while the Democrats lost 21 chambers.

The Republican victories gave the party unprecedented power over the redrawing of congressional and state legislative districts following the 2010 census. They also used their newfound majorities to pass conservative legislation in a number of states, weakening labor unions, cracking down on illegal immigration, restricting abortion access, cutting taxes, and reducing government regulation.

== Background ==
Partisan control of state legislatures following the 2008 and 2009 elections Democratic control (27) Republican control (14) Split control (8) Nonpartisan legislature (1)

The 2008 elections saw a nationwide Democratic wave election, including the election of Barack Obama to the presidency, as well as the expansion of Democratic majorities in the Senate and House of Representatives. At the state legislative level, Democrats won control of 27 state legislatures, while Republicans only held 14, with 8 divided between parties. Democrats showed great strength across the country in that election, primarily losing ground only in the South, where they lost control of the Oklahoma Senate and the Tennessee House of Representatives.

== Issues ==
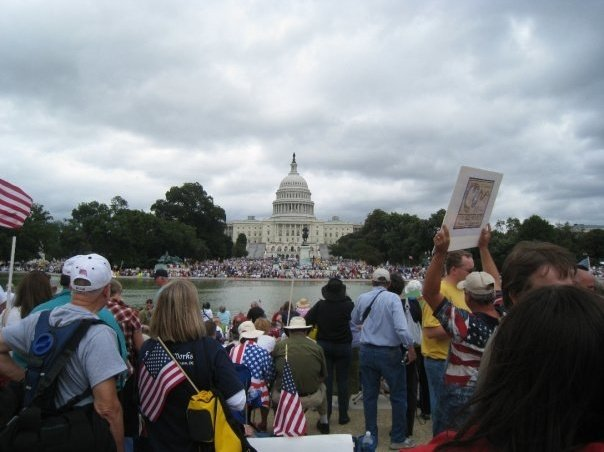
Tea Party protesters on the West Lawn of the U.S. Capitol and the National Mall at the Taxpayer March on Washington on September 12, 2009

The 2010 elections were held during the middle of President Barack Obama's first presidential term. Obama had taken office during the Great Recession, and signed several laws meant to counteract it, including the American Recovery and Reinvestment Act of 2009. He also passed significant healthcare reform through the Affordable Care Act, a highly-controversial effort that a majority of Americans disapproved of at time. Other significant issues included illegal immigration and terrorism. By the time of the election, large pluralities of American voters sided with Republicans more than Democrats on these issues, with Democrats only above water on healthcare and environmental policy.

The conservative Tea Party movement grew significantly in 2009 and 2010, staging large protests in response to legislation passed by the Obama administration.

Behind the scenes, Republicans aggressively targeted state legislative races in states where they could gain complete control of the redistricting process following the 2010 census through the project REDMAP.

== Summary table ==
Regularly scheduled elections were held in 88 of the 99 state legislative chambers in the United States; nationwide, regularly scheduled elections were held for 6,064 of the 7,383 legislative seats. Most legislative chambers held elections for all seats, but some legislative chambers that use staggered elections held elections for only a portion of the total seats in the chamber. The chambers that were not up for election either hold regularly scheduled elections in odd-numbered years, or have four-year terms and hold all regularly scheduled elections in presidential election years.

Note that this table only covers regularly scheduled elections; additional special elections took place concurrently with these regularly scheduled elections.

State	Upper House				Lower House			
State	Seats up	Total	% up	Term	Seats up	Total	% up	Term
Alabama	35	35	100	4	105	105	100	4
Alaska	10	20	50	4	40	40	100	2
Arizona	30	30	100	2	60	60	100	2
Arkansas	18	35	51	2/4 (Note: The upper houses of Arkansas, Delaware, Florida, Hawaii, Illinois, Minnesota, New Jersey, and Texas use a 2-4-4 term length system.)	100	100	100	2
California	20	40	50	4	80	80	100	2
Colorado	17	35	49	4	65	65	100	2
Connecticut	36	36	100	2	151	151	100	2
Delaware	10	21	48	2/4	41	41	100	2
Florida	20	40	50	2/4	120	120	100	2
Georgia	56	56	100	2	180	180	100	2
Hawaii	12	25	48	2/4	51	51	100	2
Idaho	35	35	100	2	70	70	100	2
Illinois	39	59	66	2/4	118	118	100	2
Indiana	25	50	50	4	100	100	100	2
Iowa	25	50	50	4	100	100	100	2
Kansas	0	40	0	4	125	125	100	2
Kentucky	19	38	50	4	100	100	100	2
Louisiana	0	39	0	4	0	105	0	4
Maine	35	35	100	2	151	151	100	2
Maryland	47	47	100	4	141	141	100	4
Massachusetts	40	40	100	2	160	160	100	2
Michigan	38	38	100	4	110	110	100	2
Minnesota	67	67	100	2/4	134	134	100	2
Mississippi	0	52	0	4	0	122	0	4
Missouri	17	34	50	4	163	163	100	2
Montana	25	50	50	4	100	100	100	2
Nebraska	24 (Note: These figures represent the seats of Nebraska's unicameral legislature.)	49	49	4	N/A (unicameral)			
Nevada	11	21	52	4	42	42	100	2
New Hampshire	24	24	100	2	400	400	100	2
New Jersey	0	40	0	2/4	0	80	0	2
New Mexico	0	42	100	4	70	70	100	2
New York	62	62	100	2	150	150	100	2
North Carolina	50	50	100	2	120	120	100	2
North Dakota	24	47	51	4	47	94	50	4
Ohio	16	33	52	4	99	99	100	2
Oklahoma	24	48	50	4	101	101	100	2
Oregon	15	30	50	4	60	60	100	2
Pennsylvania	25	50	50	4	203	203	100	2
Rhode Island	38	38	100	2	75	75	100	2
South Carolina	0	46	0	4	124	124	100	2
South Dakota	35	35	100	2	70	70	100	2
Tennessee	17	33	52	4	99	99	100	2
Texas	15	31	48	2/4	150	150	100	2
Utah	14	29	48	4	75	75	100	2
Vermont	30	30	100	2	150	150	100	2
Virginia	0	40	0	4	0	100	0	2
Washington	25	49	49	4	98	98	100	2
West Virginia	17	34	50	4	100	100	100	2
Wisconsin	17	33	52	4	99	99	100	2
Wyoming	15	30	50	4	60	60	100	2
Total	1105	1971	56	N/A	4958	5411	92	N/A

== Electoral predictions ==
Analysts predicted a very strong showing for the Republicans, anticipating a nationwide wave election in their favor. This was attributed to the nation's slow recovery from the Great Recession, the chaotic passage and implementation of the Affordable Care Act, immigration, and the large number of legislative chambers and governorships that Democrats controlled after the 2006 and 2008 elections. As the campaign progressed, Democratic prospects only became worse, leading to the largest gap in legislative chambers held by each party considered vulnerable in over a decade. By election day, Republicans were expected to be able to flip between eleven and twenty seven legislative chambers from Democrats, with only one Republican-held chamber considered vulnerable.

Ratings are designated as follows:

- "Tossup": Competitive, no advantage
- "Lean": Competitive, slight advantage
- "Likely": Not competitive, but opposition could make significant gains
- "Safe": Not competitive at all

State	Chamber	Last election	Ballotpedia Oct. 2010	Governing Nov. 1, 2010	Result
Alabama	Senate	D 23–12	Tossup	Lean R (flip)	R 22–12–1
Alabama	House of Representatives	D 62–43	Tossup	Lean R (flip)	R 62–43
Alaska	Senate	Coal. 16–4	Lean R (flip)	Tossup	Coal. 15–5
Alaska	House of Representatives	R 22–18	Likely R	Lean R	R 24–16
Arizona	Senate	R 18–12	Safe R	Safe R	R 21–9
Arizona	House of Representatives	R 35–25	Safe R	Safe R	R 40–20
Arkansas	Senate	D 27–8	Safe D	Safe D	D 20–15
Arkansas	House of Representatives	D 71–28–1	Safe D	Safe D	D 55–45
California	State Senate	D 25–15	Safe D	Safe D	D 25–15
California	State Assembly	D 51–29	Safe D	Safe D	D 52–28
Colorado	Senate	D 21–14	Lean D	Lean D	D 20–15
Colorado	House of Representatives	D 38–27	Tossup	Tossup	R 33–32
Connecticut	State Senate	D 24–12	Safe D	Safe D	D 23–13
Connecticut	House of Representatives	D 114–37	Safe D	Safe D	D 100–51
Delaware	Senate	D 16–5	Safe D	Safe D	D 14–7
Delaware	House of Representatives	D 24–17	Lean D	Lean D	D 26–15
Florida	Senate	R 26–14	Safe R	Safe R	R 28–12
Florida	House of Representatives	R 76–44	Safe R	Safe R	R 81–39
Georgia	State Senate	R 34–22	Safe R	Safe R	R 35–21
Georgia	House of Representatives	R 105–74–1	Safe R	Safe R	R 108–71–1
Hawaii	Senate	D 23–2	Safe D	Safe D	D 24–1
Hawaii	House of Representatives	D 45–6	Safe D	Safe D	D 43–8
Idaho	Senate	R 28–7	Safe R	Safe R	R 28–7
Idaho	House of Representatives	R 52–18	Safe R	Safe R	R 57–13
Illinois	Senate	D 37–22	Likely D	Likely D	D 35–24
Illinois	House of Representatives	D 70–48	Likely D	Lean D	D 64–54
Indiana	Senate	R 33–17	Safe R	Safe R	R 37–13
Indiana	House of Representatives	D 52–48	Lean R (flip)	Lean R (flip)	R 60–40
Iowa	Senate	D 32–18	Lean R (flip)	Lean D	D 26–24
Iowa	House of Representatives	D 57–43	Tossup	Tossup	R 60–40
Kansas	House of Representatives	R 77–48	Safe R	Safe R	R 92–33
Kentucky	Senate	R 21–16–1	Likely R	Likely R	R 22–15–1
Kentucky	House of Representatives	D 65–35	Likely D	Likely D	D 58–42
Maine	Senate	D 20–15	Tossup	Tossup	R 20–14–1
Maine	House of Representatives	D 95–55–1	Likely D	Likely D	R 77–73–1
Maryland	Senate	D 33–14	Safe D	Safe D	D 35–12
Maryland	House of Delegates	D 104–37	Safe D	Safe D	D 98–43
Massachusetts	Senate	D 35–5	Safe D	Safe D	D 36–4
Massachusetts	House of Representatives	D 144–15–1	Safe D	Safe D	D 130–30
Michigan	Senate	R 21–17	Likely R	Likely R	R 26–12
Michigan	House of Representatives	D 67–43	Lean D	Tossup	R 63–47
Minnesota	Senate	D 44–23	Likely D	Likely D	R 37–30
Minnesota	House of Representatives	D 87–47	Lean D	Lean D	R 72–62
Missouri	Senate	R 23–11	Safe R	Safe R	R 26–8
Missouri	House of Representatives	R 89–74	Safe R	Safe R	R 106–57
Montana	Senate	R 27–23	Likely R	Likely R	R 28–22
Montana	House of Representatives	D 50–50	Lean R (flip)	Lean R (flip)	R 68–32
Nevada	Senate	D 12–9	Likely D	Lean D	D 11–10
Nevada	Assembly	D 28–14	Likely D	Likely D	D 26–16
New Hampshire	Senate	D 14–10	Tossup	Lean R (flip)	R 19–5
New Hampshire	House of Representatives	D 225–175	Tossup	Lean R (flip)	R 298–102
New Mexico	House of Representatives	D 45–25	Likely D	Likely D	D 36–34
New York	State Senate	D 32–30	Tossup	Tossup	R 32–30
New York	State Assembly	D 107–41–1–1	Safe D	Safe D	D 99–50–1
North Carolina	Senate	D 30–20	Tossup	Tossup	R 31–19
North Carolina	House of Representatives	D 68–52	Tossup	Tossup	R 67–52–1
North Dakota	Senate	R 26–21	Safe R	Safe R	R 35–12
North Dakota	House of Representatives	R 58–36	Safe R	Safe R	R 69–25
Ohio	Senate	R 21–12	Safe R	Safe R	R 23–10
Ohio	House of Representatives	D 53–46	Lean R (flip)	Lean R (flip)	R 59–40
Oklahoma	Senate	R 26–22	Safe R	Safe R	R 32–16
Oklahoma	House of Representatives	R 61–40	Safe R	Safe R	R 70–31
Oregon	State Senate	D 18–12	Lean D	Lean D	D 16–14
Oregon	House of Representatives	D 36–24	Likely D	Likely D	30–30
Pennsylvania	State Senate	R 30–20	Safe R	Safe R	R 30–20
Pennsylvania	House of Representatives	D 104–99	Lean R (flip)	Lean R (flip)	R 112–91
Rhode Island	Senate	D 33–4–1	Safe D	Safe D	D 29–8–1
Rhode Island	House of Representatives	D 69–6	Safe D	Safe D	D 65–10
South Carolina	House of Representatives	R 73–51	Safe R	Safe R	R 76–48
South Dakota	Senate	R 21–14	Safe R	Safe R	R 29–6
South Dakota	House of Representatives	R 46–24	Safe R	Safe R	R 50–19–1
Tennessee	Senate	R 19–14	Likely R	Likely R	R 20–13
Tennessee	House of Representatives	R 50–49	Likely R	Likely R	R 64–34–1
Texas	Senate	R 19–12	Safe R	Safe R	R 19–12
Texas	House of Representatives	R 76–74	Likely R	Likely R	R 99–51
Utah	State Senate	R 21–8	Safe R	Safe R	R 22–7
Utah	House of Representatives	R 53–22	Safe R	Safe R	R 58–17
Vermont	Senate	D 23–7	Safe D	Safe D	D 21–8–1
Vermont	House of Representatives	D 94–48–5–3	Safe D	Safe D	D 94–48–5–3
Washington	State Senate	D 31–18	Lean D	Lean D	D 27–22
Washington	House of Representatives	D 62–36	Lean D	Lean D	D 56–42
West Virginia	Senate	D 26–8	Safe D	Safe D	D 28–6
West Virginia	House of Delegates	D 71–29	Safe D	Safe D	D 65–35
Wisconsin	Senate	D 18–15	Tossup	Lean R (flip)	R 19–14
Wisconsin	State Assembly	D 52–46–1	Lean R (flip)	Lean R (flip)	R 60–38–1
Wyoming	Senate	R 23–7	Safe R	Safe R	R 26–4
Wyoming	House of Representatives	R 41–19	Safe R	Safe R	R 50–10

== National results ==
Lower house results by party
Party	Seats before (Note: Counts seats that were vacant prior to the election towards the party that last held them)	Chambers before	Seats after	+/-	Chambers after	+/-
Republican	2,360	16	2,907	▲547	29	▲13
Democratic	3,030	33	2,485	▼545	19	▼14
Independent	14	0	13	▼1	0	Steady
Progressive	5	0	5	Steady	0	Steady
Independence	1	0	1	Steady	0	Steady
Working Families	1	0	0	▼1	0	Steady
Total	5,411	49	5,411	—	49	—

Upper house results by party (Note: Counts seats in the officially nonpartisan Nebraska legislature towards the party that endorsed each candidate)
Party	Seats before (Note: Counts seats that were vacant prior to the election towards the party that last held them)	Chambers before	Seats after	+/-	Chambers after	+/-
Republican	925	21	1,055	▲130	28	▲7
Democratic	1,043	28	911	▼132	21	▼7
Independent	3	0	4	▲1	0	Steady
Progressive	0	0	1	▲1	0	Steady
Total	1,971	50	1,971	—	50	—

Republicans made substantial gains in state legislatures across the nation. Twenty chambers flipped from Democratic to Republican control, giving Republicans full control of eleven state legislatures and control of one chamber in Colorado, Iowa, and New York. Additionally, Republicans gained enough seats in the Oregon House of Representatives to produce a 30-30 party split, pushing Democrats into a power-sharing agreement that resulted in the election of two "co-speakers" (one from each party) to lead the chamber. Republicans gained a net of 680 seats in state legislative races, breaking the previous record of 628 flipped seats set by Democrats in the post-Watergate elections of 1974.

Six states saw both chambers switch from Democrat to Republican majorities: Alabama (where the Republicans won a majority and a trifecta for the first time since 1874), Maine (for the first time since 1975 and a trifecta for the first time since 1965), Minnesota (for the first time since 1915 in partisan elections and 1973 in non-partisan elections), New Hampshire, North Carolina (for the first time since 1896), and Wisconsin. In addition, by picking up the lower chambers in Indiana, Ohio, Michigan, Montana (Note: Prior to the 2010 election, the 100 seats in the Montana House of Representatives were evenly split between Democrats and Republicans, but the Democratic Party controlled the chamber by virtue of holding the governor's office.) and Pennsylvania, Republicans gained control of both chambers in an additional five states. Further, Republicans picked up one chamber from Democrats in Colorado, Iowa, and New York to split control in those states. They expanded majorities in both chambers in Texas, Florida, and Georgia.

=== Post-election party switching ===
Total net change in legislative seats due to post-election party switching +1 Rep seat +2 Rep seats +4–5 Rep seats +9 Rep seats

Between the November general election and January 2011, 25 Democratic state legislators switched parties and became Republicans. These legislators were primarily conservative, White Democrats from the South who felt that the views of the Republican party more closely aligned with their own. This party switching gave Republicans control of the Louisiana House of Representatives, which did not hold regularly scheduled elections in 2010, for the first time since Reconstruction prior to the start of the 2011 session.

State	Chamber	District	Legislator	Old party	New party	Source
Alabama	House	17	Mike Millican	Democratic	Republican	
Alabama	House	35	Steve Hurst	Democratic	Republican	
Alabama	House	80	Lesley Vance	Democratic	Republican	
Alabama	House	89	Alan Boothe	Democratic	Republican	
Georgia	Senate	8	Tim Golden	Democratic	Republican	
Georgia	House	29	Alan Powell	Democratic	Republican	
Georgia	House	115	Doug McKillip	Democratic	Republican	
Georgia	House	134	Mike Cheokas	Democratic	Republican	
Georgia	House	144	Bubber Epps	Democratic	Republican	
Georgia	House	148	Bob Hanner	Democratic	Republican	
Georgia	House	149	Gerald Greene	Democratic	Republican	
Georgia	House	174	Ellis Black	Democratic	Republican	
Georgia	House	175	Amy Carter	Democratic	Republican	
Kansas	Senate	6	Chris Steineger	Democratic	Republican	
Louisiana	Senate	8	John Alario	Democratic	Republican	
Louisiana	Senate	30	John Smith	Democratic	Republican	
Louisiana	House	20	Noble Ellington	Democratic	Republican	
Louisiana	House	46	Fred Mills	Democratic	Republican	
Louisiana	House	95	Walker Hines	Democratic	Republican	
Maine	House	5	Michael Willette	Democratic	Republican	
Mississippi	Senate	39	Cindy Hyde-Smith	Democratic	Republican	
Mississippi	House	89	Bobby Shows	Democratic	Republican	
South Dakota	Senate	17	Eldon Nygarrd	Democratic	Republican	
Texas	House	21	Allan Ritter	Democratic	Republican	
Texas	House	40	Aaron Peña	Democratic	Republican	

== Impact ==
The massive Republican gains made in 2010 immensely strengthened their position on the national stage. This had both short-term effects, such as their ability to counter the policies of president Barack Obama, as well as long term consequences due to the impending redistricting cycle. In the short term, these elections heralded in a conservative shift in state legislatures across the country, especially in the states where Republicans gained complete control. This led to a tightening of policies surrounding abortion and illegal immigration, a loosening of tax policy, and the curtailing of the power of labor unions. Many of these states refused to accept the Medicaid expansion offered by the Affordable Care Act meant to close the Medicaid coverage gap.

=== Immigration ===
For the past several years, immigration policy had become an increasingly-important issue in state legislatures. In April 2010, the Arizona legislature passed Arizona SB 1070, which was considered at the time to be the strictest anti-illegal immigration bill in the country. Following the 2010 elections, a number of states, some of which had just become Republican-controlled, passed measures in the same vein as the Arizona law. The most controversial among these was Alabama HB 56, which gave police wide discretion to detain those they suspected of being undocumented immigrants, banned undocumented immigrants from receiving any public benefits, including attending public universities, and required public schools to enquire about the immigration statuses of their students. The immigration laws passed in both Alabama and Georgia received heavy criticism for their potentially devastating impacts on state agriculture, where many farmers relied on immigrant labor to harvest their crops. Many of the strictest portions of these laws were later blocked by federal courts.

The direct impact of the enforcement of these laws was often minimal, with many such as Arizona SB 1070 producing no arrests in its first few months on the books. The widest-reaching effects of these laws, however were social: changing attitudes of both immigrants and citizens. Some viewed the new laws as passed both in response to the backlash to the recent rise in illegal immigration as well as further fueling said backlash. Opponents of these laws criticized them as "Juan Crow" laws which created a climate of fear in immigrant populations. Alabama in particular saw a significant drop in public school attendance among Hispanic students despite HB 56 not barring the attendance of undocumented immigrants. Many undocumented immigrants decided to leave the states that passed these laws, citing both the laws themselves and their cultural impacts. One study from the University of Alabama estimated that the economic costs to the state in GDP of the loss of workers and taxpayers could reach as high as $11 billion annually.

=== Labor unions ===
Three states where Republicans gained complete control of state government in 2010, Indiana, Michigan, and Wisconsin, would establish right-to-work laws during the following decade. States passed a number of other wide-ranging bills to weaken public-sector unions, most notoriously in Wisconsin with the passage of Act 10, which led to massive protests and recall elections in 2011. Efforts to pass a similar bill in Ohio failed after a veto referendum overwhelmingly rejected it in 2011.

Partisan control of congressional redistricting after the 2010 elections, with the number of U.S. House seats each state will receive. Democratic control Republican control Split or bipartisan control Independent redistricting commission No redistricting necessary

=== Redistricting ===
Republicans' massive state legislative gains timed perfectly with the release of the results of the 2010 census, giving the party unprecedented control over congressional and legislative district maps until after the 2020 elections. Republicans, knowing this ahead of time, deliberately targeted vulnerable Democratic incumbents and Democratic-held legislative chambers in order to maximize their power in the upcoming redistricting cycle. As a result, Republicans fully controlled the redistricting of 210 congressional districts across 18 states, minimizing Democratic control to a mere 44 congressional districts across 6 states. The impact of this was most immediately felt during the 2012 elections, where Barack Obama won the presidential election and Democratic U.S. House candidates won a plurality of the nationwide popular vote, but Republicans maintained control of the chamber.

== Legacy ==
The 2010 midterms ushered in an era of Republican dominance of statewide politics fueled by a Democratic collapse in white, rural, and southern regions of the country.

Democrats lost significant ground in majority-White, rural areas across the former Confederacy in the 2010 and 2011 elections due to both electoral losses and party switching. Democrats lost more and more ground throughout the 2010s and have gained virtually none of it back since. Republican hold (651) Republican gain through election (127) Representative switched to the Republican Party (32) Democratic hold (502) Democratic gain through election (9) Independent hold (4) Independent gain through election (1)

=== Southern, rural Democratic fall ===
Democrats had been slowly losing ground in the rural South for the past several decades leading up to the 2010 elections. Democrats lost nearly every southern legislative chamber up for election in 2010, with White, rural incumbents primarily falling victim. Republicans successfully tied the conservative Democrats in these seats to the more liberal national party, eroding their local support and tying them to policies unpopular in their districts. A number of incumbents who survived would later switch to the Republican party, with many doing so before or immediately after the election. This left most Southern Democratic caucuses primarily made up of African American and Hispanic legislators, often based in urban areas, with a nearly extinct White, rural caucus, and a weakened but slowly growing suburban caucus. By 2014, Republicans controlled every governorship, U.S. Senate seat, and legislative chamber in the Deep South.

The 2010 elections sparked a sharp decline in Democratic support in rural areas across the country, even outside the South. Throughout the decade, this led to a strengthening correlation between population density and political party support. At the same time, increased political polarization made it more challenging for conservative Democrats to win in areas which voted for Republicans in presidential elections, culminating in Republicans flipping the Kentucky House of Representatives in 2016, the final Democratic-controlled legislative chamber in a deeply Republican state.

=== Midwest ===
Bolstered by heavily gerrymandered legislative maps, the 2010s saw a sharply-conservative turn in Midwestern state policy. By the end of the decade, five Midwestern states had adopted right-to-work laws, with a sixth, Missouri, rejecting one in a 2018 veto referendum. These policies remained in place even as Democrats made gains in statewide elections in these states, winning the governorships in Wisconsin, Michigan, and Pennsylvania in 2018. Democrats won the aggregate popular vote in the lower house elections in all three of these states, but they did not win control of any of them due to gerrymandering. Democrats would only begin to be able to reverse these policies after the implementation of new legislative maps in the 2020s. In other states, such as Ohio, Democrats have been unable to regain power in any meaningful form since their 2010 losses.

=== Donald Trump ===
The Tea Party movement's success in the 2010 election predicated the rise of Donald Trump as the dominant force in the Republican Party. Tea Party candidates ran on anti-establishment credentials, favoring low taxes, minimal government intervention, and fierce social conservatism. These became defining features of Trump's 2016 presidential campaign, the rise of the Make American Great Again movement, and Trumpism. Many of the regions outside the South where Republicans made the largest gains in 2010 swung sharply towards Donald Trump in the 2016 election despite having voted for Barack Obama again in the 2012 election.

== Maps ==
Partisan control of state governments following the 2010 elections
Democrats gained control
Democrats retained control
Split government formed
Split government maintained
Republicans gained control
Republicans retained control

Upper house seats by party holding majority in each state
Republican 50–60% 60–70% 70–80% 80–90%	Democratic 50–60% 60–70% 70–80% 80–90% 90–100%	Tie 50%

Lower house seats by party holding majority in each state
Republican 50–60% 60–70% 70–80% 80–90%	Democratic 50–60% 60–70% 80–90%	Tie 50%

Net changes to upper house seats after the 2010 elections
+1 Rep seat +2 Rep seats +3–5 Rep seats
+6–11 Rep seats +16 Rep seats
+1 Dem seat +2 Dem seats
+1 Prog seat

Net changes to lower house seats after the 2010 elections
+2 Rep seats +3–5 Rep seats +6–15 Rep seats
+17–25 Rep seats +122 Rep seats
+2 Dem seats

== State summaries ==
=== Alabama ===
Senate results

House of Representatives results

All of the seats of the Alabama Legislature were up for election. Republicans flipped control of both state legislative chambers, winning them for the first time since 1874. After the election, an additional four Democratic state representatives switched parties, giving Republicans a supermajority in the chamber.

Alabama Senate
Party	Before	After	Change
Republican	14	22	▲8
Independent	1	1	Steady
Democratic	20	12	▼8
Total	35	35	

Alabama House of Representatives
Party	Before	After	Change
Republican	45	62	▲17
Democratic	60	43	▼17
Total	105	105	

=== Alaska ===
All of the seats of the Alaska House of Representatives and half of the Alaska Senate were up for election. The Democratic-led coalition maintained control of the Senate while Republicans maintained control of the House.

Alaska Senate
Party	Before	After	Change
Democratic	10	10	Steady
Republican	6	5	Steady
Republican	4	5	Steady
Total	20	20	

Alaska House of Representatives
Party	Before	After	Change
Republican	22	24	▲2
Democratic	18	4	▼2
Democratic	18	12	▼2
Total	40	40	

=== Arizona ===
Senate results

House of Representatives results

All of the seats of the Arizona Legislature were up for election. Republicans maintained control of both state legislative chambers.

Arizona Senate
Party	Before	After	Change
Republican	18	21	▲3
Democratic	12	9	▼3
Total	30	30	

Arizona House of Representatives
Party	Before	After	Change
Republican	35	40	▲5
Democratic	25	20	▼5
Total	60	60	

=== Arkansas ===
Senate results

House of Representatives results

All of the seats of the Arkansas House of Representatives and half of the Arkansas Senate were up for election. Democrats maintained control of both state legislative chambers but with substantially reduced majorities.

Arkansas Senate
Party	Before	After	Change
Democratic	27	20	▼7
Republican	8	15	▲7
Total	35	35	

Arkansas House of Representatives
Party	Before	After	Change
Democratic	72	55	▼17
Republican	28	45	▲17
Total	100	100	

=== California ===
Senate results

State Assembly results

All of the seats of the California House of Representatives and half of the California Senate were up for election. Democrats maintained control of both state legislative chambers.

California State Senate
Party	Before	After	Change
Democratic	25	25	Steady
Republican	15	15	Steady
Total	40	40	

California State Assembly
Party	Before	After	Change
Democratic	50	52	▲2
Republican	29	28	▼1
Independent	1	0	▼1
Total	80	80	

=== Colorado ===
Senate results

All of the seats of the Colorado House of Representatives and half of the Colorado Senate were up for election. Republicans won control of the House while Democrats maintained control of the Senate.

Colorado Senate
Party	Before	After	Change
Democratic	21	20	▼1
Republican	14	15	▲1
Total	35	35	

Colorado House of Representatives
Party	Before	After	Change
Republican	27	33	▲6
Democratic	38	32	▼6
Total	65	65	

=== Connecticut ===
Senate results

House of Representatives results

All of the seats of the Connecticut Legislature were up for election. Democrats maintained control of both state legislative chambers.

Connecticut State Senate
Party	Before	After	Change
Democratic	24	23	▼1
Republican	12	13	▲1
Total	36	36	

Connecticut House of Representatives
Party	Before	After	Change
Democratic	114	100	▼14
Republican	37	51	▲14
Total	151	151	

=== Delaware ===
Senate results

House of Representatives election

All of the seats of the Delaware House of Representatives and half of the Delaware Senate were up for election. Democrats maintained control of both state legislative chambers.

Delaware Senate
Party	Before	After	Change
Democratic	15	14	▼1
Republican	6	7	▲1
Total	21	21	

Delaware House of Representatives
Party	Before	After	Change
Democratic	24	26	▲2
Republican	17	15	▼2
Total	41	41	

=== Florida ===
House of Representatives results

All of the seats of the Florida House of Representatives and half of the Florida Senate were up for election. Republicans maintained control of both state legislative chambers.

Florida Senate
Party	Before	After	Change
Republican	26	28	▲2
Democratic	14	12	▼2
Total	40	40	

Florida House of Representatives
Party	Before	After	Change
Republican	76	81	▲5
Democratic	44	39	▼5
Total	120	120	

=== Georgia ===
Senate results

House of Representatives results

All of the seats of the Georgia Legislature were up for election. Republicans maintained control of both state legislative chambers, slightly expanding their majorities in each. Immediately following the election, one Democratic senator and eight Democratic representatives switched parties and became Republicans, further bolstering their majorities.

Georgia State Senate
Party	Before	After	Change
Republican	34	35	▲1
Democratic	22	21	▼1
Total	56	56	

Georgia House of Representatives
Party	Before	After	Change
Republican	105	108	▲3
Democratic	74	71	▼3
Independent	1	1	Steady
Total	180	180	

=== Hawaii ===
All of the seats of the Hawaii House of Representatives and half of the Hawaii Senate were up for election. Democrats maintained control of both state legislative chambers.

Hawaii Senate
Party	Before	After	Change
Democratic	23	24	▲1
Republican	2	1	▼1
Total	25	25	

Hawaii House of Representatives
Party	Before	After	Change
Democratic	45	43	▼2
Republican	6	8	▲2
Total	51	51	

=== Idaho ===
All of the seats of the Idaho Legislature were up for election. Republicans maintained control of both state legislative chambers.

Idaho Senate
Party	Before	After	Change
Republican	28	28	Steady
Democratic	7	7	Steady
Total	35	35	

Idaho House of Representatives
Party	Before	After	Change
Republican	52	57	▲5
Democratic	18	13	▼5
Total	70	70	

=== Illinois ===
Senate results

House of Representatives results

All of the seats of the Illinois House of Representatives and 1/3rd of the Illinois Senate were up for election. Democrats maintained control of both state legislative chambers.

Illinois Senate
Party	Before	After	Change
Democratic	37	35	▼2
Republican	22	24	▲2
Total	59	59	

Illinois House of Representatives
Party	Before	After	Change
Democratic	70	64	▼6
Republican	48	54	▲6
Total	118	118	

=== Indiana ===
House of Representatives results

All of the seats of the Indiana House of Representatives and half of the Indiana Senate were up for election. Republicans expanded their majority in the Senate and flipped control of the House of Representatives, winning their largest legislative gains in over 25 years.

Indiana Senate
Party	Before	After	Change
Republican	33	37	▲4
Democratic	17	13	▼4
Total	50	50	

Indiana House of Representatives
Party	Before	After	Change
Republican	48	60	▲12
Democratic	52	40	▼12
Total	100	100	

=== Iowa ===
Senate results

All of the seats of the Iowa House of Representatives and half of the Iowa Senate were up for election. Republicans won control of the House of Representatives and Democrats maintained control of the Senate.

Iowa Senate
Party	Before	After	Change
Democratic	32	26	▼6
Republican	18	24	▲6
Total	50	50	

Iowa House of Representatives
Party	Before	After	Change
Republican	43	60	▲17
Democratic	57	40	▼17
Total	100	100	

=== Kansas ===
All of the seats of the Kansas House of Representatives. Republicans maintained control of both state legislative chambers.

Kansas House of Representatives
Party	Before	After	Change
Republican	77	92	▲15
Democratic	48	33	▼15
Total	125	125	

=== Kentucky ===
Senate results

House of Representatives results

All of the seats of the Kentucky House of Representatives and half of the Kentucky Senate were up for election. Republicans maintained control of the Senate and Democrats maintained control of the House of Representatives.

Kentucky Senate
Party	Before	After	Change
Republican	20	22	▲2
Independent	1	1	Steady
Democratic	17	15	▼2
Total	38	38	

Kentucky House of Representatives
Party	Before	After	Change
Democratic	65	58	▼7
Republican	35	42	▲7
Total	100	100	

=== Maine ===
Senate results

All of the seats of the Maine Legislature were up for election. Republicans won control of both legislative chambers.

Maine Senate
Party	Before	After	Change
Republican	15	20	▲5
Democratic	20	14	▼6
Independent	0	1	▲1
Total	35	35	

Maine House of Representatives
Party	Before	After	Change
Republican	55	77	▲22
Democratic	95	73	▼22
Independent	1	1	Steady
Total	151	151	

=== Maryland ===
Senate results

House of Delegates results, simplifying multi-member districts

All of the seats of the Maryland Legislature were up for election. Democrats maintained control of both state legislative chambers.

Maryland Senate
Party	Before	After	Change
Democratic	33	35	▲2
Republican	14	12	▼2
Total	47	47	

Maryland House of Delegates
Party	Before	After	Change
Democratic	104	98	▼6
Republican	37	43	▲6
Total	141	141	

=== Massachusetts ===
Senate results

All of the seats of the Massachusetts Legislature were up for election. Democrats maintained control of both state legislative chambers.

Massachusetts Senate
Party	Before	After	Change
Democratic	35	36	▲1
Republican	5	4	▼1
Total	40	40	

Massachusetts House of Representatives
Party	Before	After	Change
Democratic	144	130	▼14
Republican	15	30	▲15
Independent	1	0	▼1
Total	160	160	

=== Michigan ===
Senate results

House of Representatives results

All of the seats of the Michigan Legislature were up for election. Republicans made large gains in both chambers, flipping control of the House and expanding their majority in the Senate.

Michigan Senate
Party	Before	After	Change
Republican	22	26	▲4
Democratic	16	12	▼4
Total	38	38	

Michigan House of Representatives
Party	Before	After	Change
Republican	43	63	▲20
Democratic	67	47	▼20
Total	110	110	

=== Minnesota ===
Senate results by vote share

House of Representatives results

All of the seats of the Minnesota Legislature were up. Republicans won control of both chambers.

Minnesota Senate
Party	Before	After	Change
Republican	21	37	▲16
Democratic (DFL)	46	30	▼16
Total	67	67	

Minnesota House of Representatives
Party	Before	After	Change
Republican	47	72	▲25
Democratic (DFL)	87	62	▼25
Total	134	134	

=== Missouri ===
Senate results

House of Representatives results

All of the seats of the Missouri House of Representatives and half of the Missouri Senate were up for election. Republicans maintained control of both state legislative chambers.

Missouri Senate
Party	Before	After	Change
Republican	23	26	▲3
Democratic	11	8	▼3
Total	34	34	

Missouri House of Representatives
Party	Before	After	Change
Republican	89	106	▲17
Democratic	74	57	▼17
Total	163	163	

=== Montana ===
House of Representatives results

All of the seats of the Montana House of Representatives and half of the Montana Senate were up for election. Republicans won control of the House and maintained control of the Senate.

Montana Senate
Party	Before	After	Change
Republican	27	28	▲1
Democratic	23	22	▼1
Total	50	50	

Montana House of Representatives
Party	Before	After	Change
Republican	50	68	▲18
Democratic	50 (Note: The Democratic Party controlled the chamber by virtue of holding the governor's office.)	32	▼18
Total	100	100	

=== Nebraska ===
Legislative results

Nebraska is the only U.S. state with a unicameral legislature; half of the seats of the Nebraska Legislature were up for election. Nebraska is also unique in that its legislature is officially non-partisan and holds non-partisan elections, although the Democratic and Republican parties each endorse legislative candidates. Republicans maintained control, gaining one seat through election, as well as an additional seat with the appointment of Dave Bloomfield to replace Democrat Robert Giese, who resigned.

Nebraska Legislature
Party	Before	After	Change
Republican	30	31	▲1
Democratic	19	18	▼1
Total	49	49	

=== Nevada ===
Senate results

All of the seats of the Nevada House of Representatives and half of the Nevada Senate were up for election. Democrats maintained control of both state legislative chambers.

Nevada Senate
Party	Before	After	Change
Democratic	12	11	▼1
Republican	9	10	▲1
Total	21	21	

Nevada Assembly
Party	Before	After	Change
Democratic	28	26	▼2
Republican	14	16	▲2
Total	42	42	

=== New Hampshire ===
Senate results

All of the seats of the New Hampshire House of Representatives and the New Hampshire Senate were up for election. Republicans won control of both legislative chambers.

New Hampshire Senate
Party	Before	After	Change
Republican	10	19	▲9
Democratic	14	5	▼9
Total	24	24	

New Hampshire House of Representatives
Party	Before	After	Change
Republican	176	298	▲122
Democratic	224	102	▼122
Total	400	400	

=== New Mexico ===
House of Representatives results

All of the seats of the New Mexico House of Representatives. Democrats maintained control of the chamber.

New Mexico House of Representatives
Party	Before	After	Change
Democratic	45	37	▼8
Republican	25	33	▲8
Total	70	70	

=== New York ===
Senate results

House of Representatives results

All of the seats of the New York Legislature were up for election. Republicans won control of the Senate, and Democrats maintained control of the Assembly.

New York State Senate
Party	Before	After	Change
Republican	30	32	▲2
Democratic	32	30	▼2
Total	62	62	

New York State Assembly
Party	Before	After	Change
Democratic	107	99	▼8
Republican	41	50	▲9
Independence	1	1	Steady
Working Families	1	0	▼1
Total	150	150	

=== North Carolina ===
Senate results

House of Representatives results

All of the seats of the North Carolina House of Representatives and half of the North Carolina Senate were up for election. Republicans made massive gains, flipping control of both state legislative chambers, winning them both simultaneously for the first time in over a century.

North Carolina Senate
Party	Before	After	Change
Republican	20	31	▲11
Democratic	30	19	▼11
Total	50	50	

North Carolina House of Representatives
Party	Before	After	Change
Republican	52	67	▲15
Independent	0	1	▲1
Democratic	68	52	▼16
Total	120	120	

=== North Dakota ===
Senate results

All of the seats of the North Dakota House of Representatives and half of the North Dakota Senate were up for election. Republicans maintained control of both state legislative chambers.

North Dakota Senate
Party	Before	After	Change
Republican	26	35	▲9
Democratic-NPL	21	12	▼9
Total	47	47	

North Dakota House of Representatives
Party	Before	After	Change
Republican	58	69	▲11
Democratic-NPL	36	25	▼11
Total	94	94	

=== Ohio ===
Senate results

All of the seats of the Ohio House of Representatives and half of the Ohio Senate were up for election. Republicans won control of the House of Representatives and maintained control of the Senate.

Ohio Senate
Party	Before	After	Change
Republican	21	23	▲2
Democratic	12	10	▼2
Total	33	33	

Ohio House of Representatives
Party	Before	After	Change
Republican	46	59	▲13
Democratic	53	40	▼13
Total	99	99	

=== Oklahoma ===
Senate results

All of the seats of the Oklahoma House of Representatives and half of the Oklahoma Senate were up for election. Republicans maintained control of both state legislative chambers.

Oklahoma Senate
Party	Before	After	Change
Republican	26	32	▲6
Democratic	22	16	▼6
Total	48	48	

Oklahoma House of Representatives
Party	Before	After	Change
Republican	62	70	▲8
Democratic	39	31	▼8
Total	101	101	

=== Oregon ===
Senate results

House of Representatives results

All of the seats of the Oregon House of Representatives and half of the Oregon Senate were up for election. Democrats maintained control of the Senate, and the House of Representatives became tied.

Oregon State Senate
Party	Before	After	Change
Democratic	18	16	▼2
Republican	12	14	▲2
Total	30	30	

Oregon House of Representatives
Party	Before	After	Change
Democratic	36	30	▼6
Republican	24	30	▲6
Total	60	60	

=== Pennsylvania ===
Senate results

House of Representatives results

All of the seats of the Pennsylvania House of Representatives and half of the Pennsylvania Senate were up for election. Republicans maintained control of the Senate and won control of the House of Representatives.

Pennsylvania State Senate
Party	Before	After	Change
Republican	30	30	Steady
Democratic	20	20	Steady
Total	50	50	

Pennsylvania House of Representatives
Party	Before	After	Change
Republican	99	112	▲13
Democratic	104	91	▼13
Total	203	203	

=== Rhode Island ===
Senate results

All of the seats of the Rhode Island Legislature were up for election. Democrats maintained control of both state legislative chambers.

Rhode Island Senate
Party	Before	After	Change
Democratic	33	29	▼4
Republican	4	8	▲4
Independent	1	1	Steady
Total	38	38	

Rhode Island House of Representatives
Party	Before	After	Change
Democratic	69	65	▼4
Republican	6	10	▲4
Total	75	75	

=== South Carolina ===
House of Representatives results

All of the seats of the South Carolina House of Representatives were up for election. Republicans maintained control of both state legislative chambers.

South Carolina House of Representatives
Party	Before	After	Change
Republican	73	76	▲3
Democratic	51	48	▼3
Total	124	124	

=== South Dakota ===
All of the seats of the South Dakota Legislature were up for election. Republicans maintained control of both state legislative chambers.

South Dakota Senate
Party	Before	After	Change
Republican	21	29	▲8
Democratic	14	6	▼8
Total	35	35	

South Dakota House of Representatives
Party	Before	After	Change
Republican	46	50	▲4
Democratic	24	19	▼5
Independent	0	1	▲1
Total	70	70	

=== Tennessee ===
Senate results

House of Representatives results

All of the seats of the Tennessee House of Representatives and half of the Tennessee Senate were up for election. After having narrowly won control of both chambers in the 2008 election, Republicans greatly expanded their majority in the House and picked up one seat in the Senate.

Tennessee Senate
Party	Before	After	Change
Republican	19	20	▲1
Democratic	14	13	▼1
Total	33	33	

Tennessee House of Representatives
Party	Before	After	Change
Republican	50	64	▲14
Democratic	48	34	▼14
Independent Republican	1	1	Steady
Total	99	99	

=== Texas ===
Senate results

House of Representatives results

All of the seats of the Texas House of Representatives and half of the Texas Senate were up for election. After having nearly lost control of the Texas House in 2008, Republicans routed the Democrats, flipping 22 seats. Republicans erased all of the gains Democrats had made in 2006 and 2008, and they defeated almost every Democrat representing a rural, Republican-leaning district.

Texas Senate
Party	Before	After	Change
Republican	19	19	Steady
Democratic	12	12	Steady
Total	31	31	

Texas House of Representatives
Party	Before	After	Change
Republican	77	99	▲22
Democratic	73	51	▼22
Total	150	150	

=== Utah ===
Senate results

All of the seats of the Utah House of Representatives and half of the Utah Senate were up for election. Republicans maintained control of both state legislative chambers.

Utah State Senate
Party	Before	After	Change
Republican	21	22	▲1
Democratic	8	7	▼1
Total	29	29	

Utah House of Representatives
Party	Before	After	Change
Republican	53	58	▲5
Democratic	22	17	▼5
Total	75	75	

=== Vermont ===
Senate results

All of the seats of the Vermont Legislature were up for election. Democrats maintained control of both state legislative chambers.

Vermont Senate
Party	Before	After	Change
Democratic	23	21	▼2
Republican	7	8	▲1
Progressive	0	1	▲1
Total	30	30	

Vermont House of Representatives
Party	Before	After	Change
Democratic	94	94	Steady
Republican	48	48	Steady
Progressive	5	5	Steady
Independent	3	3	Steady
Total	150	150	

=== Washington ===
Senate results

House of Representatives results

All of the seats of the Washington House of Representatives and half of the Washington Senate were up for election. Democrats maintained control of both legislative chambers.

Washington State Senate
Party	Before	After	Change
Democratic	31	27	▼4
Republican	18	22	▲4
Total	49	49	

Washington House of Representatives
Party	Before	After	Change
Democratic	61	56	▼5
Republican	37	42	▲5
Total	98	98	

=== West Virginia ===
Senate results

House of Delegates results

All of the seats of the West Virginia House of Delegates and half of the West Virginia Senate were up for election. Democrats maintained control of both state legislative chambers.

West Virginia Senate
Party	Before	After	Change
Democratic	26	28	▲2
Republican	8	6	▼2
Total	34	34	

West Virginia House of Delegates
Party	Before	After	Change
Democratic	71	65	▼6
Republican	29	35	▲6
Total	100	100	

=== Wisconsin ===
Senate results

State Assembly results

All of the seats of the Wisconsin Assembly and half of the Wisconsin Senate were up for election. Republicans flipped control of both state legislative chambers, as well as the governorship, winning complete control of state government for the first time since 1998.

Wisconsin Senate
Party	Before	After	Change
Republican	15	19	▲4
Democratic	18	14	▼4
Total	33	33	

Wisconsin State Assembly
Party	Before	After	Change
Republican	46	60	▲14
Democratic	51	38	▼13
Independent	2	1	▼1
Total	99	99	

=== Wyoming ===
Senate results by vote share

All of the seats of the Wyoming House of Representatives and half of the Wyoming Senate were up for election. Republicans maintained control of both state legislative chambers.

Wyoming Senate
Party	Before	After	Change
Republican	23	26	▲3
Democratic	7	4	▼3
Total	30	30	

Wyoming House of Representatives
Party	Before	After	Change
Republican	41	50	▲9
Democratic	19	10	▼9
Total	60	60	

== Territorial and federal district summaries ==
=== American Samoa ===
All of the seats of the American Samoa Senate and the American Samoa House of Representatives were up for election. Members of the Senate serve four-year terms, while members of the House of Representatives serve two-year terms. Gubernatorial and legislative elections are conducted on a nonpartisan basis in American Samoa.

=== Guam ===
Guam Legislature
Party	Before	After	Change
Democratic	9	9	Steady
Republican	6	6	Steady
Total	15	15	

=== U.S. Virgin Islands ===
Virgin Islands Legislature
Party	Before	After	Change
Democratic	10	10	Steady
Independent	5	5	Steady
Total	15	15	

=== Washington, D.C. ===
District of Columbia Council
Party	Before	After	Change
Democratic	11	11	Steady
Independent	2	2	Steady
Total	13	13	

== Special elections ==
=== New Jersey ===
District		Incumbent			This race	
Chamber	No.	Representative	Party	First elected	Results	Candidates
Senate	14	Tom Goodwin	Republican	2010 (appointed)	Incumbent lost election for remainder of the term New member elected November 2, 2010. Democratic Gain.	▌ ✓ Linda Greenstein (Democratic) 53.8%; ▌ Tom Goodwin (Republican) 46.2%
Assembly	31	Jason O'Donnell	Democratic	2010 (appointed)	Incumbent appointed and elected to remainder of the term on November 2, 2010. Democratic hold.	▌ ✓ Jason O'Donnell (Democratic) 65.8%; ▌ Joseph Turula (Republican) 17.4%
