= Georgia's 36th Senate district =

American legislative district

Georgia's 36th State Senate district
Senator
| Nan Orrock; D–Atlanta |
- Demographics: 33.10% White; 51.35% Black; 7.56% Hispanic; 3.58% Asian; 0.17% Native American; 0.04% Hawaiian/Pacific Islander; 0.53% Other; 4.38% Multiracial
- Population (2020) • Voting age: 192,282; 161,385

District 36 of the Georgia Senate is in Metro Atlanta.

The district is contained entirely within Fulton County. It includes the central and southeastern part of the City of Atlanta as well as parts of College Park, East Point, and Hapeville. In Atlanta, the district includes all of Downtown and much of Midtown, as well as the neighborhoods of Cabbagetown, Capitol View, East Atlanta, Grant Park, Inman Park, Lakewood Heights, Mechanicsville, Peoplestown, Pittsburgh, Sweet Auburn, Sylvan Hills, Thomasville, Vine City, Virginia-Highland, and West End. The district includes the Martin Luther King Jr., National Historical Park and Piedmont Park.

The current senator is Nan Orrock, a Democrat from Atlanta first elected in 2006.

== District officeholders ==
| Years | Senator | Counties in district |
|---|---|---|
| 2001–2002 | David Scott (D) | – |
| 2003–2004 | Sam Zamarripa (D) | Fulton (Atlanta (county seat), East Point) |
| 2005–2006 | Sam Zamarripa (D) | Fulton (Atlanta (county seat), East Point) |
| 2007–2008 | Nan Orrock (D) | Fulton (Atlanta (county seat), East Point) |
| 2009–2010 | Nan Orrock (D) | Fulton (Atlanta (county seat), East Point) |
| 2011–2012 | Nan Orrock (D) | Fulton (Atlanta (county seat), East Point) |
| 2013–2014 | Nan Orrock (D) | (Note: A map is provided on the Georgia Senate website showing the district coverage as of 2013.) |
| 2015–2016 | Nan Orrock (D) | (Note: A map is provided on the Georgia Senate website showing the district coverage as of 2013.) |
| 2017–2018 | Nan Orrock (D) | (Note: A map is provided on the Georgia Senate website showing the district coverage as of 2013.) |
| 2019–2020 | Nan Orrock (D) | (Note: A map is provided on the Georgia Senate website showing the district coverage as of 2013.) |
