= 2001 United States state legislative elections =

- November 6, 2001

3 legislative chambers in 2 states
	Majority party	Minority party	Third party
Party	Republican	Democratic	Coalition
Chambers before	50 (Note: The Washington House of Representatives and Maine Senate were tied, and they were controlled by a power-sharing agreement between Democrats and Republicans. They are not counted towards either total here.)	46	1 (Note: The Arizona Senate was controlled by a coalition of Democrats and Republicans. The minority caucus consists of Republicans who were not part of the majority coalition.)
Chambers after	48 (Note: The New Jersey Senate became tied. The Maine Senate remained tied, and they were controlled by a power-sharing agreement between Democrats and Republicans. They are not counted towards either total here.)	48	1
Overall change	▼2	▲2	Steady
- Map of upper house elections: Split body formed No regularly-scheduled elections

- Map of lower house elections: Democrats gained control Republicans retained control No regularly-scheduled elections

The 2001 United States state legislative elections were held on November 6, 2001, during President George W. Bush's first term in office. Elections were held for three legislative chambers in two states, simultaneous to those states' gubernatorial elections. Both chambers of the Northern Mariana Islands legislature were up as well.

These were the first elections affected by the 2000 redistricting cycle, which reapportioned state legislatures based on data from the 2000 United States census.

Republicans maintained control of the lower house of the Virginia General Assembly, while Democrats won control of the New Jersey General Assembly, and evenly split the State Senate. Democrats additionally won control of the Washington House of Representatives through special elections.

== Summary table ==
Regularly scheduled elections were held in 3 of the 99 state legislative chambers in the United States. Nationwide, regularly scheduled elections were held for 220 of the 7,383 legislative seats. This table only covers regularly scheduled elections; additional special elections took place concurrently with these regularly scheduled elections.

State	Upper House				Lower House			
State	Seats up	Total	% up	Term	Seats up	Total	% up	Term
New Jersey	40	40	100	2/4 (Note: The upper houses of Arkansas, Delaware, Florida, Hawaii, Illinois, Minnesota, New Jersey, and Texas use a 2-4-4 term length system.)	80	80	100	2
Virginia	0	0	0	4	100	100	100	2

== State summaries ==
=== New Jersey ===
All seats of the New Jersey Senate and the New Jersey General Assembly were up for election. In 2001, senators were elected to two-year terms in single-member districts, while Assembly members were elected to two-year terms in two-member districts. Democrats won control of the General Assembly and created a split body in the Senate.

New Jersey Senate
Party	Before	After	Change
Democratic	16	20	▲4
Republican	24	20	▼4
Total		40	40

New Jersey General Assembly
Party	Before	After	Change
Democratic	35	44	▲9
Republican	45	36	▼9
Total		80	80

=== Virginia ===
All seats of the Virginia House of Delegates were up for election in 2001. The delegates serve terms of two years. Republicans held the House of Delegates.

Virginia House of Delegates
Party	Before	After	Change
Democratic	47	34	▼13
Republican	52	64	▲12
Independent	1	2	▲1
Total		100	100

== Territorial and federal district summaries ==
=== Northern Mariana Islands ===
All seats of the Northern Mariana Islands House of Representatives and half of the Northern Mariana Islands Senate are up for election. Senators are elected to four-year terms and Representatives are elected to two-year terms.

Senate
Party	Before	After	Change
Republican	6	4	▼2
Democratic	2	3	▲1
Total	9	9	

House of Representatives
Party	Before	After	Change
Republican	11	16	▲5
Democratic	6	1	▼5
Total	18	18	
