= Georgia's 28th Senate district =

State district of Georgia, US

Georgia's 28th State Senate district
Senator
Donzella James; D–Atlanta
- Demographics: 25.25% White; 54.08% Black; 14.25% Hispanic; 1.86% Asian; 0.19% Native American; 0.06% Hawaiian/Pacific Islander; 0.68% Other; 4.80% Multiracial
- Population (2020) • Voting age: 191,223; 144,565

District 28 of the Georgia Senate is located in western Metro Atlanta.

The district includes southern Cobb, eastern Douglas, and southwestern Fulton counties. It includes parts of Austell, Chattahoochee Hills, Douglasville, Lithia Springs, Mableton, Powder Springs, Smyrna, and South Fulton. While it does not include any of the City of Atlanta, some parts of the district have an Atlanta mailing address.

The current senator is Donzella James, a Democrat from Atlanta first elected in a special election in 2009. She previously served in the Georgia Senate from 1995 to 2002.
