= 2008 United States state legislative elections =

- November 4, 2008

85 legislative chambers in 44 states
	Majority party	Minority party	Third party
Party	Democratic	Republican	Coalition
Chambers before	58	39 (Note: Following the defection of Senator Micheal R. Williams from the Republican party, no party controlled the Tennessee Senate. Thus the chamber is not included in the total here.)	1 (Note: The Alaska Senate was controlled by a coalition of Democrats and Republicans. The minority caucus consists of Republicans who were not part of the majority coalition.)
Chambers after	61	37	1
Overall change	▲3	▼2	Steady
- Map of upper house elections: Democrats gained control Democrats retained control Republicans gained control Republicans retained control Coalition retained control Non-partisan legislature No regularly-scheduled elections

- Map of lower house elections: Democrats gained control Democrats retained control Republicans gained control Republicans retained control Non-partisan legislature No regularly-scheduled elections

Elections to state legislatures were held on November 4, 2008, alongside other elections, in which Democrats scored significant gains in a blue wave election. Elections were held for 85 legislative chambers, with all states but Louisiana, Mississippi, New Jersey, Alabama, Maryland, and Virginia holding elections in at least one house. Michigan and Minnesota held elections for their lower, but not upper houses. Seven territorial chambers in four territories and the District of Columbia were up.

The New Hampshire Senate saw the election of the first-ever female majority. This is the first time this has occurred in any chamber of any state legislature in United States history. In New York, the Democrats obtained a trifecta for the first time since 1935, and in Delaware for the first time since 1977.

The Democrats took control of six legislative bodies to the Republicans' four. Democrats took control of the Delaware House of Representatives, for the first time since 1985, the Montana House of Representatives, the Nevada Senate, and the New York State Senate, for the first time since 1966, the Ohio House of Representatives, and the Wisconsin State Assembly. Republicans took control of the Montana Senate; both houses of the Tennessee General Assembly, for the first time since 1870; and the Oklahoma Senate, for the first time in state history.

With the Montana Senate and the Montana House of Representatives flipping, this election cycle marked the last time in U.S. history as of 2026 where the upper house and lower house, held by different political parties in a state legislature, both flipped in the same cycle.

== Summary table ==
Regularly scheduled elections were held in 85 of the 99 state legislative chambers in the United States. Nationwide, regularly scheduled elections were held for 5,948 of the 7,383 legislative seats. Many legislative chambers held elections for all seats, but some legislative chambers that use staggered elections held elections for only a portion of the total seats in the chamber. The chambers not up for election either hold regularly scheduled elections in odd-numbered years, or have four-year terms and hold all regularly scheduled elections in presidential midterm election years.

Note that this table only covers regularly scheduled elections; additional special elections took place concurrently with these regularly scheduled elections.

State	Upper House				Lower House			
State	Seats up	Total	% up	Term	Seats up	Total	% up	Term
Alaska	19	20	95	4	40	40	100	2
Arizona	30	30	100	2	60	60	100	2
Arkansas	35	35	100	2/4 (Note: The upper houses of Arkansas, Delaware, Florida, Hawaii, Illinois, Minnesota, New Jersey, and Texas use a 2-4-4 term length system.)	100	100	100	2
California	20	40	50	4	80	80	100	2
Colorado	18	35	51	4	65	65	100	2
Connecticut	36	36	100	2	151	151	100	2
Delaware	21	21	100	2/4	41	41	100	2
Florida	40	40	100	2/4	120	120	100	2
Georgia	56	56	100	2	180	180	100	2
Hawaii	25	25	100	2/4	51	51	100	2
Idaho	35	35	100	2	70	70	100	2
Illinois	59	59	100	2/4	118	118	100	2
Indiana	25	50	50	4	100	100	100	2
Iowa	25	50	50	4	100	100	100	2
Kansas	40	40	100	4	125	125	100	2
Kentucky	19	38	50	4	100	100	100	2
Louisiana	0	39	0	4	0	105	0	4
Maine	35	35	100	2	151	151	100	2
Maryland	0	47	0	4	0	141	0	4
Massachusetts	40	40	100	2	160	160	100	2
Michigan	0	38	0	4	110	110	100	2
Minnesota	0	0	100	2/4	134	134	100	2
Mississippi	0	52	0	4	0	122	0	4
Missouri	17	34	50	4	163	163	100	2
Montana	25	50	50	4	100	100	100	2
Nebraska	25 (Note: These figures represent the seats of Nebraska's unicameral legislature.)	49	51	4	N/A (unicameral)			
Nevada	10	21	48	4	42	42	100	2
New Hampshire	24	24	100	2	400	400	100	2
New Jersey	0	40	0	2/4	0	80	0	2
New Mexico	42	42	100	4	70	70	100	2
New York	62	62	100	2	150	150	100	2
North Carolina	50	50	100	2	120	120	100	2
North Dakota	23	47	49	4	47	94	50	4
Ohio	16	33	48	4	99	99	100	2
Oklahoma	24	48	50	4	101	101	100	2
Oregon	15	30	50	4	60	60	100	2
Pennsylvania	25	50	50	4	203	203	100	2
Rhode Island	38	38	100	2	75	75	100	2
South Carolina	46	46	100	4	124	124	100	2
South Dakota	35	35	100	2	70	70	100	2
Tennessee	16	33	48	4	99	99	100	2
Texas	16	31	52	2/4	150	150	100	2
Utah	15	29	52	4	75	75	100	2
Vermont	30	30	100	2	150	150	100	2
Virginia	0	40	0	4	0	100	0	2
Washington	25	49	51	4	98	98	100	2
West Virginia	17	34	50	4	100	100	100	2
Wisconsin	16	33	48	4	99	99	100	2
Wyoming	15	30	50	4	60	60	100	2
Total	1280	1971	65	N/A	4595	5411	85	N/A

== Electoral predictions ==
Analysts expected Democrats to perform quite well, owing to the strong polling of Democrat Barack Obama in the concurrent presidential election. Despite this, they expected Democrats to only be able to pick up a net handful of chambers from the Republicans owing to the highs they had already reached during the 2006 elections. They saw Democrats' best pickup opportunities in chambers in midwestern presidential battleground states such as the Wisconsin State Assembly and the Ohio House of Representatives, as well as Republican-held chambers in strongly-Democratic states, such as the Delaware House of Representatives and the New York State Senate. Despite Obama's large polling lead, Republicans were expected to be able to win a few chambers in southern states where his potential coattails were seen as weaker in rural areas, such as the Oklahoma Senate and the Tennessee Senate.

Ratings are designated as follows:

- "Tossup": Competitive, no advantage
- "Lean": Competitive, slight advantage
- "Likely": Not competitive, but opposition could make significant gains
- "Safe": Not competitive at all

State	Chamber	Last election	Stateline Oct. 15, 2008	Result
Alaska	Senate	Coal. 15–5	Tossup	Coal. 16–4
Alaska	House of Representatives	R 23–17	Likely R	R 22–18
Arizona	Senate	R 17–13	Lean R	R 18–12
Arizona	House of Representatives	R 33–27	Tossup	R 35–25
Arkansas	Senate	D 27–8	Safe D	D 27–8
Arkansas	House of Representatives	D 72–28	Safe D	D 71–28–1
California	State Senate	D 25–15	Safe D	D 25–15
California	State Assembly	D 48–32	Safe D	D 51–29
Colorado	Senate	D 20–15	Lean D	D 21–14
Colorado	House of Representatives	D 39–26	Likely D	D 38–27
Connecticut	State Senate	D 24–12	Safe D	D 24–12
Connecticut	House of Representatives	D 107–44	Safe D	D 114–37
Delaware	Senate	D 13–8	Safe D	D 16–5
Delaware	House of Representatives	R 23–18	Lean D (flip)	D 24–17
Florida	Senate	R 26–14	Safe R	R 26–14
Florida	House of Representatives	R 78–42	Safe R	R 76–44
Georgia	State Senate	R 34–22	Safe R	R 34–22
Georgia	House of Representatives	R 106–74	Safe R	R 105–74–1
Hawaii	Senate	D 20–5	Safe D	D 23–2
Hawaii	House of Representatives	D 43–8	Safe D	D 45–6
Idaho	Senate	R 28–7	Safe R	R 28–7
Idaho	House of Representatives	R 51–19	Safe R	R 52–18
Illinois	Senate	D 37–22	Likely D	D 37–22
Illinois	House of Representatives	D 66–52	Likely D	D 70–48
Indiana	Senate	R 33–17	Safe R	R 33–17
Indiana	House of Representatives	D 51–49	Tossup	D 52–48
Iowa	Senate	D 30–20	Likely D	D 32–18
Iowa	House of Representatives	D 54–46	Likely D	D 57–43
Kansas	Senate	R 30–10	Safe R	R 31–9
Kansas	House of Representatives	R 78–47	Safe R	R 77–48
Kentucky	Senate	R 21–16–1	Likely R	R 22–15–1
Kentucky	House of Representatives	D 61–39	Safe D	D 65–35
Maine	Senate	D 18–17	Tossup	D 20–15
Maine	House of Representatives	D 90–59–2	Safe D	D 95–55–1
Massachusetts	Senate	D 35–5	Safe D	D 35–5
Massachusetts	House of Representatives	D 141–19	Safe D	D 144–15–1
Michigan	House of Representatives	D 58–52	Lean D	D 67–43
Minnesota	House of Representatives	D 85–49	Safe D	D 87–47
Missouri	Senate	R 21–13	Likely R	R 23–11
Missouri	House of Representatives	R 92–71	Likely R	R 89–74
Montana	Senate	D 26–24 (Note: Includes a post-election party switch by Senator Sam Kitzenberg which gave Democrats control of the chamber.)	Lean R (flip)	R 27–23
Montana	House of Representatives	R 50–49–1	Tossup	D 50–50
Nevada	Senate	R 11–10	Tossup	D 12–9
Nevada	Assembly	D 27–15	Safe D	D 28–14
New Hampshire	Senate	D 14–10	Tossup	D 14–10
New Hampshire	House of Representatives	D 239–160–1	Lean D	D 225–175
New Mexico	Senate	D 24–18	Safe D	D 27–15
New Mexico	House of Representatives	D 42–28	Safe D	D 45–25
New York	State Senate	R 33–29	Lean D (flip)	D 32–30
New York	State Assembly	D 106–42–1–1	Safe D	D 107–41–1–1
North Carolina	Senate	D 31–19	Lean D	D 30–20
North Carolina	House of Representatives	D 68–52	Likely D	D 68–52
North Dakota	Senate	R 26–21	Tossup	R 26–21
North Dakota	House of Representatives	R 61–33	Likely R	R 58–36
Ohio	Senate	R 21–12	Likely R	R 21–12
Ohio	House of Representatives	R 53–46	Tossup	D 53–46
Oklahoma	Senate	D 24–24	Lean R (flip)	R 26–22
Oklahoma	House of Representatives	R 57–44	Likely R	R 61–40
Oregon	State Senate	D 19–11	Safe D	D 18–12
Oregon	House of Representatives	D 31–29	Likely D	D 36–24
Pennsylvania	State Senate	R 29–21	Safe R	R 30–20
Pennsylvania	House of Representatives	D 102–101	Tossup	D 104–99
Rhode Island	Senate	D 33–5	Safe D	D 33–4–1
Rhode Island	House of Representatives	D 60–15	Safe D	D 69–6
South Carolina	Senate	R 26–20	Safe R	R 27–19
South Carolina	House of Representatives	R 73–51	Safe R	R 73–51
South Dakota	Senate	R 20–15	Lean R	R 21–14
South Dakota	House of Representatives	R 50–20	Safe R	R 46–24
Tennessee	Senate	16–16–1 (Note: Includes a 2007 party switch by a Republican Senator that deadlocked the chamber.)	Lean R (flip)	R 19–14
Tennessee	House of Representatives	D 53–46	Lean D	R 50–49
Texas	Senate	R 20–11	Safe R	R 19–12
Texas	House of Representatives	R 81–69	Lean R	R 76–74
Utah	State Senate	R 21–8	Safe R	R 21–8
Utah	House of Representatives	R 55–20	Safe R	R 53–22
Vermont	Senate	D 23–7	Safe D	D 23–7
Vermont	House of Representatives	D 93–49–6–2	Safe D	D 94–48–5–3
Washington	State Senate	D 32–17	Safe D	D 31–18
Washington	House of Representatives	D 62–36	Safe D	D 62–36
West Virginia	Senate	D 23–11	Safe D	D 26–8
West Virginia	House of Delegates	D 72–28	Safe D	D 71–29
Wisconsin	Senate	D 18–15	Lean D	D 18–15
Wisconsin	State Assembly	R 52–47	Tossup	D 52–46–1
Wyoming	Senate	R 23–7	Safe R	R 23–7
Wyoming	House of Representatives	R 43–17	Safe R	R 41–19

== Maps ==
Partisan control of state governments after the 2008 elections:
Democrats maintained trifecta
Democrats gained trifecta
Republicans maintained trifecta
Divided government maintained
Divided government established
Officially non-partisan legislature

Upper house seats by party holding majority in each state
Democratic 50–60% 60–70% 70–80% 80–90% 90–100%	Republican 50–60% 60–70% 70–80% 80–90%	Tie 50%

Lower house seats by party holding majority in each state
Democratic 50–60% 60–70% 70–80% 80–90% 90–100%	Republican 50–60% 60–70% 70–80%	Tie 50%

Net changes to upper house seats after the 2008 elections
+1 Dem seat +2 Dem seats +3 Dem seats
+1 Rep seat +2 Rep seats +3 Rep seats
+1 Ind seat

Net changes to lower house seats after the 2008 elections
+1 Dem seat +2 Dem seats +3–5 Dem seats +6–9 Dem seats
+1 Rep seat +2 Rep seats +4 Rep seats +15 Rep seats
+1 Ind seat +1 Green seat

== State summaries ==
=== Alaska ===
All of the seats of the Alaska House of Representatives and half of the Alaska Senate were up for election. The Democratic-led coalition maintained control of the Senate while Republicans maintained control of the House.

Alaska Senate
Party	Before	After	Change
Democratic	9	10	▲1
Republican	6	6	▼1
Republican	5	4	▼1
Total	20	20	

Alaska House of Representatives
Party	Before	After	Change
Republican	23	22	▼1
Democratic	17	18	▲1
Total	40	40	

=== Arizona ===
All of the seats of the Arizona Legislature were up for election. Republicans maintained control of both state legislative chambers.

Arizona Senate
Party	Before	After	Change
Republican	17	18	▲1
Democratic	13	12	▼1
Total	30	30	

Arizona House of Representatives
Party	Before	After	Change
Republican	33	35	▲2
Democratic	27	25	▼2
Total	60	60	

=== Arkansas ===
All of the seats of the Arkansas House of Representatives and half of the Arkansas Senate were up for election. Democrats maintained control of both state legislative chambers.

Arkansas Senate
Party	Before	After	Change
Democratic	27	27	Steady
Republican	8	8	Steady
Total	35	35	

Arkansas House of Representatives
Party	Before	After	Change
Democratic	72	71	▼1
Republican	28	28	Steady
Green	0	1	▲1
Total	100	100	

=== California ===
All of the seats of the California House of Representatives and half of the California Senate were up for election. Democrats maintained control of both state legislative chambers.

California State Senate
Party	Before	After	Change
Democratic	25	25	Steady
Republican	15	15	Steady
Total	40	40	

California State Assembly
Party	Before	After	Change
Democratic	48	51	▲3
Republican	32	29	▼3
Total	80	80	

=== Colorado ===
All of the seats of the Colorado House of Representatives and half of the Colorado Senate were up for election. Democrats maintained control of both state legislative chambers.

Colorado Senate
Party	Before	After	Change
Democratic	20	21	▲1
Republican	15	14	▼1
Total	35	35	

Colorado House of Representatives
Party	Before	After	Change
Democratic	39	38	▼1
Republican	26	27	▲1
Total	65	65	

=== Connecticut ===
All of the seats of the Connecticut Legislature were up for election. Democrats maintained control of both state legislative chambers.

Connecticut State Senate
Party	Before	After	Change
Democratic	23	24	▲1
Republican	13	12	▼1
Total	36	36	

Connecticut House of Representatives
Party	Before	After	Change
Democratic	107	114	▲7
Republican	44	37	▼7
Total	151	151	

=== Delaware ===
All of the seats of the Delaware House of Representatives and half of the Delaware Senate were up for election. Democrats maintained control of the Senate and won control of the House.

Delaware Senate
Party	Before	After	Change
Democratic	13	16	▲3
Republican	8	5	▼3
Total	21	21	

Delaware House of Representatives
Party	Before	After	Change
Democratic	19	25	▲6
Republican	22	16	▼6
Total	41	41	

=== Florida ===
All of the seats of the Florida House of Representatives and half of the Florida Senate were up for election. Republicans maintained control of both state legislative chambers.

Florida Senate
Party	Before	After	Change
Republican	26	26	Steady
Democratic	14	14	Steady
Total	40	40	

Florida House of Representatives
Party	Before	After	Change
Republican	77	76	▼1
Democratic	43	44	▲1
Total	120	120	

=== Georgia ===
All of the seats of the Georgia Legislature were up for election. Republicans maintained control of both state legislative chambers.

Georgia State Senate
Party	Before	After	Change
Republican	34	34	Steady
Democratic	22	22	Steady
Total	56	56	

Georgia House of Representatives
Party	Before	After	Change
Republican	106	105	▼1
Democratic	74	75	▲1
Total	180	180	

=== Hawaii ===
All of the seats of the Hawaii House of Representatives and half of the Hawaii Senate were up for election. Democrats maintained control of both state legislative chambers.

Hawaii Senate
Party	Before	After	Change
Democratic	20	23	▲3
Republican	5	2	▼3
Total	25	25	

Hawaii House of Representatives
Party	Before	After	Change
Democratic	43	45	▲2
Republican	8	6	▼2
Total	51	51	

=== Idaho ===
All of the seats of the Idaho Legislature were up for election. Republicans maintained control of both state legislative chambers.

Idaho Senate
Party	Before	After	Change
Republican	28	28	Steady
Democratic	7	7	Steady
Total	35	35	

Idaho House of Representatives
Party	Before	After	Change
Republican	51	52	▲1
Democratic	19	18	▼1
Total	70	70	

=== Illinois ===
All of the seats of the Illinois House of Representatives and 2/3rds of the Illinois Senate were up for election. Democrats maintained control of both state legislative chambers.

Illinois Senate
Party	Before	After	Change
Democratic	37	37	Steady
Republican	22	22	Steady
Total	59	59	

Illinois House of Representatives
Party	Before	After	Change
Democratic	67	70	▲3
Republican	51	48	▼3
Total	118	118	

=== Indiana ===
All of the seats of the Indiana House of Representatives and half of the Indiana Senate were up for election. Republicans maintained control of the Senate while Democrats maintained control of the House of Representatives.

Indiana Senate
Party	Before	After	Change
Republican	33	33	Steady
Democratic	17	17	Steady
Total	50	50	

Indiana House of Representatives
Party	Before	After	Change
Democratic	51	52	▲1
Republican	49	48	▼1
Total	100	100	

=== Iowa ===
All of the seats of the Iowa House of Representatives and half of the Iowa Senate were up for election. Democrats maintained control of both state legislative chambers.

Iowa Senate
Party	Before	After	Change
Democratic	30	32	▲2
Republican	20	18	▼2
Total	50	50	

Iowa House of Representatives
Party	Before	After	Change
Democratic	54	57	▲3
Republican	46	43	▼3
Total	100	100	

=== Kansas ===
All of the seats of the Kansas Senate and Kansas House of Representatives were up for election. Republicans maintained control of both state legislative chambers.

Kansas Senate
Party	Before	After	Change
Republican	30	31	▲1
Democratic	10	9	▼1
Total	40	40	

Kansas House of Representatives
Party	Before	After	Change
Republican	78	77	▼1
Democratic	47	48	▲1
Total	125	125	

=== Kentucky ===
All of the seats of the Kentucky House of Representatives and half of the Kentucky Senate were up for election. Republicans maintained control of the Senate and Democrats maintained control of the House of Representatives.

Kentucky Senate
Party	Before	After	Change
Republican	22	22	Steady
Independent	1	1	Steady
Democratic	15	15	Steady
Total	38	38	

Kentucky House of Representatives
Party	Before	After	Change
Democratic	63	65	▲2
Republican	37	35	▼2
Total	100	100	

=== Maine ===
All of the seats of the Maine Legislature were up for election. Democrats maintained control of both state legislative chambers.

Maine Senate
Party	Before	After	Change
Democratic	18	20	▲2
Republican	17	15	▼2
Total	35	35	

Maine House of Representatives
Party	Before	After	Change
Democratic	90	95	▲5
Republican	59	55	▼4
Independent	2	1	▼1
Total	151	151	

=== Massachusetts ===
All of the seats of the Massachusetts Legislature were up for election. Democrats maintained control of both state legislative chambers.

Massachusetts Senate
Party	Before	After	Change
Democratic	35	35	Steady
Republican	5	5	Steady
Total	40	40	

Massachusetts House of Representatives
Party	Before	After	Change
Democratic	141	144	▲3
Republican	19	16	▼3
Independent	1	1	Steady
Total	160	160	

=== Michigan ===
All of the seats of the Michigan House of Representatives were up for election; Democrats maintained control.

Michigan House of Representatives
Party	Before	After	Change
Democratic	58	67	▲9
Republican	52	43	▼9
Total	110	110	

=== Minnesota ===
All of the seats of the Minnesota House of Representatives were up; Democrats maintained control.

Minnesota House of Representatives
Party	Before	After	Change
Democratic (DFL)	85	87	▲2
Republican	48	47	▼1
Independent Republican	1	0	▼1
Total	134	134	

=== Missouri ===
All of the seats of the Missouri House of Representatives and half of the Missouri Senate were up for election. Republicans maintained control of both state legislative chambers.

Missouri Senate
Party	Before	After	Change
Republican	21	23	▲2
Democratic	13	11	▼2
Total	34	34	

Missouri House of Representatives
Party	Before	After	Change
Republican	92	89	▼3
Democratic	71	74	▲3
Total	163	163	

=== Montana ===
All of the seats of the Montana House of Representatives and half of the Montana Senate were up for election. Republicans flipped control of the Senate and Democrats flipped control of the House.

Montana Senate
Party	Before	After	Change
Republican	24	27	▲3
Democratic	26	23	▼3
Total	50	50	

Montana House of Representatives
Party	Before	After	Change
Democratic	49	50 (Note: The Democratic Party controlled the chamber by virtue of holding the governor's office.)	▲1
Republican	50	50	Steady
Constitution	1	0	▼1
Total	100	100	

=== Nebraska ===
Nebraska is the only U.S. state with a unicameral legislature; half of the seats of the Nebraska Legislature were up for election. Nebraska is also unique in that its legislature is officially non-partisan and holds non-partisan elections, although the Democratic and Republican parties each endorse legislative candidates. Republicans maintained control.

Nebraska Legislature
Party	Before	After	Change
Republican	30	31	▲1
Democratic	17	18	▲1
Independent	2	0	▼2
Total	49	49	

=== Nevada ===
All of the seats of the Nevada House of Representatives and half of the Nevada Senate were up for election. Democrats maintained control of the House and won control of the Senate.

Nevada Senate
Party	Before	After	Change
Democratic	10	12	▲2
Republican	11	9	▼2
Total	21	21	

Nevada Assembly
Party	Before	After	Change
Democratic	27	28	▲1
Republican	15	14	▼1
Total	42	42	

=== New Hampshire ===
All of the seats of the New Hampshire House of Representatives and the New Hampshire Senate were up for election. Democrats maintained control of both legislative chambers.

New Hampshire Senate
Party	Before	After	Change
Democratic	14	14	Steady
Republican	10	10	Steady
Total	24	24	

New Hampshire House of Representatives
Party	Before	After	Change
Democratic	239	225	▼14
Republican	160	175	▲15
Independent	1	0	▼1
Total	400	400	

=== New Mexico ===
All of the seats of the New Mexico Senate and the New Mexico House of Representatives were up for election. Democrats maintained control of both chambers.

New Mexico Senate
Party	Before	After	Change
Democratic	24	27	▲3
Republican	18	15	▼3
Total	42	42	

New Mexico House of Representatives
Party	Before	After	Change
Democratic	42	45	▲3
Republican	28	25	▼3
Total	70	70	

=== New York ===
All of the seats of the New York Legislature were up for election. Democrats won control of the Senate and maintained control of the Assembly.

New York State Senate
Party	Before	After	Change
Democratic	30	32	▲2
Republican	32	30	▼2
Total	62	62	

New York State Assembly
Party	Before	After	Change
Democratic	106	107	▲1
Republican	42	41	▼1
Independence	1	1	Steady
Working Families	1	1	Steady
Total	150	150	

=== North Carolina ===
All of the seats of the North Carolina House of Representatives and half of the North Carolina Senate were up for election. Democrats maintained control of both state legislative chambers.

North Carolina Senate
Party	Before	After	Change
Democratic	31	30	▼1
Republican	19	20	▲1
Total	50	50	

North Carolina House of Representatives
Party	Before	After	Change
Democratic	68	68	Steady
Republican	52	52	Steady
Total	120	120	

=== North Dakota ===
All of the seats of the North Dakota House of Representatives and half of the North Dakota Senate were up for election. Republicans maintained control of both state legislative chambers.

North Dakota Senate
Party	Before	After	Change
Republican	26	26	Steady
Democratic-NPL	21	21	Steady
Total	47	47	

North Dakota House of Representatives
Party	Before	After	Change
Republican	61	58	▼3
Democratic-NPL	33	36	▲3
Total	94	94	

=== Ohio ===
All of the seats of the Ohio House of Representatives and half of the Ohio Senate were up for election. Democrats won control of the House of Representatives while Republicans maintained control of the Senate.

Ohio Senate
Party	Before	After	Change
Republican	21	21	Steady
Democratic	12	12	Steady
Total	33	33	

Ohio House of Representatives
Party	Before	After	Change
Democratic	46	53	▲7
Republican	53	46	▼7
Total	99	99	

=== Oklahoma ===
All of the seats of the Oklahoma House of Representatives and half of the Oklahoma Senate were up for election. Republicans won control of the Senate and maintained control of the House.

Oklahoma Senate
Party	Before	After	Change
Republican	24	26	▲2
Democratic	24	22	▼2
Total	48	48	

Oklahoma House of Representatives
Party	Before	After	Change
Republican	57	61	▲4
Democratic	44	40	▼4
Total	101	101	

=== Oregon ===
All of the seats of the Oregon House of Representatives and half of the Oregon Senate were up for election. Democrats maintained control of both legislative chambers.

Oregon State Senate
Party	Before	After	Change
Democratic	19	18	▼1
Republican	11	12	▲1
Total	30	30	

Oregon House of Representatives
Party	Before	After	Change
Democratic	31	36	▲5
Republican	29	24	▼5
Total	60	60	

=== Pennsylvania ===
All of the seats of the Pennsylvania House of Representatives and half of the Pennsylvania Senate were up for election. Republicans maintained control of the Senate while Democrats maintained control of the House of Representatives.

Pennsylvania State Senate
Party	Before	After	Change
Republican	29	30	▲1
Democratic	21	20	▼1
Total	50	50	

Pennsylvania House of Representatives
Party	Before	After	Change
Democratic	102	104	▲2
Republican	101	99	▼2
Total	203	203	

=== Rhode Island ===
All of the seats of the Rhode Island Legislature were up for election. Democrats maintained control of both state legislative chambers.

Rhode Island Senate
Party	Before	After	Change
Democratic	33	33	Steady
Republican	5	4	▼1
Independent	0	1	▲1
Total	38	38	

Rhode Island House of Representatives
Party	Before	After	Change
Democratic	60	69	▲9
Republican	15	6	▼9
Total	75	75	

=== South Carolina ===
All of the seats of the South Carolina legislature were up for election. Republicans maintained control of both state legislative chambers.

South Carolina Senate
Party	Before	After	Change
Republican	27	27	Steady
Democratic	19	19	Steady
Total	46	46	

South Carolina House of Representatives
Party	Before	After	Change
Republican	73	73	Steady
Democratic	51	51	Steady
Total	124	124	

=== South Dakota ===
All of the seats of the South Dakota Legislature were up for election. Republicans maintained control of both state legislative chambers.

South Dakota Senate
Party	Before	After	Change
Republican	20	21	▲1
Democratic	15	14	▼1
Total	35	35	

South Dakota House of Representatives
Party	Before	After	Change
Republican	50	46	▼4
Democratic	20	24	▲4
Total	70	70	

=== Tennessee ===
All of the seats of the Tennessee House of Representatives and half of the Tennessee Senate were up for election. Republicans won control of both state legislative chambers.

Tennessee Senate
Party	Before	After	Change
Republican	16	19	▲3
Democratic	16	14	▼2
Independent	1	0	▼1
Total	33	33	

Tennessee House of Representatives
Party	Before	After	Change
Republican	46	50	▲4
Democratic	53	49	▼4
Total	99	99	

=== Texas ===
All of the seats of the Texas House of Representatives and half of the Texas Senate were up for election. Republicans maintained control of both state legislative chambers.

Texas Senate
Party	Before	After	Change
Republican	20	19	▼1
Democratic	11	12	▲1
Total	31	31	

Texas House of Representatives
Party	Before	After	Change
Republican	79	76	▼3
Democratic	71	74	▲3
Total	150	150	

=== Utah ===
All of the seats of the Utah House of Representatives and half of the Utah Senate were up for election. Republicans maintained control of both state legislative chambers.

Utah State Senate
Party	Before	After	Change
Republican	21	21	Steady
Democratic	8	8	Steady
Total	29	29	

Utah House of Representatives
Party	Before	After	Change
Republican	55	53	▼2
Democratic	20	22	▲2
Total	75	75	

=== Vermont ===
All of the seats of the Vermont Legislature were up for election. Democrats maintained control of both state legislative chambers.

Vermont Senate
Party	Before	After	Change
Democratic	23	23	Steady
Republican	7	7	Steady
Total	30	30	

Vermont House of Representatives
Party	Before	After	Change
Democratic	93	94	▲1
Republican	49	48	▼1
Progressive	6	5	▼1
Independent	2	3	▲1
Total	150	150	

=== Washington ===
All of the seats of the Washington House of Representatives and half of the Washington Senate were up for election. Democrats maintained control of both legislative chambers.

Washington State Senate
Party	Before	After	Change
Democratic	32	31	▼1
Republican	17	18	▲1
Total	49	49	

Washington House of Representatives
Party	Before	After	Change
Democratic	63	62	▼1
Republican	35	36	▲1
Total	98	98	

=== West Virginia ===
All of the seats of the West Virginia House of Delegates and half of the West Virginia Senate were up for election. Democrats maintained control of both state legislative chambers.

West Virginia Senate
Party	Before	After	Change
Democratic	23	26	▲3
Republican	11	8	▼3
Total	34	34	

West Virginia House of Delegates
Party	Before	After	Change
Democratic	72	71	▼1
Republican	28	29	▲1
Total	100	100	

=== Wisconsin ===
All of the seats of the Wisconsin Assembly and half of the Wisconsin Senate were up for election. Democrats maintained control of the Senate and won control of the Assembly.

Wisconsin Senate
Party	Before	After	Change
Democratic	18	18	Steady
Republican	15	15	Steady
Total	33	33	

Wisconsin State Assembly
Party	Before	After	Change
Democratic	47	52	▲5
Republican	51	46	▼5
Independent	1	1	Steady
Total	99	99	

=== Wyoming ===
All of the seats of the Wyoming House of Representatives and half of the Wyoming Senate were up for election. Republicans maintained control of both state legislative chambers.

Wyoming Senate
Party	Before	After	Change
Republican	23	23	Steady
Democratic	7	7	Steady
Total	30	30	

Wyoming House of Representatives
Party	Before	After	Change
Republican	43	41	▼2
Democratic	17	19	▲2
Total	60	60	

== Territorial and federal district summaries ==
=== American Samoa ===
All of the seats of the American Samoa Senate and the American Samoa House of Representatives were up for election. Members of the Senate serve four-year terms, while members of the House of Representatives serve two-year terms. Gubernatorial and legislative elections are conducted on a nonpartisan basis in American Samoa.

=== Guam ===
All of the seats of the unicameral Legislature of Guam were up for election. All members of the legislature serve a two-year term. Democrats retained control of the legislature.

Guam Legislature
Party	Before	After	Change
Democratic	8	10	▲2
Republican	7	5	▼2
Total	15	15	

=== Puerto Rico ===
All of the seats of the Senate of Puerto Rico and the House of Representatives of Puerto Rico are up for election. Members of the Senate and the House of Representatives both serve four-year terms. The New Progressive Party held control of both chambers.

Puerto Rico Senate
Party	Before	After	Change
Popular Democratic	11	9	▼2
New Progressive	15	22	▲7
Puerto Rican Independence	1	0	▼1
Total	27	31	

Puerto Rico House of Representatives
Party	Before	After	Change
Popular Democratic	18	17	▼1
New Progressive	32	37	▲5
Puerto Rican Independence	1	0	▼1
Total	51	54	

=== U.S. Virgin Islands ===
All of the seats of the unicameral Legislature of the Virgin Islands were up for election. All members of the legislature serve a two-year term. Democrats retained control of the legislature.

Virgin Islands Legislature
Party	Before	After	Change
Democratic	9	10	▲1
Independent	6	5	▼1
Total	15	15	

=== Washington, D.C. ===
The Council of the District of Columbia serves as the legislative branch of the federal district of Washington, D.C. Half of the council seats are up for election. Council members serve four-year terms. Democrats retained supermajority control of the council.

District of Columbia Council
Party	Before	After	Change
Democratic	11	11	Steady
Independent	1	2	▲1
Total	13	13	
