= Nan Orrock =

American politician (born 1943)

Nan Grogan Orrock
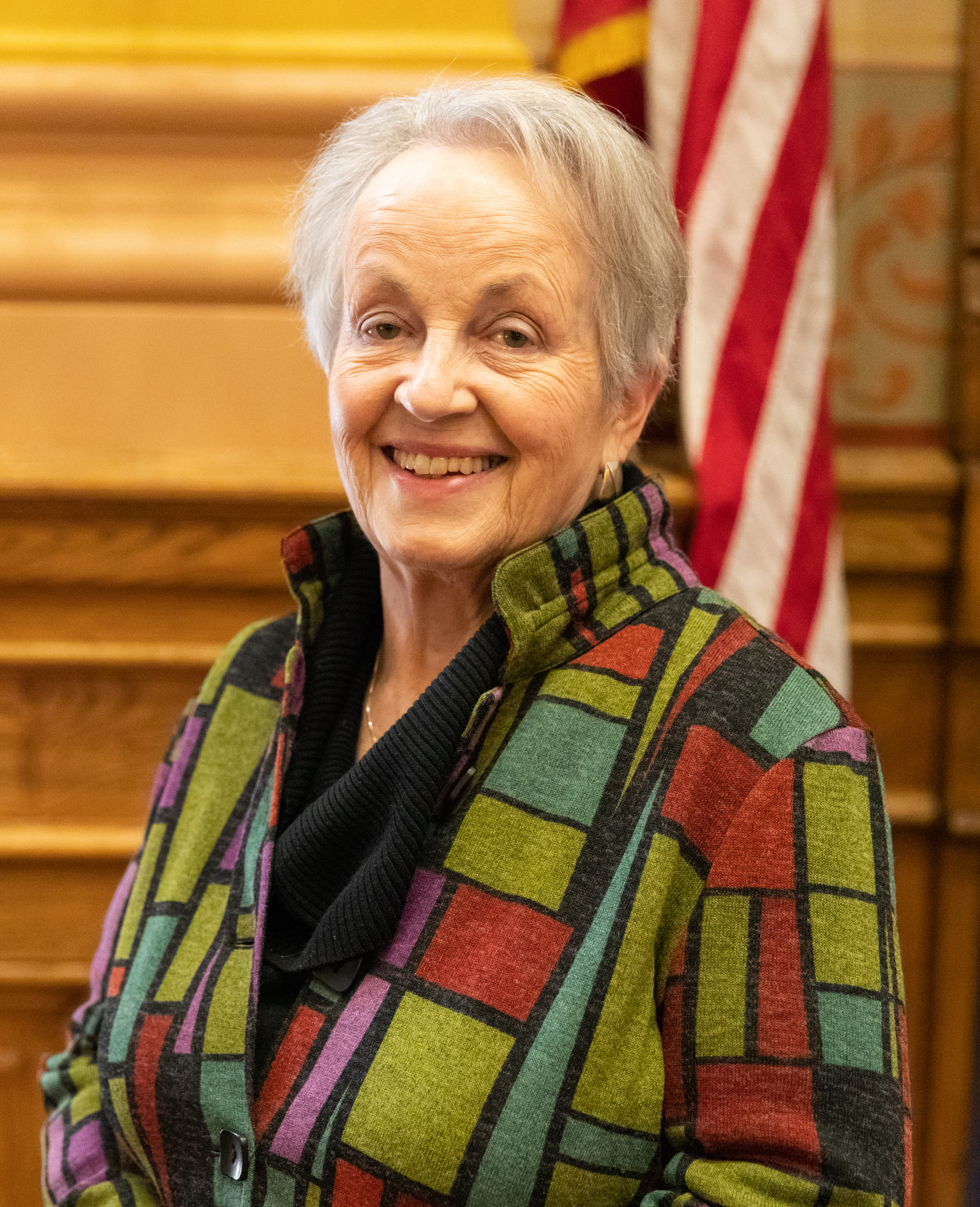

Member of the Georgia State Senate from the 36th district
- Incumbent
- Assumed office January 8, 2007
- Preceded by: Sam Zamarripa

Member of the Georgia House of Representatives
- In office January 12, 1987 – January 8, 2007
- Preceded by: Paul Bolster
- Succeeded by: Robbin Shipp
- Constituency: 30th district (1987–1993); 56th district (1993–2003); 51st district (2003–2005); 58th district (2005–2007)

Personal details
- Born: November 8, 1943 (age 82) Abingdon, Virginia, U.S.
- Party: Democratic
- Children: 2
- Education: Mary Washington College of the University of Virginia
- Alma mater: Mary Washington College (B.A.)
- Committees: Agriculture and Consumer Affairs

Nan Grogan Orrock (born November 8, 1943) is an American politician serving as the Democratic State Senator in the Georgia State Senate, representing Senate District 36 in eastern Atlanta. Following the 2006 retirement of State Senator Sam Zamarripa, Orrock was a candidate for his district; in the Democratic primary held on July 18, 2006 Orrock defeated Grace Davis to win a seat in the State Senate since she has no Republican opponent for the general election. She was sworn into office in 2007. She was previously a member of the Georgia House of Representatives from 1987, representing the 58th district. She was the Vice-Chair of the House Democratic Caucus and the former Majority Whip, the first woman to ever hold this role. Orrock was once a member of American Legislative Exchange Council (ALEC), but has since been critical of their influence.

Orrock founded both the Georgia Legislative Women's Caucus and the Working Families Agenda caucus. Her legislative successes include passage of the Georgia Family Medical Leave Act, the Prescriptive Equity for Contraceptives Act, the Chlamydia Screening Act, Georgia Hate Crimes Act, and the Omnibus AIDS statute. She continually advocates for environmentally sound policies, and worked on passing monumental legislation surrounding regulation of landfills.

Her activism began back in 1963 when she participated in the March on Washington for Jobs and Freedom. Following this, she proceeded to work with SNCC in Georgia and Mississippi and lead civil rights projects in the Black Belt counties of her home state of Virginia.

Orrock is the President of the Women Legislators' Lobby, a national network of women state legislators launched by Women's Action for New Directions WAND in 1991, and has been on staff with this organization since 1997.
