= Sam Zamarripa =

American politician (born 1952)

Samuel Zamarripa
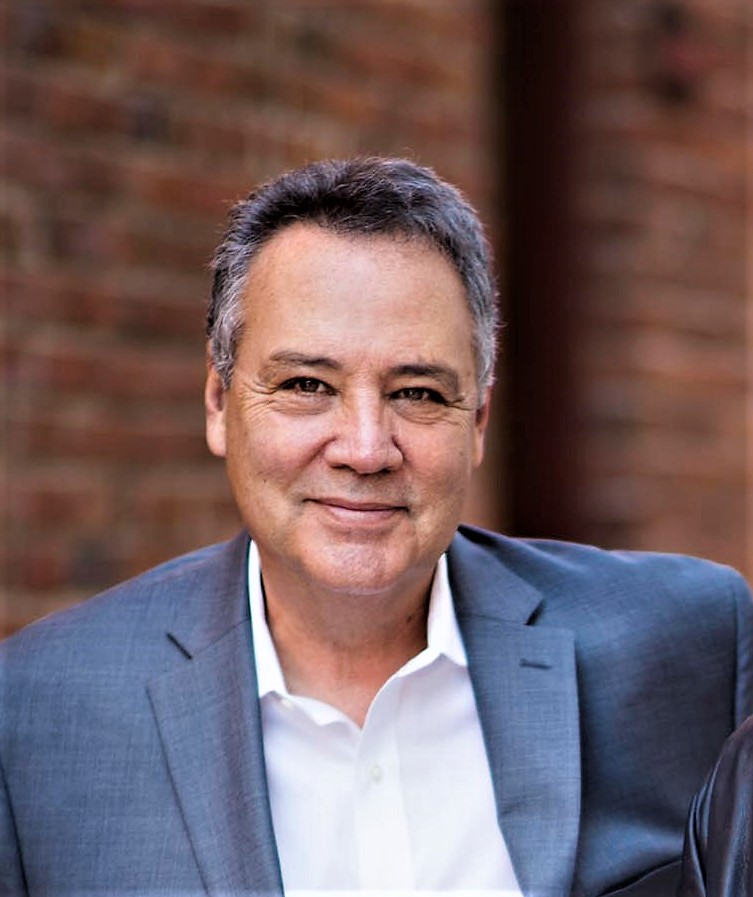
- Zamarripa in March 2017

Member of the Georgia State Senate from the 36th district
- In office 2003–2007
- Preceded by: David Scott
- Succeeded by: Nan Grogan Orrock

Personal details
- Born: December 17, 1952 (age 73) Fort Benning, Georgia, U.S.
- Education: New College of Florida
- Occupation: Entrepreneur, author, politician
- Writing career
- Genre: Magical realism

Samuel Zamarripa (born December 17, 1952) is an American entrepreneur, author, and former politician. He is the proprietor of Doghobble Vineyard and Farm in Dahlonega, Georgia. He was the CEO of Intent Solutions in Atlanta, Georgia from 2017 to 2021. In 2018, Zamarripa led the acquisition of Mundo Hispanico from the Cox Media Group and is now its chairman.

== Biography ==
His first novel, The Spectacle of Let - the Oliet and Obit was published by Floricanto Press in May 2017, with a companion novel The Spectacle of Let - the Soul of a Miracle, published in April 2018 also by Floricanto Press. His genre is commonly described as speculative fiction or contemporary magical realism.

In 2008 he founded Zamarripa Capital Incorporated, a private equity corporation focused on lower-middle-market companies, primarily in the southeastern United States. The company provides capital strategies and transaction consulting for executive teams involved in the sale or acquisition of assets. In 2007, Zamarripa was appointed as a senior advisor to Darby Private Equity, the private equity arm of Franklin Templeton Investments.

He has a long history of public services and was the first Hispanic to serve in the Georgia state senate, representing the 36th District in eastern Fulton County, Georgia, as a Democrat. Zamarripa served two terms in the state senate of Georgia representing the City of Atlanta, where he was the secretary of the State Economic Development Committee and member of the committees on Insurance, Science & Technology, and Transportation. He is widely known for his early work on US immigration policy; some of his remarks are featured in a 2006 documentary entitled, Fighting SB529. He announced in April 2006 that he would not seek re-election and retired undefeated. ^{[1]} He was succeeded by Nan Grogan Orrock.

In 2011, Zamarripa co-founded the Essential Economy Council, a bipartisan, nonprofit 501(c)(3) organization that originates research and communications for educating elected officials and business leaders on the value of Georgia’s most essential labor. The Essential Economy Council issued its first major report in February 2013.

Zamarripa is a director of Assurance America Corporation (ASAM.OB) and chairman of the compensation committee. In 1998, Zamarripa co-founded United Americas Bank, NA of Atlanta, where he was a board member until 2009.

Zamarripa is a trustee of the Annie E. Casey Foundation of Baltimore, Maryland, a lifetime trustee of Syracuse University, and a trustee of Hispanics In Philanthropy. He is the founder of the Georgia Association of Latino Elected Officials and its former chairman. He is a past member of the board of directors of the Mexican American Legal Defense and Educational Fund (MALDEF). He is also a member of the board of Counselors for The Carter Center of Atlanta.

Zamarripa holds a BA from New College of Florida and a Masters of Public Administration from the Maxwell School of Citizenship and Public Affairs at Syracuse University. He is of Mexican-American descent.
