= 2010 United States redistricting cycle =

The 2010 United States redistricting cycle took place following the completion of the 2010 United States census. In all fifty states, various bodies re-drew state legislative districts. States that are apportioned more than one seat in the United States House of Representatives also drew new districts for that legislative body. The resulting new districts were first implemented for the 2011 and 2012 elections.

The rules for redistricting vary from state to state, but all states draw new legislative and congressional maps either in the state legislature, in redistricting commissions, or through some combination of the state legislature and a redistricting commission. Though various laws and court decisions have put constraints on redistricting, many redistricting institutions continue to practice gerrymandering, which involves drawing new districts with the intention of giving a political advantage to specific groups. Political parties prepare for redistricting years in advance, and partisan control of redistricting institutions can provide a party with major advantages. Aside from the possibility of mid-decade redistricting, the districts drawn in the 2010 redistricting cycle will remain in effect until the next round of redistricting following the 2020 United States census.

This was the first cycle since the 2000 cycle.

== United States House of Representatives ==
=== Reapportionment ===
United States Congressional Apportionment 2012-2022

Article One of the United States Constitution establishes the United States House of Representatives and apportions representatives to the states based on population, with reapportionment occurring every ten years. The decennial United States census determines the population of each state. Each of the fifty states is guaranteed at least one representative, and the Huntington–Hill method is used to assign the remaining 385 seats to states based on the population of each state. Congress has provided for reapportionment every ten years since the enactment of the Reapportionment Act of 1929. Since 1913, the U.S. House of Representatives has consisted of 435 members, a number set by statute, though the number of representatives temporarily increased in 1959. Reapportionment also affects presidential elections, as each state is guaranteed electoral votes equivalent to the number of representatives and senators representing the state.

=== Newly created districts and eliminated districts ===
The new seats were first contested in the 2012 United States House of Representatives elections.

Eliminated districts	Created districts
Illinois 19; Iowa 5; Louisiana 7; Massachusetts 10; Michigan 15; Missouri 9; New Jersey 13; New York 28; New York 29; Ohio 17; Ohio 18; Pennsylvania 19	Arizona 9; Florida 26; Florida 27; Georgia 14; Nevada 4; South Carolina 7; Texas 33; Texas 34; Texas 35; Texas 36; Utah 4; Washington 10

== Results of the 2010 cycle ==
Partisan control of congressional redistricting after the 2010 elections, with the number of U.S. House seats each state will receive. Democratic control Republican control Split or bipartisan control Independent redistricting commission No redistricting necessary

Partisan control of U.S. state legislative redistricting following the 2010 census. Democratic control Republican control Split or bipartisan control Independent redistricting commission

As Republicans had made significant gains in the 2010 state legislative elections, the Republican State Leadership Committee established a program called REDMAP in order to draw legislative, congressional and other district maps to ensure Republican victories in future elections. Among the strategists involved in the drawing of favorable maps was Thomas Hofeller and strategist Chris Jankowski.

Democrats were particularly unhappy with the results of the 2012 House elections in which Democratic candidates for the U.S. House received more votes than Republican House candidates, but Republicans retained control of the chamber. After the results of the 2010 census results were released:

- Legislative Republican majorities in both chamber and governorship were in control of the redistricting process over 210 congressional districts across 18 states
- Legislative Democratic majorities in both chamber and governorship were in control of the redistricting process over 44 congressional districts across 6 states
- Both parties, whether through divided government or through bipartisan commissions, were in control of the redistricting process over 100 congressional districts across 15 states
- Independent commissions were in control of the redistricting process over 74 congressional districts across 4 states.
- 7 states were represented by at-large House districts

In addition, the Democrats were deeply disadvantaged by the resulting state legislative maps, with similar effects of gerrymandering being observed in Wisconsin, Pennsylvania, Virginia, Michigan and North Carolina.

This perceived skewing of the redistricting process set the stage for several legal challenges from voters and groups in the court system, including several heard at the Supreme Court level.

== Changes to the redistricting process since 2012 ==
=== Federal court rulings ===
In the 2013 case, Shelby County v. Holder, the Supreme Court struck down Section 4(b) of the Voting Rights Act, which was a coverage formula that determined which states and counties required preclearance from the Justice Department before making changes to voting laws and procedures. The formula had covered states with a history of minority voter disenfranchisement, and the preclearance procedure was designed to block discriminatory voting practices. In the 2019 case of Rucho v. Common Cause, the Supreme Court held that claims of partisan gerrymandering present nonjusticiable political questions that cannot be reviewed by federal courts.

In another 2019 case, Department of Commerce v. New York, the Supreme Court blocked the Trump administration from adding a question to the 2020 census regarding the citizenship of respondents.

=== State court rulings ===
In 2015, the Supreme Court of Florida ordered the state to draw a new congressional map on the basis of a 2010 state constitutional amendment that banned partisan gerrymandering.

In 2018, the Pennsylvania Supreme Court threw out the 2011 U.S. House of Representatives map on the grounds that it violated the state constitution; the court established new redistricting standards requiring districts to be compact and to minimize the splitting of counties and towns.

In 2019, a North Carolina state court struck down the state's legislative districts on the grounds that the district had been created with the partisan intent of favoring Republican candidates.

=== Ballot measures ===
In 2015, Ohio voters approved a ballot measure changing the composition of the commission charged with drawing state legislative districts, adding two legislative appointees to the commission and creating rules and guidelines designed to make partisan gerrymandering more difficult. In May 2018, Ohio voters approved a proposal that modified the state's congressional redistricting processes.

In 2018, voters in Colorado and Michigan approved of a proposal to establish an independent redistricting commission for congressional and state legislative districts in their respective states. Missouri voters approved of a proposal to have a "non-partisan state demographer" draw state legislative districts. In Utah, voters approved the creation of a redistricting commission to draw congressional and state legislative districts, though the Utah state legislature retains the power to reject these maps.

In 2020, voters in Virginia approved the establishment of a bipartisan redistricting commission for both congressional and state legislative redistricting. The commission consists eight legislators and eight non-legislator citizens, with the commission split evenly between Democrats and Republicans.
