= 2006 United States state legislative elections =

- November 7, 2006

88 legislative chambers in 46 states
	Majority party	Minority party	Third party
Party	Democratic	Republican	Coalition
Chambers before	48	50	0
Chambers after	57 (Note: The Iowa Senate was evenly split prior to the election. Thus it is not included in the prior total.)	41	1 (Note: The Alaska Senate was controlled by a coalition of Democrats and Republicans. The minority caucus consists of Republicans who were not part of the majority coalition.)
Overall change	▲9	▼9	▲1
- Map of upper house elections: Democrats gained control Democrats retained control Republicans retained control Coalition gained control Non-partisan legislature No regularly-scheduled elections

- Map of lower house elections: Democrats gained control Democrats retained control Republicans gained control Republicans retained control Non-partisan legislature No regularly-scheduled elections

The 2006 United States state legislative elections were held on November 7, 2006, halfway through President George W. Bush's second term in office. This election was a wave elections in the United States election, and saw Democrats simultaneously reclaim both houses of Congress and pick up six governorships. Elections were held for 90 legislative chambers, with all states but Louisiana, Mississippi, New Jersey, and Virginia holding elections in at least one house. Kansas, New Mexico, and South Carolina held elections for their lower, but not upper house. Four territorial chambers in three territories and the District of Columbia were up, including the newly created territorial legislature in the U.S. Virgin Islands.

Democrats flipped ten legislative chambers. Democrats gained control of the Oregon House of Representatives, the Minnesota House of Representatives, both houses of the Iowa General Assembly, and both houses of the New Hampshire General Court for the first time since 1875, giving them complete legislative control over those states. The Iowa Senate was previously tied. Democrats also won majorities in the Wisconsin Senate, the Michigan House of Representatives, the Pennsylvania House of Representatives, and the Indiana House of Representatives, turning those legislatures into split bodies. Additionally, a Democratic-led coalition was created in the Alaska Senate, which was previously a Republican majority. Democrats won more state legislative chambers than Republicans for the first time since the 2000 elections.

Conversely, Republicans gained control of the Montana House of Representatives with the lone Constitution Party representative voting for Republican control of that body.

Democrats won a trifecta in Iowa for the first time since 1967, and in New Hampshire since 1875.

== Summary table ==
Regularly scheduled elections were held in 90 of the 99 state legislative chambers in the United States. Nationwide, regularly scheduled elections were held for 6,343 of the 7,383 legislative seats. Many legislative chambers held elections for all seats, but some legislative chambers that use staggered elections held elections for only a portion of the total seats in the chamber. The chambers not up for election either hold regularly scheduled elections in odd-numbered years, or have four-year terms and hold all regularly scheduled elections in presidential midterm election years.

Note that this table only covers regularly scheduled elections; additional special elections took place concurrently with these regularly scheduled elections.

State	Upper House				Lower House			
State	Seats up	Total	% up	Term	Seats up	Total	% up	Term
Alabama	35	35	35	4	105	105	105	4
Alaska	19	20	95	4	40	40	100	2
Arizona	30	30	100	2	60	60	100	2
Arkansas	35	35	100	2/4 (Note: The upper houses of Arkansas, Delaware, Florida, Hawaii, Illinois, Minnesota, New Jersey, and Texas use a 2-4-4 term length system.)	100	100	100	2
California	20	40	50	4	80	80	100	2
Colorado	18	35	51	4	65	65	100	2
Connecticut	36	36	100	2	151	151	100	2
Delaware	21	21	100	2/4	41	41	100	2
Florida	40	40	100	2/4	120	120	100	2
Georgia	56	56	100	2	180	180	100	2
Hawaii	25	25	100	2/4	51	51	100	2
Idaho	35	35	100	2	70	70	100	2
Illinois	59	59	100	2/4	118	118	100	2
Indiana	25	50	50	4	100	100	100	2
Iowa	25	50	50	4	100	100	100	2
Kansas	0	40	0	4	125	125	100	2
Kentucky	19	38	50	4	100	100	100	2
Louisiana	0	39	0	4	0	105	0	4
Maine	35	35	100	2	151	151	100	2
Maryland	47	47	47	4	141	141	141	4
Massachusetts	40	40	100	2	160	160	100	2
Michigan	38	38	38	4	110	110	100	2
Minnesota	67	67	100	2/4	134	134	100	2
Mississippi	0	52	0	4	0	122	0	4
Missouri	17	34	50	4	163	163	100	2
Montana	25	50	50	4	100	100	100	2
Nebraska	25 (Note: These figures represent the seats of Nebraska's unicameral legislature.)	49	51	4	N/A (unicameral)			
Nevada	10	21	48	4	42	42	100	2
New Hampshire	24	24	100	2	400	400	100	2
New Jersey	0	40	0	2/4	0	80	0	2
New Mexico	0	42	0	4	70	70	100	2
New York	62	62	100	2	150	150	100	2
North Carolina	50	50	100	2	120	120	100	2
North Dakota	23	47	49	4	47	94	50	4
Ohio	16	33	48	4	99	99	100	2
Oklahoma	24	48	50	4	101	101	100	2
Oregon	15	30	50	4	60	60	100	2
Pennsylvania	25	50	50	4	203	203	100	2
Rhode Island	38	38	100	2	75	75	100	2
South Carolina	0	46	0	4	124	124	100	2
South Dakota	35	35	100	2	70	70	100	2
Tennessee	16	33	48	4	99	99	100	2
Texas	16	31	52	2/4	150	150	100	2
Utah	15	29	52	4	75	75	100	2
Vermont	30	30	100	2	150	150	100	2
Virginia	0	40	0	4	0	100	0	2
Washington	25	49	51	4	98	98	100	2
West Virginia	17	34	50	4	100	100	100	2
Wisconsin	16	33	48	4	99	99	100	2
Wyoming	15	30	50	4	60	60	100	2
Total	1280	1971	65	N/A	4595	5411	85	N/A

== Electoral predictions ==
Early in the election cycle, analysts considered Democrats to have an advantage over Republicans, despite both parties controlling a similar number of competitive legislative chambers. The unpopularity of President George W. Bush, as well as a number of Republican governors, made the party vulnerable to losses in legislatures across the country, with Democrats looking to build on the gains they made in the 2004 elections. In addition to targeting many Republican-held chambers considered imminently vulnerable in 2006, Democrats also sought to make gains in more solidly-Republican chambers, such as the New York State Senate and Ohio House of Representatives, with the hopes of flipping them in 2008. As the cycle progressed, local political factors shifted projections for multiple chambers, usually in the Democrats' favor.

Ratings are designated as follows:

- "Tossup": Competitive, no advantage
- "Lean": Competitive, slight advantage
- "Likely": Not competitive, but opposition could make significant gains
- "Safe": Not competitive at all

State	Chamber	Last election	Rothenberg Nov. 4, 2006	Result
Alabama	Senate	D 25–10	Likely D	D 23–12
Alabama	House of Representatives	D 63–42	Likely D	D 62–43
Alaska	Senate	R 12–8	Likely R	Coal. 15–5
Alaska	House of Representatives	R 26–14	Safe R	R 23–17
Arizona	Senate	R 18–12	Safe R	R 17–13
Arizona	House of Representatives	R 38–22	Safe R	R 33–27
Arkansas	Senate	D 27–8	Safe D	D 27–8
Arkansas	House of Representatives	D 72–28	Safe D	D 72–28
California	State Senate	D 25–15	Safe D	D 25–15
California	State Assembly	D 48–32	Safe D	D 48–32
Colorado	Senate	D 18–17	Lean D	D 20–15
Colorado	House of Representatives	D 35–30	Tossup	D 39–26
Connecticut	State Senate	D 24–12	Safe D	D 24–12
Connecticut	House of Representatives	D 99–52	Safe D	D 107–44
Delaware	Senate	D 13–8	Safe D	D 13–8
Delaware	House of Representatives	R 26–15	Likely R	R 23–18
Florida	Senate	R 26–14	Safe R	R 26–14
Florida	House of Representatives	R 84–36	Safe R	R 78–42
Georgia	State Senate	R 34–22	Safe R	R 34–22
Georgia	House of Representatives	R 99–80–1	Safe R	R 106–74
Hawaii	Senate	D 20–5	Safe D	D 20–5
Hawaii	House of Representatives	D 41–10	Safe D	D 43–8
Idaho	Senate	R 28–7	Safe R	R 28–7
Idaho	House of Representatives	R 57–13	Safe R	R 51–19
Illinois	Senate	D 31–27–1	Safe D	D 37–22
Illinois	House of Representatives	D 65–53	Safe D	D 66–52
Indiana	Senate	R 33–17	Safe R	R 33–17
Indiana	House of Representatives	R 52–48	Tossup	D 51–49
Iowa	Senate	25–25	Tossup	D 30–20
Iowa	House of Representatives	R 51–49	Tossup	D 54–46
Kansas	House of Representatives	R 83–42	Safe R	R 78–47
Kentucky	Senate	R 22–15	Likely R	R 21–16–1
Kentucky	House of Representatives	D 57–43	Likely D	D 61–39
Maine	Senate	D 18–17	Tossup	D 18–17
Maine	House of Representatives	D 76–73–1–1	Tossup	D 90–59–2
Maryland	Senate	D 33–14	Safe D	D 33–14
Maryland	House of Delegates	D 98–43	Safe D	D 104–37
Massachusetts	Senate	D 34–6	Safe D	D 35–5
Massachusetts	House of Representatives	D 137–23	Safe D	D 141–19
Michigan	Senate	R 22–16	Lean R	R 21–17
Michigan	House of Representatives	R 58–52	Lean R	D 58–52
Minnesota	Senate	D 35–31–1	Safe D	D 44–23
Minnesota	House of Representatives	R 68–66	Tossup	D 85–49
Missouri	Senate	R 23–11	Likely R	R 21–13
Missouri	House of Representatives	R 97–66	Likely R	R 92–71
Montana	Senate	D 27–23	Lean D	D 26–24 (Note: Includes a post-election party switch by Senator Sam Kitzenberg which gave Democrats control of the chamber.)
Montana	House of Representatives	D 50–50	Tossup	R 50–49–1
Nevada	Senate	R 12–9	Lean R	R 11–10
Nevada	Assembly	D 26–16	Safe D	D 27–15
New Hampshire	Senate	R 16–8	Lean R	D 14–10
New Hampshire	House of Representatives	R 249–151	Safe R	D 239–160–1
New Mexico	House of Representatives	D 42–28	Safe D	D 42–28
New York	State Senate	R 35–27	Likely R	R 33–29
New York	State Assembly	D 104–46	Safe D	D 106–42–1–1
North Carolina	Senate	D 29–21	Likely D	D 31–19
North Carolina	House of Representatives	D 63–57	Lean D	D 68–52
North Dakota	Senate	R 32–15	Safe R	R 26–21
North Dakota	House of Representatives	R 67–27	Safe R	R 61–33
Ohio	Senate	R 22–11	Likely R	R 21–12
Ohio	House of Representatives	R 61–38	Lean R	R 53–46
Oklahoma	Senate	D 26–22	Tossup	D 24–24
Oklahoma	House of Representatives	R 57–44	Safe R	R 57–44
Oregon	State Senate	D 17–13	Likely D	D 19–11
Oregon	House of Representatives	R 33–27	Tossup	D 31–29
Pennsylvania	State Senate	R 30–20	Likely R	R 29–21
Pennsylvania	House of Representatives	R 110–93	Tossup	D 102–101
Rhode Island	Senate	D 33–5	Safe D	D 33–5
Rhode Island	House of Representatives	D 59–16	Safe D	D 60–15
South Carolina	House of Representatives	R 74–50	Safe R	R 73–51
South Dakota	Senate	R 25–10	Likely R	R 20–15
South Dakota	House of Representatives	R 50–20	Safe R	R 50–20
Tennessee	Senate	R 17–16	Lean R	R 17–16
Tennessee	House of Representatives	D 53–46	Lean D	D 53–46
Texas	Senate	R 19–12	Safe R	R 20–11
Texas	House of Representatives	R 87–63	Safe R	R 81–69
Utah	State Senate	R 21–8	Safe R	R 21–8
Utah	House of Representatives	R 56–19	Safe R	R 55–20
Vermont	Senate	D 21–9	Safe D	D 23–7
Vermont	House of Representatives	D 83–60–6–1	Safe D	D 93–49–6–2
Washington	State Senate	D 26–23	Lean D	D 32–17
Washington	House of Representatives	D 55–43	Lean D	D 62–36
West Virginia	Senate	D 21–13	Safe D	D 23–11
West Virginia	House of Delegates	D 68–32	Likely D	D 72–28
Wisconsin	Senate	R 19–14	Lean R	D 18–15
Wisconsin	State Assembly	R 60–39	Safe R	R 52–47
Wyoming	Senate	R 23–7	Safe R	R 23–7
Wyoming	House of Representatives	R 46–14	Safe R	R 43–17

== Maps ==
Upper house seats by party holding majority in each state
Democratic 50–60% 60–70% 70–80% 80–90%	Republican 50–60% 60–70% 70–80% 80–90%	Tie 50%

Lower house seats by party holding majority in each state
Democratic 50–60% 60–70% 70–80% 80–90%	Republican 50–60% 60–70% 70–80%

Net changes to upper house seats after the 2006 elections
+1 Dem seat +2 Dem seats +4–5 Dem seats +6 Dem seats
+1 Rep seat +2 Rep seats

Net changes to lower house seats after the 2006 elections
+1 Dem seat +2 Dem seats +3–5 Dem seats
+6–14 Dem seats +22 Dem seats +88 Dem seats
+1 Const. seat +5 Rep seats

== State summaries ==
=== Alabama ===
All of the seats of the Alabama House of Representatives and half of the Alabama Senate were up for election. Democrats maintained control of both state legislative chambers.

Alabama Senate
Party	Before	After	Change
Democratic	25	23	▼2
Republican	10	12	▲2
Total	35	35	

Alabama House of Representatives
Party	Before	After	Change
Democratic	62	62	Steady
Republican	43	43	Steady
Total	105	105	

=== Alaska ===
All of the seats of the Alaska House of Representatives and half of the Alaska Senate were up for election. A Democratic-led coalition established control of the Senate while Republicans maintained control of the House.

Alaska Senate
Party	Before	After	Change
Democratic	8	9	▲1
Republican	12	6	▼1
Republican	12	5	▼1
Total	20	20	

Alaska House of Representatives
Party	Before	After	Change
Republican	26	23	▼3
Democratic	14	17	▲3
Total	40	40	

=== Arizona ===
All of the seats of the Arizona Legislature were up for election. Republicans maintained control of both state legislative chambers.

Arizona Senate
Party	Before	After	Change
Republican	18	17	▼1
Democratic	12	13	▲1
Total	30	30	

Arizona House of Representatives
Party	Before	After	Change
Republican	39	33	▼6
Democratic	21	27	▲6
Total	60	60	

=== Arkansas ===
All of the seats of the Arkansas House of Representatives and half of the Arkansas Senate were up for election. Democrats maintained control of both state legislative chambers.

Arkansas Senate
Party	Before	After	Change
Democratic	27	27	Steady
Republican	8	8	Steady
Total	35	35	

Arkansas House of Representatives
Party	Before	After	Change
Democratic	72	72	Steady
Republican	28	28	Steady
Total	100	100	

=== California ===
All of the seats of the California House of Representatives and half of the California Senate were up for election. Democrats maintained control of both state legislative chambers.

California State Senate
Party	Before	After	Change
Democratic	25	25	Steady
Republican	15	15	Steady
Total	40	40	

California State Assembly
Party	Before	After	Change
Democratic	48	48	Steady
Republican	32	32	Steady
Total	80	80	

=== Colorado ===
All of the seats of the Colorado House of Representatives and half of the Colorado Senate were up for election. Democrats maintained control of both state legislative chambers.

Colorado Senate
Party	Before	After	Change
Democratic	18	20	▲2
Republican	17	15	▼2
Total	35	35	

Colorado House of Representatives
Party	Before	After	Change
Democratic	35	39	▲4
Republican	30	26	▼4
Total	65	65	

=== Connecticut ===
All of the seats of the Connecticut Legislature were up for election. Democrats maintained control of both state legislative chambers.

Connecticut State Senate
Party	Before	After	Change
Democratic	24	24	Steady
Republican	12	12	Steady
Total	36	36	

Connecticut House of Representatives
Party	Before	After	Change
Democratic	99	107	▲8
Republican	52	44	▼8
Total	151	151	

=== Delaware ===
All of the seats of the Delaware House of Representatives and half of the Delaware Senate were up for election. Democrats maintained control of the Senate while Republicans maintained control of the House.

Delaware Senate
Party	Before	After	Change
Democratic	13	13	Steady
Republican	8	8	Steady
Total	21	21	

Delaware House of Representatives
Party	Before	After	Change
Republican	26	23	▼3
Democratic	15	18	▲3
Total	41	41	

=== Florida ===
All of the seats of the Florida House of Representatives and half of the Florida Senate were up for election. Republicans maintained control of both state legislative chambers.

Florida Senate
Party	Before	After	Change
Republican	26	26	Steady
Democratic	14	14	Steady
Total	40	40	

Florida House of Representatives
Party	Before	After	Change
Republican	85	78	▼7
Democratic	35	42	▲7
Total	120	120	

=== Georgia ===
All of the seats of the Georgia Legislature were up for election. Republicans maintained control of both state legislative chambers.

Georgia State Senate
Party	Before	After	Change
Republican	34	34	Steady
Democratic	22	22	Steady
Total	56	56	

Georgia House of Representatives
Party	Before	After	Change
Republican	101	106	▲5
Democratic	78	74	▼4
Independent	1	0	▼1
Total	180	180	

=== Hawaii ===
All of the seats of the Hawaii House of Representatives and half of the Hawaii Senate were up for election. Democrats maintained control of both state legislative chambers.

Hawaii Senate
Party	Before	After	Change
Democratic	20	20	Steady
Republican	5	5	Steady
Total	25	25	

Hawaii House of Representatives
Party	Before	After	Change
Democratic	41	43	▲2
Republican	10	8	▼2
Total	51	51	

=== Idaho ===
All of the seats of the Idaho Legislature were up for election. Republicans maintained control of both state legislative chambers.

Idaho Senate
Party	Before	After	Change
Republican	28	28	Steady
Democratic	7	7	Steady
Total	35	35	

Idaho House of Representatives
Party	Before	After	Change
Republican	57	51	▼6
Democratic	13	19	▲6
Total	70	70	

=== Illinois ===
All of the seats of the Illinois House of Representatives and 2/3rds of the Illinois Senate were up for election. Democrats maintained control of both state legislative chambers.

Illinois Senate
Party	Before	After	Change
Democratic	31	37	▲6
Republican	27	22	▼5
Independent	1	0	▼1
Total	59	59	

Illinois House of Representatives
Party	Before	After	Change
Democratic	65	66	▲1
Republican	53	52	▼1
Total	118	118	

=== Indiana ===
All of the seats of the Indiana House of Representatives and half of the Indiana Senate were up for election. Republicans maintained control of the Senate while Democrats gained control of the House of Representatives.

Indiana Senate
Party	Before	After	Change
Republican	33	33	Steady
Democratic	17	17	Steady
Total	50	50	

Indiana House of Representatives
Party	Before	After	Change
Democratic	48	51	▲3
Republican	52	49	▼3
Total	100	100	

=== Iowa ===
All of the seats of the Iowa House of Representatives and half of the Iowa Senate were up for election. Democrats gained control of both state legislative chambers.

Iowa Senate
Party	Before	After	Change
Democratic	25	30	▲5
Republican	25	20	▼5
Total	50	50	

Iowa House of Representatives
Party	Before	After	Change
Democratic	49	54	▲5
Republican	51	46	▼5
Total	100	100	

=== Kansas ===
All of the seats of the Kansas House of Representatives were up for election. Republicans maintained control of the House.

Kansas House of Representatives
Party	Before	After	Change
Republican	83	78	▼5
Democratic	42	47	▲5
Total	125	125	

=== Kentucky ===
All of the seats of the Kentucky House of Representatives and half of the Kentucky Senate were up for election. Republicans maintained control of the Senate and Democrats maintained control of the House of Representatives.

Kentucky Senate
Party	Before	After	Change
Republican	21	21	Steady
Independent	1	1	Steady
Democratic	16	16	Steady
Total	38	38	

Kentucky House of Representatives
Party	Before	After	Change
Democratic	57	61	▲4
Republican	43	39	▼4
Total	100	100	

=== Maine ===
All of the seats of the Maine Legislature were up for election. Democrats maintained control of both state legislative chambers.

Maine Senate
Party	Before	After	Change
Democratic	18	18	Steady
Republican	17	17	Steady
Total	35	35	

Maine House of Representatives
Party	Before	After	Change
Democratic	76	90	▲14
Republican	73	59	▼14
Independent	1	2	▲1
Green	1	0	▼1
Total	151	151	

=== Maryland ===
All of the seats of the Maryland General Assembly were up for election. Democrats maintained control of both state legislative chambers.

Maryland Senate
Party	Before	After	Change
Democratic	33	33	Steady
Republican	14	14	Steady
Total	47	47	

Maryland House of Delegates
Party	Before	After	Change
Democratic	98	104	▲6
Republican	43	37	▼6
Total	160	160	

=== Massachusetts ===
All of the seats of the Massachusetts Legislature were up for election. Democrats maintained control of both state legislative chambers.

Massachusetts Senate
Party	Before	After	Change
Democratic	34	35	▲1
Republican	6	5	▼1
Total	40	40	

Massachusetts House of Representatives
Party	Before	After	Change
Democratic	138	141	▲3
Republican	21	19	▼2
Independent	1	0	▼1
Total	160	160	

=== Michigan ===
All of the seats of the Michigan Legislature were up for election. Republicans maintained control of the Senate while Democrats won control of the House of Representatives.

Michigan Senate
Party	Before	After	Change
Republican	22	21	▼1
Democratic	16	17	▲1
Total	38	38	

Michigan House of Representatives
Party	Before	After	Change
Democratic	52	58	▲6
Republican	58	52	▼6
Total	110	110	

=== Minnesota ===
All of the seats of the Minnesota Legislature were up. Democrats maintained control of the Senate and won control of the House.

Minnesota Senate
Party	Before	After	Change
Democratic (DFL)	38	44	▲6
Republican	29	23	▼6
Total	67	67	

Minnesota House of Representatives
Party	Before	After	Change
Democratic (DFL)	66	85	▲19
Republican	68	49	▼19
Total	134	134	

=== Missouri ===
All of the seats of the Missouri House of Representatives and half of the Missouri Senate were up for election. Republicans maintained control of both state legislative chambers.

Missouri Senate
Party	Before	After	Change
Republican	23	21	▼2
Democratic	11	13	▲2
Total	34	34	

Missouri House of Representatives
Party	Before	After	Change
Republican	97	92	▼5
Democratic	66	71	▲5
Total	163	163	

=== Montana ===
All of the seats of the Montana House of Representatives and half of the Montana Senate were up for election. The Senate was initially tied after the election, but Democrats maintained control after Republican Sam Kitzenberg switched parties. Republicans flipped control of the House after the Constitution Party won a single seat, with their member caucusing with the Republicans.

Montana Senate
Party	Before	After	Change
Democratic	27	26	▼1
Republican	23	24	▲1
Total	50	50	

Montana House of Representatives
Party	Before	After	Change
Republican	50	50	Steady
Constitution	0	1	▲1
Democratic	50 (Note: The Democratic Party controlled the chamber by virtue of holding the governor's office.)	49	▼1
Total	100	100	

=== Nebraska ===
Nebraska is the only U.S. state with a unicameral legislature; half of the seats of the Nebraska Legislature were up for election. Nebraska is also unique in that its legislature is officially non-partisan and holds non-partisan elections, although the Democratic and Republican parties each endorse legislative candidates. Republicans maintained control.

Nebraska Legislature
Party	Before	After	Change
Republican	32	30	▼2
Democratic	15	17	▲2
Independent	2	2	Steady
Total	49	49	

=== Nevada ===
All of the seats of the Nevada House of Representatives and half of the Nevada Senate were up for election. Democrats maintained control of the House while Republicans maintained control of the Senate.

Nevada Senate
Party	Before	After	Change
Republican	12	11	▼1
Democratic	9	10	▲1
Total	21	21	

Nevada Assembly
Party	Before	After	Change
Democratic	26	27	▲1
Republican	16	15	▼1
Total	42	42	

=== New Hampshire ===
All of the seats of the New Hampshire House of Representatives and the New Hampshire Senate were up for election. Democrats gained control of both legislative chambers.

New Hampshire Senate
Party	Before	After	Change
Democratic	8	14	▲6
Republican	16	10	▼6
Total	24	24	

New Hampshire House of Representatives
Party	Before	After	Change
Democratic	151	239	▲88
Republican	249	160	▼89
Independent	0	1	▲1
Total	400	400	

=== New Mexico ===
All of the seats of the New Mexico House of Representatives were up for election; Democrats maintained control.

New Mexico House of Representatives
Party	Before	After	Change
Democratic	42	42	Steady
Republican	28	28	Steady
Total	70	70	

=== New York ===
All of the seats of the New York Legislature were up for election. Republicans maintained control of the Senate while Democrats maintained control of the Assembly.

New York State Senate
Party	Before	After	Change
Republican	35	33	▼2
Democratic	27	29	▲2
Total	62	62	

New York State Assembly
Party	Before	After	Change
Democratic	103	106	▲3
Independence	0	1	▲1
Working Families	0	1	▲1
Republican	47	42	▼5
Total	150	150	

=== North Carolina ===
All of the seats of the North Carolina House of Representatives and half of the North Carolina Senate were up for election. Democrats maintained control of both state legislative chambers.

North Carolina Senate
Party	Before	After	Change
Democratic	29	31	▲2
Republican	21	19	▼2
Total	50	50	

North Carolina House of Representatives
Party	Before	After	Change
Democratic	63	68	▲5
Republican	57	52	▼5
Total	120	120	

=== North Dakota ===
All of the seats of the North Dakota House of Representatives and half of the North Dakota Senate were up for election. Republicans maintained control of both state legislative chambers.

North Dakota Senate
Party	Before	After	Change
Republican	32	26	▼6
Democratic-NPL	15	21	▲6
Total	47	47	

North Dakota House of Representatives
Party	Before	After	Change
Republican	67	61	▼6
Democratic-NPL	27	33	▲6
Total	94	94	

=== Ohio ===
All of the seats of the Ohio House of Representatives and half of the Ohio Senate were up for election. Republicans maintained control of both chambers.

Ohio Senate
Party	Before	After	Change
Republican	22	21	▼1
Democratic	11	12	▲1
Total	33	33	

Ohio House of Representatives
Party	Before	After	Change
Republican	61	53	▼8
Democratic	38	46	▲8
Total	99	99	

=== Oklahoma ===
All of the seats of the Oklahoma House of Representatives and half of the Oklahoma Senate were up for election. Democrats maintained effective control of the newly tied Senate with the Lieutenant Governor's tie-breaking vote, although both parties elected a co-president of the Senate. Republicans maintained control of the House.

Oklahoma Senate
Party	Before	After	Change
Democratic	26	24	▼2
Republican	22	24	▲2
Total	48	48	

Oklahoma House of Representatives
Party	Before	After	Change
Republican	57	57	Steady
Democratic	44	44	Steady
Total	101	101	

=== Oregon ===
All of the seats of the Oregon House of Representatives and half of the Oregon Senate were up for election. Democrats maintained control of the Senate and won control of the House.

Oregon State Senate
Party	Before	After	Change
Democratic	17	19	▲2
Republican	13	11	▼2
Total	30	30	

Oregon House of Representatives
Party	Before	After	Change
Democratic	27	31	▲4
Republican	33	29	▼4
Total	60	60	

=== Pennsylvania ===
All of the seats of the Pennsylvania House of Representatives and half of the Pennsylvania Senate were up for election. Republicans maintained control of the Senate while Democrats won control of the House of Representatives.

Pennsylvania State Senate
Party	Before	After	Change
Republican	29	29	Steady
Democratic	21	21	Steady
Total	50	50	

Pennsylvania House of Representatives
Party	Before	After	Change
Democratic	94	102	▲8
Republican	109	101	▼8
Total	203	203	

=== Rhode Island ===
All of the seats of the Rhode Island Legislature were up for election. Democrats maintained control of both state legislative chambers.

Rhode Island Senate
Party	Before	After	Change
Democratic	33	33	Steady
Republican	5	5	Steady
Total	38	38	

Rhode Island House of Representatives
Party	Before	After	Change
Democratic	59	60	▲1
Republican	16	15	▼1
Total	75	75	

=== South Carolina ===
All of the seats of the South Carolina House of Representatives were up for election. Republicans maintained control of both the House.

South Carolina House of Representatives
Party	Before	After	Change
Republican	74	73	▼1
Democratic	50	51	▲1
Total	124	124	

=== South Dakota ===
All of the seats of the South Dakota Legislature were up for election. Republicans maintained control of both state legislative chambers.

South Dakota Senate
Party	Before	After	Change
Republican	25	20	▼5
Democratic	10	15	▲5
Total	35	35	

South Dakota House of Representatives
Party	Before	After	Change
Republican	51	50	▼1
Democratic	19	20	▲1
Total	70	70	

=== Tennessee ===
All of the seats of the Tennessee House of Representatives and half of the Tennessee Senate were up for election. Republicans maintained control of the Senate while Democrats maintained control of the House.

Tennessee Senate
Party	Before	After	Change
Republican	18	17	▼1
Democratic	15	16	▲1
Total	33	33	

Tennessee House of Representatives
Party	Before	After	Change
Democratic	53	53	Steady
Republican	46	46	Steady
Total	99	99	

=== Texas ===
All of the seats of the Texas House of Representatives and half of the Texas Senate were up for election. Republicans maintained control of both state legislative chambers.

Texas Senate
Party	Before	After	Change
Republican	19	20	▲1
Democratic	12	11	▼1
Total	31	31	

Texas House of Representatives
Party	Before	After	Change
Republican	86	81	▼5
Democratic	64	69	▲5
Total	150	150	

=== Utah ===
All of the seats of the Utah House of Representatives and half of the Utah Senate were up for election. Republicans maintained control of both state legislative chambers.

Utah State Senate
Party	Before	After	Change
Republican	21	21	Steady
Democratic	8	8	Steady
Total	29	29	

Utah House of Representatives
Party	Before	After	Change
Republican	56	55	▼1
Democratic	19	20	▲1
Total	75	75	

=== Vermont ===
All of the seats of the Vermont Legislature were up for election. Democrats maintained control of both state legislative chambers.

Vermont Senate
Party	Before	After	Change
Democratic	21	23	▲2
Republican	9	7	▼2
Total	30	30	

Vermont House of Representatives
Party	Before	After	Change
Democratic	83	93	▲10
Republican	60	49	▼11
Progressive	6	6	Steady
Independent	1	2	▲1
Total	150	150	

=== Washington ===
All of the seats of the Washington House of Representatives and half of the Washington Senate were up for election. Democrats maintained control of both legislative chambers.

Washington State Senate
Party	Before	After	Change
Democratic	26	32	▲6
Republican	23	17	▼6
Total	49	49	

Washington House of Representatives
Party	Before	After	Change
Democratic	56	62	▲6
Republican	42	36	▼6
Total	98	98	

=== West Virginia ===
All of the seats of the West Virginia House of Delegates and half of the West Virginia Senate were up for election. Democrats maintained control of both state legislative chambers.

West Virginia Senate
Party	Before	After	Change
Democratic	21	23	▲2
Republican	13	11	▼2
Total	34	34	

West Virginia House of Delegates
Party	Before	After	Change
Democratic	68	72	▲4
Republican	32	28	▼4
Total	100	100	

=== Wisconsin ===
All of the seats of the Wisconsin Assembly and half of the Wisconsin Senate were up for election. Democrats won control of the Senate while Republicans maintained control of the Assembly.

Wisconsin Senate
Party	Before	After	Change
Democratic	14	18	▲4
Republican	19	15	▼4
Total	33	33	

Wisconsin State Assembly
Party	Before	After	Change
Republican	60	52	▼8
Democratic	39	47	▲8
Total	99	99	

=== Wyoming ===
All of the seats of the Wyoming House of Representatives and half of the Wyoming Senate were up for election. Republicans maintained control of both state legislative chambers.

Wyoming Senate
Party	Before	After	Change
Republican	23	23	Steady
Democratic	7	7	Steady
Total	30	30	

Wyoming House of Representatives
Party	Before	After	Change
Republican	46	43	▼3
Democratic	14	17	▲3
Total	60	60	

== Territorial and federal district summaries ==
=== American Samoa ===
All of the seats of the American Samoa Senate and the American Samoa House of Representatives were up for election. Members of the Senate serve four-year terms, while members of the House of Representatives serve two-year terms. Gubernatorial and legislative elections are conducted on a nonpartisan basis in American Samoa.

=== Guam ===
All of the seats of the unicameral Legislature of Guam were up for election. All members of the legislature serve a two-year term. Republicans retained control of the legislature.

Guam Legislature
Party	Before	After	Change
Democratic	6	7	▲1
Republican	9	8	▼1
Total	15	15	

=== U.S. Virgin Islands ===
All of the seats of the unicameral Legislature of the Virgin Islands were up for election. All members of the legislature serve a two-year term. Democrats won control of the newly created legislature.

Virgin Islands Legislature
Party	Results
Democratic	9
Independent	6
Total	15

=== Washington, D.C. ===
The Council of the District of Columbia serves as the legislative branch of the federal district of Washington, D.C. Half of the council seats are up for election. Council members serve four-year terms. Democrats retained supermajority control of the council.

District of Columbia Council
Party	Before	After	Change
Democratic	11	11	Steady
Republican	1	1	Steady
Independent	1	1	Steady
Total	13	13	
