= 2000 United States redistricting cycle =

The 2000 United States redistricting cycle took place following the completion of the 2000 United States census. In all fifty states, various bodies re-drew state legislative and congressional districts. States that are apportioned more than one seat in the United States House of Representatives also drew new districts for that legislative body. The resulting new districts were first implemented for the 2001 and 2002 elections, which saw Republicans add eight seats to their U.S. House majority, capture eight state legislative chambers and win a majority of state legislative seats for the first time in half a century.

The districts drawn in the 2000 redistricting cycle remained in effect until the next round of redistricting following the 2010 United States census.

== Reapportionment ==

Following the 2000 census, Texas, Florida, Arizona and Georgia each gained two seats, while California, North Carolina, Colorado and Nevada picked up one new seat apiece. New York and Pennsylvania both lost two seats, while Connecticut, Michigan, Illinois, Wisconsin, Indiana, Ohio, Oklahoma and Mississippi each lost one seat.

=== Newly created districts and eliminated districts ===
The new seats were first contested in the 2002 United States House of Representatives elections.

Eliminated districts	Created districts
Connecticut 6; Illinois 20; Indiana 10; Michigan 16; Mississippi 5; New York 30; New York 31; Ohio 19; Oklahoma 6; Pennsylvania 20; Pennsylvania 21; Wisconsin 9	Arizona 7; Arizona 8; California 53; Colorado 7; Florida 24; Florida 25; Georgia 12; Georgia 13; Nevada 3; North Carolina 13; Texas 31; Texas 32

== Means of redistricting ==
Most states were redistricted by joint committees of state legislatures, with twelve states having set up either citizen-ran or politically appointed commissions to redraw legislative maps and six states having set up commissions for congressional maps.

== Subsequent mid-decade redistricting ==
=== Texas ===
In 2002, Republicans gained control of the Texas Legislature for the first time in 130 years, and despite a gain of two seats from the court-ran redraw of the Texas congressional map in 2001, set about to redraw the congressional map for the state to increase Republican gains from a narrow 17D-15R deficit. It led to a protracted standoff between the Democratic and Republican legislative caucuses which ended with the defeat of the Democratic caucus' quorum-busting attempt and the creation of new congressional maps which saw Republicans gain the majority of congressional districts in Texas for the first time since Reconstruction.

=== Georgia ===
After Democrats in the Georgia General Assembly drew legislative and congressional maps which protected against further losses, Republicans sued against the maps on Voting Rights Act grounds. Following the 2004 election, which saw Republicans gain a majority in both houses for the first time in Georgia history, redrew legislative and congressional maps in 2004 after federal judges struck down both maps which were drawn by the 146th legislature as violating the one person, one vote guarantee of the U.S. Constitution, resulting in a reshuffling of districts which took effect in the next legislature which shored up Republican gains in both chambers and in Congress.
