= 2009 United States state legislative elections =

- November 2, 2009

2 legislative chambers 2 states
	Majority party	Minority party	Third party
Party	Democratic	Republican	Coalition
Chambers before	61	37	1 (Note: The Alaska Senate was controlled by a coalition of Democrats and Republicans. The minority caucus consists of Republicans who were not part of the majority coalition.)
Chambers after	61	37	1
Overall change	Steady	Steady	Steady
- Map of lower house elections: Democrats retained control Republicans retained control No regularly-scheduled elections

The 2009 United States state legislative elections were held on November 3, 2009. Two legislative chambers in two states held regularly scheduled elections. These off-year elections coincided with other state and local elections, including gubernatorial elections in two states. Both chambers of the Northern Mariana Islands legislature were up, which remains the last time they were up in this class of elections.

Democrats maintained control of the lower house of the New Jersey legislature, and Republicans did so in the lower chamber in Virginia.

== Summary table ==
Regularly scheduled elections were held in 2 of the 99 state legislative chambers in the United States. Nationwide, regularly scheduled elections were held for 180 of the 7,383 legislative seats. This table only covers regularly scheduled elections; additional special elections took place concurrently with these regularly scheduled elections.

State	Upper House				Lower House			
State	Seats up	Total	% up	Term	Seats up	Total	% up	Term
New Jersey	0	40	0	2/4 (Note: The upper houses of Arkansas, Delaware, Florida, Hawaii, Illinois, Minnesota, New Jersey, and Texas use a 2-4-4 term length system.)	80	80	100	4
Virginia	0	40	0	4	100	100	100	2

== State summaries ==
=== New Jersey ===
All seats of the New Jersey General Assembly were up for election. Assembly members were elected to two-year terms in two-member districts. Democrats retained majority control, albeit a slightly reduced one.

General Assembly
Party	Before	After	Change
Democratic	48	47	▼1
Republican	31	32	▲1
Total		80	80

=== Virginia ===
All seats of the Virginia House of Delegates are up for election. Delegates are elected to two-year terms in single-member districts. Republicans expanded their majority.

House of Delegates
Party	Before	After	Change
Republican	53	59	▲6
Democratic	45	39	▼6
Independents	2	2	Steady
Total		100	100

== Territorial summaries ==
=== Northern Mariana Islands ===
All seats of the Northern Mariana Islands House of Representatives and half of the Northern Mariana Islands Senate are up for election. Senators are elected to four-year terms and Representatives are elected to two-year terms.

House of Representatives
Party	Before	After	Change
Republican	12	9	▼3
Democratic	1	0	▼1
Independents	3	4	▲1
Covenant Party	4	7	▲3
Total		20	20

Senate
Party	Before	After	Change
Republican	3	5	▲2
Coalition	6	0	▼6
Independents	0	4	▲4
Total		9	9

== Special elections ==
=== New Jersey ===
District		Incumbent			This race	
Chamber	No.	Representative	Party	First elected	Results	Candidates
Senate	6	James Beach	Democratic	2009 (appointed)	Incumbent appointed January 3, 2009, upon resignation of predecessor. Incumbent elected to finish term November 3, 2009. Democratic hold.	▌ ✓ James Beach (Democratic) 58.1%; ▌Joseph Adolf (Republican) 41.9%
Senate	23	Marcia A. Karrow	Republican	2009 (appointed)	Incumbent appointed February 8, 2009. Incumbent retired. Republican hold.	▌ ✓ Michael J. Doherty (Republican) 72.0%; ▌ Harvey Baron (Democratic) 28.0%

== See also ==
- 2009 United States gubernatorial elections
