= Party switching in the United States =

Change of political affiliation

In politics of the United States, party switching is any change in party affiliation of a partisan public figure, usually one who holds an elected office. Use of the term "party switch" can also connote a transfer of holding power in an elected governmental body from one party to another. According to a 2017 study published by the Voter Study Group, 13 percent of Democrats and Republicans had switched their party affiliation over a five year timeframe. Of those, the most likely demographics to leave the Republican Party included people of color and those under 45, whereas non-college-educated white voters over the age of 45 were the most likely to leave the Democratic Party.

== History ==
=== 19th century ===
The first two major parties in the United States were the Federalist Party and the Democratic-Republican Party. The Federalists experienced success in the 1790s but lost power in the 1800 elections and collapsed after the War of 1812. Many former Federalists, including John Quincy Adams, became members of the Democratic-Republican Party. After the 1824 presidential election, the Democratic-Republicans fractured between supporters of Adams and supporters of Andrew Jackson. Jackson's followers formed the Democratic Party, while those who supported Adams formed the National Republican Party. Two short-lived but significant third parties, the Anti-Masonic Party and the Nullifier Party, also arose during this period. In the 1830s, opponents of Jackson coalesced into the Whig Party.

The United States experienced another period of political realignment in the 1850s. The Whigs collapsed as a national party due to sectional tensions regarding slavery. The Republican Party and the American Party both sought to succeed the Whigs as the main opposition to the Democratic Party, and the Republicans eventually became the most popular party in the Northern United States. The Republicans absorbed many Northern Whigs, as well as some anti-slavery Democrats and much of the Free Soil Party. Notable Whigs who joined the Republican Party include Abraham Lincoln and William Seward, while notable Democrats who joined the Republican Party include Hannibal Hamlin and Galusha A. Grow. Many Southern Whigs became Democrats, though some formed the Constitutional Union Party to contest the 1860 presidential election. During the Reconstruction Era that followed the American Civil War, many Republicans and African Americans held office in the South. Republicans dissatisfied with Radical Republican President Ulysses S. Grant formed the Liberal Republican Party for the 1872 presidential election, and many of these Liberal Republicans later joined the Democratic Party. After the end of Reconstruction the Republican Party generally dominated the North, while a resurgent Democratic Party dominated the South.

By the late 19th century, as the Democratic and Republican parties became more established, party switching became less frequent. Nonetheless major conflicts in both major parties occurred in the 1890s, largely over the issue of monetary policy, and Republican supporters of free silver formed the Silver Republican Party. Many of these, including Henry M. Teller and Fred Dubois, later joined the Democratic Party.

=== 20th century ===
Following Theodore Roosevelt's loss to William Howard Taft in the 1912 Republican Party presidential primaries, Roosevelt and his followers broke off from the Republican party to form the Bull Moose Party. Wisconsin senator Robert M. La Follette also launched a presidential bid under the Progressive Party in 1924 after both the Republican Party and Democratic Party nominated conservative candidates. A period of realignment commenced following the onset of the Great Depression, as President Franklin D. Roosevelt constructed the successful New Deal coalition. Over the ensuing decades, Roosevelt's Democrats embraced several tenets of modern American liberalism, while the Republican Party tended to favor conservatism.

The transition into today's Democratic Party was cemented in 1948, when Harry Truman introduced a pro-civil rights platform and, in response, many Democrats walked out and formed the Dixiecrats. Most rejoined the Democrats over the next decade, but in the 1960s, Lyndon Johnson passed the Civil Rights Act and Voting Rights Act. The civil rights movement had also deepened existing racial tensions in much of the Southern United States, and Republican politicians developed strategies that successfully contributed to the political realignment of many white, conservative voters in the South who had traditionally supported the Democratic Party rather than the Republican Party. These approaches are known as the Southern strategy. Anti-civil rights members left the Democratic Party in droves, and Senator Strom Thurmond, the Dixiecrats' presidential candidate from 1948, joined the Republican Party.

== Notable party switchers ==
Liberal Republican Robert M. La Follette ran for president as the candidate of the Progressive Party in 1924, while remaining a Republican in the Senate. There have also been several instances of politicians continuing to be a member of a political party while running other campaigns as an independent. The most prominent examples include southern Democratic segregationists Strom Thurmond in 1948 and George Wallace in 1968, who remained in the Democratic Party for statewide campaigns but mounted national presidential campaigns as independents. Wallace later ran in the 1972 Democratic primaries. Senator Joseph Lieberman in 2006 ran for Senate in Connecticut under the party Connecticut for Lieberman, although still identifying as a Democrat.

Other political figures, such as Ed Koch, Jim Leach, Zell Miller, Colin Powell, did not formally leave their parties, but supported a candidate from another party. Miller and Koch, though Democrats, supported Republican George W. Bush's 2004 reelection campaign, while Powell and Leach supported Barack Obama's 2008 presidential campaign. This received much media attention in 2004, when Democrats for Bush and Republicans for Kerry groups were formed. In New Hampshire, former Republican Governor Walter Peterson has expressly supported Democrat John Lynch in his bids for governor. In Virginia, the state's first Republican governor since Reconstruction, Linwood Holton, has since 2001 frequently supported Democrats in statewide races – his son-in-law, Tim Kaine, has been elected to the governorship and the U.S. Senate in that time, and served as chairman of the Democratic National Committee and the Democratic Party's nominee for Vice President in the 2016 election – and endorsed Barack Obama in 2008. Similarly, in 1860, former Democratic President Martin Van Buren ended up supporting Abraham Lincoln due to Van Buren's disagreements with Democratic policies on secession. Other examples include former Republican Senator from Minnesota David Durenberger supporting John Kerry in 2004 and former Democratic Attorney General Griffin Bell supporting George W. Bush in 2004. Moreover, former U.S. Secretary of Agriculture and Democrat Mike Espy endorsed incumbent Republican Governor of Mississippi Haley Barbour for reelection in 2007.

During Donald Trump's presidency one governor and two congressmen switched parties due mostly to their support or opposition to the president's policies. On August 3, 2017, West Virginia Governor Jim Justice announced that he had rejoined the Republican Party after having been elected as a Democrat less than a year prior. He made the announcement at a rally in Huntington alongside Trump and claimed that he was returning to the GOP because he could not help the president while he was a Democrat. The announcement came as a surprise even to his own staff. This also made Justice the first Republican governor of West Virginia since Cecil Underwood in 2001. In 2019, Democratic congressman Jeff Van Drew left the party because of his opposition to Trump's first impeachment and his own political beliefs. Both Justice and Van Drew were reelected as Republicans in 2020. Conversely, Republican congressman Justin Amash of Michigan left the GOP to become an independent on July 4, 2019, due to his opposition to Trump. Amash joined the Libertarian Party in 2020 and did not seek reelection, rejoining the Republican Party four years later.

== Motivations ==
Politicians may switch parties if they believe their views are no longer aligned with those of their current party. Richard Shelby of Alabama left the Democratic Party for the Republican Party, arguing that his former party had shifted more towards liberalism. Ben Nighthorse Campbell of Colorado switched parties from Democratic to Republican following increased hostility within the Democratic Party in Colorado over Campbell's increased conservative voting record and independent streak while the local party became more liberal.

Some politicians have also switched parties to improve their chances for reelection. Arlen Specter, a former US Senator of Pennsylvania, cited his uncertainty of winning a Republican primary as one reason for his move to the Democratic Party.

== See also ==
- Crossover voting
- Democrat in name only
- List of American politicians who switched parties in office
- List of United States representatives who switched parties
- List of United States senators who switched parties
- People United Means Action
- Red states and blue states
- Republican in name only
- Southern strategy
