= Robert Peters (Georgia politician) =

American politician

Robert G. Peters

Member of the Georgia House of Representatives from the 2nd district
- In office January 13, 1969 – January 9, 1989
- Preceded by: Bert Ward
- Succeeded by: McCracken Poston

Personal details
- Born: Robert Glenn Peters; March 7, 1925 Ringgold, Georgia, U.S.
- Died: May 23, 1999 (aged 74) Ringgold, Georgia, U.S.
- Party: Democratic
- Spouse: Nellie McBride (m. 1942)
- Children: 3

Military service
- Allegiance: United States
- Branch/service: United States Army
- Years of service: 1943–1946
- Battles/wars: World War II

Robert Glenn Peters (March 7, 1925 – May 23, 1999) was an American politician in the state of Georgia. Peters served in the Georgia House of Representatives as a member of the Democratic Party from 1969 until 1989, representing parts of Catoosa County.

== Early life ==
Peters was born in Ringgold, Georgia, and graduated from Ringgold High School. In December 1943, Peters joined the United States Army and served in the Pacific theater of World War II. After leaving the Army, he entered the glass business, and by 1949 was the president of the Broadway Glass Company in nearby Chattanooga, Tennessee.

== Political career ==
Elected to the Georgia House of Representatives in 1968, Peters served in the chamber for two decades. During his final four years in office, he served as chairman of the House's powerful Legislative & Congressional Reapportionment Committee, which has authority over Georgia's redistricting process. In 1988, Peters was defeated in the Democratic primary election for his seat by McCracken Poston, marking the end of his political career.

== Death ==
A lifelong Baptist, he died in his hometown of Ringgold, Georgia, in 1999 at the age of 74.
