= McCracken Poston =

American lawyer and politician

Member of the Georgia House of Representatives
- In office January 1989 – January 1997
- Preceded by: Robert G. Peters
- Succeeded by: William H. H. Clark
- Constituency: 2nd district (1989–1993); 3rd district (1993–1997)

Personal details
- Born: McCracken King Poston Jr. October 24, 1959 (age 66) Fort Oglethorpe, Georgia, U.S.
- Party: Democratic
- Spouse: Reva Revis 1990 –1996; Alison Vaughn 1998 –2009
- Education: University of Tennessee at Chattanooga (BA); University of Georgia (JD)
- Nickname: "Ken" Poston

McCracken King Poston Jr. (also known as McCracken Poston or "Ken" Poston; born October 24, 1959), is an American criminal defense attorney and part-time juvenile court judge. He gained national attention for several notable cases which were featured on TV series specials such as CNN Presents, Dateline NBC, A&E's American Justice and Forensic Files. Poston is a practicing defense attorney in Georgia and Tennessee. Poston was elected and served as a state representative in the Georgia House of Representatives from 1989 to 1997. In 2024, Poston's account of his representation of Alvin Ridley in the 1999 murder trial (where Ridley was accused of imprisoning his wife for decades before killing her) was published by Citadel Books (Kensington Publishing), titled "Zenith Man: Death, Love, and Redemption in a Georgia Courtroom."

== Early life and education ==
McCracken Poston was born and raised in Northwest Georgia. After attending public schools in Catoosa County, Poston attended the University of Tennessee at Chattanooga for his undergraduate studies, and then he went on to receive his J.D. degree from the University of Georgia Law School where he was president of his class.

== Career ==
Poston is a former Democratic state representative. Previously, Poston was an assistant district attorney for Lookout Mountain Judicial Circuit and the former president of Catoosa Country Chamber of Commerce. He was also an adjunct professor of American government at University of Tennessee-Chattanooga.

Poston is an active juvenile court judge and practices criminal law.

=== Political career ===
In 1988, Poston was elected to the Georgia House of Representatives from a district in Catoosa County where remained for a tenure of eight years. During his term, Poston was a member of the Defense and Veterans Affairs, Education, and Judiciary committees. After four terms, Poston left the state legislature and ran for the United States Congress as the Democratic nominee in the 9th district. He was defeated in the general election by incumbent Republican Nathan Deal, a former Democrat and former state house speaker with whom he had served in the state house from 1989 to 1993. Poston even lost his own state house district, which covered part of the congressional district's northwest portion. To date, Poston is the last reasonably well-financed Democrat to run in the district, and one of only two Democrats to manage even 30 percent of the vote since Deal switched parties.

=== Legal career ===
In 1984 he interned in the office of Congressman George Darden. From 1985 to 1986 and from 1988 to 1989 he was in private practice. From 1986 to 1988 he was an assistant district attorney in the Lookout Mountain Judicial Circuit District Attorney's Office. Poston started a solo law firm in 1989 after briefly working for the Offices of Clifton Patty, and he has served as a juvenile court judge since 1997.

Throughout his career, Poston has had several high-profile cases, including the following:

==== Alvin Ridley ====
Poston represented Alvin "The Zenith Man" Ridley in an eight-day trial in January 1999. Ridley's wife, Virginia, had been found dead in their home after not being seen in public for nearly three decades. Virginia Gail Ridley (née Hickey) (April 18, 1948 – October 4, 1997) was a woman who lived with her husband on the outskirts of Ringgold, Georgia, in a dilapidated, cockroach-infested house—though, according to Ridley's lawyer, they made an effort to keep the house clean. Virginia's family claimed Alvin prevented all attempts by them to contact her. Eight months after her death, Ridley was arrested and later charged with murder, but claimed his epileptic wife died in her sleep. Ridley claimed that no one in Ringgold knew of her condition because of her family's opposition to their marriage, as well as Virginia's fear she would have a seizure in public, and therefore, she decided to live as a recluse. Ridley maintained he and Virginia were happy and he never harmed her. He shared with Poston Virginia's journal, an evidentiary treasure trove consisting of 10,000 pages written over three decades. During the trial, Poston presented the courtroom with hundreds of notes and scraps of paper that Virginia journaled on about their reclusive life together. After the testimony of defense witness Dr. Braxton Wannamaker, an expert on seizure disorders, and the lack of a motive from the prosecution, the jury acquitted Ridley of all charges.

The case was featured on the A&E network series American Justice episode "Death in a Small Town", as well as episodes of Extra and Forensic Files. The radio storytelling program Snap Judgment had Poston explaining how he defended Ridley and discovered Virginia's documents in the episode "Dirty Work" on November 27, 2015.

Her writings reflected a happy marriage, with details of meals and TV programs the couple enjoyed. She wrote prayers and observations from her Bible study, along with a never-submitted script for Unsolved Mysteries. Attorney Poston theorized that Virginia—who suffered from agoraphobia and epilepsy—died of an epileptic seizure as had Florence Griffith-Joyner, whose autopsy he submitted as evidence. He argued that her hypergraphia could be part of her epileptic condition. The prosecution maintained that Ridley suffocated her, citing his strange, seemingly unemotional behavior upon reporting Virginia's death and speaking about her to others.

Poston wrote a book about the case, "Zenith Man: Death, Love, and Redemption in a Georgia Courtroom", published by Citadel Books, an imprint of Kensington Publishing.

==== Byron "Low Tax" Looper ====
Poston represented Byron "Low Tax" Looper in the Cumberland County case of the murder of Tennessee State Senator Tommy Burks in 1998. Looper was the local tax assessor in neighboring Putnam County who had won his position after changing his middle name from "Anthony" to "Low Tax." Looper was challenging the incumbent Senator Burks (D-Monterey), until Burks was found shot to death on his farm just days before the election. A write-in campaign elected the Senator's wife, Charlotte Burks, to the seat. Looper was attested to be an atrociously obnoxious and difficult client by the six previous attorneys who had attempted to represent him. When the judge lost patience from the slew of delays, Looper was finally represented through trial by Poston and Ron Cordova of California. Looper was convicted of the murder of Senator Burks in 2000, and received a life without parole sentence. Looper was found dead in his prison cell in 2013, a death that Poston has cited as "suspicious". The case was featured on episodes of American Justice ('Eliminating the Competition') and Primetime Thursday ('The Last Campaign').

==== The Tri-State Crematory Case ====
In 2002, Poston represented Ray Brent Marsh of the Tri-State Crematory who had been charged with two counts theft by deception for each body that was identified on his property in Noble, Georgia. 334 bodies and remains of the deceased had been discovered at the Tri-State Crematory, a family-owned business that Marsh had been managing after his father's health failed. Marsh was charged with 787 felony counts, amounting to a possible sentence of thousands of years in prison. Poston put forth an aggressive defense for Marsh, threatening to require Walker County to conduct and pay for a costly trial that could potentially take months, and was partially successful in a change of venue effort in securing that the jury would be acquired from out of the area, which would have added great additional cost to Walker County. Poston also attacked the theories of prosecution that the state was utilizing, questioning how a human body could be the subject of a "fiduciary" relationship, and how a dead human body could be given the requisite monetary value to ascertain whether each body represented a misdemeanor or felony. The Georgia Supreme Court agreed with Poston of the need to clarify these issues and certified the questions for pre-trial appeal. After the high court ruling, Poston was able to arrange for Marsh to accept a plea deal of a 12-year sentence in prison, with eligibility for parole. The case appeared on an episode of Crossfire ('Should government increase regulations on funeral').

==== Operation "Meth Merchant" ====
Poston represented a number of South Asian-born defendants and revealed many problems inherent in Operation "Meth Merchant"—a joint Federal and state task force targeting South Asian owned and operated convenience stores in Northwest Georgia. An operative would attempt to purchase pseudoephedrine from the stores while uttering something that the government alleged informed the clerks that the operative intended to manufacture methamphetamine with the pseudoephedrine. Poston attacked the scheme, pointing out that many of the clerks do not understand English sufficiently to ascertain what the operative was talking about. Furthermore, Poston began to attack the method of the task force in identifying the clerks, which was a scanning of license plates and acquisition of registration and drivers licenses of the owners of the cars, followed by presenting the license photos to the operative to identify the suspects.

Poston filed a number of "Alibi" notices in the United States District Court for the Northern District of Georgia in his cases. Poston was able to prove the operation's methods were so faulty that there were three of his clients misidentified by the government operative. Poston proved that one of his clients was picking up her child from daycare several miles away in another state when the government claimed she was selling the operative pseudoephedrine. On another client Poston proved that the man was in India when the government said he was in Fort Oglethorpe, Georgia. Finally, for another young client arrested upon the return from his honeymoon Poston was able to prove he was working in a Subway sandwich shop on Long Island, New York when the government said he was in North Georgia, "knowingly" selling pseudoephedrine for use in the manufacture of methamphetamine. The case was detailed and featured on an episode of Asia Today ('Meth Persecutions of Indians in Georgia').

==== Judge Bryant Cochran judicial corruption case ====
In July 2012, Poston undertook assisting a woman from Murray County, Georgia, in filing a complaint against Murray County Chief Magistrate Judge Bryant Cochran. The woman charged that when she was in the Judge's office in April, 2012, the elected Chief Magistrate solicited a sexual relationship from her that he told her would result a "good outcome" in a criminal case the woman was seeking to initiate against three assailants that had attacked her on Easter Sunday, 2012. The woman did not comply with the requests for the sexual relationship, but had a brief texting relationship with the judge, and sent him one photo of herself in her underwear, at the judge's request.

The Georgia Judicial Qualifications Commission (JQC) started to investigate the judge, after meeting the woman in Poston's office, and in the course of the investigation also found a stack of pre-signed search warrant blanks in the Magistrate Court Office. These were pre-signed warrants that the judge had left in the court's office for law enforcement to pick up and use if he was not in. This not only violated the law, but destroyed the notion of a "neutral and detached magistrate" – making the requisite finding of probable cause to issue such warrants a rubber stamp of law enforcement.

While Judge Cochran won the 2012 reelection handily during the investigation, the discovery of the pre-signed warrants started speculation that the Chief Magistrate would step down. Before this happened, however, Poston's client was stopped in her car at night near her home by a Murray County deputy, who was almost immediately joined by his Sergeant, the judge's cousin. When the first officer's drug dog failed to signal the presence of any illegal drugs, the officers turned off their lapel microphones and called the embattled Chief Magistrate Judge. Just after the call, one of the officers walked directly to a certain spot and reached under the car. A magnetized tin-box was found under the woman's car containing methamphetamine.

In her first court appearance, Poston represented the woman and challenged the arrest in open court, and convinced the District Attorney's office to invite the Georgia Bureau of Investigation and the Federal Bureau of Investigation to look into Poston's allegations that the drugs had been planted at the behest of Chief Magistrate Judge Cochran. Cochran resigned from office the following day, insisting that his resignation was "only" due to the pre-signed warrants issue.

Poston and his client worked closely with the GBI and FBI and quickly provided them a suspect who later admitted planting the methamphetamine on his client's car. He was a tenant and handyman of Judge Cochran. Poston was joined in the effort by Chattanooga attorney Stuart James, who filed a civil suit on behalf of their client. After three years, and with an intervening second arrest of his client, all known conspirators were brought to justice in federal criminal proceedings. The civilian who planted the drugs and the two officers first on the scene who found the drugs pleaded guilty in the United States District Court for the Northern District of Georgia for their roles in the set-up of Poston's client. Poston had publicly stated that his client was a methamphetamine addict, which made her the more vulnerable to the set-up, and that the second arrest - although ostensibly legitimate - was a desperate attempt to again discredit his client, this time just weeks before Cochran's trial. The subsequent arrest ultimately made his client a better witness for the government, having made her realize the issues that she had that made her vulnerable to the Judge. Former Chief Magistrate Bryant Cochran was tried in the same court in December, 2014 and found guilty of all charges. He was sentenced in 2015 to a five-year sentence.
