= 2011 Ringgold–Apison tornado =

EF4 tornado in Georgia and Tennessee, U.S.

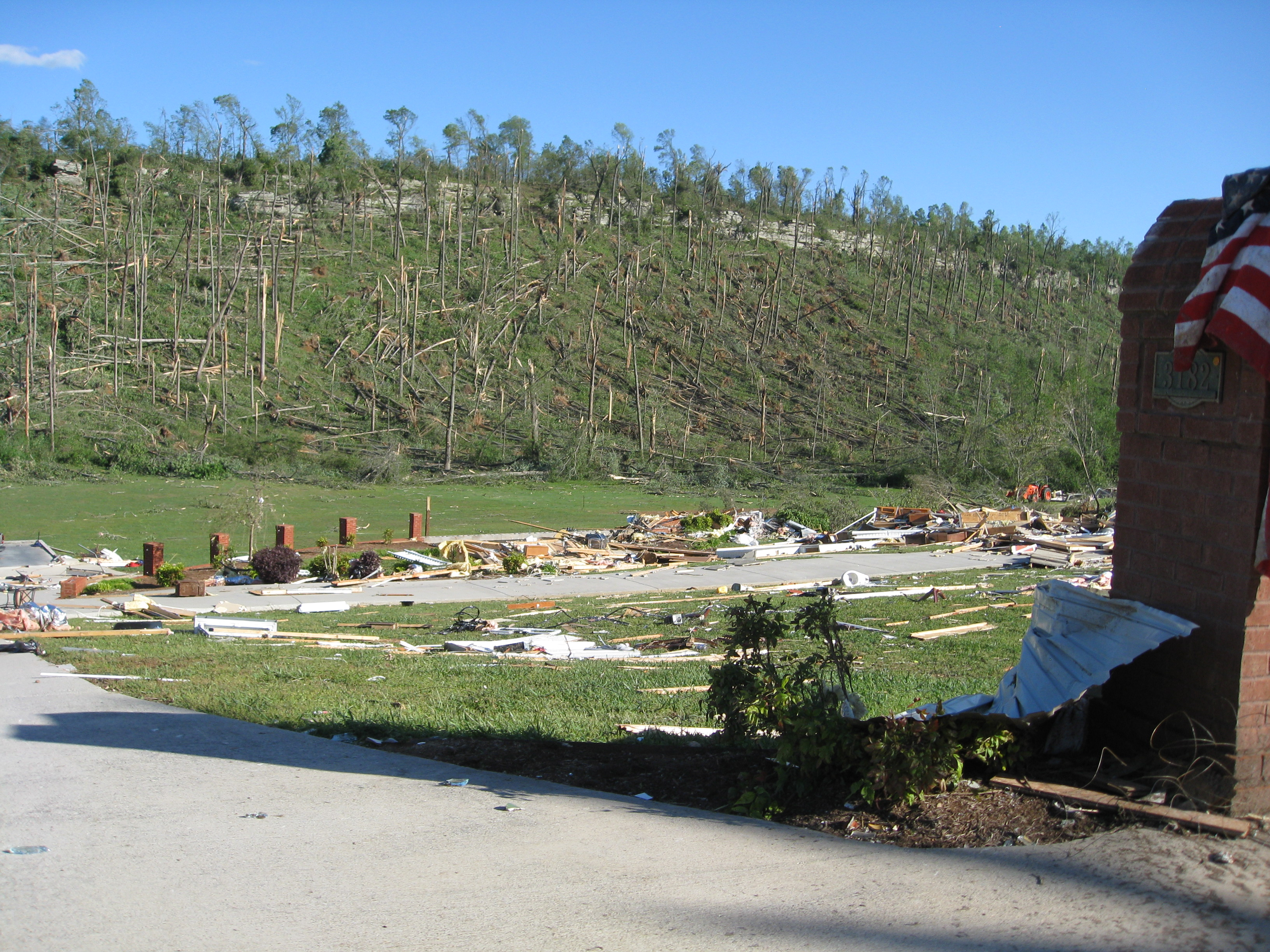
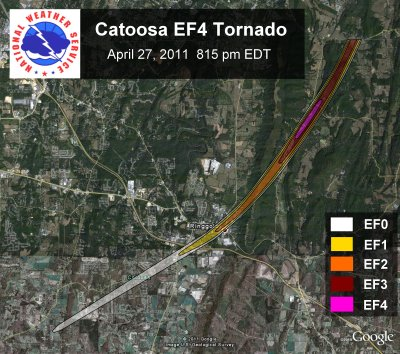
- Clockwise from top: A CCTV still of the tornado near Ringgold; track map of the Ringgold portion of the tornado; EF4-rated damage to a home along Cherokee Valley Road northeast of Ringgold, Georgia

Meteorological history
- Formed: April 27, 2011, 8:15 p.m. EDT (UTC−04:00)
- Dissipated: April 27, 2011, 9:07 p.m. EDT (UTC−04:00)
- Duration: 52 minutes

EF4 tornado
- on the Enhanced Fujita scale
- Path length: 54.75 miles (88.11 km)
- Highest winds: 190 mph (310 km/h)

Overall effects
- Fatalities: 20 (including 1 indirect) (Note: An unborn infant was killed in the tornado, although it is not counted as a direct death.)
- Injuries: 335
- Economic losses: >$88 million (2024 USD)
- Areas affected: Catoosa County in Georgia and Hamilton, Bradley, Polk and McMinn counties in Tennessee
- Part of the 2011 Super Outbreak and Tornadoes of 2011

In the evening hours of April 27, 2011, a violent and long-tracked multi-vortex tornado impacted several communities along a 54.75 miles (88.11 km) path through northern Georgia and southeast Tennessee, including Ringgold, Georgia, Apison, Tennessee, and Cleveland, Tennessee. The tornado, which was on the ground for 52 minutes and became known as the Ringgold–Apison tornado or The Monster, killed over twenty people while having windspeeds that were estimated to have been as high as 190 miles per hour (310 km/h). The tornado was part of the largest outbreak of tornadoes in recorded history, and was the deadliest to hit Georgia during the outbreak.

The tornado touched down in rural Catoosa County, Georgia, near Rock Spring, where it slowly intensified and damaged trees before crossing Jackson Lake and entering into Ringgold, where it damaged several commercial buildings and later residential homes. Nine people were killed in Ringgold as the tornado devastated the town at EF3 intensity, and hundreds of buildings were destroyed before the tornado crossed into Hamilton County, Tennessee, before impacting Apison, where eight people were killed and EF4 damage was inflicted to several homes.

== Meteorological synopsis ==
=== Setup ===
The environmental conditions leading up to the 2011 Super Outbreak were among the "most conducive to violent tornadoes ever documented". On April 25, a vigorous upper-level shortwave trough moved into the Southern Plains states. Ample instability, low-level moisture, and wind shear all fueled a significant tornado outbreak from Texas to Tennessee; at least 64 tornadoes touched down on this day. An area of low pressure consolidated over Texas on April 26 and traveled east while the aforementioned shortwave trough traversed the Mississippi and Ohio River valleys. Another 50 tornadoes touched down on this day. The multi-day outbreak culminated on April 27 with the most violent day of tornadic activity since the 1974 Super Outbreak. Multiple episodes of tornadic activity ensued with two waves of mesoscale convective systems in the morning hours followed by a widespread outbreak of supercells from Mississippi to North Carolina during the afternoon into the evening.

Tornadic activity on April 27 was precipitated by a 995 mbar (hPa; 29.39 inHg) surface low situated over Kentucky and a deep, negatively tilted (aligned northwest to southeast) trough over Arkansas and Louisiana. A strong southwesterly surface jet intersected these systems at a 60° angle, an ageostrophic flow that led to storm-relative helicity values in excess of 500 m^{2}s^{−2}—indicative of extreme wind shear and a very high potential for rotating updrafts within supercells. Ample moisture from the Gulf of Mexico was brought north across the Deep South, leading to daytime high temperatures of 77 to 81 °F (25 to 27 °C) and dewpoints of 66 to 72 °F (19 to 22 °C). Furthermore, convective available potential energy (CAPE) values reached 2,500–3,000 J/kg^{−1}.

=== Forecast ===
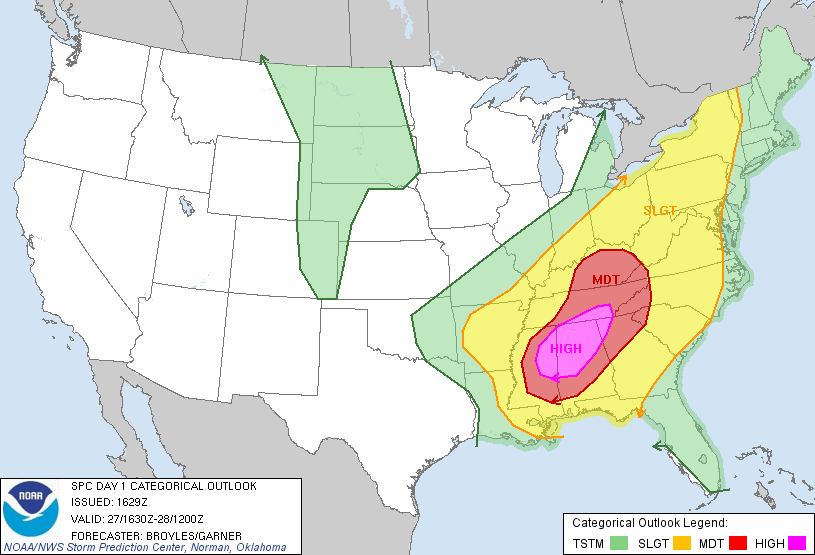
The National Weather Service Storm Prediction Center's Day 1 Convective Outlook for April 27, showing the Categorical Graphic

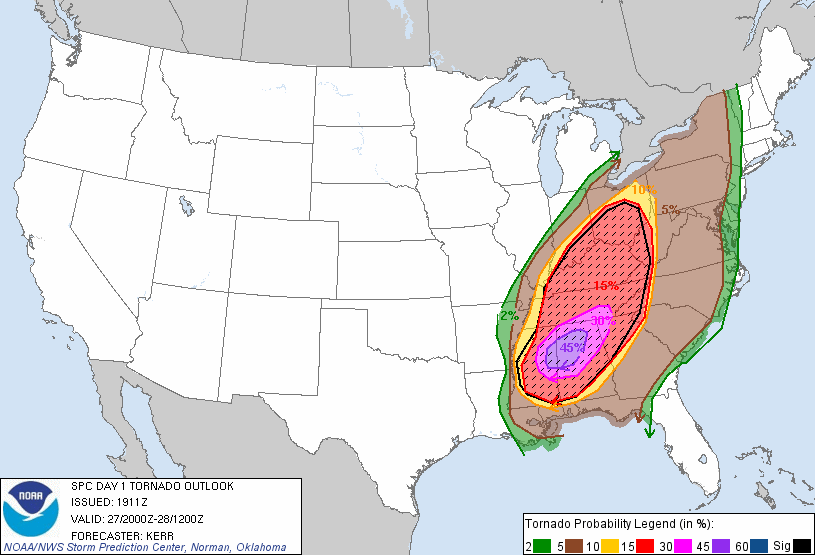
The probability of a tornado within 25 miles of a point (cross-hatched area: 10% or greater probability of EF2+ tornadoes)

On the morning of April 27, a strong cold front with several areas of embedded low pressure extended from the Texas Hill Country northeastward towards the Arklatex and the Ozarks, and later into the lower Ohio Valley. Warm moist air was in place due to strong southerly flow ahead of the front over Mississippi, Alabama, and Tennessee. An upper level disturbance sparked a broad area of showers and thunderstorms as it moved across the frontal boundary on the previous evening. The eastern edge of the line of showers and storms continued to move eastward, in concert with the upper disturbance, reaching the northwest Alabama border around 2:00 a.m. CDT.

This produced the last and most violent round of severe weather, which began around 2:30 p.m. CDT for northern Alabama as supercells began to line up to the southwest of the area. During the early afternoon hours, the potential for destructive tornadoes was highlighted by the Storm Prediction Center's upgrade to a high risk for severe weather around 1:00 p.m. CDT. This prompted a particularly dangerous situation (PDS) tornado watch, which was issued for northern Alabama and portions of southern Tennessee at 1:45 p.m. CDT. The bulletin that accompanied the watch read:

THE NWS STORM PREDICTION CENTER HAS ISSUED A TORNADO WATCH FOR PORTIONS OF: MUCH OF ALABAMA, NORTHWEST GEORGIA, SOUTHEAST MISSISSIPPI, SOUTHERN MIDDLE TENNESSEE, EFFECTIVE THIS WEDNESDAY AFTERNOON AND EVENING FROM 145 PM UNTIL 1000 PM CDT.

...THIS IS A PARTICULARLY DANGEROUS SITUATION...

DESTRUCTIVE TORNADOES...LARGE HAIL TO 4 INCHES IN DIAMETER. THUNDERSTORM WIND GUSTS TO 80 MPH...AND DANGEROUS LIGHTNING ARE POSSIBLE IN THESE AREAS.

The potential for tornadoes ramped up from noon through 9:00 p.m. CDT. Tornadoes continued tracking through central Alabama that afternoon and into the early evening hours. A dangerous and destructive tornado struck the city of Cullman, Alabama, at around 3:00 p.m. CDT (20:00 UTC). This large, multiple-vortex tornado was captured on several tower cameras from television stations, such as Fox affiliate WBRC (channel 6) and ABC affiliate WBMA-LD/WCFT-TV/WJSU-TV (channels 58, 33, and 40) both out of Birmingham. Tornadoes continued touching down further to the northeast as the sun set, particularly in Georgia. This included the Ringgold tornado.

== Tornado summary ==
- Damage survey track of this tornado (centermost red line), as well as the tracks of other EF3+ tornadoes that occurred during 2011 Super Outbreak. (Interactive map, click or tap to view in detail); View mapdata Key EF0 65–85 mph (105–137 km/h); EF1 86–110 mph (138–177 km/h); EF2 111–135 mph (179–217 km/h); EF3 136–165 mph (219–266 km/h); EF4 166–200 mph (267–322 km/h); EF5 ≥201 mph (323 km/h)

=== Track to Ringgold ===
The tornado first touched down at approximately 8:15 p.m. EDT to the west of Rock Spring. The tornado downed several power lines and uprooted small trees as it moved through the town, eventually crossing Will Potts Road into Catoosa County, where EF0 damage was recorded. The tornado reached EF1 intensity for the first time as it crossed the Jackson Lake, where it damaged trees. The tornado then destroyed a garage west of Brock Circle in rural Catoosa County, and several homes sustained minor damage. The tornado grew to 710 yards (0.65 km) near Holcomb Road, where it damaged several homes and blew in the doors of the Heritage Propane building.

The tornado destroyed several buildings in a strip mall; damage to the strip mall was later determined to be from a small subvortex of the main tornado. The sub-vortex also struck a parking lot and a drive-thru restaurant, tossing cars and de-roofing the building. Several people that were inside of the building sheltered in food coolers that were located in the latter half of the building; at least one person was cut by glass as the tornado moved through the building.

The Highland Pharmacy, located next to the Food Lion building, was heavily damaged by the tornado, with the front-facing wall of the building collapsing onto the strip's parking lot. A Shell gas station nearby was also struck by the tornado as it moved to the northeast at 60 miles per hour (97 km/h). The roof of the gas station was found to the southeast of its original location, and pieces of metal from the building were found wrapped around trees to the east.

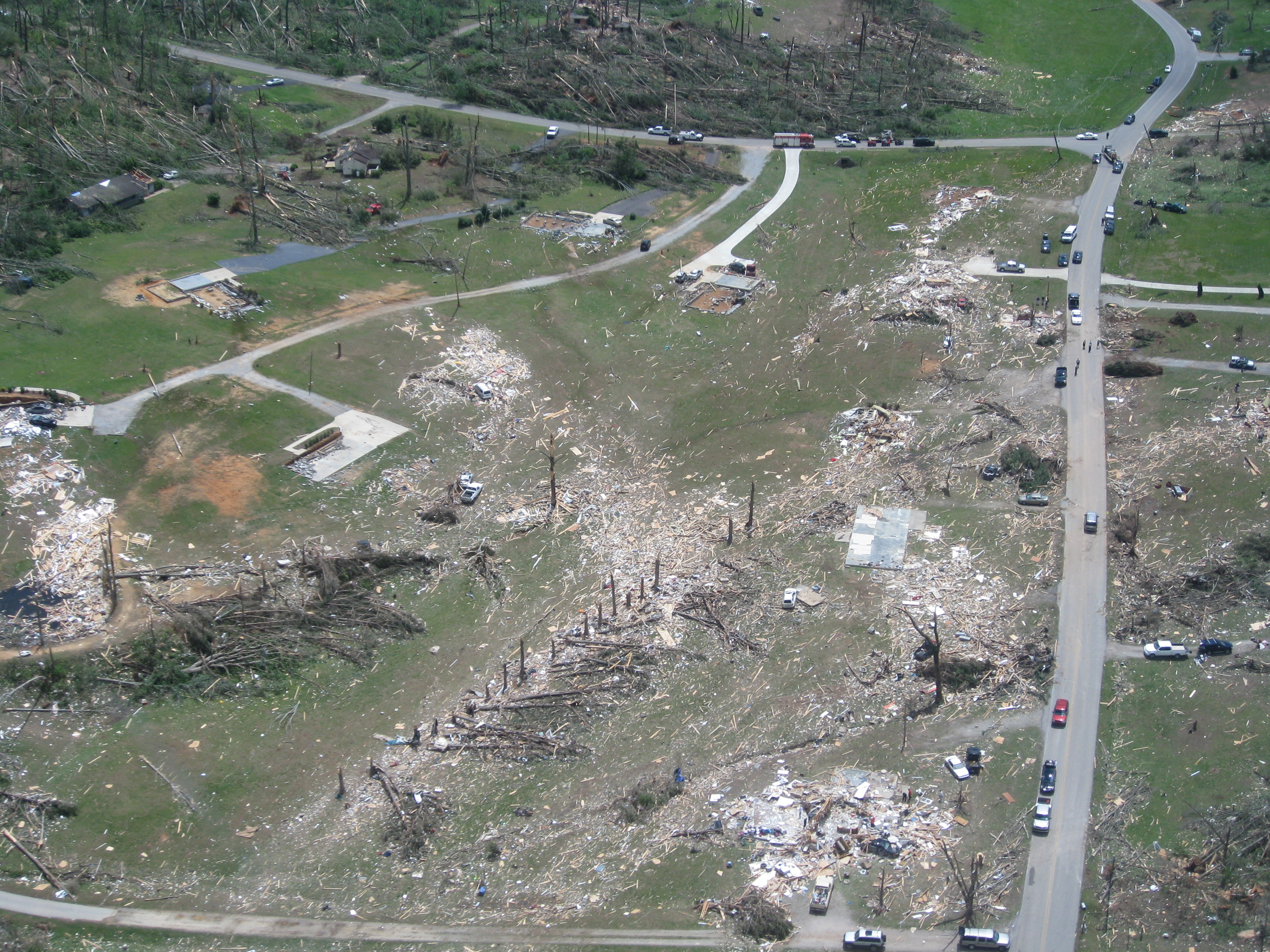
EF4-rated tornado damage near Ringgold

EF3 damage was first observed as the tornado crossed Frontage Road and hit a hotel, where the company's sign was lifted from its pole and tossed to the northeast. At Exit 348 on Interstate 75, the tornado moved through a row of restaurants, including a Ruby Tuesday. Several people who were eating at the restaurant sheltered in the kitchen area as the roof collapsed inward, falling on the dining area. A Red Roof Inn located a short distance away sustained heavy roof damage by the tornado, and headstones were broken and thrown at a cemetery nearby. A furniture store nearby was also heavily damaged, and the awning above the entrance was destroyed.

=== Heavy damage in downtown Ringgold ===
The tornado continued to move to the northeast as it hit the southern portions of Clark Field, before entering the downtown district of Ringgold. The tornado took its first life on Clark Circle, where the home of Rhea McClanahan was swept away, resulting in his death. Several homes on Spark Street were also destroyed by the tornado as it moved past. A building on the corner of Nashville Street and Clark Circle was heavily damaged, and a church nearby was completely destroyed. As the tornado struck a laundromat, the ceiling of the building fell on several people who were sheltering under tables, but none were injured.

The Ringgold High and Middle schools, located to the north of the town's center, took a direct hit by the tornado. Six tennis courts that were positioned in a grid patten on the main campus were ripped from the ground, and the nets were picked up by the winds of the tornado and tossed. Light poles that were located near the complex's football field were tipped over, and light towers that illuminated the field were bent and fell on the field. The tornado uprooted trees and heavily damaged homes as it moved past Ooltewah-Ringgold Road, before running directly on top of Cherokee Valley Road, and later crossing Swallow Lane, where numerous homes were de-roofed and sustained other forms of damage, and a further twelve were completely destroyed.

The first indication of EF4 intensity was observed as the tornado crossed Council Lane, where two homes were obliterated. Trees nearby were also debarked, and a short distance away several other homes were destroyed. The tornado grew to a width of 1,400 yards (1.3 km) as it moved through a neighborhood located near Friendship Road, where 20 homes were destroyed and deep cycloidal ground scouring was documented. A pickup truck located in the area was lofted by the tornado and thrown 40 yards (37 m) away. The tornado continued to heavily granulate debris at is moved to the northeast, as more vehicles were lofted. A family of four were killed in a home as they tried to take shelter in a closet.

=== Hamilton County and damage near Apison ===
After crossing Ware Road and London Lane, the tornado moved into Hamilton County, Tennessee, immediately destroying a home and snapping trees as it moved closer to Apison. At this point in its life, the tornado was approximately 1,350 yards (1.23 km) in width. The tornado continued to produce EF4-consistent damage as it moved across Bill Jones Road, where it obliterated a multi-story brick building and dropped a 1,200 pounds (19,000 oz) gun safe on a family who was sheltering inside of a closet in a nearby home. Despite several members of the family sustaining serious injuries, all survived the tornado.

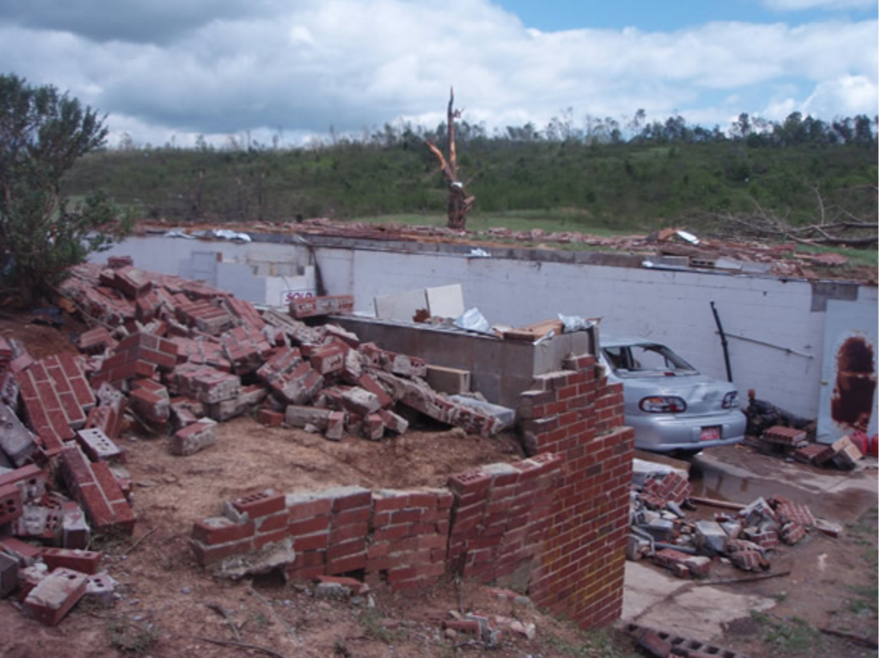
Heavy damage to a multi-story brick home in Apison

The tornado then moved through the southern end of Apison, where 18 homes were destroyed on Apison Pike and two other nearby roads. Vehicles in the area were lofted by the tornado and found approximately 100 yards (91 m) from their original locations. Eight people were killed within a few minutes of the tornado impacting Apison, and extreme ground scouring occurred as the tornado continued to move to the northeast, where several more homes were destroyed along Alabama Road. In Hamilton County, the tornado produced a total of $20 million (2024 USD) in damages, and 56 homes were destroyed.

After devastating Apison, the tornado tracked into Bradley County, striking a neighborhood located on Wilhoit Drive. One home in the area was destroyed, and several others sustained varying levels of damage. More homes were swept away as the tornado crossed Tunnel Hill Road, and a Lincoln Town Car was lifted by the tornado and tossed approximately 225 yards (206 m) away before being dropped over a field. Two people were killed on Leadmine Valley Road as the tornado moved past, and several mobile homes were obliterated nearby.

=== Track through Cleveland and dissipation ===
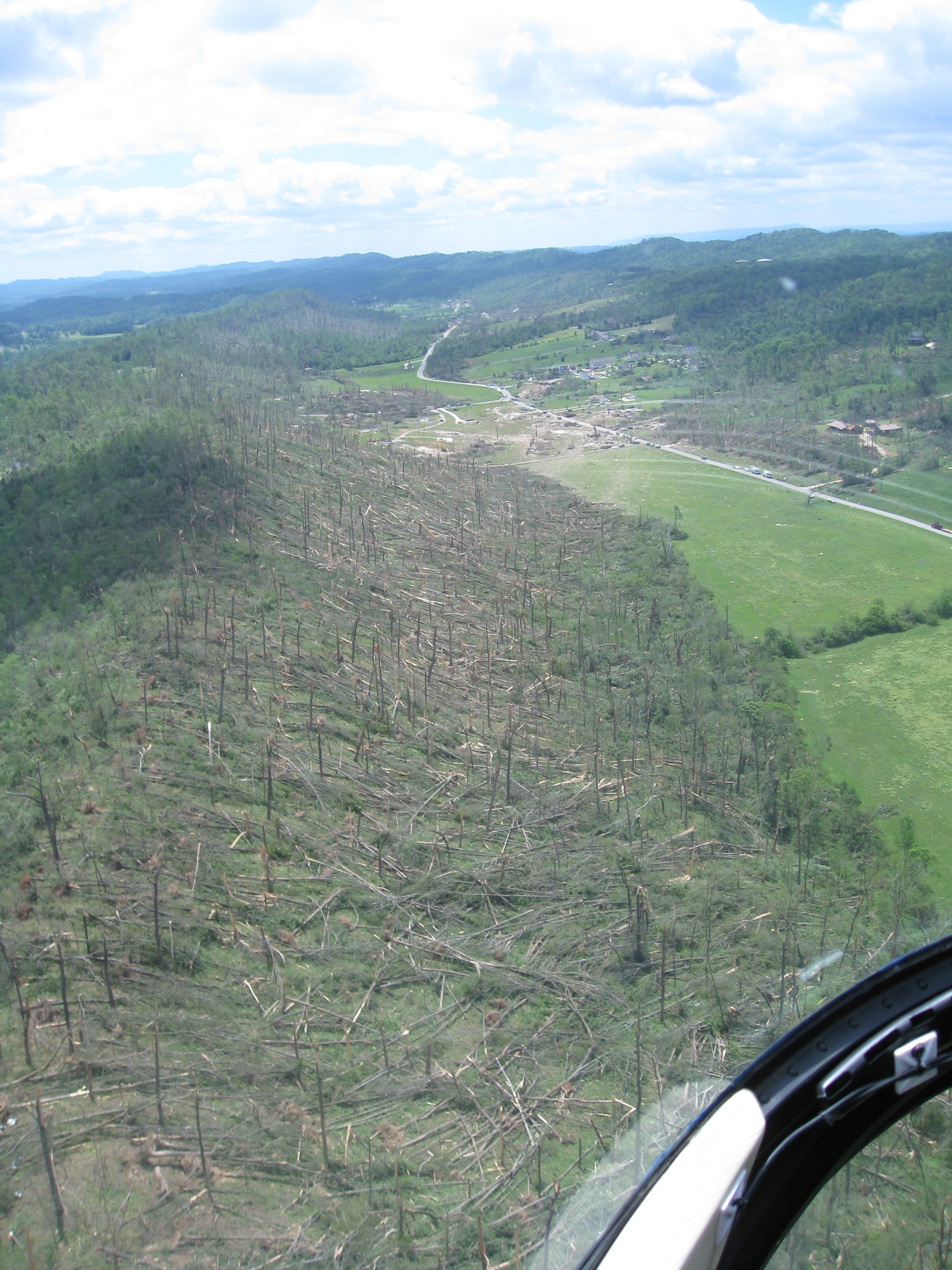
Flattenened trees and homes destroyed by the tornado along Cherokee Valley Road

The tornado killed four people along Blue Springs Road as it neared the town of Cleveland and surrounding areas, which had a combined population of 116,000 people in March 2011, a month before the tornado. A complex of trailers located to the northeast of Blue Springs Road was struck by the tornado, and several of the trailers were completely destroyed. A short distance away, the tornado narrowly avoided hitting the Blue Springs Elementary School, where a tree fell into the cafeteria. The school never reopened, and was demolished later the same year. To the northeast, two children were killed as the tornado hit and obliterated a multi-story home; several others in the structure sustained serious injuries.

The tornado obliterated several other homes as it moved across the Brooklawn Trail, and passed through the Willbrook Circle neighborhood near U.S. Route 64 a short time later, where one person was killed. After the tornado, a man was arrested after he was found looting tornado-damaged homes in the neighborhood. A man in the English Oaks neighborhood, located to the northeast of Willbrook Circle, was injured when the tornado dropped a large block of concrete on the front porch of his home, which penetrated into the basement.

The tornado damaged over 800 trees as it passed through an area that was hit by an EF2 tornado earlier on April 27. On Benton Pike, a home was heavily damaged and de-roofed. The home was the last major structures to be hit by the now-weakening tornado in Bradley County. The tornado continued to the northeast, destroying a single mobile home before entering into Polk County, Tennessee, where the tornado inflicted minor damage to a home before moving into McMinn County. The tornado briefly regained strength as it moved over Piney Grove Road, where a home was destroyed. A man was injured inside of a trailer home on the road as the tornado moved through the area, and uprooted trees before dissipating at 9:07 p.m. EDT to the east of Huffman Avenue. The tornado was on the ground for a total of 52 minutes, and killed twenty people along a 54.75-mile (88.11 km) path that stretched over five counties through Georgia and Tennessee.

== Aftermath ==
List of confirmed fatalities from the tornado (Note: Due to discrepancies between official publications, some of these deaths may have been caused by other tornadoes.)
Name	Age	State	County/City
Rhea McClanahan	86	GA	Ringgold
Holly Readus	26	GA	Ringgold
Robert Jones	47	GA	Ringgold
Jack Estep	61	GA	Ringgold
Chris Black	47	GA	Ringgold
Pam Black	46	GA	Ringgold
Cody Black	21	GA	Ringgold
Chelsea Black	16	GA	Ringgold
Unborn infant	0	GA	Ringgold
Adam Carroll	17	TN	Apison area
Bobby Raper	63	TN	Apison area
Mary Raper	60	TN	Apison area
Brenda Prescott	56	TN	Apison area
Donald Christian	70	TN	Apison area
Dorothy Christian	62	TN	Apison area
Joann Darnell	77	TN	Apison area
Joshua Poe	31	TN	Apison area
Chase Glasgow	0	TN	Cleveland
Eva Catlett	67	TN	Cleveland
Evelyn Johnson	56	TN	Cleveland
Kandice Satterfield	40	TN	Cleveland
Lisa Pack	42	TN	Cleveland
Rhonda Smith	33	TN	Cleveland
Tammi Glasgow	42	TN	Cleveland
Tommy Evans	56	TN	Cleveland

The tornado killed an estimated twenty to twenty-five people, the majority of which occurred in Tennessee. Discrepancies exist between the Storm Prediction Center's total fatality count of 20, and the Storm Data publication for April 2011, which listed 21 fatalities. In Ringgold, a disaster relief center was set up in a tennis court. The Ringgold United Methodist Church was used to store food and other necessities. A school was used for shelter for those impacted by the tornado. The Finley Stadium, in Chattanooga, Tennessee, was used for Ringgold High School's football team. Students at Ringgold High School had to finish up the remaining school year at a different high school. A FEMA Individual Assistance Disaster Recovery center was set up on Muscogee Trail. Former Georgia governor Nathan Deal issued a state of emergency for Floyd, Dade, Walker and Catoosa counties. The tornado inflicted an estimated total in excess of $88 million (2024 USD) in damages to several communities.

=== Possible EF5 intensity ===
On January 23, 2025, Anthony W. Lyza with the National Severe Storms Laboratory along with Harold E. Brooks and Makenzie J. Kroca with the University of Oklahoma’s School of Meteorology published a paper to the American Meteorological Society, where they stated the tornado in Ringgold was an "EF5 candidate" and opined that the EF5 starting wind speed should be 190 mph (310 km/h) instead of 201 mph (323 km/h).

== See also ==
- List of tornadoes in the 2011 Super Outbreak
  - 2011 Hackleburg–Phil Campbell tornado, an EF5 tornado that struck Alabama on the same day
  - 2011 Rainsville tornado, an EF5 tornado that was part of the supercell that formed the Ringgold tornado
- List of deadliest tornadoes in the Americas

== Sources ==
=== Further reading ===
- Narramore, Jen (January 6, 2024). "Overview of the Ringgold-Apison-Cleveland, GA-TN, EF4 tornado - April 27, 2011". TornadoTalk.
- Narramore, Jen; Tucker, Nelson (January 6, 2024). "Ringgold, GA EF4 tornado - April 27, 2011". TornadoTalk.
- Tucker, Nelson; Narramore, Jen (January 6, 2024). "Apison-Cleveland, TN EF4 Tornado – April 27, 2011". TornadoTalk.
