= Salem Valley =

Valley in Georgia, United States

Coordinates: 34.9481319°N 85.0674494°W

Salem Valley is a basin in Catoosa County, Georgia. There is also a "valley of Salem" mentioned in the apocryphal Book of Judith.

== History ==
Salem Valley took its name from Salem Baptist Church.
