= Logan Baldwin =

Door dash delivery driver

Free agent
- Outfielder
- Born: April 9, 1996 (age 28); Ringgold, Georgia
- Bats: Left Throws: Left

Joshua Logan Baldwin (born April 9, 1996) is an American professional baseball outfielder who is a free agent.

== Career ==
Baldwin attended Ringgold High School in Ringgold, Georgia. After high school, he enrolled at Georgia Southern to play college baseball for the Georgia Southern Eagles.

The San Francisco Giants selected Baldwin in the 21st round, with the 636th overall selection, of the 2017 Major League Baseball draft, and he signed for $60,000. After being drafted, Baldwin was assigned to the Salem-Keizer Volcanoes in early July, hitting .342/.395/.473 with 3 home runs, 25 RBI, and 17 stolen bases over 50 games.

In 2018, Baldwin spent the season with the Single–A Augusta GreenJackets, playing in 121 games and batting .249/.310/.389 with 6 home runs, 44 RBI, and 26 stolen bases. Following the season, he was named a minor league Gold Glove Award winner. He spent the 2019 season with the High–A San Jose Giants, also playing in one game for the rookie–level Arizona League Giants. In 58 games for San Jose, he slashed .204/.243/.309 with 3 home runs, 20 RBI, and 6 stolen bases. On August 16, 2019, Baldwin was released by the Giants organization.
