= Heritage High School (Ringgold, Georgia) =

Public secondary school located in Ringgold, Georgia, United States

Location
- 3960 Poplar Springs Road; Ringgold, Georgia, Catoosa County 30736-5811; United States; 34°53′31″N 85°11′12″W

Information
- Type: Public
- Established: June 2008 (18 years ago)
- School district: Catoosa County School District
- CEEB code: 112536
- Principal: Matthew Phillips
- Teaching staff: 93.60 (FTE)
- Grades: 9–12
- Enrollment: 1,263 (2023-2024)
- Student to teacher ratio: 13.49
- Colors: Red, white, navy
- Mascot: General
- Rival: Ringgold High School Lakeview Fort Oglethorpe High School
- Website: hhs.catoosa.k12.ga.us

Heritage High School (HHS) is a public secondary school located in Ringgold, Georgia, United States. It is in the Catoosa County Public Schools district.

Heritage High School was founded in 2008. It was the first high school opened by Catoosa County in three decades. The school's cost was $42.5 million. It was founded to alleviate the overcrowding at Lakeview-Fort Oglethorpe High School and Ringgold High School. Heritage High School is the "Home of the Generals." It has 72 classrooms.

== Athletics ==
The school has a number of GHSA-recognized sports such as football, wrestling, baseball, competition cheerleading, cross country, golf, softball, swimming, basketball, tennis, soccer, volleyball, track. Notably, the softball program has won GHSA state titles in 2018, 2019, 2020, and 2023 in the AAAA division. In 2026, the girls' basketball team won the AAA state title, defeating Sandy Creek High School in overtime. The school will represent Region 7-AAA in all sports beginning in 2024.

== Notable alumni ==
- Cole Wilcox - professional baseball player
