= Georgia State Route 146 =

State highway in Georgia, United States

State Route 146
- Cloud Springs Road
- SR 146 highlighted in red

Route information
- Maintained by GDOT
- Length: 5.1 mi (8.2 km)

Major junctions
- West end: US 27 / SR 1 in Fort Oglethorpe
- I-75 northwest of Indian Springs
- East end: US 41 / US 76 / SR 3 northwest of Indian Springs

Location
- Country: United States
- State: Georgia
- Counties: Catoosa

Highway system
- Georgia State Highway System; Interstate; US; State; Special
← SR 145	→ SR 147

State Route 146 (SR 146) is a 5.1-mile-long (8.2 km) state highway that runs west-to-east through portions of Catoosa county in the northwestern part of the U.S. state of Georgia.

== Route description ==
The route begins at an intersection with U.S. Route 27 (US 27) and SR 1 in Fort Oglethorpe. It heads east to an interchange with Interstate 75 (I-75), northwest of Indian Springs. It curves to the northeast to meet its eastern terminus at US 41/US 76/SR 3, also northwest of Indian Springs. SR 146 is not part of the National Highway System.

== Major intersections ==
The entire route is in Catoosa County.

Location	mi	km	Destinations	Notes
Fort Oglethorpe	0.0	0.0	US 27 / SR 1 (Lafayette Road) – Rossville, Chickamauga	Western terminus
	4.4	7.1	I-75 (Larry McDonald Memorial Highway / SR 401) – Chattanooga, Atlanta	I-75 exit 353
	5.1	8.2	US 41 / US 76 / SR 3 (Old Dixie Highway) – Chattanooga, Dalton	Eastern terminus
1.000 mi = 1.609 km; 1.000 km = 0.621 mi
