= Georgia's 3rd House of Representatives district =

State district in Georgia, USA

Georgia's 3rd State House of Representatives district
Representative
Mitchell Horner; R–Ringgold
- Demographics: 91.0% White; 2.6% Black; 2.7% Hispanic; 1.7% Asian
- Population: 55,819

District 3 elects one member of the Georgia House of Representatives. It contains parts of Catoosa County.

== Members ==
- Tom Weldon (until 2017)
- Dewayne Hill (2017–2023)
- Mitchell Horner (since 2023)
