= Napier Gap =

Coordinates: 34°52′07″N 85°13′05″W

Napier Gap [elevation: 830 feet (250 m)] is a gap in Catoosa County, in the U.S. state of Georgia.

The Napier family kept a store at Napier's Crossroads near this gap that was named for them.
