= Rabbit Valley (Georgia-Tennessee) =

Coordinates: 34°55′53″N 85°06′35″W

Rabbit Valley is a valley in Catoosa County, Georgia and Hamilton County, Tennessee. It is also a valley in Bradley County, Tennessee (adjacent to Hamilton County).

== History ==
Rabbit Valley was so named because its rocky terrain was suitable for rabbits, or because a large number of rabbits lived there, according to local history.
