= Wood Station, Georgia =

Unincorporated community in Georgia, U.S.

Coordinates: 34°48′17″N 85°08′56″W

Wood Station is an unincorporated community in Catoosa County, in the U.S. state of Georgia.

== History ==
The community was named after Johnny Wood, proprietor of a local country store. Variant names are "Woods Station" and "Woodstation". A post office called Wood's Station was established in 1837, and remained in operation until 1907.

== Education ==
Public education in Wood Station is administered by Catoosa County Public Schools. The district operates Woodstation Elementary School.
