= Graysville, Georgia =

Human settlement in Catoosa County, Georgia, United States

Coordinates: 34°58′35″N 85°08′29″W

Graysville is an unincorporated community in Catoosa County, in the U.S. state of Georgia. It is part of the Chattanooga, Tennessee–GA Metropolitan Statistical Area. The ZIP Code for Graysville is 30726.

== Geography ==
Graysville is located about one mile south of the Georgia-Tennessee border. South Chickamauga Creek flows past the southwest side of the community.

== History ==
A post office has been in operation in Graysville since 1856. The community was named for John D. Gray, a railroad official.

The Georgia General Assembly incorporated the place as the Town of Graysville in 1872. The town's municipal charter was dissolved in 1995.
