= Dewayne Hill =

American politician from Georgia

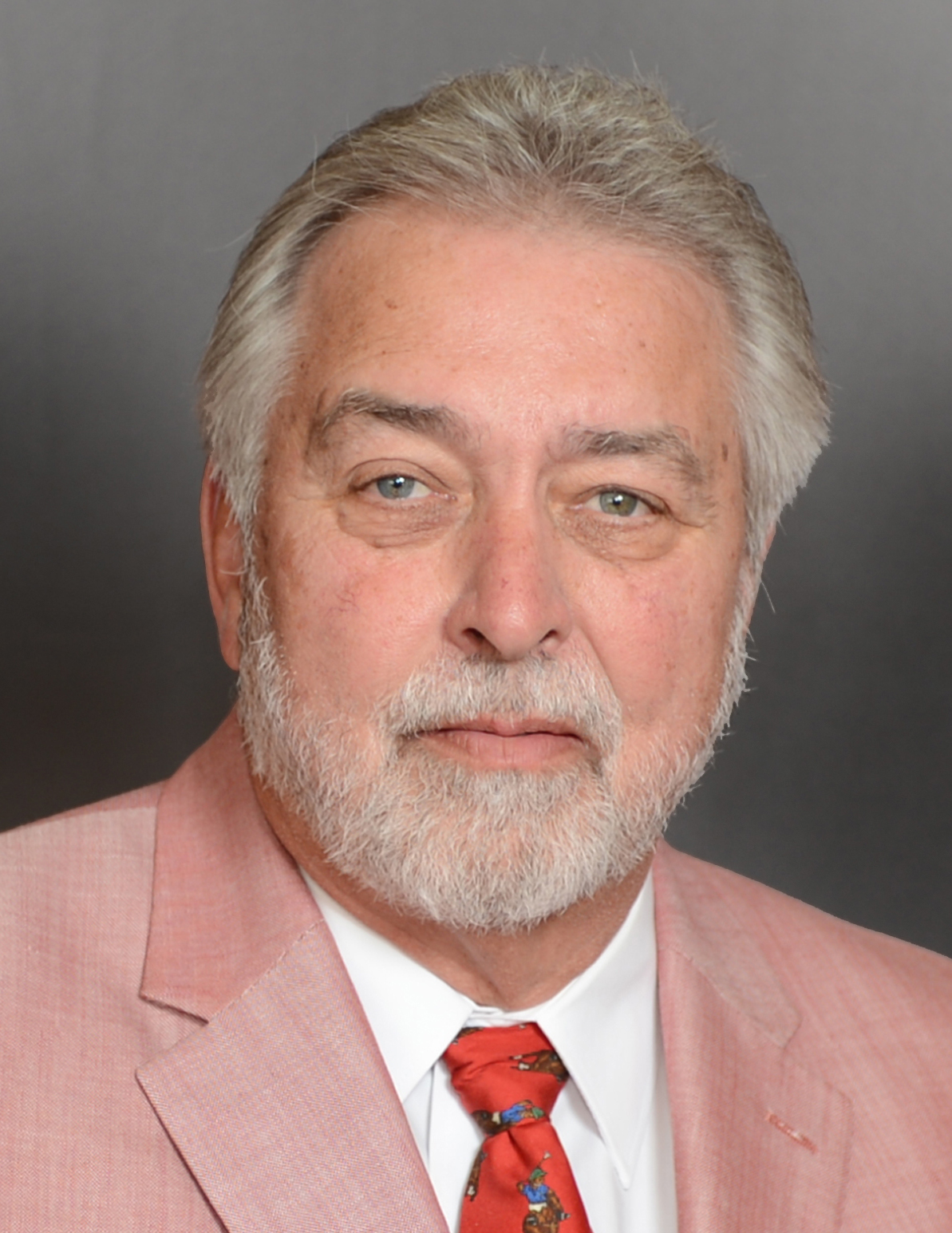

Member of the Georgia House of Representatives from the 3rd district
- In office January 9, 2017 – January 9, 2023
- Preceded by: Tom Weldon
- Succeeded by: Mitchell Horner

Personal details
- Born: Ivan Dewayne Hill; November 14, 1950 (age 75) Ringgold, Georgia, U.S.
- Party: Republican
- Spouse: Wyondia
- Children: 6
- Education: Dalton State College; Chattanooga State Technical Community College
- Occupation: Small business owner

Ivan Dewayne Hill is an American politician from Georgia. Hill is a former Republican member of the Georgia House of Representatives from the 3rd District, serving from 2017 to 2023. Hill has sponsored 18 bills.

== Personal life ==
Hill's wife is Wyondia Hill. They have six children. Hill and his family live in Ringgold, Georgia.

Georgia House of Representatives
Preceded by Tom Weldon	Member of the Georgia House of Representatives from the 3rd district 2017–2023	Succeeded by Mitchell Horner
