= Mitchell Horner =

American politician

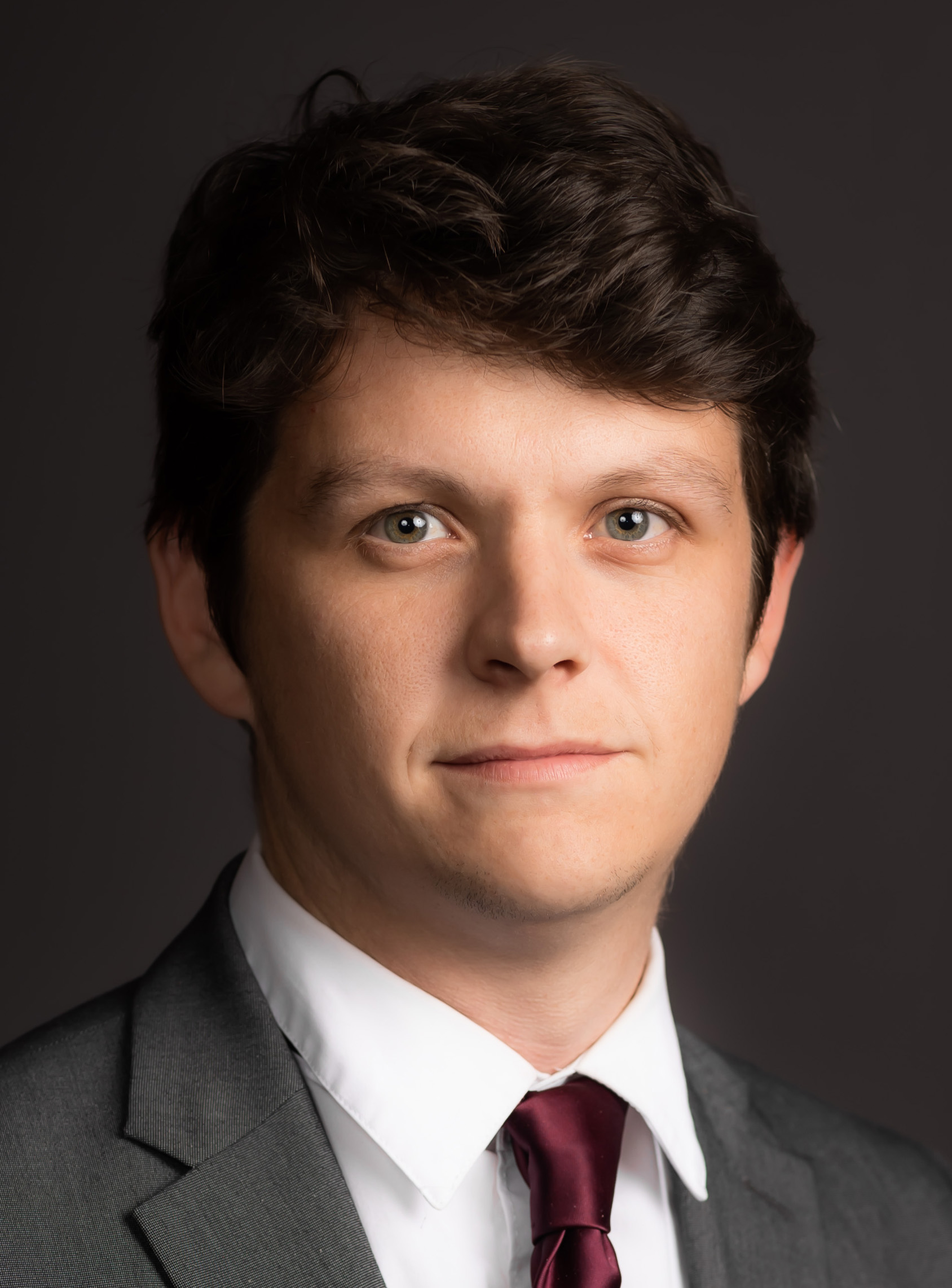

Member of the Georgia House of Representatives from the 3rd district
- Incumbent
- Assumed office January 9, 2023
- Preceded by: Dewayne Hill

Personal details
- Born: Edward Mitchell Horner; May 4, 1994 (age 32)
- Party: Republican
- Spouse: Roxanne Horner
- Children: 2

Edward Mitchell Horner (born May 4, 1994) is an American politician. He serves as a Republican member for the 3rd district of the Georgia House of Representatives.

== Life and career ==
Horner was home-schooled. He was a businessperson.

In 2022, Horner defeated his opponent Darrell Weldon Sr. in the Republican primary election for the 3rd district of the Georgia House of Representatives. No Democratic candidate or incumbent was nominated to challenge him in the general election. He assumed his office in 2023, succeeding Dewayne Hill.
