= Walker County Schools =

School district in Georgia (U.S. state)

Address
- 301 North Cherokee Street LaFayette, Georgia, 30728; United States

District information
- Grades: Pre-Kindergarten – 12
- Superintendent: Damon Raines
- Accreditation(s): Southern Association of Colleges and Schools; Georgia Accrediting Commission

Students and staff
- Enrollment: 8,401 (2022–23)
- Faculty: 692.80 (FTE)

Other information
- Website: walkerschools.org

The Walker County Schools is a public school district in Walker County, Georgia, United States, based in LaFayette.

It includes all parts of Walker County that are not in the city limits of Chickamauga. The district includes the communities of Chattanooga Valley, Fairview, Flintstone, LaFayette, Lookout Mountain, and Rossville. It also includes Walker County portions of Fort Oglethorpe and Lakeview.

== Schools ==
=== Elementary schools ===
- Chattanooga Valley Elementary School
- Cherokee Ridge Elementary
- Fairyland Elementary School
- Gilbert Elementary School
- Naomi Elementary School
- North LaFayette Elementary School
- Rock Spring Elementary School
- Rossville Elementary School
- Stone Creek Elementary School
- Saddle Ridge Elementary School

=== Middle schools ===
- Chattanooga Valley Middle School
- LaFayette Middle School
- Rossville Middle School
- Saddle Ridge Middle School

=== High schools ===
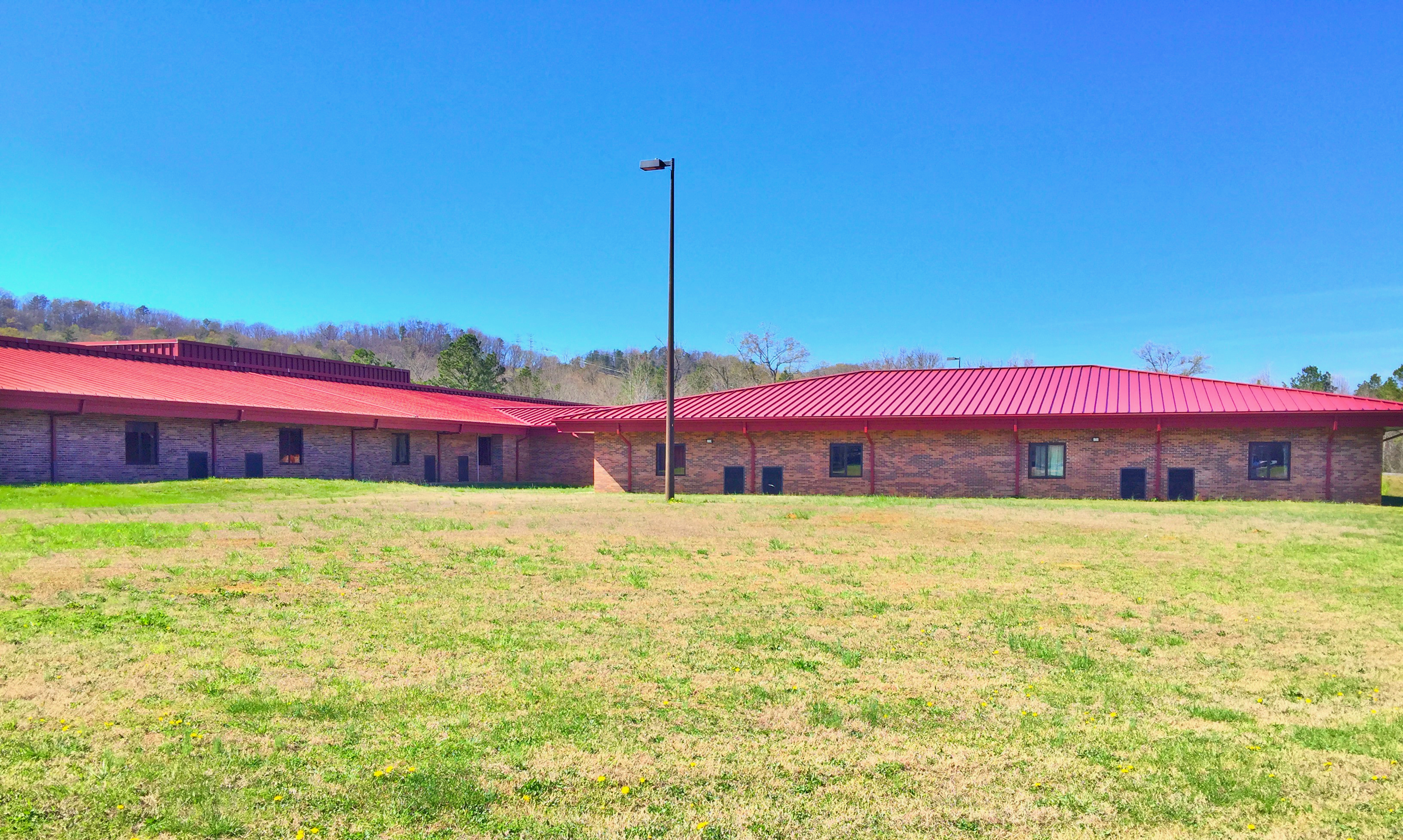
Ridgeland High School in Walker County, Georgia

- LaFayette High School
- Ridgeland High School

== Closed Schools ==
=== Elementary schools ===
- Happy Valley Elementary School
- Fairview Elementary School

=== High schools ===
- Chattanooga Valley High School
- Rossville High School
