= Lakeview, Georgia =

- Unincorporated community Census-designated place
- Location in Catoosa County and the state of Georgia
- Coordinates: 34°58′42″N 85°15′26″W
- Country: United States
- State: Georgia
- Counties: Catoosa, Walker

Area
  - Total: 2.29 sq mi (5.92 km^{2})
  - Land: 2.27 sq mi (5.88 km^{2})
  - Water: 0.012 sq mi (0.03 km^{2})
- Elevation: 768 ft (234 m)

Population (2020)
  - Total: 4,777
  - Density: 2,102.9/sq mi (811.92/km^{2})
- Time zone: UTC-5 (Eastern (EST))
  - Summer (DST): UTC-4 (EDT)
- zip code: 30741
- Area codes: 706/762
- FIPS code: 13-44900
- GNIS feature ID: 0332171

Lakeview is an unincorporated community and census-designated place (CDP) in Catoosa and Walker counties in the U.S. state of Georgia. The population was 4,820 at the 2000 census and 4,777 at the 2020 census. It is part of the Chattanooga, TN–GA Metropolitan Statistical Area.

== History ==
Lakeview had its start in the year 1925 as a planned community on Lake Winnepesaukah. The Lake Winnie amusement park is presently within its boundaries.

== Geography ==
Lakeview is located at 34°58'42" North, 85°15'26" West (34.978472, -85.257346).

According to the United States Census Bureau, the CDP has a total area of 2.3 square miles (6.0 km^{2}), of which 2.3 square miles (6.0 km^{2}) is land and 0.44% is water.

== Demographics ==
Historical population
Census	Pop.	Note	%±
1980	5,403		—
1990	5,184		−4.1%
2000	4,820		−7.0%
2010	4,839		0.4%
2020	4,777		−1.3%
U.S. Decennial Census; 1850-1870 1870-1880; 1890-1910 1920-1930; 1940 1950 1960; 1970 1980 1990; 2000 2010 2020

Lakeview was first listed as a CDP in the 1980 United States census.

=== Racial and ethnic composition ===
Lakeview, Georgia – Racial and ethnic composition Note: the U.S. census treats Hispanic/Latino as an ethnic category. This table excludes Latinos from the racial categories and assigns them to a separate category. Hispanics/Latinos may be of any race.
Race / Ethnicity (NH = Non-Hispanic)	Pop 2000	Pop 2010	Pop 2020	% 2000	% 2010	% 2020
White alone (NH)	4,638	4,541	4,117	96.22%	93.84%	86.18%
Black or African American alone (NH)	30	70	137	0.62%	1.45%	2.87%
Native American or Alaska Native alone (NH)	24	26	20	0.50%	0.54%	0.42%
Asian alone (NH)	36	51	44	0.75%	1.05%	0.92%
Native Hawaiian or Pacific Islander alone (NH)	1	2	12	0.02%	0.04%	0.25%
Other race alone (NH)	1	4	12	0.02%	0.08%	0.25%
Mixed race or Multiracial (NH)	46	84	249	0.95%	1.74%	5.21%
Hispanic or Latino (any race)	44	61	186	0.91%	1.26%	3.89%
Total	4,820	4,839	4,777	100.00%	100.00%	100.00%

=== 2020 census ===
As of the 2020 census, Lakeview had a population of 4,777. The median age was 40.8 years. 21.6% of residents were under the age of 18 and 19.9% were 65 years of age or older. For every 100 females, there were 94.3 males, and for every 100 females age 18 and over, there were 90.3 males.

100.0% of residents lived in urban areas, while 0.0% lived in rural areas.

There were 1,959 households in Lakeview, of which 29.0% had children under the age of 18 living in them. Of all households, 43.5% were married-couple households, 17.4% were households with a male householder and no spouse or partner present, and 31.9% were households with a female householder and no spouse or partner present. About 27.5% of all households were made up of individuals, and 13.6% had someone living alone who was 65 years of age or older.

There were 2,136 housing units, of which 8.3% were vacant. The homeowner vacancy rate was 3.2% and the rental vacancy rate was 4.2%.

=== 2000 census ===
As of the census of 2000, there were 4,820 people, 1,996 households, and 1,413 families residing in the CDP. The population density was 2,112.1 inhabitants per square mile (815.5/km^{2}). There were 2,160 housing units at an average density of 946.5 per square mile (365.4/km^{2}). The racial makeup of the CDP was 96.93% White, 0.62% African American, 0.50% Native American, 0.77% Asian, 0.04% Pacific Islander, 0.17% from other races, and 0.98% from two or more races. Hispanic or Latino of any race were 0.91% of the population.

There were 1,996 households, out of which 27.9% had children under the age of 18 living with them, 54.4% were married couples living together, 11.7% had a female householder with no husband present, and 29.2% were non-families. 25.2% of all households were made up of individuals, and 12.0% had someone living alone who was 65 years of age or older. The average household size was 2.41 and the average family size was 2.88.

In the CDP, the population was spread out, with 22.4% under the age of 18, 7.7% from 18 to 24, 27.1% from 25 to 44, 25.0% from 45 to 64, and 17.8% who were 65 years of age or older. The median age was 40 years. For every 100 females, there were 90.4 males. For every 100 females age 18 and over, there were 85.2 males.

The median income for a household in the CDP was $34,817, and the median income for a family was $43,024. Males had a median income of $31,286 versus $22,018 for females. The per capita income for the CDP was $16,873. About 6.5% of families and 9.7% of the population were below the poverty line, including 13.5% of those under age 18 and 10.6% of those age 65 or over.

== Education ==
The portion in Catoosa County is in the Catoosa County School District, as are all other areas of the county.

The portion in Walker County is in the Walker County School District.
