= Catoosa County Public Schools =

School district in Georgia (U.S. state)

Catoosa County School District

Address
- 307 Cleveland Street Ringgold, Georgia, 30736-2057; United States
- Coordinates: 34.918854°N 85.110951°W

District information
- Grades: Pre-kindergarten – 12
- Superintendent: Chance Nix

Students and staff
- Enrollment: 10,426 (2022–23)
- Faculty: 824.10 (FTE)
- Staff: 941.80 (FTE)
- Student–teacher ratio: 12.65

Other information
- Accreditation: Southern Association of Colleges and Schools; Georgia Accrediting Commission
- Telephone: (706) 965-2297
- Fax: (706) 965-8913
- Website: catoosa.k12.ga.us

The Catoosa County School District is a public school district in Catoosa County, Georgia, United States, based in Ringgold, Georgia.

Its boundaries are parallel with those of the county, and serves the communities of Indian Springs and Ringgold, as well as the Catoosa County portions of Fort Oglethorpe and Lakeview.

== History ==
In 1954, the Ringgold Elementary School was destroyed in a fire.

== Schools ==
The Catoosa County School District has ten elementary schools, three middle schools, and four high schools.

=== Elementary schools ===
- Battlefield Elementary School
- Battlefield Primary School
- Boynton Elementary School
- Cloud Springs Elementary School
- Graysville Elementary School
- Ringgold Elementary School
- Ringgold Primary School
- Tiger Creek Elementary School
- West Side Elementary School
- Woodstation Elementary School

=== Middle schools ===
- Heritage Middle School
- Lakeview Middle School
- Ringgold Middle School

=== High schools ===
- Heritage High School
- Lakeview Fort Oglethorpe High School
- Ringgold High School
- Performance Learning Center
