= Lakeview Fort Oglethorpe High School =

Public high school in Fort Oglethorpe, Georgia

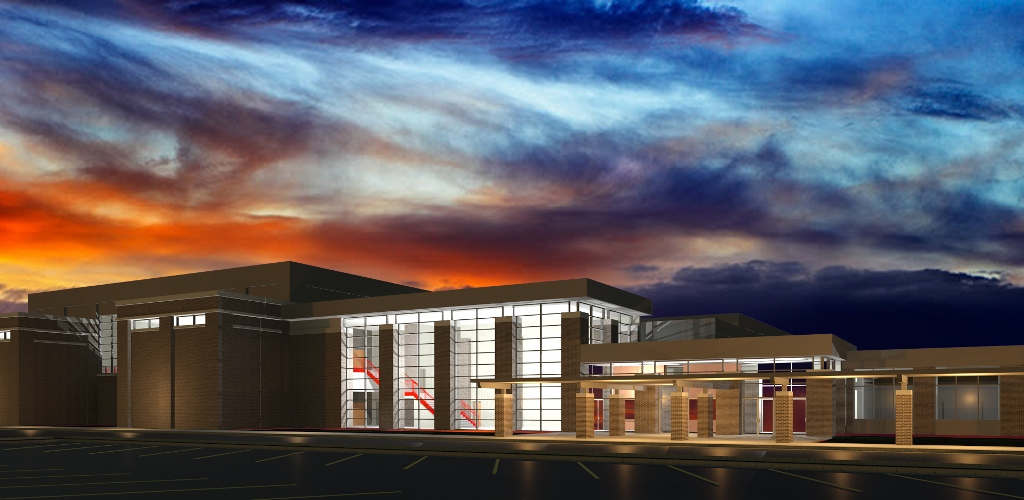
- LFO High School, Jerry Jones Gymnasium

Location
- 1850 Battlefield Parkway; Fort Oglethorpe, Georgia 30742; United States; 34°56′48″N 85°14′07″W

Information
- Former name: Lakeview High School (1916-1973)
- School type: Public
- Opened: 1916 (110 years ago)
- School district: Catoosa County Schools
- Superintendent: Chance Nix
- CEEB code: 112612
- Principal: Brad Langford
- Teaching staff: 81.00 (FTE)
- Enrollment: 963 (2024-2025)
- Student to teacher ratio: 11.89
- Colors: Red and white
- Mascot: Warrior
- Website: www.lfo.catoosa.k12.ga.us

Lakeview Fort Oglethorpe High School (LFO) is a public high school located in Fort Oglethorpe, Georgia. It is one of three high schools in Catoosa County, and is operated by the Catoosa County Schools district.

The school's teams are known as the Warriors. Lakeview Fort Oglethorpe High School is currently in Region 6-AAA of the Georgia High School Association.

== History ==
Around the time of World War I, the Lakeview community was opened for settlement by the Chattanooga Land Company. Prior to 1915, the children of this community were either taught at home, or at the Old Chambers Homeplace. By the fall of 1915, a community school for grades 1-7 was scheduled to open, but was not completed until 1916. In the 1920s, a new school building for Lakeview was built on Oak Street including its first bell, and in 1928 its first cafeteria was built. A member of the first senior class to graduate from the new building (in 1935), S. O. Addison, chose the school colors of red and white, wrote the alma mater, and picked the name "Warriors."

Two sports were initially offered at the school – baseball and basketball. Basketball games were originally held outdoors, but later, Lake Winnepesaukah and area churches allowed Lakeview to play basketball indoors in their facilities. In 1933, the 6th Cavalry donated football equipment, and the school established its first football team as well as a school newspaper. By 1951, Lakeview Junior High and High had moved to Cross Street, and in 1973, the high school was moved to what was then Georgia Route 2A (now Georgia State Route 2, the portion that runs through Fort Oglethorpe is referred to as "Battlefield Parkway") where the Lakeview and Ft. Oglethorpe communities merged. The community pitched in to raise fund for the athletic fields, and students and parents helped do the work.

In 2013, an athletic facility project was completed, including a new basketball gym, weight training area, and other facilities.

== Sports ==
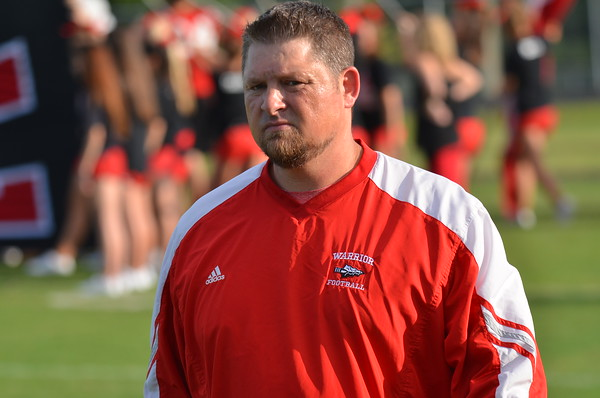
Bo Campbell before a game

=== Football ===
The LFO football team is coached by Bo Campbell, who was a defensive coordinator at Notre Dame High School in Chattanooga, Tennessee and played at the University of Tennessee at Knoxville.

=== Wrestling ===
The Warriors have produced a number of state wrestling champions. Their current coach is Donnie Welborn, who won two state titles while a student at LFO. Welborn replaced Kenny Hill, who is one of LFO's two three-time state champion. The other is Derrick Laney, a three-time champ in his sophomore, junior and senior years.

=== LFO decathlon ===
The LFO Academic Decathlon Team won nine straight Georgia state championships in their classification before the streak ended in 2020. The team has also competed in the National Championships each of those nine years. They attended the 2016 Nationals in Anchorage, Alaska.

== Notable alumni ==
- Lauren Alaina, singer
- Kane Brown, singer
- Rick Honeycutt, professional baseball player
