= Fort Oglethorpe, Georgia =

- City
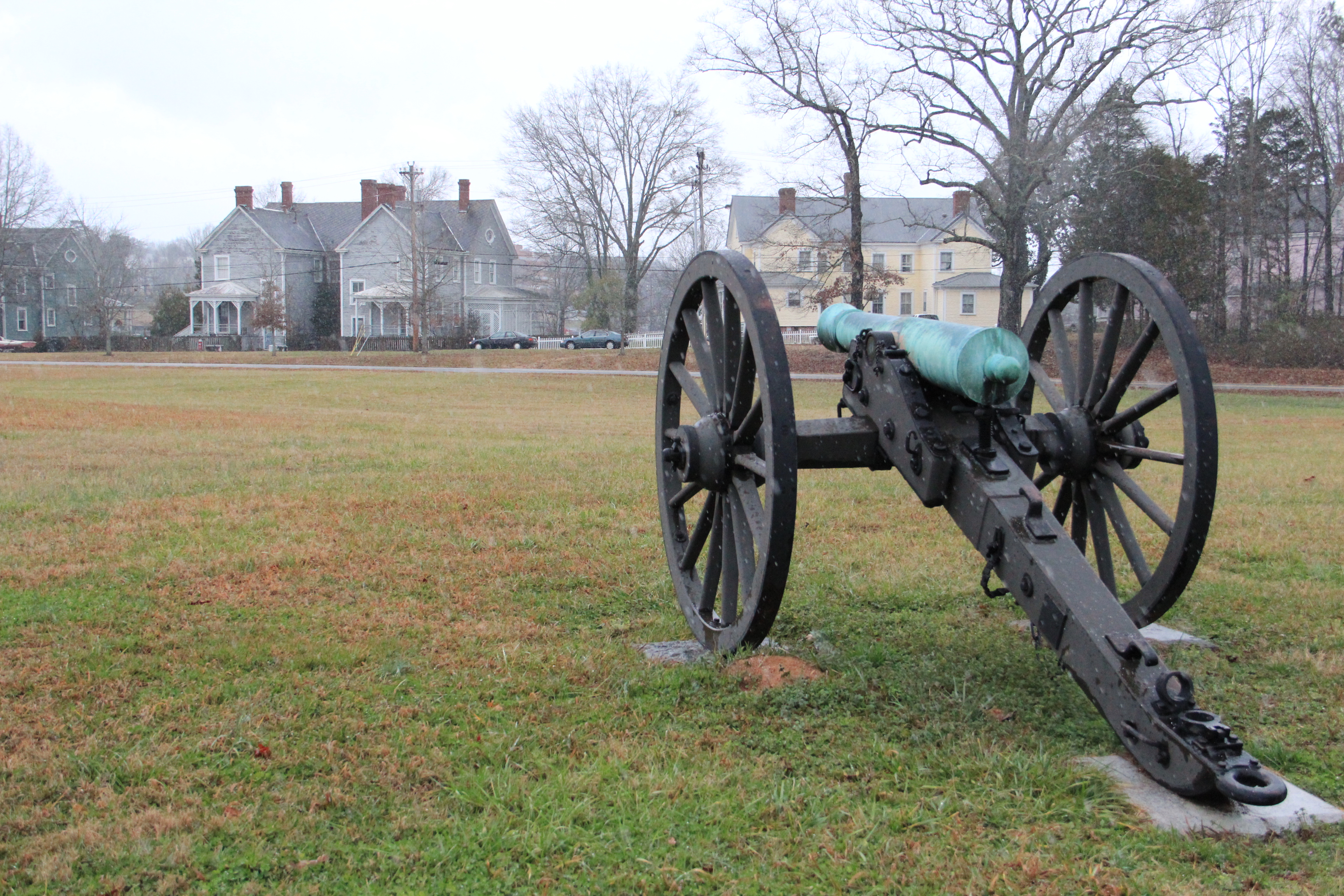
- Fort Oglethorpe, Georgia, viewed from the Chickamauga and Chattanooga National Military Park

- Seal Logo

- Location in Catoosa County and the state of Georgia
- Coordinates: 34°56′44″N 85°14′44″W
- Country: United States
- State: Georgia
- Counties: Catoosa, Walker
- Incorporated (city): 1949

Government
  - Mayor: Earl L. Gray

Area
  - Total: 13.90 sq mi (36.00 km^{2})
  - Land: 13.90 sq mi (36.00 km^{2})
  - Water: 0 sq mi (0.00 km^{2})
- Elevation: 732 ft (223 m)

Population (2020)
  - Total: 10,423
  - Density: 749.9/sq mi (289.55/km^{2})
- Time zone: UTC-5 (Eastern (EST))
  - Summer (DST): UTC-4 (EDT)
- ZIP code: 30742
- Area codes: 706/762
- FIPS code: 13-30956
- GNIS feature ID: 0331756
- Website: fortogov.com

Fort Oglethorpe is a city predominantly in Catoosa County with some portions in Walker County in the U.S. state of Georgia. As of the 2020 census, the city had a population of 10,423. It is part of the Chattanooga metropolitan area. It is home to Lakeview – Fort Oglethorpe High School.

== History ==
The United States Army established a cavalry post at the site of Hargrave, Georgia, an unincorporated town situated next to the Chickamauga National Battlefield. The existing settlement was named for a Confederate soldier, William Hamilton Hargrave, who along with his wife Amelia Cecilia Strange-Hargrave owned most of the land in the area. The couple was well known in the 19th century to travellers heading to Ross's Landing on the Tennessee River from LaFayette, Georgia. William Hargrave and other landowners in the area were forced to sell their property to the Army to be used as a base for the 6th Cavalry. The Chickamauga Post established in 1902 by the U.S. Army was later named Fort Oglethorpe after James Oglethorpe, the founder of the Colony of Georgia. During and after World War I, the fort served between 1917 and 1920 as an detention camp for civilian internees and prisoners of war. During World War II, the area served as a war-time induction and processing center, and again housed prisoners of war. Fort Oglethorpe was a major training center for the Women's Army Corps during World War II. The post land was declared surplus in 1947 and returned to civilian hands, forming the nucleus for a town that was incorporated in 1949.

== Geography ==
Fort Oglethorpe is located in western Catoosa County and northeastern Walker County at 34°56′44″N 85°14′44″W (34.945683, -85.245653). It is 9 miles (14 km) south of Chattanooga, Tennessee, by U.S. Route 27, which also leads south 18 miles (29 km) to LaFayette, Georgia. The Chickamauga and Chattanooga National Military Park takes up the southern two-thirds of the city's area.

According to the United States Census Bureau, the city has a total area of 13.9 square miles (36.0 km^{2}), all land.

== Demographics ==
Historical population
Census	Pop.	Note	%±
1950	692		—
1960	2,251		225.3%
1970	3,869		71.9%
1980	5,443		40.7%
1990	5,880		8.0%
2000	6,940		18.0%
2010	9,263		33.5%
2020	10,423		12.5%
2025 (est.)	10,868	▲	4.3%
U.S. Decennial Census; 1850-1870 1870-1880; 1890-1910 1920-1930; 1940 1950 1960; 1970 1980 1990; 2000; 2025

=== 2020 census ===
As of the 2020 census, Fort Oglethorpe had a population of 10,423. The median age was 43.6 years. 19.4% of residents were under the age of 18 and 24.5% were 65 years of age or older. For every 100 females there were 81.6 males, and for every 100 females age 18 and over there were 77.0 males.

Fort Oglethorpe racial composition
Race	Num.	Perc.
White (non-Hispanic)	8,619	82.69%
Black or African American (non-Hispanic)	568	5.45%
Native American	44	0.42%
Asian	337	3.23%
Pacific Islander	43	0.41%
Other/Mixed	498	4.78%
Hispanic or Latino	314	3.01%

98.5% of residents lived in urban areas, while 1.5% lived in rural areas.

There were 4,566 households in Fort Oglethorpe, including 2,240 family households. Of all households, 25.4% had children under the age of 18 living in them, 39.2% were married-couple households, 17.2% had a male householder and no spouse or partner present, and 37.9% had a female householder and no spouse or partner present. About 37.1% of all households were made up of individuals and 17.7% had someone living alone who was 65 years of age or older.

There were 4,909 housing units, of which 7.0% were vacant. The homeowner vacancy rate was 1.4% and the rental vacancy rate was 7.7%.

=== 2024 county distribution ===
Circa 2024, of the Fort Oglethorpe residents, 9,013 of them lived in Catoosa County and 250 of them lived in Walker County.

=== 2000 census ===
As of the 2000 U.S. census, there were 6,940 people, 2,873 households, and 1,881 families residing in the city. The population density was 532.6 inhabitants per square mile (205.6/km^{2}). There were 3,108 housing units at an average density of 238.5 units per square mile (92.1 units/km^{2}). The racial makeup of the city was 93.14% White, 2.38% African American, 0.19% Native American, 2.07% Asian, 0.03% Pacific Islander, 0.56% from other races, and 1.63% from two or more races. Hispanic or Latino of any race were 1.41% of the population.

There were 2,873 households, out of which 29.3% had children under the age of 18 living with them, 47.0% were married couples living together, 15.0% had a female householder with no husband present, and 34.5% were non-families. 30.6% of all households were made up of individuals, and 13.3% had someone living alone who was 65 years of age or older. The average household size was 2.29 and the average family size was 2.86.

In the city, the population was spread out, with 22.8% under the age of 18, 9.5% from 18 to 24, 26.3% from 25 to 44, 21.8% from 45 to 64, and 19.6% 65 years of age or older. The median age was 38 years. For every 100 females, there were 82.2 males. For every 100 females age 18 and over, there were 76.9 males.

The median income for a household in the city was $32,095, and the median income for a family was $40,643. Males had a median income of $28,160 versus $21,141 for females. The per capita income for the city was $16,288. About 11.5% of families and 17.4% of the population were below the poverty line, including 30.8% of those under age 18 and 11.3% of those age 65 or over.

== Education ==
The portion in Catoosa County is in the Catoosa County School District. Lakeview Fort Oglethorpe High School is in the Catoosa County district.

The portion in Walker County is in the Walker County School District.
