= Ringgold High School (Georgia) =

Public high school in Catoosa County, Georgia, United States

Location
- 29 Tiger Trail; Ringgold, Georgia 30736-2024; United States; 34°55′13″N 85°06′34″W

Information
- School type: Public
- Established: 1957
- School district: Catoosa County School District
- CEEB code: 112535
- Principal: JR Jones
- Staff: 85.70 (on an FTE basis)
- Grades: 9-12
- Enrollment: 1,020 (2023-2024)
- Student to teacher ratio: 11.90
- Colors: Blue, white
- Athletics conference: GHSA Div. 3AAA
- Mascot: Tiger
- Rivals: Gordon Lee High School; Lakeview Fort Oglethorpe High School; Heritage High School
- Accreditations: Southern Association of Colleges and Schools; Georgia Accrediting Commission
- Website: rhs.catoosa.k12.ga.us

Ringgold High School is a public four-year comprehensive high school located in Catoosa County, Georgia, United States, in the outskirts of Chattanooga, Tennessee. It serves the community of Ringgold and was the first high school to be founded in Catoosa County.

On April 27, 2011, Ringgold High School was heavily damaged by an EF4 tornado. For the remainder of the 2010–2011 school year, Ringgold students attended Heritage High School in the afternoons while Heritage students attended school in the mornings.

== Athletics ==
The school currently represents Region 7-AA in athletics. Athletics offered at Ringgold include football, baseball, volleyball, boys' basketball, girls' basketball, wrestling, dance team, cheerleading, boys' soccer, girls' soccer, cross country, track & field, boys' golf, girls' golf, softball, boys' tennis, and girls' tennis.
