= Ringgold, Georgia =

- City
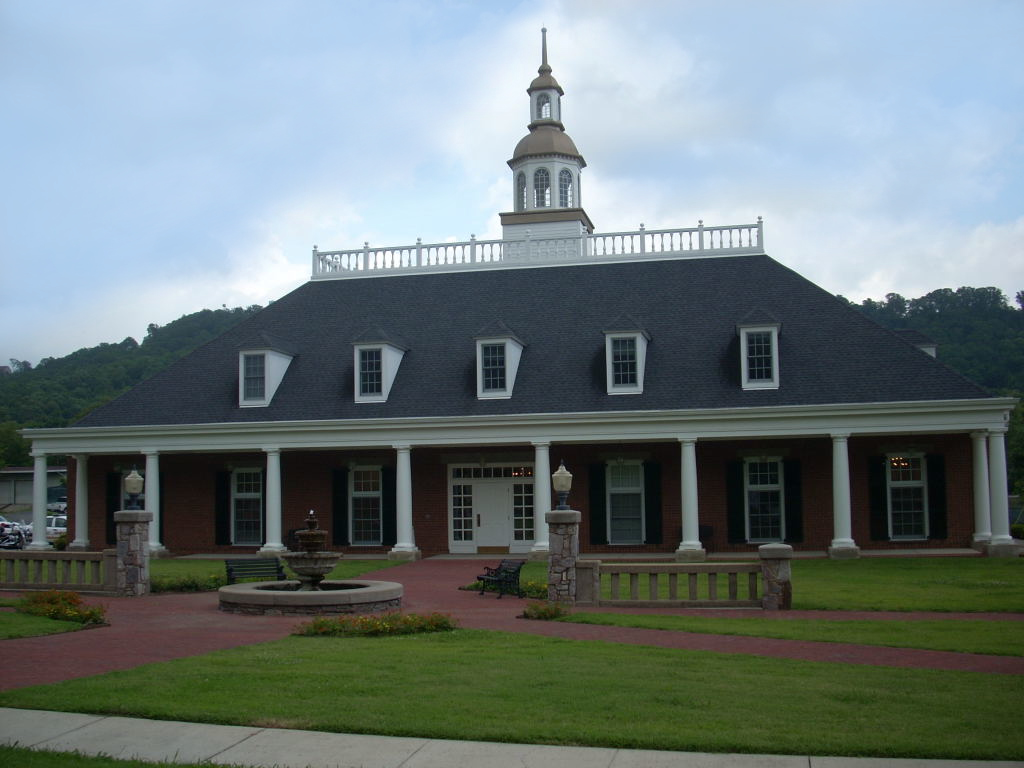
- Ringgold City Hall

- Seal

- Location in Catoosa County and the state of Georgia
- Coordinates: 34°55′2″N 85°6′57″W
- Country: United States
- State: Georgia
- County: Catoosa
- Founded: 1846
- Incorporated (city): 1847
- Named for: Samuel Ringgold

Government
  - Mayor: Kelly Bomar

Area
  - Total: 5.02 sq mi (12.99 km^{2})
  - Land: 5.02 sq mi (12.99 km^{2})
  - Water: 0 sq mi (0.00 km^{2})
- Elevation: 778 ft (237 m)

Population (2020)
  - Total: 3,414
  - Density: 680.5/sq mi (262.76/km^{2})
- Time zone: UTC-5 (Eastern (EST))
  - Summer (DST): UTC-4 (EDT)
- ZIP code: 30736
- Area codes: 706/762
- FIPS code: 13-65324
- GNIS feature ID: 0329441
- Website: cityofringgoldga.gov

Ringgold is a city in and the county seat of Catoosa County, Georgia, United States. Its population was 3,414 at the 2020 census. It is part of the Chattanooga metropolitan area.

== History ==
Ringgold was founded in 1846 and incorporated as a city in 1847. It was named after Samuel Ringgold, a hero of the Battle of Palo Alto in the Mexican–American War.

Ringgold is where The General locomotive stopped during the Great Locomotive Chase on April 12, 1862. Ringgold is also home to the historic Ringgold Depot, which still contains bullet marks from the Civil War.

The Battle of Ringgold Gap took place on November 27, 1863. Confederate Major General Patrick Cleburne with 4,100 men used the mountain pass known as the Ringgold Gap to stall the advance of Union Major General Joseph Hooker and his troops. Hooker's troops were over 12,000 strong. It was a Confederate victory because it allowed Confederate artillery and wagon trains to move safely through the Ringgold Gap unharmed while inflicting high Union casualties.

The Whitman-Anderson House located in Ringgold is listed in the National Register of Historic Places (NRHP). From their house, the Whitman family watched the Battle of Ringgold Gap, during which William Whitman's general store was destroyed. After the Confederates evacuated Ringgold, General Grant requisitioned the Whitman's house as his headquarters. After General Grant moved on, General Sherman ordered the burning of the town of Ringgold, but spared the Whitman house, which remained in the Whitman family until 1902.

Dolly Parton married her husband, Carl Dean, in Ringgold, in May 1966.

On March 14, 2002, a sudden heavy fog played havoc with morning traffic and contributed to one of the worst traffic pileups in history; 125 vehicles crashed on Interstate 75 North and four people died.

=== Tornado ===
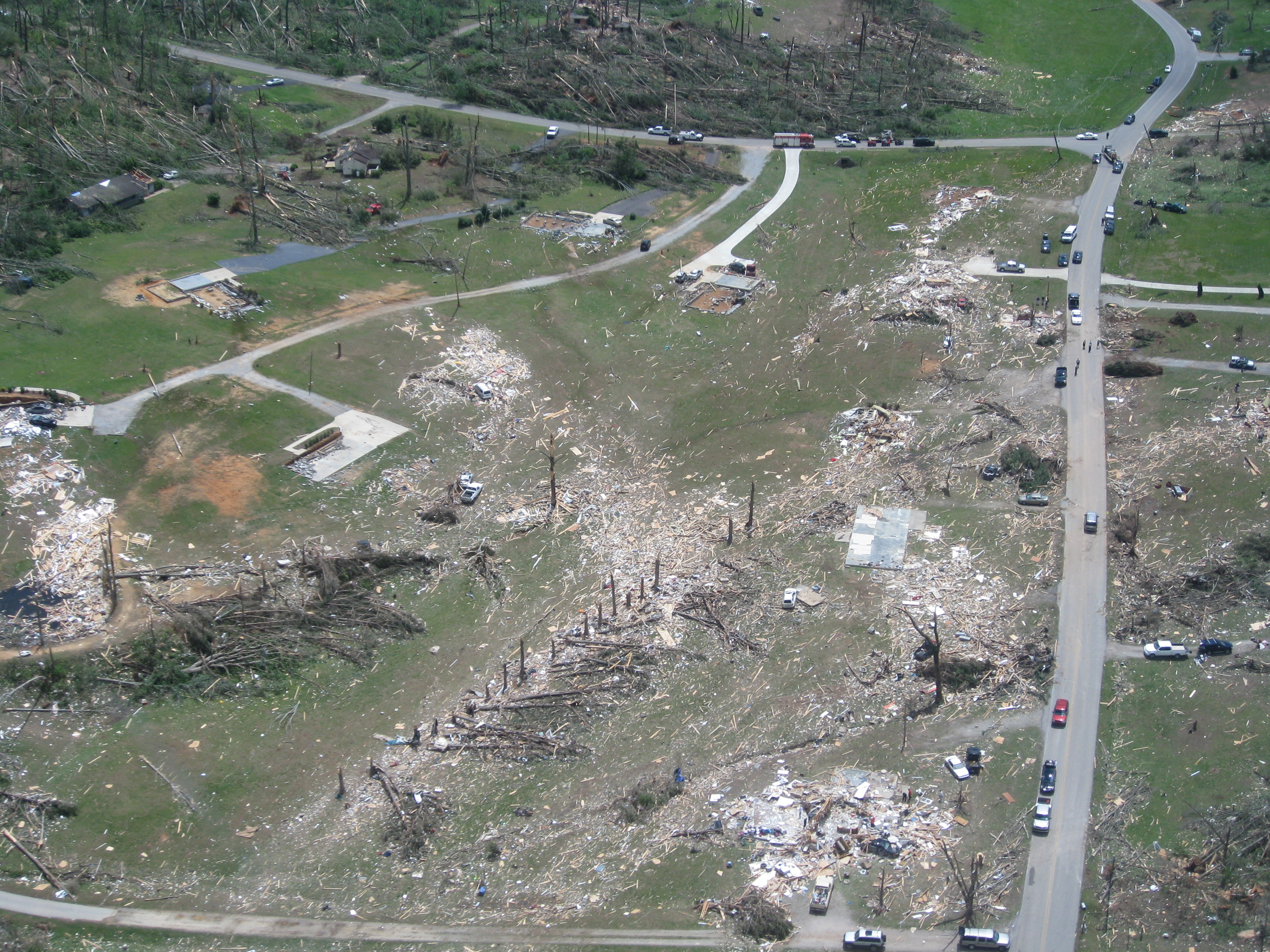
Houses in Ringgold destroyed by an EF4 tornado

On April 27, 2011, an EF4 tornado touched down in Ringgold and Catoosa County, leaving a path of destruction. The tornado killed twenty people along a 48 miles (77 km) path across Catoosa County and over the state line in Hamilton and Bradley counties. Nine people died in Ringgold, including an entire family of four, and an unborn child and at least thirty others were injured. Many homes, businesses, and schools were damaged or destroyed.

== Geography ==
Ringgold is located near the center of Catoosa County at 34°55′2″N 85°6′57″W (34.917170, -85.115698). U.S. Routes 41 and 76 pass through the center of town as Nashville Street, leading northwest 17 miles (27 km) to downtown Chattanooga, Tennessee, and southeast 15 miles (24 km) to Dalton, Georgia. Interstate 75 passes through the southern part of the city with access from 348; the highway leads northwest to Chattanooga and southeast 101 miles (163 km) to Atlanta.

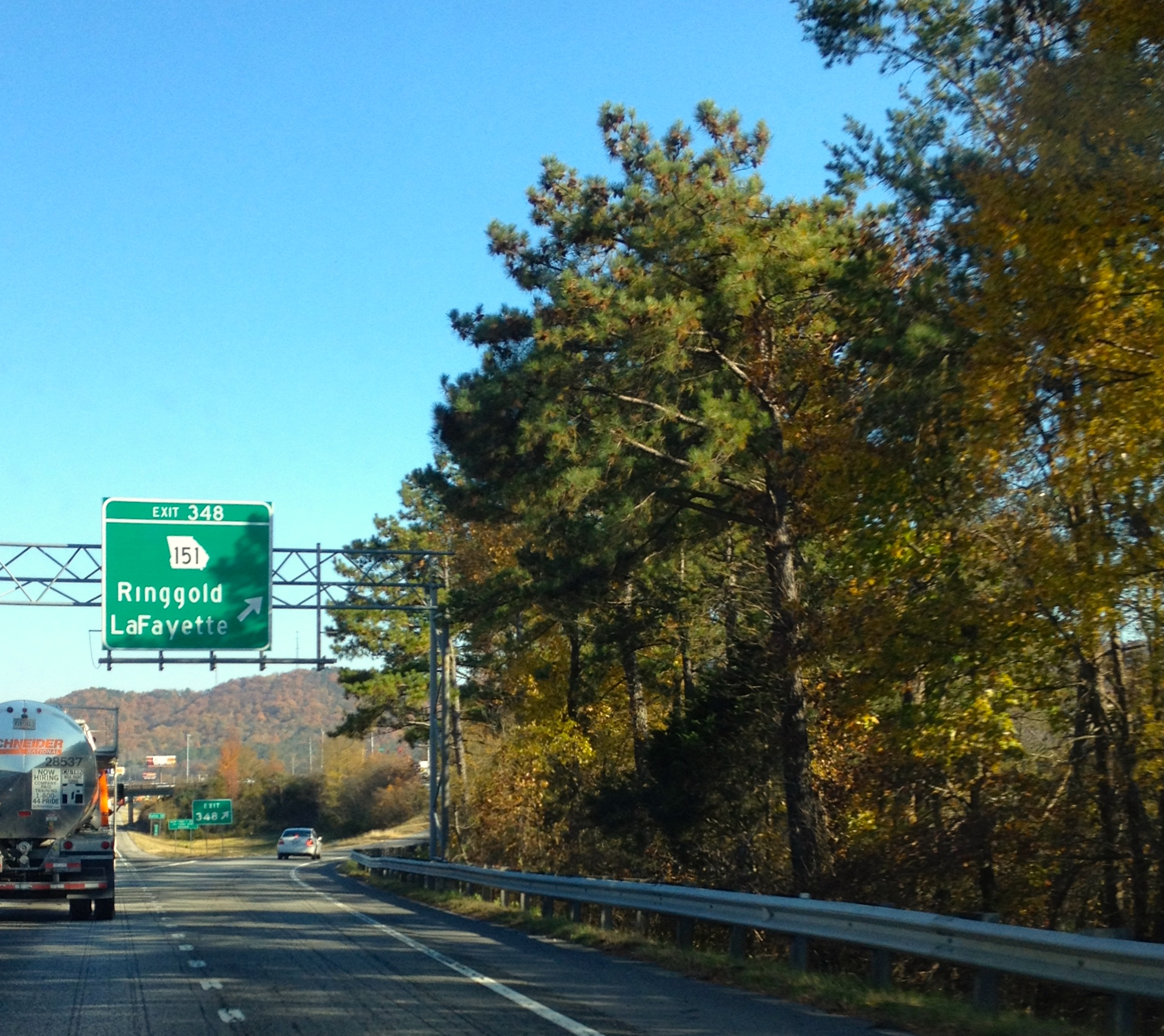
Ringgold, Georgia Exit

According to the United States Census Bureau, the city has a total area of 4.7 square miles (12.3 km^{2}), of which 0.004 square miles (0.01 km^{2}), or 0.11%, is covered by water.

=== Topography ===
Ringgold is situated in the Valley and Ridge geologic province of the Appalachian Mountains, characterized by long north-northeasterly trending ridges separated by valleys. The topography was formed by the erosion of alternating layers of hard and soft sedimentary rock that were folded and faulted during the building of the Appalachians. Taylor Ridge runs through Ringgold; a gap in the ridge is located just east of the city center, with the part of the ridge running to the south called Taylors Ridge and to the north called White Oak Mountain. South Chickamauga Creek, a tributary of the Tennessee River, runs through Ringgold.

=== Climate ===
The climate in this area is characterized by relatively high temperatures and evenly distributed precipitation throughout the year. According to the Köppen climate classification, Ringgold has a humid subtropical climate,Cfa on climate maps.

== Demographics ==
Historical population
Census	Pop.	Note	%±
1870	316		—
1880	436		38.0%
1890	465		6.7%
1900	437		−6.0%
1910	398		−8.9%
1920	472		18.6%
1930	684		44.9%
1940	882		28.9%
1950	1,192		35.1%
1960	1,311		10.0%
1970	1,381		5.3%
1980	1,882		36.3%
1990	1,675		−11.0%
2000	2,422		44.6%
2010	3,580		47.8%
2020	3,414		−4.6%
U.S. Decennial Census

=== 2020 census ===
Ringgold racial composition
Race	Num.	Perc.
White (non-Hispanic)	2,799	81.99%
Black or African American (non-Hispanic)	177	5.18%
Native American	14	0.41%
Asian	56	1.64%
Pacific Islander	6	0.18%
Other/mixed	211	6.18%
Hispanic or Latino	151	4.42%

As of the 2020 census, Ringgold had a population of 3,414. The median age was 39.1 years. 22.2% of residents were under the age of 18 and 19.3% of residents were 65 years of age or older. For every 100 females there were 88.1 males, and for every 100 females age 18 and over there were 81.9 males age 18 and over.

99.8% of residents lived in urban areas, while 0.2% lived in rural areas.

There were 1,515 households in Ringgold, of which 28.3% had children under the age of 18 living in them. Of all households, 36.0% were married-couple households, 18.3% were households with a male householder and no spouse or partner present, and 40.1% were households with a female householder and no spouse or partner present. About 35.3% of all households were made up of individuals and 16.0% had someone living alone who was 65 years of age or older.

There were 1,598 housing units, of which 5.2% were vacant. The homeowner vacancy rate was 0.3% and the rental vacancy rate was 4.0%.

=== 2000 census ===
At the 2000 census, 2,422 people, 1,033 households and 644 families were residing in the city. The population density was 617.0 inhabitants per square mile (238.2/km^{2}). The 1,116 housing units had an average density of 284.3 units per square mile (109.8 units/km^{2}). The racial makeup of the city was 91.33% White, 6.32% African American, 0.25% Native American, 0.50% Asian, 0.58% from other races, and 1.03% from two or more races. Hispanics or Latinos of any race were 1.82% of the population.

Of the 1,033 households, 30.3% had children under18 living with them, 41.6% were married couples living together, 17.1% had a female householder with no husband present, and 37.6% were not families. About 32.5% of all households were made up of individuals, and 13.5% had someone living alone who was 65 or older. The average household size was 2.25 and the average family size was 2.85.

The city's age distribution was 23.9% under 18, 11.6% from 18 to 24, 29.8% from 25 to 44, 19.8% from 45 to 64, and 14.9% 65 or older. The median age was 34 years. For every 100 females, there were 88.9 males. For every 100 females 18 and over, there were 86.7 males.

The median household income was $26,834 and the median family income was $35,132. Males had a median income of $26,943 compared with $21,074 for females. The per capita income was $15,612. About 14.5% of families and 16.7% of the population were below the poverty line, including 26.1% of those under 18 and 6.4% of those 65 or over.

== Education ==
=== Catoosa County Public Schools ===
The Catoosa County Public Schools educates students from preschool to grade 12. As of 2010, the district had 10 elementary schools, three middle schools, and three high schools, with 606 full-time teachers and over 9,809 students.

Ringgold High School is the zoned high school.

In 1954, the Ringgold Elementary School was destroyed in a fire.

== Notable people ==
- Logan Baldwin, professional baseball player
- Edgar William Brown Sr. (1859–1917) physician turned successful businessman in Texas lumber and oil industry
- Austin Davis, professional football player, coach, born in Ringgold
- David Dreyer, American politician
- Stacey Evans, American politician
- Randall Franks American film and TV actor, entertainer, author
- Roy Hawes (1926–2017), professional baseball player, died in Ringgold
- Dewayne Hill, American politician
- Hugh Hill, (1879–1958), professional baseball player, born in Ringgold
- Barbara Leigh (born 1946), actress, born in Ringgold
- McCracken Poston, attorney, author, politician
- O. Wayne Rollins (1912–1991), co-founder of Rollins, Inc.
- Cole Wilcox, professional baseball player, Heritage High School alumnus
