= Catoosa County, Georgia =

County in Georgia, United States

- County
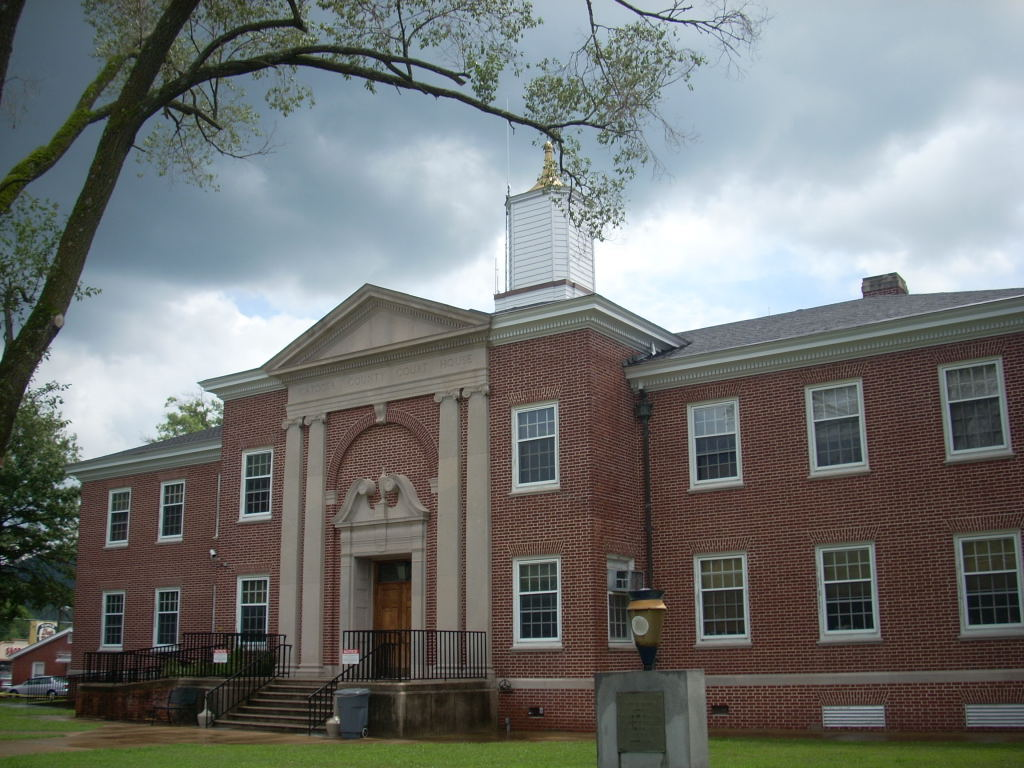
- Catoosa County Courthouse

- Seal Logo

- Location within the U.S. state of Georgia
- Coordinates: 34.90°N 85.14°W
- Country: United States
- State: Georgia
- Founded: 1853; 173 years ago
- Seat: Ringgold
- Largest city: Fort Oglethorpe

Area
  - Total: 162 sq mi (420 km^{2})
  - Land: 162 sq mi (420 km^{2})
  - Water: 0.3 sq mi (0.78 km^{2}) 0.27%

Population (2020)
  - Total: 67,872
  - Estimate (2025): 69,628 ▲
  - Density: 419/sq mi (162/km^{2})
- Time zone: UTC−5 (Eastern)
  - Summer (DST): UTC−4 (EDT)
- Congressional district: 14th
- Website: https://www.catoosacountyga.gov/

Catoosa County is a county in the Northwest region of the U.S. state of Georgia. According to the 2020 census, the population was 67,872. The county seat is Ringgold. The county was created on December 5, 1853. The meaning of the Cherokee language name "Catoosa" is obscure. "Catoosa" may come from the Cherokee words gatusi ("hill", "small mountain" or "high place") or gatu'gitse ("new settlement place").

Catoosa County is part of the Chattanooga, TN–GA Metropolitan Statistical Area.

== History ==
On March 14, 2002, due to a one-time sudden fog, about 125 vehicles crashed, causing a pileup in Interstate 75 that killed four people and injured 39.

On April 27, 2011, a devastating tornado touched down in the town of Ringgold, located in Catoosa County, leaving a path of severe destruction.

== Geography ==
According to the U.S. Census Bureau, the county has a total area of 162 square miles (420 km^{2}), of which 162 square miles (420 km^{2}) is land and 0.3 square miles (0.78 km^{2}) (0.2%) is water. The entire county is located in the Middle Tennessee-Chickamauga sub-basin of the Middle Tennessee-Hiwassee basin.

=== Major highways ===
- Interstate 75 / State Route 401 (unsigned)
- U.S. Route 27 State Route 1
- U.S. Route 41 / U.S. Route 76 / State Route 3
- State Route 2
- State Route 146
- State Route 151
  - State Route 151 Spur

=== Adjacent counties ===
- Hamilton County, Tennessee (north)
- Whitfield County (east)
- Walker County (west)

=== National protected areas ===
- Chattahoochee National Forest (part)
- Chickamauga and Chattanooga National Military Park (part)

== Demographics ==
Historical population
Census	Pop.	Note	%±
1860	5,082		—
1870	4,409		−13.2%
1880	4,739		7.5%
1890	5,431		14.6%
1900	5,823		7.2%
1910	7,184		23.4%
1920	6,677		−7.1%
1930	9,421		41.1%
1940	12,199		29.5%
1950	15,146		24.2%
1960	21,101		39.3%
1970	28,271		34.0%
1980	36,991		30.8%
1990	42,464		14.8%
2000	53,282		25.5%
2010	63,942		20.0%
2020	67,872		6.1%
2025 (est.)	69,628	▲	2.6%
U.S. Decennial Census; 1790-1880 1890-1910; 1920-1930 1930-1940; 1940-1950 1960-1980; 1980-2000 2010 2020

=== Racial and ethnic composition ===
Catoosa County, Georgia – Racial and ethnic composition Note: the US Census treats Hispanic/Latino as an ethnic category. This table excludes Latinos from the racial categories and assigns them to a separate category. Hispanics/Latinos may be of any race.
Race / Ethnicity (NH = Non-Hispanic)	Pop 1980	Pop 1990	Pop 2000	Pop 2010	Pop 2020	% 1980	% 1990	% 2000	% 2010	% 2020
White alone (NH)	36,339	41,664	51,013	59,149	59,280	98.24%	98.12%	95.74%	92.50%	87.34%
Black or African American alone (NH)	289	354	661	1,356	1,808	0.78%	0.83%	1.24%	2.12%	2.66%
Native American or Alaska Native alone (NH)	54	89	159	191	181	0.15%	0.21%	0.30%	0.30%	0.27%
Asian alone (NH)	56	151	370	762	1,025	0.15%	0.36%	0.69%	1.19%	1.51%
Native Hawaiian or Pacific Islander alone (NH)	x	x	10	30	84	x	x	0.02%	0.05%	0.12%
Other race alone (NH)	22	1	15	49	133	0.06%	0.00%	0.03%	0.08%	0.20%
Mixed race or Multiracial (NH)	x	x	433	936	3,020	x	x	0.81%	1.46%	4.45%
Hispanic or Latino (any race)	231	205	621	1,469	2,341	0.62%	0.48%	1.17%	2.30%	3.45%
Total	36,991	42,464	53,282	63,942	67,872	100.00%	100.00%	100.00%	100.00%	100.00%

=== 2020 census ===
As of the 2020 census, there were 67,872 people, 26,300 households, and 17,293 families residing in the county.

Of the residents, 22.7% were under the age of 18 and 18.3% were 65 years of age or older; the median age was 41.0 years. For every 100 females there were 93.7 males, and for every 100 females age 18 and over there were 90.4 males. 76.3% of residents lived in urban areas and 23.7% lived in rural areas.

The racial makeup of the county was 88.3% White, 2.7% Black or African American, 0.4% American Indian and Alaska Native, 1.5% Asian, 0.1% Native Hawaiian and Pacific Islander, 1.3% from some other race, and 5.7% from two or more races. Hispanic or Latino residents of any race comprised 3.4% of the population.

There were 26,300 households in the county, of which 32.3% had children under the age of 18 living with them and 26.4% had a female householder with no spouse or partner present. About 24.4% of all households were made up of individuals and 11.6% had someone living alone who was 65 years of age or older.

There were 27,971 housing units, of which 6.0% were vacant. Among occupied housing units, 72.4% were owner-occupied and 27.6% were renter-occupied. The homeowner vacancy rate was 1.3% and the rental vacancy rate was 5.9%.

=== 2016 ===
As of 2016 the largest self-reported ancestry groups in Catoosa County, Georgia are:

Largest ancestries (2015)	Percent
English (England)	17.6%
American (United States)	17.2%
Irish (Republic of Ireland)	13.2%
German (Germany)	11.7%
Scottish (Scotland)	2.6%
Italian (Italy)	2.3%
Dutch (Netherlands)	1.5%
Scots-Irish (Ulster)	1.5%
French (France)	1.5%
Polish (Poland)	0.8%
Welsh (Wales)	0.6%
Swedish (Sweden)	0.5%
Norwegian (Norway)	0.5%
Danish (Denmark)	0.3%

=== 2010 census ===
According to the 2010 United States census, there were 63,942 people, 24,475 households, and 17,785 families living in the county. The population density was 394.3 inhabitants per square mile (152.2/km^{2}). There were 26,606 housing units at an average density of 164.1 per square mile (63.4/km^{2}). The racial makeup of the county was 93.6% white, 2.2% black or African American, 1.2% Asian, 0.3% American Indian, 0.1% Pacific islander, 1.0% from other races, and 1.6% from two or more races. Those of Hispanic or Latino origin made up 2.3% of the population.

Of the 24,475 households, 36.3% had children under the age of 18 living with them, 55.7% were married couples living together, 12.6% had a female householder with no husband present, 27.3% were non-families, and 23.1% of all households were made up of individuals. The average household size was 2.59 and the average family size was 3.05. The median age was 38.3 years.

The median income for a household in the county was $46,544 and the median income for a family was $54,796. Males had a median income of $39,962 versus $31,505 for females. The per capita income for the county was $22,563. About 8.5% of families and 11.2% of the population were below the poverty line, including 14.8% of those under age 18 and 9.0% of those age 65 or over.

=== 2000 census ===
According to the census of 2000, there were 53,282 people, 20,425 households, and 15,400 families living in the county. The population density was 328 inhabitants per square mile (127/km^{2}). There were 21,794 housing units at an average density of 134 per square mile (52/km^{2}). The racial makeup of the county was 96.39% White, 1.26% Black or African American, 0.31% Native American, 0.71% Asian, 0.02% Pacific Islander, 0.39% from other races, and 0.93% from two or more races; 1.17% of the population were Hispanic or Latino of any race.

There were 20,425 households, of which 35.40% had children under the age of 18 living with them, 60.60% were married couples living together, 11.00% had a female householder with no husband present, and 24.60% were non-families. 21.30% of all households were made up of individuals, and 8.50% had someone living alone who was 65 years of age or older. The average household size was 2.59 and the average family size was 3.00.

In the county, the population was spread out, with 25.80% under the age of 18, 8.10% from 18 to 24, 30.80% from 25 to 44, 23.40% from 45 to 64, and 11.90% who were 65 years of age or older. The median age was 36 years. For every 100 females there were 93.80 males. For every 100 females age 18 and over, there were 90.20 males.

The median income for a household in the county was $39,998, and the median income for a family was $45,710. Males had a median income of $31,746 versus $23,790 for females. The per capita income for the county was $18,009. About 6.40% of families and 9.40% of the population were below the poverty line, including 12.50% of those under age 18 and 11.00% of those age 65 or over.

== Politics ==
As of the 2020s, Catoosa County is a strongly Republican voting county, voting 77% for Donald Trump in 2024. For elections to the United States House of Representatives, Catoosa County is part of Georgia's 14th congressional district, currently represented by Clay Fuller. For elections to the Georgia State Senate, Catoosa County is part of District 53. For elections to the Georgia House of Representatives, Catoosa County is divided by District 2 and District 3.

United States presidential election results for Catoosa County, Georgia
Year	Republican		Democratic		Third party(ies)	
Year	No.	%	No.	%	No.	%
1912	63	13.64%	286	61.90%	113	24.46%
1916	32	3.70%	624	72.06%	210	24.25%
1920	33	37.50%	55	62.50%	0	0.00%
1924	242	25.97%	661	70.92%	29	3.11%
1928	605	51.84%	562	48.16%	0	0.00%
1932	123	11.01%	985	88.18%	9	0.81%
1936	218	17.59%	1,018	82.16%	3	0.24%
1940	249	14.74%	1,440	85.26%	0	0.00%
1944	395	21.37%	1,453	78.63%	0	0.00%
1948	268	17.43%	1,051	68.34%	219	14.24%
1952	1,371	38.10%	2,227	61.90%	0	0.00%
1956	1,336	38.18%	2,163	61.82%	0	0.00%
1960	2,074	49.52%	2,114	50.48%	0	0.00%
1964	4,143	58.59%	2,922	41.32%	6	0.08%
1968	2,043	21.75%	901	9.59%	6,449	68.66%
1972	6,008	87.05%	894	12.95%	0	0.00%
1976	3,799	38.69%	6,020	61.31%	0	0.00%
1980	5,962	53.91%	4,921	44.50%	176	1.59%
1984	7,908	71.91%	3,089	28.09%	0	0.00%
1988	9,319	72.02%	3,588	27.73%	33	0.26%
1992	7,599	51.59%	4,817	32.70%	2,315	15.72%
1996	8,237	55.89%	5,185	35.18%	1,317	8.94%
2000	12,033	67.90%	5,470	30.87%	218	1.23%
2004	16,406	73.43%	5,807	25.99%	128	0.57%
2008	18,218	74.04%	6,025	24.49%	362	1.47%
2012	17,858	75.06%	5,365	22.55%	568	2.39%
2016	20,876	77.49%	4,771	17.71%	1,293	4.80%
2020	25,167	77.14%	6,932	21.25%	527	1.62%
2024	27,150	77.49%	7,704	21.99%	184	0.53%

United States Senate election results for Catoosa County, Georgia2
Year	Republican		Democratic		Third party(ies)	
Year	No.	%	No.	%	No.	%
2020	24,571	76.28%	6,599	20.49%	1,042	3.23%
2020	21,757	59.86%	14,590	40.14%	0	0.00%

United States Senate election results for Catoosa County, Georgia3
Year	Republican		Democratic		Third party(ies)	
Year	No.	%	No.	%	No.	%
2020	13,577	37.82%	6,599	18.38%	15,722	43.80%
2020	21,792	78.45%	5,985	21.55%	0	0.00%
2022	18,562	76.07%	5,282	21.65%	558	2.29%
2022	16,891	77.82%	4,814	22.18%	0	0.00%

Georgia Gubernatorial election results for Catoosa County
Year	Republican		Democratic		Third party(ies)	
Year	No.	%	No.	%	No.	%
2022	20,009	81.66%	4,255	17.37%	239	0.98%

== Education ==
All of Catoosa County is in the Catoosa County Public Schools.

Elementary schools

- Battlefield Elementary School
- Battlefield Primary School
- Boynton Elementary School
- Cloud Springs Elementary School
- Graysville Elementary School
- Ringgold Elementary School
- Ringgold Primary School
- Tiger Creek Elementary School
- West Side Elementary School
- Woodstation Elementary School

Middle schools

- Heritage Middle School
- Lakeview Middle School
- Ringgold Middle School

High schools

- Heritage High School
- Lakeview-Fort Oglethorpe High School
- Ringgold High School
- Performance Learning Center

== Communities ==
=== Cities ===
- Fort Oglethorpe
- Ringgold

=== Town ===
- Tunnel Hill

=== Census-designated places ===
- Indian Springs
- Lakeview

=== Other unincorporated communities ===
- Graysville
- Woodstation

== See also ==
- 2011 Super Outbreak
- List of counties in Georgia
- National Register of Historic Places listings in Catoosa County, Georgia
- Northwest Georgia Joint Development Authority
