= 158th Georgia General Assembly =

Term of state legislature in US state of Georgia

←	157th	159th	→
- Great Seal of the State of Georgia

Overview
- Legislative body: Georgia General Assembly
- Meeting place: Georgia State Capitol

Senate
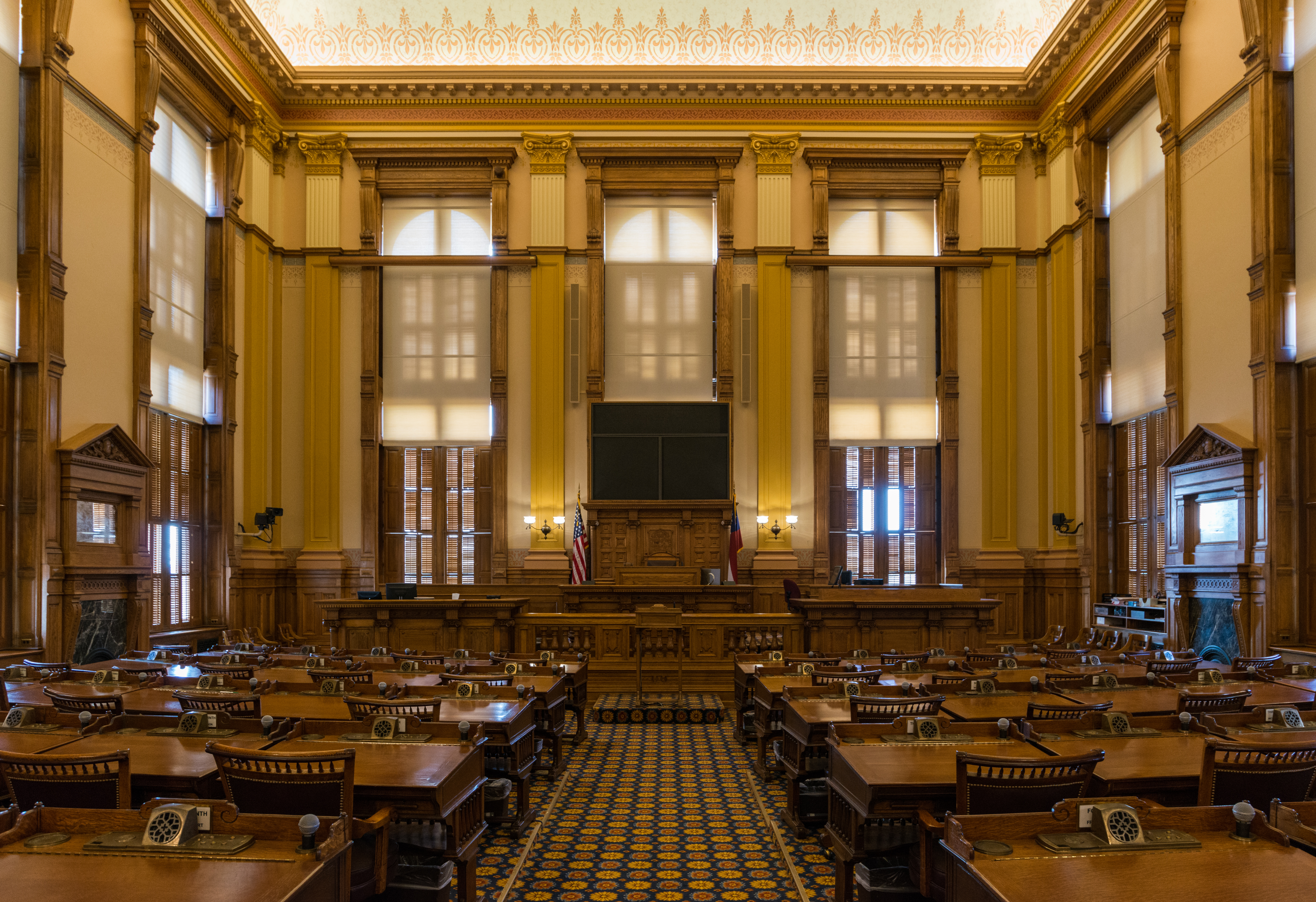
- Members: 56 Senators; Republican (33); Democratic (23); (as of 13 January 2025)
- Senate President: Burt Jones (R)
- Majority leader: Steve Gooch (R)
- Minority leader: Harold V. Jones II (D)
- Party control: Republican Party

House of Representatives
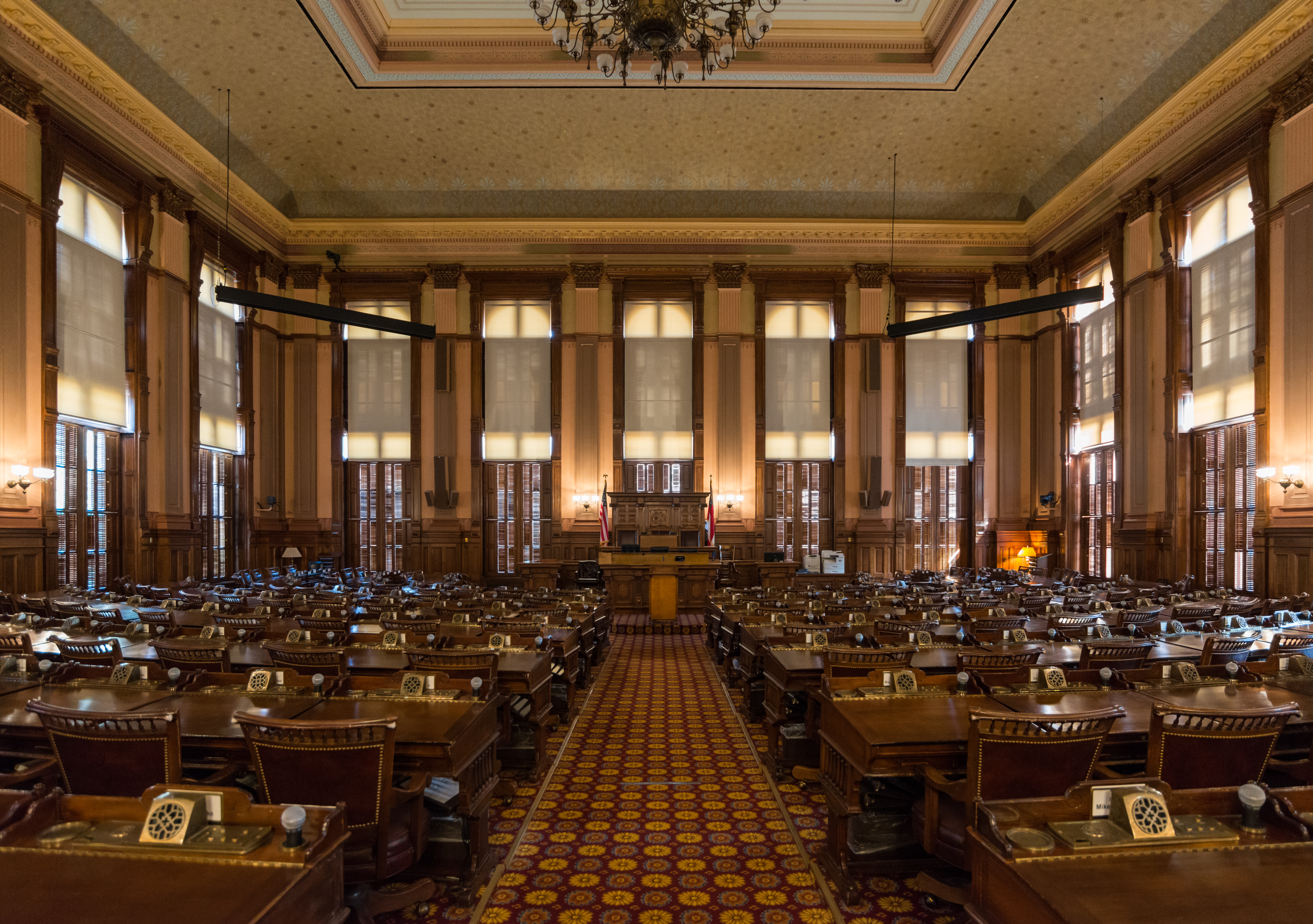
- Members: 180 Representatives; Republican (100); Democratic (80); (as of 13 January 2025)
- Speaker of the House: Jon G. Burns (R)
- House majority leader: Chuck Efstration (R)
- House minority leader: Carolyn Hugley (D)
- Party control: Republican Party

Sessions
- 1st: January 13, 2025 – April 4, 2025

The 158th Georgia General Assembly will consist of two sessions of the Georgia General Assembly in Atlanta, Georgia, United States, the first in 2025 and the second in 2026. The first session began on January 13, 2025.

The Assembly's members were elected in the 2024 State Senate and State House elections. The Senate comprises 33 Republicans and 23 Democrats, while the House is made up of 100 Republicans and 80 Democrats. Overall there are 22 new members: four senators and 18 representatives.

In the Senate, the Democrats elected Harold V. Jones II as Senate minority leader, and House Democrats chose Carolyn Hugley as House minority leader.

== Officers ==
=== State Senate ===
As of January 2025, the majority and minority leadership of the State Senate is as follows:

Office	Officeholder	Party
Lt. Governor and Senate President	Burt Jones	Republican
President pro-tempore	John F. Kennedy	Republican
Majority leader	Steve Gooch	Republican
Majority whip	Randy Robertson	Republican
Majority caucus chair	Jason Anavitarte	Republican
Majority caucus vice-chair	Matt Brass	Republican
Majority caucus secretary	Larry Walker III	Republican
Minority leader	Harold V. Jones II	Democratic
Minority whip	Kim Jackson	Democratic
Minority caucus chair	Elena Parent	Democratic
Minority caucus vice-chair	Sonya Halpern	Democratic
Minority caucus secretary	Nan Orrock	Democratic

=== House of Representatives ===
As of January 2025, the majority and minority leadership of the House of Representatives is as follows:

Office	Officeholder	Party
Speaker of the House	Jon G. Burns	Republican
Speaker pro-tempore	Jan Jones	Republican
Majority leader	Chuck Efstration	Republican
Majority whip	James Burchett	Republican
Majority caucus chair	Bruce Williamson	Republican
Majority caucus vice-chair	Houston Gaines	Republican
Majority caucus secretary/treasurer	Ginny Ehrhart	Republican
Majority caucus chief deputy whip	Rob Leverett	Republican
Minority leader	Carolyn Hugley	Democratic
Minority whip	Sam Park	Democratic
Minority caucus chair	Tanya F. Miller	Democratic
Minority caucus vice-chair	Spencer Frye	Democratic
Minority caucus secretary	Park Cannon	Democratic
Minority caucus treasurer	Solomon Adesanya	Democratic
Minority caucus chief deputy whip	Saira Draper	Democratic

== Composition ==
=== State Senate ===
==== Special elections ====
A special election was held on August 30 to succeed State Senator Brandon Beach, who was appointed by President Donald Trump as U.S. Treasurer. Out of seven candidates, Democrat Debra Shigley and Republican Jason Dickerson advanced to the September 23 runoff, where Dickerson defeated Shigley.

A special election was called for Senate District 35 on November 18 to succeed Jason Esteves. Democratic candidates Jaha Howard and Roger Bruce advanced to the December 16 runoff.

==== Party composition ====
Map of the 2024 State Senate election: Democratic hold Republican hold

Affiliation	Party (Shading indicates majority caucus)			Total	
Affiliation	Republican		Democratic	Total	Vacant
End of 157th (Note: Republican Colton Moore (District 53) removed from Republican caucus September 28, 2023)	32	1	23	56	0
Beginning of 158th Assembly	32	1	23	56	0
May 4, 2025 (Note: Brandon Beach resigned on May 4, 2025 after being appointed as Treasurer of the United States)	31	1	23	55	1
Latest voting share	56.4%	1.8%	41.8%		

==== Membership ====
As of June 2025, the membership of the State Senate is as follows:

District	Senator	Party	Since	Residence
1	Ben Watson	Republican	2015	Savannah
2	Derek Mallow	Democratic	2023	Savannah
3	Mike Hodges	Republican	2023	Brunswick
4	Billy Hickman	Republican	2020	Statesboro
5	Sheikh Rahman	Democratic	2019	Lawrenceville
6	Matt Brass	Republican	2017	Newnan
7	Nabilah Islam	Democratic	2023	Duluth
8	Russ Goodman	Republican	2021	Cogdell
9	Nikki Merritt	Democratic	2021	Grayson
10	Emanuel Jones	Democratic	2005	Decatur
11	Sam Watson	Republican	2023	Moultrie
12	Freddie Sims	Democratic	2009	Dawson
13	Carden Summers	Republican	2020	Cordele
14	Josh McLaurin	Democratic	2023	Sandy Springs
15	Ed Harbison	Democratic	1993	Columbus
16	Marty Harbin	Republican	2015	Tyrone
17	Gail Davenport	Democratic	2011	Jonesboro
18	John F. Kennedy	Republican	2015	Macon
19	Blake Tillery	Republican	2017	Vidalia
20	Larry Walker III	Republican	2015	Perry
21	Vacant			
22	Harold V. Jones II	Democratic	2015	Augusta
23	Max Burns	Republican	2021	Sylvania
24	Lee Anderson	Republican	2017	Grovetown
25	Rick Williams	Republican	2023	Milledgeville
26	David Lucas	Democratic	2013	Macon
27	Greg Dolezal	Republican	2019	Cumming
28	Donzella James	Democratic	2009	Atlanta
29	Randy Robertson	Republican	2019	Cataula
30	Tim Bearden	Republican	2024	Carrollton
31	Jason Anavitarte	Republican	2021	Dallas
32	Kay Kirkpatrick	Republican	2017	Marietta
33	Michael Rhett	Democratic	2015	Marietta
34	Kenya Wicks	Democratic	2025	Fayetteville
35	Jason Esteves	Democratic	2023	Atlanta
36	Nan Orrock	Democratic	2007	Atlanta
37	Ed Setzler	Republican	2023	Acworth
38	RaShaun Kemp	Democratic	2025	Atlanta
39	Sonya Halpern	Democratic	2021	Atlanta
40	Sally Harrell	Democratic	2019	Chamblee
41	Kim Jackson	Democratic	2021	Stone Mountain
42	Brian Strickland	Republican	2018	McDonough
43	Tonya Anderson	Democratic	2017	Lithonia
44	Elena Parent	Democratic	2015	Atlanta
45	Clint Dixon	Republican	2021	Buford
46	Bill Cowsert	Republican	2007	Athens
47	Frank Ginn	Republican	2011	Royston
48	Shawn Still	Republican	2023	Norcross
49	Drew Echols	Republican	2025	Gainesville
50	Bo Hatchett	Republican	2021	Cornelia
51	Steve Gooch	Republican	2011	Dahlonega
52	Chuck Hufstetler	Republican	2013	Rome
53	Colton Moore	Republican	2023	Trenton
54	Chuck Payne	Republican	2017	Dalton
55	Randal Mangham	Democratic	2025	Stone Mountain
56	John Albers	Republican	2011	Roswell

=== House of Representatives ===
==== Special elections ====
A special election was called for House District 106 on November 4 to succeed Shelly Hutchinson. Democratic candidates Marqus Cole and Muhammad Akbar Ali advanced to the December 2 runoff. Ali defeated Cole in a low-turnout contest, becoming the youngest state lawmaker in Georgia's history at 21 years of age.

A special election was called for Georgia's 121st House district on December 9 to succeed Marcus Wiedower. Democratic candidate Eric Gisler and Republican candidate Mack "Dutch" Guest IV filed for the election. Gisler won the special election for Democrats, flipping a seat which had previously voted for Donald Trump in 2024 by 12 percentage points.

A special election was called for Georgia's 23rd House district on December 9 to succeed Mandi Ballinger. Five Republicans and one Democrat filed for the special election. Republican Bill Fincher and Democrat Scott Sanders advanced to the January 6, 2026 runoff.

==== Party composition ====
Map of the 2024 House of Representatives election: Democratic hold Democratic gain Republican hold Republican gain

Affiliation	Party (Shading indicates majority caucus)		Total	
Affiliation	Republican	Democratic	Total	Vacant
End of 157th General Assembly	102	78	180	0
Beginning of 158th General Assembly	100	80	180	0
Latest voting share	56%	44%		

==== Membership ====
As of January 2025, the membership of the House is as follows:

District	Representative	Party	Since	Residence
1	Mike Cameron	Republican	2021	Rossville
2	Steve Tarvin	Republican	2014	Chickamauga
3	Mitchell Horner	Republican	2023	Ringgold
4	Kasey Carpenter	Republican	2017	Dalton
5	Matt Barton	Republican	2019	Calhoun
6	Jason Ridley	Republican	2017	Chatsworth
7	Johnny Chastain	Republican	2023	Blue Ridge
8	Stan Gunter	Republican	2021	Blairsville
9	Will Wade	Republican	2013	Dawsonville
10	Victor Anderson	Republican	2021	Cornelia
11	Rick Jasperse	Republican	2010	Jasper
12	Eddie Lumsden	Republican	2013	Armuchee
13	Katie Dempsey	Republican	2007	Rome
14	Mitchell Scoggins	Republican	2019	Rydal
15	Matthew Gambill	Republican	2019	Cartersville
16	Trey Kelley	Republican	2013	Cedartown
17	Martin Momtahan	Republican	2019	Dallas
18	Tyler Smith	Republican	2021	Bremen
19	Joseph Gullett	Republican	2019	Dallas
20	Charlice Byrd	Republican	2013	Woodstock
21	Brad Thomas	Republican	2013	Holly Springs
22	Jordan Ridley	Republican	2023	Woodstock
23	Mandi Ballinger	Republican	2013	Canton
24	Carter Barrett	Republican	2023	Cumming
25	Todd Jones	Republican	2017	Cumming
26	Lauren McDonald	Republican	2021	Cumming
27	Lee Hawkins	Republican	2013	Gainesville
28	Brent Cox	Republican	2023	Dawsonville
29	Matt Dubnik	Republican	2017	Gainesville
30	Derrick McCollum	Republican	2023	Chestnut Mountain
31	Emory Dunahoo	Republican	2011	Gillsville
32	Chris Erwin	Republican	2023	Homer
33	Alan Powell	Republican	1991	Hartwell
34	Devan Seabaugh	Republican	2021	Marietta
35	Lisa Campbell	Democratic	2023	Kennesaw
36	Ginny Ehrhart	Republican	2019	Powder Springs
37	Mary Frances Williams	Democratic	2019	Marietta
38	David Wilkerson	Democratic	2011	Powder Springs
39	Terry Cummings	Democratic	2023	Mableton
40	Kimberly New	Republican	2023	Villa Rica
41	Michael Smith	Democratic	2013	Marietta
42	Gabriel Sanchez	Democratic	2025	Smyrna
43	Solomon Adesanya	Democratic	2023	Marietta
44	Don Parsons	Republican	1995	Marietta
45	Sharon Cooper	Republican	1997	Marietta
46	John Carson	Republican	2011	Marietta
47	Jan Jones	Republican	2003	Milton
48	Scott Hilton	Republican	2023	Peachtree Corners
49	Chuck Martin	Republican	2003	Alpharetta
50	Michelle Au	Democratic	2021	Johns Creek
51	Esther Panitch	Democratic	2023	Sandy Springs
52	Shea Roberts	Democratic	2021	Atlanta
53	Deborah Silcox	Republican	2023	Sandy Springs
54	Betsy Holland	Democratic	2019	Atlanta
55	Inga Willis	Democratic	2023	Atlanta
56	Bryce Berry	Democratic	2025	Atlanta
57	Stacey Evans	Democratic	2021	Atlanta
58	Park Cannon	Democratic	2016	Atlanta
59	Phil Olaleye	Democratic	2023	Atlanta
60	Sheila Jones	Democratic	2005	Atlanta
61	Mekyah McQueen	Democratic	2025	Smyrna
62	Tanya F. Miller	Democratic	2023	Atlanta
63	Kim Schofield	Democratic	2017	Atlanta
64	Sylvia Wayfer Baker	Democratic	2025	Douglasville
65	Robert Dawson	Democratic	2025	Atlanta
66	Kimberly Alexander	Democratic	2013	Hiram
67	Lydia Glaize	Democratic	2023	Fairburn
68	Derrick Jackson	Democratic	2023	Tyrone
69	Debra Bazemore	Democratic	2017	South Fulton
70	Lynn Smith	Republican	1997	Newnan
71	Jutt Howard	Republican	2025	Carrollton
72	David Huddleston	Republican	2023	Roopville
73	Josh Bonner	Republican	2017	Fayetteville
74	Robert Flournoy	Democratic	2025	Hampton
75	Eric Bell II	Democratic	2023	Jonesboro
76	Sandra Scott	Democratic	2011	Rex
77	Rhonda Burnough	Democratic	2017	Riverdale
78	Demetrius Douglas	Democratic	2013	Stockbridge
79	Yasmin Neal	Democratic	2011	Jonesboro
80	Long Tran	Democratic	2023	Dunwoody
81	Noelle Kahaian	Republican	2025	Locust Grove
82	Karen Mathiak	Republican	2017	Griffin
83	Karen Lupton	Democratic	2023	Chamblee
84	Mary Margaret Oliver	Democratic	2003	Decatur
85	Karla Drenner	Democratic	2001	Avondale Estates
86	Imani Barnes	Democratic	2023	Tucker
87	Viola Davis	Democratic	2019	Stone Mountain
88	Billy Mitchell	Democratic	2003	Stone Mountain
89	Omari Crawford	Democratic	2023	Decatur
90	Saira Draper	Democratic	2023	Atlanta
91	Angela Moore	Democratic	2021	Stonecrest
92	Rhonda Taylor	Democratic	2021	Conyers
93	Doreen Carter	Democratic	2015	Lithonia
94	Karen Bennett	Democratic	2013	Stone Mountain
95	Dar'shun Kendrick	Democratic	2023	Lithonia
96	Arlene Beckles	Democratic	2025	Norcross
97	Ruwa Romman	Democratic	2023	Duluth
98	Marvin Lim	Democratic	2021	Norcross
99	Matt Reeves	Republican	2023	Duluth
100	David Clark	Republican	2015	Buford
101	Scott Holcomb	Democratic	2011	Atlanta
102	Gabe Okoye	Democratic	2017	Lawrenceville
103	Soo Hong	Republican	2023	Lawrenceville
104	Chuck Efstration	Republican	2013	Mulberry
105	Sandy Donatucci	Republican	2025	Buford
106	Shelly Hutchinson	Democratic	2019	Snellville
107	Sam Park	Democratic	2023	Lawrenceville
108	Jasmine Clark	Democratic	2019	Lilburn
109	Dewey McClain	Democratic	2023	Lawrenceville
110	Segun Adeyina	Democratic	2023	Grayson
111	Reynaldo Martinez	Republican	2023	Loganville
112	Bruce Williamson	Republican	2023	Monroe
113	Sharon Henderson	Democratic	2021	Covington
114	Tim Fleming	Republican	2023	Covington
115	Regina Lewis-Ward	Democratic	2023	McDonough
116	El-Mahdi Holly	Democratic	2023	Stockbridge
117	Mary Ann Santos	Democratic	2025	McDonough
118	Clint Crowe	Republican	2023	Jackson
119	Holt Persinger	Republican	2023	Winder
120	Houston Gaines	Republican	2019	Athens
121	Marcus Wiedower	Republican	2019	Watkinsville
122	Spencer Frye	Democratic	2013	Athens
123	Rob Leverett	Republican	2023	Elberton
124	Trey Rhodes	Republican	2015	Greensboro
125	Gary Richardson	Republican	2024	Evans
126	L.C. Myles	Democratic	2025	Hephzibah
127	Mark Newton	Republican	2023	Augusta
128	Mack Jackson	Democratic	2009	Sandersville
129	Karlton Howard	Democratic	2023	Augusta
130	Lynn Gladney	Democratic	2023	Augusta
131	Rob Clifton	Republican	2025	Evans
132	Brian Prince	Democratic	2023	Augusta
133	Danny Mathis	Republican	2019	Cochran
134	Robert Dickey	Republican	2011	Musella
135	Beth Camp	Republican	2021	Concord
136	David Jenkins	Republican	2021	Grantville
137	Debbie Buckner	Democratic	2003	Junction City
138	Vance Smith	Republican	2019	Pine Mountain
139	Carmen Rice	Republican	2024	Fortson
140	Tremaine Teddy Reese	Democratic	2023	Columbus
141	Carolyn Hugley	Democratic	1993	Columbus
142	Miriam Paris	Democratic	2017	Macon
143	Anissa Jones	Democratic	2025	Macon
144	Dale Washburn	Republican	2019	Macon
145	Tangie Herring	Democratic	2025	Macon
146	Shaw Blackmon	Republican	2015	Bonaire
147	Bethany Ballard	Republican	2023	Warner Robins
148	Noel Williams Jr.	Republican	2019	Cordele
149	Floyd Griffin	Democratic	2025	Milledgeville
150	Patty Marie Stinson	Democratic	2013	Butler
151	Mike Cheokas	Republican	2023	Americus
152	Bill Yearta	Republican	2019	Sylvester
153	David Sampson	Democratic	2023	Albany
154	Gerald Greene	Republican	2023	Cuthbert
155	Matt Hatchett	Republican	2023	Dublin
156	Leesa Hagan	Republican	2021	Lyons
157	Bill Werkheiser	Republican	2015	Glennville
158	Butch Parrish	Republican	1985	Swainsboro
159	Jon G. Burns	Republican	2005	Newington
160	Lehman Franklin	Republican	2023	Statesboro
161	Bill Hitchens	Republican	2013	Rincon
162	Carl Gilliard	Democratic	2016	Garden City
163	Anne Allen Westbrook	Democratic	2023	Savannah
164	Ron Stephens	Republican	1997	Richmond Hill
165	Edna Jackson	Democratic	2021	Savannah
166	Jesse Petrea	Republican	2015	Savannah
167	Buddy DeLoach	Republican	2021	Townsend
168	Al Williams	Democratic	2003	Midway
169	Angie O'Steen	Republican	2025	Ambrose
170	Jaclyn Ford	Republican	2025	Tifton
171	Joe Campbell	Republican	2020	Camilla
172	Charles Cannon	Republican	2023	Moultrie
173	Darlene Taylor	Republican	2011	Thomasville
174	John Corbett	Republican	2015	Lake Park
175	John LaHood	Republican	2018	Valdosta
176	James Burchett	Republican	2019	Waycross
177	Dexter Sharper	Democratic	2013	Valdosta
178	Steven Meeks	Republican	2019	Screven
179	Rick Townsend	Republican	2023	St. Simons
180	Steven Sainz	Republican	2019	St. Marys

== See also ==
- List of Georgia state legislatures
