= 157th Georgia General Assembly =

Term of state legislature in US state of Georgia

←	156th	158th	→
- Great Seal of the State of Georgia

Overview
- Legislative body: Georgia General Assembly
- Meeting place: Georgia State Capitol

Senate
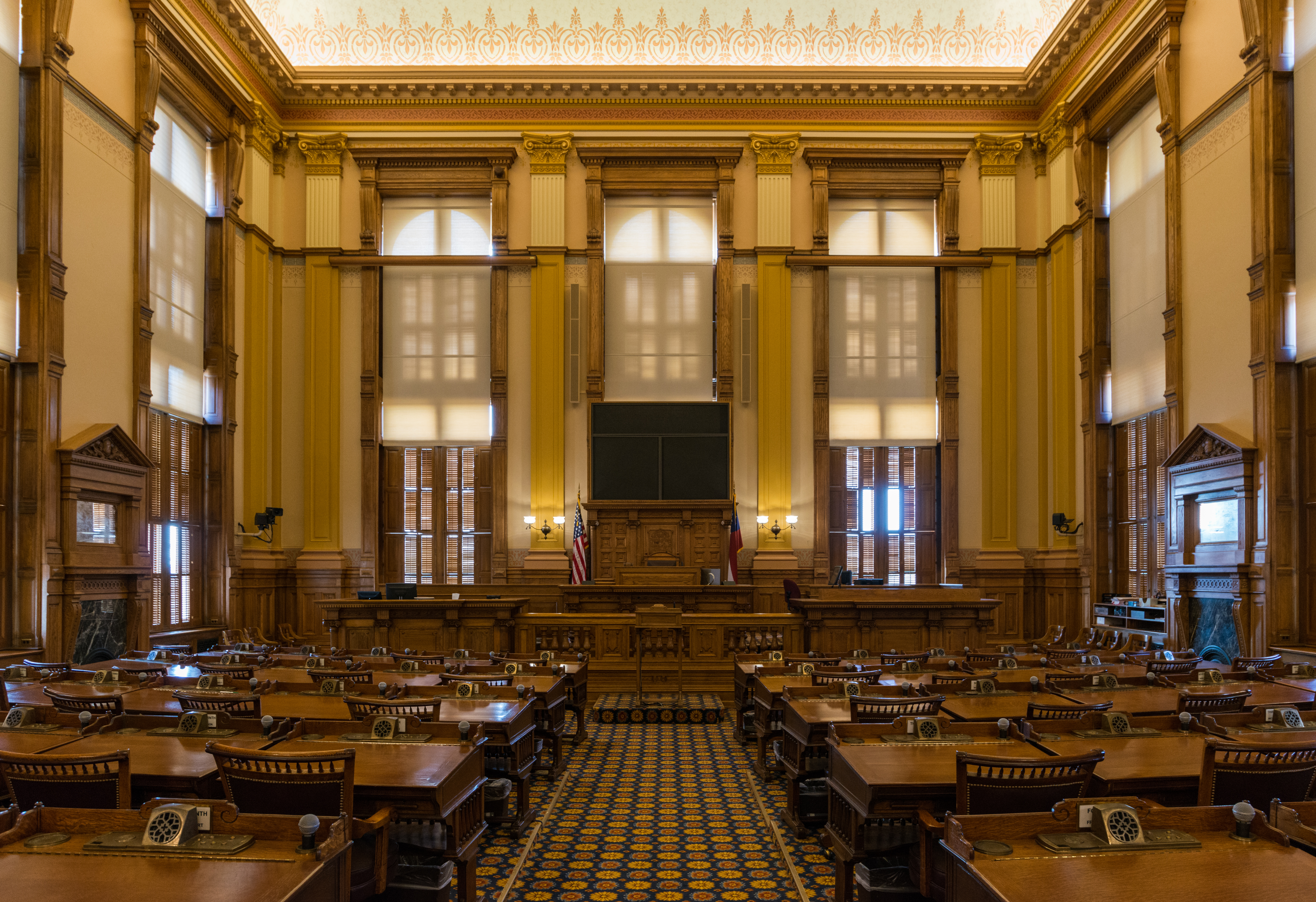
- Members: 56 Senators; Republican (33); Democratic (23); (as of 8 March 2023)
- Senate President: Burt Jones (R)
- Party control: Republican Party

House of Representatives
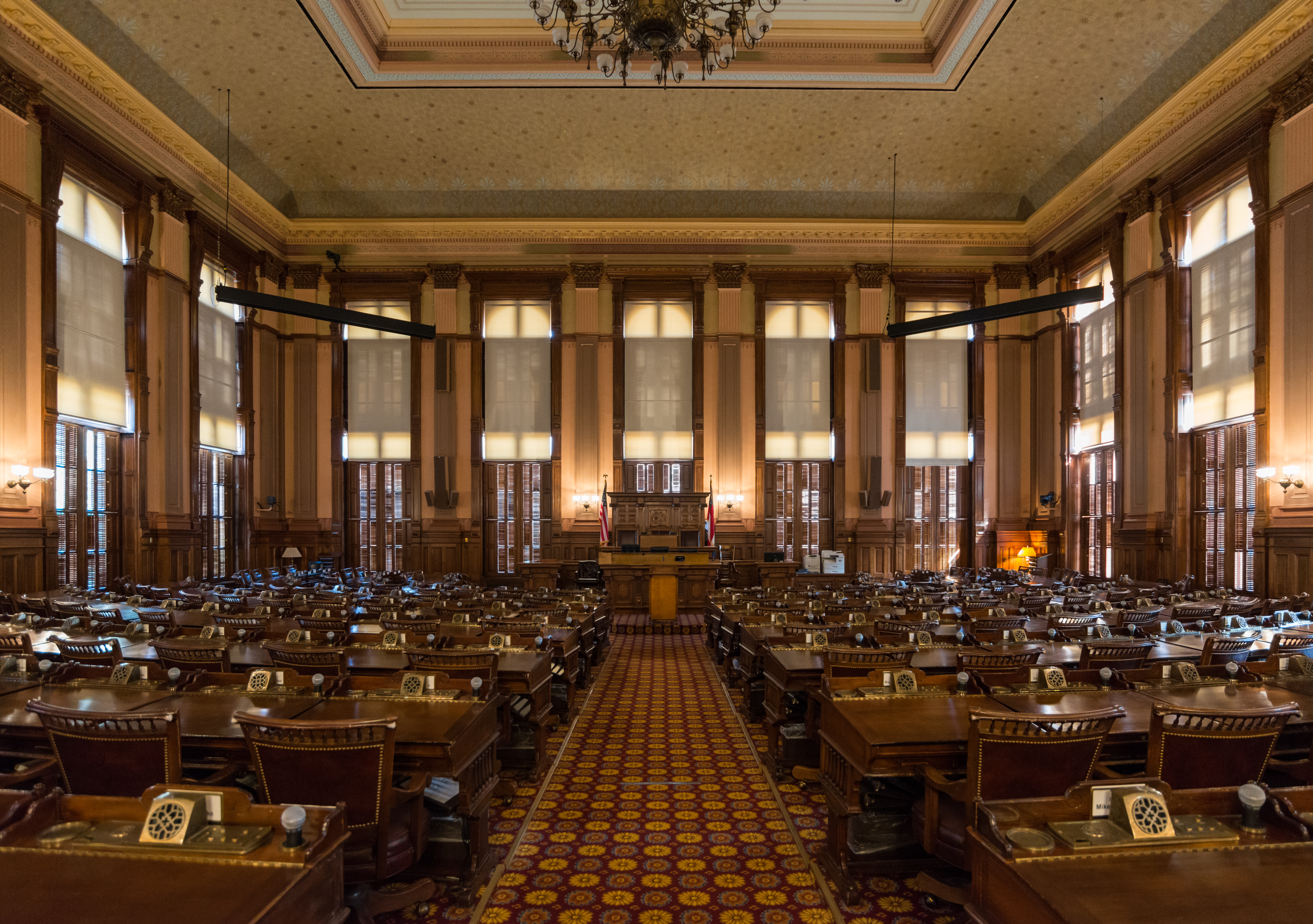
- Members: 180 Representatives; Republican (101); Democratic (77); Vacant (2); (as of 8 March 2023)
- Speaker of the House: Jon G. Burns (R)
- Party control: Republican Party

Sessions
- 1st: January 9, 2023 – March 29, 2023
- 2nd: January 8, 2024 – April 28, 2024

Special sessions
- Redistricting: November 28, 2023 – December 7, 2023

The 157th Georgia General Assembly consisted of two sessions of the Georgia General Assembly in Atlanta, Georgia, United States, the first in 2023 and the second in 2024. It convened its first session on January 9, 2023 at the Georgia State Capitol in Atlanta, which adjourned sine die on March 29; as stipulated in the Constitution of Georgia, the General Assembly can only hold a session "for a period of no longer than 40 days in the aggregate each year".

The Assembly's members were elected in the 2022 State Senate and State House elections.

On October 26, 2023, a special session was called by Governor Brian Kemp for November 28, 2023, to redraw congressional and legislative maps which were approved in the previous General Assembly.

During the first session, March 6, 2023 was "Crossover Day", the informal name for the date by which bills must have passed through one chamber in order to remain on track to become law.

== Activity ==
Governor Brian Kemp's floor leaders for the 2023 and 2024 sessions are senators Bo Hatchett and Mike Hodges, and representatives Matthew Gambill, Soo Hong, Lauren McDonald, and Will Wade.

=== Legislation ===
In late January 2023, Democratic lawmakers Sally Harrell and Shea Roberts introduced twin bills — S.B. 15 and H.B. 75, both described as "long-shot legislation" by the Atlanta Journal-Constitution — that would repeal Georgia's 2019 anti-abortion law and add abortion protections to the Official Code of Georgia Annotated.

Representative John Carson sponsored H.B. 54, to increase Georgia's Qualified Education Expense Credit program cap from $120 million to $200 million.

Representative Darlene Taylor (R-Thomasville) introduced the Okefenokee Protection Act (H.B. 71), intended to help protect the Okefenokee National Wildlife Refuge from mining projects. The bill attracted bipartisan support from Buddy DeLoach and Mary Frances Williams, among about 36 others. Taylor had filed an ultimately unsuccessful similar bill in the previous assembly.

==== Sports betting ====
Sports betting was federally banned in the US by the Professional and Amateur Sports Protection Act of 1992 until the Supreme Court struck down the law in Murphy v. National Collegiate Athletic Association (2018), allowing each state to regulate sports gambling. Governor Kemp had been opposed to legalizing betting in the past, but changed his position in 2023.

Several bills regarding sports betting were introduced during the 2023 session.

=== Post-sine die ===
Governor Brian Kemp issued his first veto of the 2023 session on April 4, putting a stop to H.B. 319, which would have required the General Assembly to approve any University System of Georgia tuition hikes of over 3%. Kemp issued a statement noting that the "Georgia Constitution makes plain the authority to govern, control, and manage the University System and all system institutions is vested in the Board of Regents". (Note: Ga. Const. art. VIII, § IV, para. (b).) H.B. 319 had passed the House by a vote of 160–1 and the Senate unanimously; the tuition measure had been added on the last day of the legislative session to the bill, which originally aimed to abolish the Georgia Higher Education Assistance Corporation.

On October 26, 2023, a special session was called by Governor Brian Kemp for November 28, 2023, to redraw congressional and legislative maps which were approved in the previous General Assembly, following a ruling earlier in the day federal district judge Steve C. Jones that some districts in the U.S. House, Georgia Senate and Georgia House violated the Voting Rights Act.

== Composition ==
The lawmakers comprising the 157th Assembly were the most diverse in Georgia's history. The Atlanta Journal-Constitution counted 83 non-white members out of 236; 151 are white, 68 are black, 8 are AAPI, five are Hispanic, two are Afro-Latino, and one is Arab. Additionally, there were 81 women in the chamber.

=== State Senate ===
==== Special elections ====
Governor Brian Kemp chose state senator Dean Burke to be chief medical officer of the Georgia Department of Community Health in December 2022. Burke resigned on December 31, and an election to fill the Senate District 11 seat was scheduled for January 31, 2023. Three candidates qualified for the election: John H. Monds (L), Sam Watson (R), and Mary Weaver-Anderson (D). Watson won the election easily.

==== Party composition ====
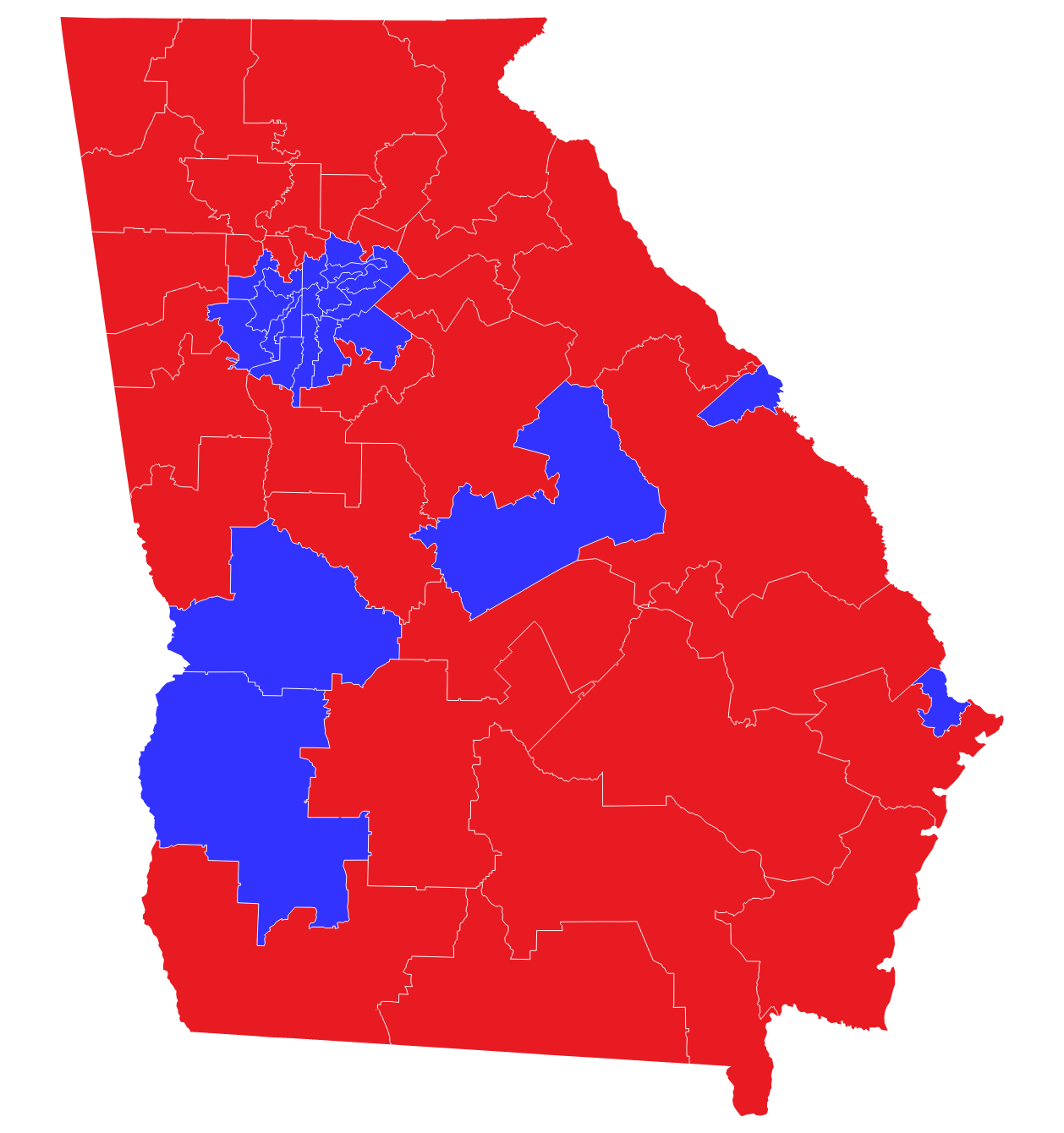
Map of current partisan composition of legislative districts for the State Senate: Democratic senator Republican senator

Affiliation	Party (Shading indicates majority caucus)		Total	
Affiliation	Republican	Democratic	Total	Vacant
End of 155th Assembly	35	21	56	0
End of 156th Assembly	34	22	56	0
Beginning of 157th Assembly	33	23	56	0
Latest voting share	59%	41%		

==== Membership ====
As of March 2023, the Georgia State Senate is composed of 56 members:

District	Senator	Party	Since	Residence
1	Ben Watson	Republican	2015	Savannah
2	Derek Mallow	Democratic	2023	Savannah
3	Mike Hodges	Republican	2023	Brunswick
4	Billy Hickman	Republican	2020	Statesboro
5	Sheikh Rahman	Democratic	2019	Lawrenceville
6	Jason Esteves	Democratic	2023	Atlanta
7	Nabilah Islam	Democratic	2023	Lawrenceville
8	Russ Goodman	Republican	2021	Cogdell
9	Nikki Merritt	Democratic	2021	Grayson
10	Emanuel Jones	Democratic	2005	Ellenwood
11	Sam Watson	Republican	2023	Moultrie
12	Freddie Sims	Democratic	2009	Dawson
13	Carden Summers	Republican	2020	Cordele
14	Josh McLaurin	Democratic	2023	Sandy Springs
15	Ed Harbison	Democratic	1993	Columbus
16	Marty Harbin	Republican	2015	Tyrone
17	Brian Strickland	Republican	2018	McDonough
18	John F. Kennedy	Republican	2015	Macon
19	Blake Tillery	Republican	2017	Vidalia
20	Larry Walker III	Republican	2015	Kathleen
21	Brandon Beach	Republican	2013	Alpharetta
22	Harold V. Jones II	Democratic	2015	Augusta
23	Max Burns	Republican	2021	Sylvania
24	Lee Anderson	Republican	2017	Grovetown
25	Rick Williams	Republican	2023	Milledgeville
26	David Lucas	Democratic	2013	Macon
27	Greg Dolezal	Republican	2019	Cumming
28	Matt Brass	Republican	2017	Newnan
29	Randy Robertson	Republican	2019	Cataula
30	Mike Dugan	Republican	2013	Carrollton
31	Jason Anavitarte	Republican	2021	Dallas
32	Kay Kirkpatrick	Republican	2017	Marietta
33	Michael Rhett	Democratic	2015	Marietta
34	Valencia Seay	Democratic	2003	Riverdale
35	Donzella James	Democratic	2009	College Park
36	Nan Orrock	Democratic	2007	Atlanta
37	Ed Setzler	Republican	2023	Acworth
38	Horacena Tate	Democratic	1999	Atlanta
39	Sonya Halpern	Democratic	2021	Atlanta
40	Sally Harrell	Democratic	2019	Chamblee
41	Kim Jackson	Democratic	2021	Stone Mountain
42	Elena Parent	Democratic	2015	Atlanta
43	Tonya Anderson	Democratic	2017	Lithonia
44	Gail Davenport	Democratic	2011	Jonesboro
45	Clint Dixon	Republican	2021	Buford
46	Bill Cowsert	Republican	2007	Athens
47	Frank Ginn	Republican	2011	Royston
48	Shawn Still	Republican	2023	Norcross
49	Shelly Echols	Republican	2023	Alto
50	Bo Hatchett	Republican	2021	Cornelia
51	Steve Gooch	Republican	2011	Dahlonega
52	Chuck Hufstetler	Republican	2013	Rome
53	Colton Moore	Republican	2023	Trenton
54	Chuck Payne	Republican	2017	Dalton
55	Gloria Butler	Democratic	1999	Stone Mountain
56	John Albers	Republican	2011	Roswell

=== House of Representatives ===
==== Special elections ====
After former speaker David Ralston's resignation and death, a special election was held on January 3, 2023 to fill the seat in House District 7. Since no candidate reached a vote threshold of 50%, (Note: Sheree Ralston got 3,582 votes (45.02%), and Johnny Chastain got 3,125 votes (39.28%).) a runoff between Sheree Ralston, David Ralston's widow, and Johnny Chastain — both members of the Fannin County Development Authority — was held on January 31, 2023; in an upset, Chastain defeated Ralston.

House District 119's previous representative Terry England did not seek reelection in 2022. After winning unopposed in the general election, former Barrow County Chamber of Commerce chair Danny Rampey was arrested in December 2022 and charged with stealing prescription medications. Bowing to pressure from the state Republican party, Rampey announced he would not take office, and Governor Kemp scheduled a special election to be held on January 31, 2023. No candidate won a majority of the vote, so a runoff was held on February 28 between Republicans Holt Persinger and Charlie Chase; Persinger won the runoff.

State representative Sam Watson resigned from his seat in House District 172 in order to run for the newly-open spot in State Senate District 11. A special election was held on January 31, 2023; the only candidate to qualify for the ballot was Colquitt County administrator Charles Cannon.

Democratic member Mike Glanton of District 75 resigned on January 24, 2023 for health reasons; a special election was held on March 21, 2023 to fill the seat. Eric Bell II was elected to fill the seat.

Democratic representative Tish Naghise died on March 8, 2023; she had represented the 68th District. Former Representative Derrick Jackson was elected to fill the seat.

==== Party composition ====
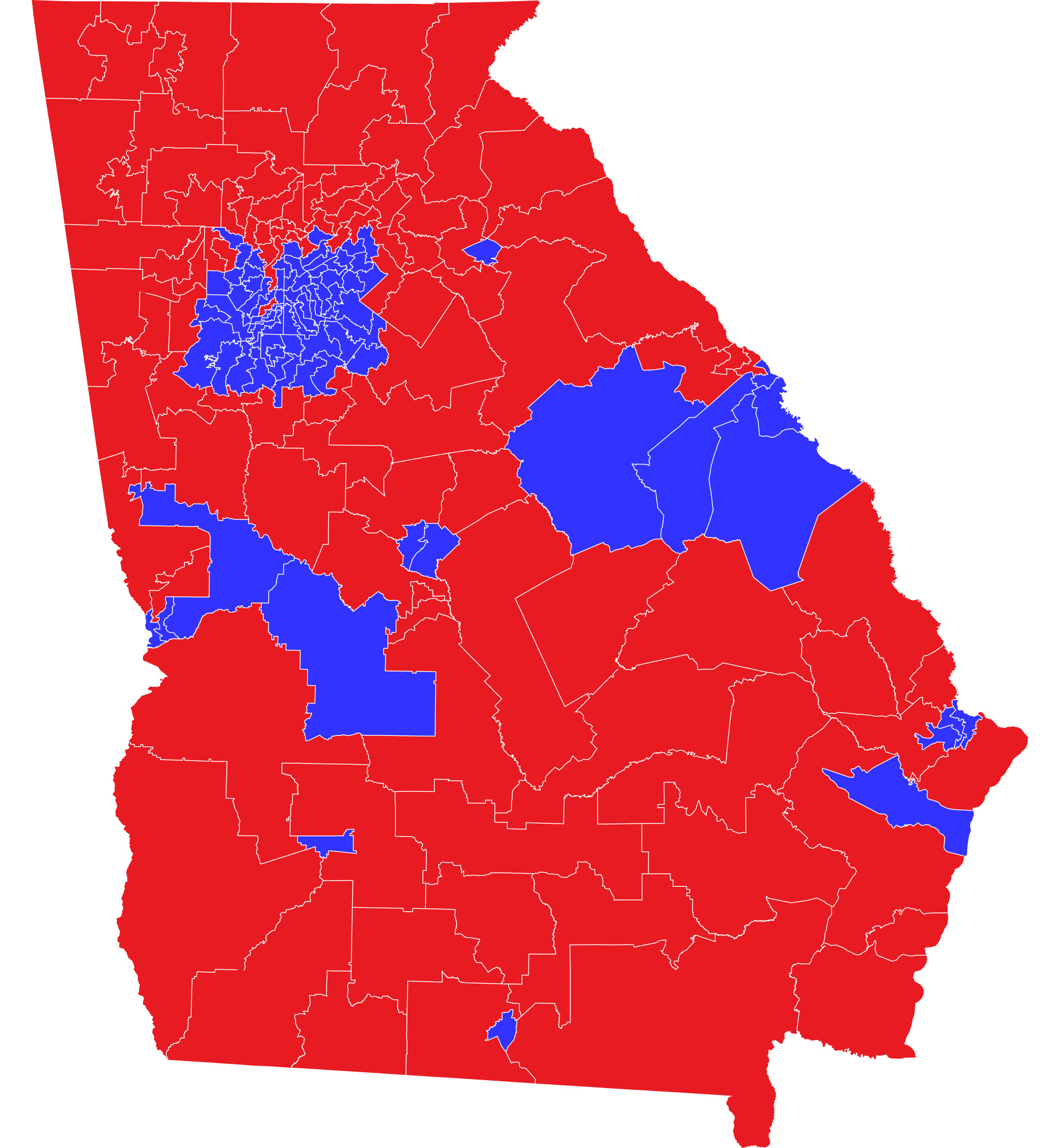
Map of partisan composition of the Georgia House of Representatives as of July 13, 2023: Democratic representative Republican representative Vacant

Affiliation	Party (Shading indicates majority caucus)		Total	
Affiliation	Republican	Democratic	Total	Vacant
End of 155th General Assembly	105	74	179	1 (Note: Rep. Pam Stephenson resigned on September 10, 2020 and remained on the ballot in the 2020 general election unopposed. The seat is still vacant at the beginning of the 156th General Assembly pending a special election.)
End of 156th General Assembly	103	76	179	1
Beginning of 157th General Assembly	101	79	180	0
July 11, 2023	102	78	180	0
Latest voting share	57%	43%		

==== Membership ====
As of July 2023, the membership of the House is as follows:

District	Representative	Party	Since	Residence
1	Mike Cameron	Republican	2021	Rossville
2	Steve Tarvin	Republican	2014	Chickamauga
3	Mitchell Horner	Republican	2023	Ringgold
4	Kasey Carpenter	Republican	2017	Dalton
5	Matt Barton	Republican	2019	Calhoun
6	Jason Ridley	Republican	2017	Chatsworth
7	Johnny Chastain	Republican	2023	Blue Ridge
8	Stan Gunter	Republican	2021	Blairsville
9	Will Wade	Republican	2013	Dawsonville
10	Victor Anderson	Republican	2021	Cornelia
11	Rick Jasperse	Republican	2010	Jasper
12	Eddie Lumsden	Republican	2013	Rome
13	Katie Dempsey	Republican	2007	Rome
14	Mitchell Scoggins	Republican	2019	Rydal
15	Matthew Gambill	Republican	2019	Cartersville
16	Trey Kelley	Republican	2013	Cedartown
17	Martin Momtahan	Republican	2019	Dallas
18	Tyler Smith	Republican	2021	Bremen
19	Joseph Gullett	Republican	2019	Dallas
20	Charlice Byrd	Republican	2013	Woodstock
21	Brad Thomas	Republican	2013	Woodstock
22	Jordan Ridley	Republican	2023	Woodstock
23	Mandi Ballinger	Republican	2013	Canton
24	Carter Barrett	Republican	2023	Cumming
25	Todd Jones	Republican	2017	Cumming
26	Lauren McDonald	Republican	2021	Cumming
27	Lee Hawkins	Republican	2013	Gainesville
28	Brent Cox	Republican	2023	Dawsonville
29	Matt Dubnik	Republican	2017	Gainesville
30	Derrick McCollum	Republican	2023	Chestnut Mountain
31	Emory Dunahoo	Republican	2011	Gillsville
32	Chris Erwin	Republican	2023	Homer
33	Alan Powell	Republican	1991	Hartwell
34	Devan Seabaugh	Republican	2021	Marietta
35	Lisa Campbell	Democratic	2023	Kennesaw
36	Ginny Ehrhart	Republican	2019	Powder Springs
37	Mary Frances Williams	Democratic	2019	Marietta
38	David Wilkerson	Democratic	2011	Powder Springs
39	Terry Cummings	Democratic	2023	Mableton
40	Doug Stoner	Democratic	2023	Smyrna
41	Michael Smith	Democratic	2013	Marietta
42	Teri Anulewicz	Democratic	2017	Smyrna
43	Solomon Adesanya	Democratic	2023	Marietta
44	Don Parsons	Republican	1995	Marietta
45	Sharon Cooper	Republican	1997	Marietta
46	John Carson	Republican	2011	Roswell
47	Jan Jones	Republican	2003	Alpharetta
48	Scott Hilton	Republican	2023	Peachtree Corners
49	Chuck Martin	Republican	2003	Alpharetta
50	Michelle Au	Democratic	2021	Johns Creek
51	Esther Panitch	Democratic	2023	Sandy Springs
52	Shea Roberts	Democratic	2021	Sandy Springs
53	Deborah Silcox	Republican	2023	Sandy Springs
54	Betsy Holland	Democratic	2019	Atlanta
55	Inga Willis	Democratic	2023	Atlanta
56	Mesha Mainor	Republican	2021	Atlanta
57	Stacey Evans	Democratic	2021	Atlanta
58	Park Cannon	Democratic	2016	Atlanta
59	Phil Olaleye	Democratic	2023	Atlanta
60	Sheila Jones	Democratic	2005	Atlanta
61	Roger Bruce	Democratic	2003	Atlanta
62	Tanya F. Miller	Democratic	2023	Atlanta
63	Kim Schofield	Democratic	2017	Atlanta
64	Kimberly New	Republican	2023	Villa Rica
65	Mandisha Thomas	Democratic	2021	Atlanta
66	Kimberly Alexander	Democratic	2013	Douglasville
67	Lydia Glaize	Democratic	2023	Fairburn
68	Derrick Jackson	Democratic	2023	Tyrone
69	Debra Bazemore	Democratic	2017	South Fulton
70	Lynn Smith	Republican	1997	Newnan
71	J. Collins	Republican	2017	Villa Rica
72	David Huddleston	Republican	2023	Roopville
73	Josh Bonner	Republican	2017	Fayetteville
74	Karen Mathiak	Republican	2023	Griffin
75	Eric Bell II	Democratic	2023	Jonesboro
76	Sandra Scott	Democratic	2011	Rex
77	Rhonda Burnough	Democratic	2017	Riverdale
78	Demetrius Douglas	Democratic	2013	Jonesboro
79	Yasmin Neal	Democratic	2011	Morrow
80	Long Tran	Democratic	2023	Dunwoody
81	Scott Holcomb	Democratic	2011	Atlanta
82	Mary Margaret Oliver	Democratic	2003	Atlanta
83	Karen Lupton	Democratic	2023	Chamblee
84	Omari Crawford	Democratic	2023	Decatur
85	Karla Drenner	Democratic	2001	Avondale Estates
86	Imani Barnes	Democratic	2023	Tucker
87	Viola Davis	Democratic	2019	Stone Mountain
88	Billy Mitchell	Democratic	2003	Lithonia
89	Becky Evans	Democratic	2023	Atlanta
90	Saira Draper	Democratic	2023	Atlanta
91	Angela Moore	Democratic	2021	Lithonia
92	Rhonda Taylor	Democratic	2021	Conyers
93	Doreen Carter	Democratic	2015	Lithonia
94	Karen Bennett	Democratic	2013	Stone Mountain
95	Dar'shun Kendrick	Democratic	2023	Lithonia
96	Pedro Marin	Democratic	2003	Duluth
97	Ruwa Romman	Democratic	2023	Duluth
98	Marvin Lim	Democratic	2021	Norcross
99	Matt Reeves	Republican	2023	Duluth
100	David Clark	Republican	2015	Sugar Hill
101	Gregg Kennard	Democratic	2017	Lawrenceville
102	Gabe Okoye	Democratic	2017	Lawrenceville
103	Soo Hong	Republican	2023	Lawrenceville
104	Chuck Efstration	Republican	2013	Auburn
105	Farooq Mughal	Democratic	2023	Dacula
106	Shelly Hutchinson	Democratic	2019	Snellville
107	Sam Park	Democratic	2023	Lawrenceville
108	Jasmine Clark	Democratic	2019	Lilburn
109	Dewey McClain	Democratic	2023	Lawrenceville
110	Segun Adeyina	Democratic	2023	Grayson
111	Reynaldo Martinez	Republican	2023	Loganville
112	Bruce Williamson	Republican	2023	Monroe
113	Sharon Henderson	Democratic	2021	Covington
114	Tim Fleming	Republican	2023	Covington
115	Regina Lewis-Ward	Democratic	2023	McDonough
116	El-Mahdi Holly	Democratic	2023	Stockbridge
117	Lauren Daniel	Republican	2023	Locust Grove
118	Clint Crowe	Republican	2023	Jackson
119	Holt Persinger	Republican	2023	Winder
120	Houston Gaines	Republican	2019	Athens
121	Marcus Wiedower	Republican	2019	Watkinsville
122	Spencer Frye	Democratic	2023	Athens
123	Rob Leverett	Republican	2023	Elberton
124	Trey Rhodes	Republican	2015	Greensboro
125	Barry Fleming	Republican	2013	Harlem
126	Gloria Frazier	Democratic	2007	Hephzibah
127	Mark Newton	Republican	2023	Augusta
128	Mack Jackson	Democratic	2009	Sandersville
129	Karlton Howard	Democratic	2023	Augusta
130	Lynn Gladney	Democratic	2023	Augusta
131	Jodi Lott	Republican	2023	Evans
132	Brian Prince	Democratic	2023	Augusta
133	Kenneth Vance	Republican	2023	Milledgeville
134	David Knight	Republican	2005	Griffin
135	Beth Camp	Republican	2021	Concord
136	David Jenkins	Republican	2021	Grantville
137	Debbie Buckner	Democratic	2003	Junction City
138	Vance Smith	Republican	2019	Hamilton
139	Vacant			
140	Tremaine Teddy Reese	Democratic	2023	Columbus
141	Carolyn Hugley	Democratic	1993	Columbus
142	Miriam Paris	Democratic	2017	Macon
143	James Beverly	Democratic	2011	Macon
144	Dale Washburn	Republican	2019	Macon
145	Robert Dickey	Republican	2011	Musella
146	Shaw Blackmon	Republican	2015	Kathleen
147	Bethany Ballard	Republican	2023	Warner Robins
148	Noel Williams Jr.	Republican	2019	Cordele
149	Danny Mathis	Republican	2011	Cochran
150	Patty Bentley	Democratic	2013	Butler
151	Mike Cheokas	Republican	2023	Americus
152	Bill Yearta	Republican	2019	Sylvester
153	David Sampson	Democratic	2023	Albany
154	Gerald Greene	Republican	2023	Cuthbert
155	Matt Hatchett	Republican	2023	Dublin
156	Leesa Hagan	Republican	2021	Lyons
157	Bill Werkheiser	Republican	2015	Glennville
158	Butch Parrish	Republican	1985	Swainsboro
159	Jon G. Burns	Republican	2005	Newington
160	Lehman Franklin	Republican	2023	Statesboro
161	Bill Hitchens	Republican	2013	Rincon
162	Carl Gilliard	Democratic	2016	Garden City
163	Anne Allen Westbrook	Democratic	2023	Savannah
164	Ron Stephens	Republican	1997	Richmond Hill
165	Edna Jackson	Democratic	2021	Savannah
166	Jesse Petrea	Republican	2015	Savannah
167	Buddy DeLoach	Republican	2021	Townsend
168	Al Williams	Democratic	2003	Midway
169	Clay Pirkle	Republican	2023	Ashburn
170	Penny Houston	Republican	1997	Nashville
171	Joe Campbell	Republican	2020	Camilla
172	Charles Cannon	Republican	2023	Moultrie
173	Darlene Taylor	Republican	2011	Thomasville
174	John Corbett	Republican	2015	Lake Park
175	John LaHood	Republican	2018	Valdosta
176	James Burchett	Republican	2019	Millwood
177	Dexter Sharper	Democratic	2013	Valdosta
178	Steven Meeks	Republican	2019	Screven
179	Rick Townsend	Republican	2023	St. Simons
180	Steven Sainz	Republican	2019	Woodbine

== See also ==
- List of Georgia state legislatures
