= 2022 Georgia gubernatorial election =

- November 8, 2022
- Turnout: 57.02% (▲0.22%)
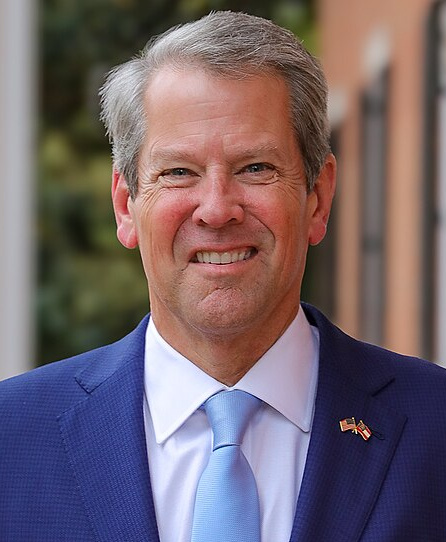

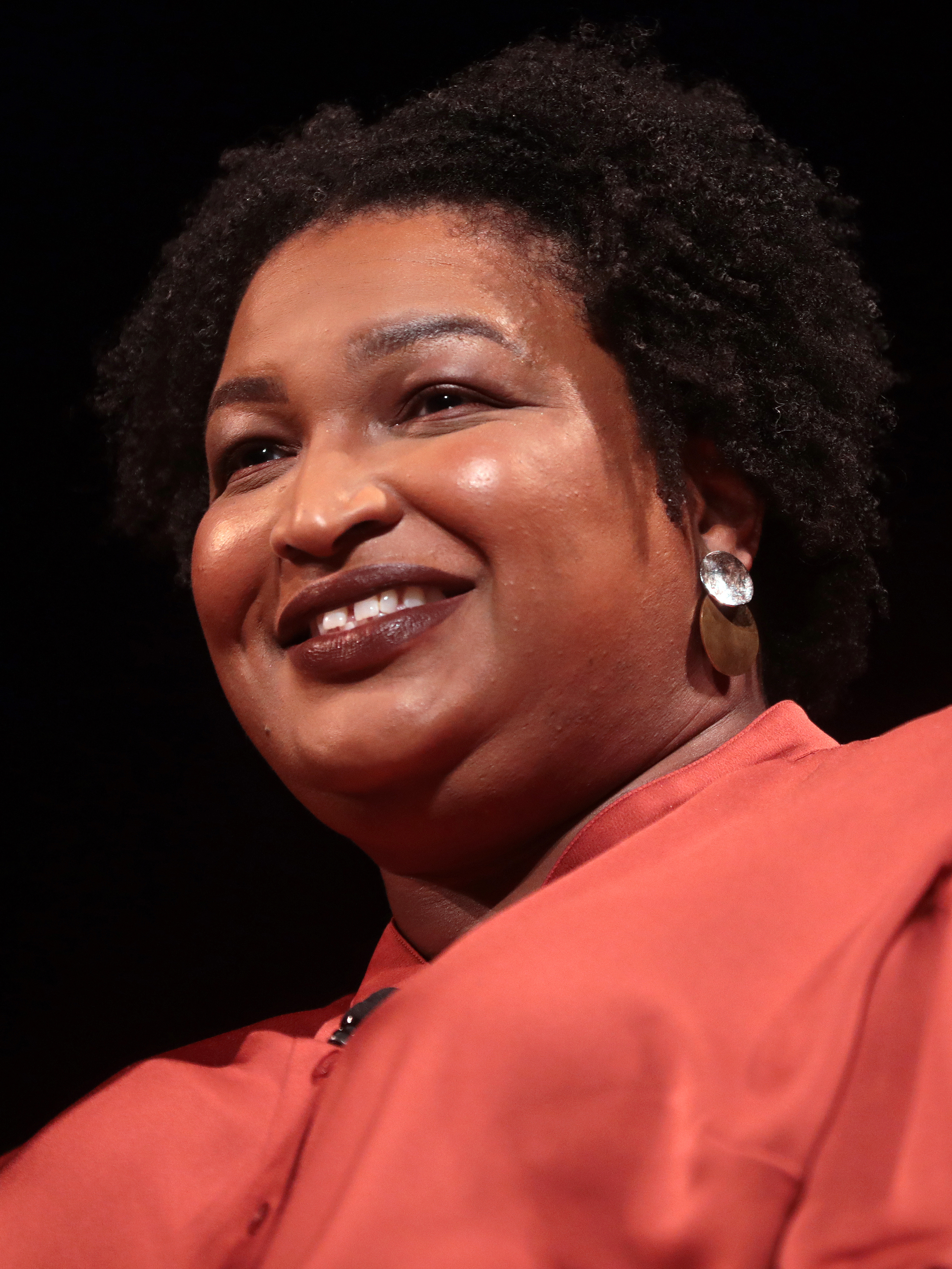
Nominee	Brian Kemp	Stacey Abrams
Party	Republican	Democratic
Popular vote	2,111,572	1,813,673
Percentage	53.41%	45.88%
- Kemp: 40–50% 50–60% 60–70% 70–80% 80–90% >90% Abrams: 40–50% 50–60% 60–70% 70–80% 80–90% >90% No data
Governor before election
Brian Kemp
Republican
Elected Governor
Brian Kemp
Republican

The 2022 Georgia gubernatorial election took place on November 8, 2022, to elect the governor of Georgia. Incumbent Republican Governor Brian Kemp won a second term, defeating Democratic nominee Stacey Abrams in a rematch. Abrams conceded on election night. The primary occurred on May 24, 2022. Kemp was sworn in for a second term on January 12, 2023.

Kemp was endorsed by former Vice President Mike Pence and former President George W. Bush. He faced a primary challenge from former U.S. Senator David Perdue, who was endorsed by then-former President Donald Trump after Kemp refused to overturn the results of the 2020 presidential election in Georgia. Trump ultimately gave Kemp an endorsement in the general election.

Stacey Abrams, the former minority leader of the Georgia House of Representatives and founder of Fair Fight Action who was narrowly defeated by Kemp in the 2018 gubernatorial election, was once again the Democratic nominee for the governorship. This was Georgia's first gubernatorial rematch since 1950.

== Republican primary ==
Incumbent governor Brian Kemp faced criticism from former president Donald Trump for his refusal to overturn the results of the 2020 United States presidential election. Kemp was booed at the Georgia Republican Convention in June 2021, and in December former senator David Perdue announced a primary challenge to Kemp and was promptly endorsed by Trump. Initial polling showed a competitive race, however, Kemp significantly outraised his opponent and signed conservative legislation such as permitless carry of firearms and a temporary suspension of the gas tax that shored up his position among voters, and on election day, he won by over 50 points, a margin far larger than predicted.

=== Candidates ===
==== Nominee ====
- Brian Kemp, incumbent governor (2019–present) and former secretary of state of Georgia (2010–2018)

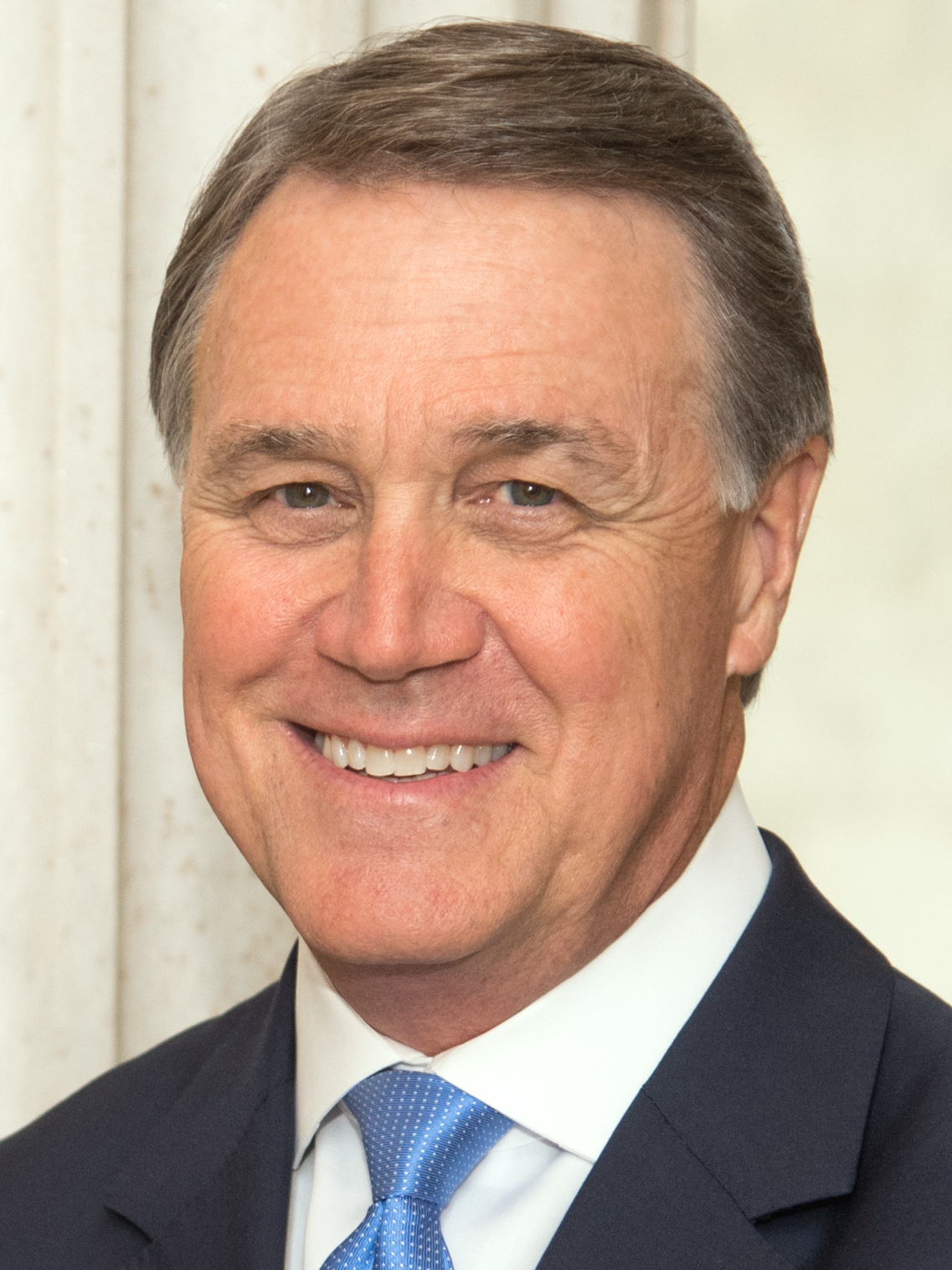
Former U.S. Senator David Perdue finished second in the primary.

==== Eliminated in primary ====
- Catherine Davis, HR professional
- David Perdue, former U.S. senator from Georgia (2015–2021)
- Kandiss Taylor, conservative commentator, host of the Jesus, Guns, and Babies show, and candidate for U.S. Senate in 2020
- Tom Williams, civil service retiree

==== Withdrawn ====
- Vernon Jones, former state representative (1993–2001, 2017–2021, Democratic until 2020) and CEO of DeKalb County (2001–2009) (endorsed Perdue) (ran for U.S. House in GA-10)

==== Declined ====
- Doug Collins, former U.S. representative for Georgia's 9th congressional district (2013–2021) and candidate for U.S. Senate in 2020
- Herschel Walker, former American football player (ran for U.S. Senate)

=== Debates ===
2022 Georgia gubernatorial Republican primary election debates
No.	Date	Organizer	Location	P Participant A Absent (invited) I Invited N Not invited					Source
No.	Date	Organizer	Location	Catherine Davis	Brian Kemp	David Perdue	Kandiss Taylor	Tom Williams	Source
1	April 24, 2022	WSB-TV	Atlanta	N	P	P	N	N	
2	April 28, 2022	WTOC-TV	Savannah	N	P	P	N	N	
3	May 2, 2022	Atlanta Press Club, Georgia Public Broadcasting	Atlanta	P	P	P	P	P	

=== Endorsements ===
Vernon Jones (withdrew)

Executive branch officials

- Michael Flynn, 25th United States National Security Advisor (2017) and former director of the Defense Intelligence Agency (2012–2014) (Democratic)

Local officials

- Rudy Giuliani, 107th mayor of New York City (1994–2001) and 3rd United States Associate Attorney General (1981–1983)
- Bernard Kerik, 40th commissioner of the New York Police Department (2000–2001) and Minister of Interior of Iraq (2003)

Individuals

- Travis Tritt, country music singer, songwriter, and actor
Brian Kemp

Executive branch officials

- George W. Bush, 43rd president of the United States (2001–2009)
- Mike Pence, 48th vice president of the United States (2017–2021)

U.S. governors

- Chris Christie, 55th governor of New Jersey (2010–2018) and candidate for president of the United States in 2016

State officials

- Chris Carr, attorney general of Georgia (2016–present)
- Geoff Duncan, lieutenant governor of Georgia (2019–2023)

Municipal officials

- Mike Bodker, mayor of Johns Creek (2019–present)
- Rusty Paul, mayor of Sandy Springs (2014–present)

Organizations

- Georgia Chamber of Commerce
David Perdue

Executive branch officials

- Donald Trump, 45th president of the United States (2017–2021)

Governors

- Sarah Palin, former governor of Alaska (2006–2009)

U.S. representatives

- Newt Gingrich, former speaker of the House (1995-1999) and former U.S. representative from Georgia's 6th congressional district (1979-1999)

State legislators

- Vernon Jones, former state representative (1993–2001, 2017–2021)
Kandiss Taylor

Organizations

- Georgia Right to Life, pro-life organization

Individuals

- Mike Lindell, founder and CEO of My Pillow
- Stew Peters, host of The Stew Peters Show, political commentator, and former bounty hunter
- Roger Stone, advisor to former President Donald Trump during the 2016 United States presidential election

=== Fundraising ===
Campaign finance reports as of April 30, 2022
Candidate	Raised	Spent	Cash on hand
Brian Kemp (R)	$22,427,829	$11,687,287	$10,740,541
David Perdue (R)	$3,475,864	$2,577,546	$898,318
Source: Georgia Campaign Finance Commission

=== Polling ===
View source data.

Aggregate polls

Source of poll aggregation	Dates administered	Dates updated	Brian Kemp	David Perdue	Kandiss Taylor	Other (Note: Calculated by taking the difference of 100% and all other candidates combined.)	Margin
Real Clear Politics	May 20–23, 2022	May 24, 2022	54.7%	35.3%	5.3%	4.7%	Kemp +19.4

Poll source	Date(s) administered	Sample size (Note: Key: A – all adults RV – registered voters LV – likely voters V – unclear)	Margin of error	Brian Kemp	Vernon Jones	David Perdue	Kandiss Taylor	Other	Undecided
The Trafalgar Group (R)	May 21–23, 2022	1,074 (LV)	± 2.9%	52%	–	38%	5%	1% (Note: Davis with 1%)	4%
Landmark Communications (R)	May 22, 2022	500 (LV)	± 4.4%	60%	–	30%	5%	1% (Note: Davis with 1%)	4%
InsiderAdvantage (R)	May 20–21, 2022	750 (LV)	± 3.6%	52%	–	38%	6%	1% (Note: Davis with 1%)	4%
Fox News	May 12–16, 2022	1,004 (LV)	± 3.0%	60%	–	28%	6%	2% (Note: Davis with 1%, "Other" (volunteered response) with 1%)	3%
ARW Strategies (R)	April 30 – May 1, 2022	600 (LV)	± 4.0%	59%	–	22%	7%	2% (Note: Davis with 1%, Williams with 0%)	11%
InsiderAdvantage (R)	April 28 – May 1, 2022	750 (LV)	± 3.6%	54%	–	38%	4%	2% (Note: Davis and Williams with 1%)	2%
SurveyUSA	April 22–27, 2022	559 (LV)	± 4.9%	56%	–	31%	3%	2% (Note: Davis and Williams with 1%)	8%
University of Georgia	April 10–22, 2022	886 (LV)	± 3.3%	53%	–	27%	4%	1% (Note: Davis with 1%, Williams with 0%)	15%
Guidant Polling & Strategy (R) (Note: This poll was sponsored by the Georgia Leadership Coalition.)	April 18–21, 2022	600 (LV)	± 4.0%	57%	–	31%	–	–	12%
Landmark Communications (R)	April 9–10, 2022	660 (LV)	± 3.8%	52%	–	28%	10%	1% (Note: Davis with 1%)	10%
Spry Strategies (R)	April 6–10, 2022	600 (LV)	± 4.0%	47%	–	35%	3%	1% (Note: Davis with 1%)	14%
University of Georgia	March 20 – April 8, 2022	~329 (LV)	± 5.4%	48%	–	37%	2%	1% (Note: Davis with 1%, Williams with 0%)	12%
Emerson College	April 1–3, 2022	509 (LV)	± 4.3%	43%	–	32%	2%	6% (Note: Davis with 5% and Williams with 1%)	17%
Cygnal (R) (Note: This poll was sponsored by Hardworking Georgians, which supports Kemp.)	March 30–31, 2022	825 (LV)	± 3.4%	49%	–	33%	5%	1% (Note: Davis with 1% and Williams with 0%)	12%
BK Strategies (R)	March 6–8, 2022	500 (LV)	± 4.4%	48%	–	33%	–	4%	14%
Fox News	March 2–6, 2022	914 (LV)	± 3.0%	50%	–	39%	–	4%	6%
American Viewpoint (R)	March 1–3, 2022	600 (LV)	± 4.0%	51%	–	35%	–	6%	8%
InsiderAdvantage (R)	February 28 – March 1, 2022	750 (LV)	± 3.6%	44%	–	35%	3%	3% (Note: "Other" with 2%, Davis with 1%)	15%
The Trafalgar Group (R)	February 11–13, 2022	1,072 (LV)	± 3.0%	49%	–	40%	3%	1% (Note: Garcia with 1%)	8%
	February 7, 2022	Jones withdraws from the race							
Quinnipiac University	January 19–24, 2022	666 (LV)	± 3.8%	43%	10%	36%	4%	1% (Note: Davis with 1%)	5%
InsiderAdvantage (R)	December 6, 2021	500 (LV)	± 4.4%	41%	11%	22%	4%	–	23%
American Viewpoint (R) (Note: This poll was sponsored by Kemp's campaign.)	December 1–6, 2021	1,050 (LV)	± 3.0%	54%	12%	22%	–	3%	7%
The Trafalgar Group (R)	September 2–4, 2021	1,076 (LV)	± 3.0%	48%	25%	–	7%	1% (Note: Garcia with 1%)	19%
Fabrizio Lee (R) (Note: This poll was sponsored by Save America PAC.)	August 11–12, 2021	500 (LV)	± 4.4%	41%	19%	16%	3%	<1% (Note: Garcia with <1%)	20%

Hypothetical polling

Runoff polling
Doug Collins vs. Brian Kemp

Poll source	Date(s) administered	Sample size	Margin of error	Doug Collins	Brian Kemp	Undecided
UNLV Business School	December 30, 2020 – January 3, 2021	209 (LV)	± 7.0%	29%	48%	23%
The Trafalgar Group (R)	December 25–27, 2020	– (LV)	–	53%	32%	16%

Marjorie Taylor Greene vs. Brian Kemp

Poll source	Date(s) administered	Sample size	Margin of error	Marjorie Taylor Greene	Brian Kemp	Undecided
UNLV Business School	December 30, 2020 – January 3, 2021	209 (LV)	± 7.0%	14%	60%	26%

Brian Kemp vs. David Perdue

Poll source	Date(s) administered	Sample size	Margin of error	Brian Kemp	David Perdue	Undecided
Emerson College	April 1–3, 2022	509 (LV)	± 4.3%	44%	39%	16%
Cygnal (R)	March 30–31, 2022	825 (LV)	± 3.4%	52%	37%	10%
Fabrizio Lee (R) (Note: This poll was sponsored by Perdue's campaign.)	December 7–9, 2021	800 (LV)	± 3.5%	44%	47%	9%
Fabrizio Lee (R)	August 11–12, 2021	500 (LV)	± 4.4%	46%	40%	14%

Brian Kemp vs. Herschel Walker

Poll source	Date(s) administered	Sample size	Margin of error	Brian Kemp	Herschel Walker	Undecided
UNLV Business School	December 30, 2020 – January 3, 2021	209 (LV)	± 7.0%	50%	25%	25%

=== Results ===
Results by county: Kemp: 40–50%; 50–60%; 60–70%; 70–80%; 80–90%

Results by precinct: Kemp: 40–50%; 50–60%; 60–70%; 70–80%; 80–90%; >90%; Perdue: 40–50%; 50–60%; 60–70%; 70–80%; >90%; Williams: >90%; Tie: 30–40%; 40–50%; 50%; No votes

Republican primary results
Party	Candidate	Votes	%
Republican	Brian Kemp (incumbent)	888,078	73.72%
Republican	David Perdue	262,389	21.78%
Republican	Kandiss Taylor	41,232	3.42%
Republican	Catherine Davis	9,778	0.81%
Republican	Tom Williams	3,255	0.27%
Total votes		1,204,742	100.0%

== Democratic primary ==
=== Candidates ===
==== Nominee ====
- Stacey Abrams, founder of Fair Fight Action, former minority leader of the Georgia House of Representatives (2011–2017) and nominee for governor in 2018

==== Declined ====
- Kasim Reed, former mayor of Atlanta (2010–2018) (ran for mayor)

=== Endorsements ===
Stacey Abrams

U.S. senators

- Jon Ossoff, U.S. senator from Georgia (2021–present)
- Raphael Warnock, U.S. senator from Georgia (2021–present)

State officials

- Bee Nguyen, state representative from the 89th district (2017–2023) and candidate for Georgia Secretary of State in 2022

Labor unions

- AFSCME
- CWA Local 3204
- Georgia AFL–CIO
- IBEW Local 1579 and 613
- IUPAT
- OPEIU
- SEIU-Workers United
- UFCW Local 1996

Organizations

- Democracy for America
- EMILY's List
- MarchOn
- MoveOn
- People for the American Way

=== Results ===
Democratic primary results
Party	Candidate	Votes	%
Democratic	Stacey Abrams	727,168	100.0%
Total votes		727,168	100.0%

== Independent and third-party candidates ==
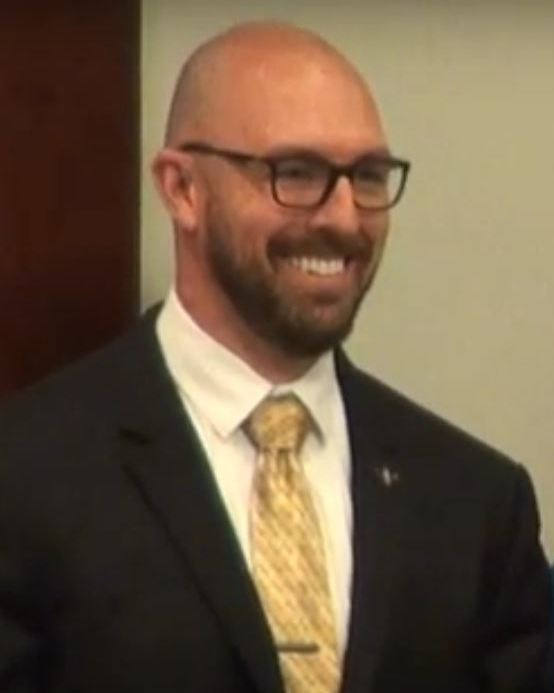
The Libertarian nominee, Shane Hazel

=== Declared ===
- Al Bartell (independent), businessman, U.S. Air Force veteran, and perennial candidate
- Shane T. Hazel (Libertarian), radio host, Republican candidate for Georgia's 7th congressional district in 2018, and Libertarian nominee for U.S. Senate in 2020

== General election ==
=== Predictions ===
Source	Ranking	As of
The Cook Political Report	Lean R	July 22, 2022
Inside Elections	Lean R	November 3, 2022
Sabato's Crystal Ball	Likely R	November 7, 2022
Politico	Lean R	October 3, 2022
RCP	Lean R	September 20, 2022
Fox News	Lean R	September 20, 2022
FiveThirtyEight	Likely R	October 27, 2022
Elections Daily	Likely R	November 7, 2022

=== Debates ===
2022 Georgia gubernatorial debates
No.	Date	Host	Moderator	Link	Republican	Democratic	Libertarian
Key: P Participant A Absent N Non-invitee I Invitee W Withdrawn							
Key: P Participant A Absent N Non-invitee I Invitee W Withdrawn					Brian Kemp	Stacey Abrams	Shane Hazel
1	Oct. 17, 2022	11 Alive			P	P	P
2	Oct. 30, 2022	WSB-TV			P	P	N

=== Endorsements ===
Brian Kemp (R)

US Presidents

- George W. Bush, 43rd president of the United States (2001–2009)
- Donald Trump, 45th president of the United States (2017–2021)

Other Executive branch officials

- Nikki Haley, United States Ambassador to the United Nations (2017–2018) and Governor of South Carolina (2011–2017)
- Mike Pence, 48th vice president of the United States (2017–2021)

U.S. senators

- Kelly Loeffler, U.S. senator from Georgia (2020–2021)
- David Perdue, U.S. senator from Georgia (2015–2021) and runner-up in the Republican primary

U.S. representatives

- Drew Ferguson, U.S. representative for GA-03 (2017–2025)
- Newt Gingrich, speaker of the United States House of Representatives (1995–1999) and U.S. representative for GA-06 (1979–1999)
- Kwanza Hall, U.S. representative for GA-05 (2020–2021) (Democrat)

U.S. governors

- Doug Ducey, governor of Arizona (2015–2023)
- Joe Frank Harris, 78th governor of Georgia (1983–1991) (Democrat)
- Larry Hogan, governor of Maryland (2015–2023)
- Pete Ricketts, governor of Nebraska (2015–2023)
- Glenn Youngkin, governor of Virginia (2022–2026)

State officials

- Tim Echols, Georgia Public Service Commissioner from the 2nd District (2011–2026)
- Shirley Miller, former First Lady of Georgia (1991–1999) (Democrat)

State officials

- John Albers, state senator from the 56th District (2011–present)
- Jason Anavitarte, state senator from the 31st District (2021–present)
- Lee Anderson, state senator from the 24th District (2017–present)
- Victor Anderson, state representative from the 10th District (2021–present)
- Mandi Ballinger, state representative from the 23rd District (2013–present)
- Matt Barton, state representative from the 5th District (2019–present)
- Dave Belton, state representative from the 112th District (2015–present)
- Shaw Blackmon, state representative from the 146th District (2015–present)
- Josh Bonner, state representative from the 72nd District (2017–present)
- Matt Brass, state senator from the 28th District (2017–present)
- James Burchett, state representative from the 176th District (2019–present)
- Dean Burke, state senator from the 11th District (2013–present)
- Jon G. Burns, majority leader of the Georgia House of Representatives (2015–present)
- Max Burns, state senator from the 23rd District (2021–present) and former U.S. representative for GA-12 (2003–2005)
- Mike Cameron, state representative from the 1st District (2021–present)
- Beth Camp, state representative from the 131st District (2021–present)
- Wes Cantrell, state representative from the 22nd District (2015–present)
- Kasey Carpenter, state representative from the 4th District (2017–present)
- John Carson, state representative from the 46th District (2011–present)
- Mike Cheokas, state representative from the 138th District (2019–present, 2005–2017)
- Heath Clark, state representative from the 147th District (2015–present)
- Sharon Cooper, state representative from the 43rd District (2013–present), the 41st District (2005–2013), the 30th District (2003–2005) and the 31st District (1997–2003)
- John Corbett, state representative from the 174th District (2015–present)
- Bill Cowsert, majority leader of the Georgia State Senate (2014–2019) from the 46th District (2007–present)
- Buddy DeLoach, state representative from the 167th District (2021–present) and the 127th District (1995–2005)
- Katie Dempsey, state representative from the 13th District (2007–present)
- Robert Dickey, state representative from the 140th District (2011–present)
- Clint Dixon, state senator from the 45th District (2021–present)
- Matt Dollar, state representative from the 45th District (2005–2022) and the 31st District (2003–2005)
- Matt Dubnik, state representative from the 29th District (2017–present)
- Mike Dugan, majority leader of the Georgia State Senate (2019–present) from the 30th District (2013–present)
- Emory Dunahoo, state representative from the 30th District (2011–present)
- Chuck Efstration, state representative from the 104th District (2013–present)
- Ginny Ehrhart, state representative from the 36th District (2019–present)
- Terry England, state representative from the 116th District (2013–present) and the 108th District (2005–2013)
- Chris Erwin, state representative from the 28th District (2019–present, 2019)
- Barry Fleming, state representative from the 121st District (2013–present), the 117th District (2005–2009) and the 79th District (2003–2005)
- Houston Gaines, state representative from the 117th District (2019–present)
- Matthew Gambill, state representative from the 15th District (2019–present)
- Frank Ginn, state senator from the 47th District (2011–present)
- Steve Gooch, state senator from the 51st District (2011–present)
- Russ Goodman, state senator from the 8th District (2021–present)
- Micah Gravley, state representative from the 67th District (2013–present)
- Gerald Greene, state representative from the 151st District (2013–present), the 149th District (2005–2013), the 134th District (2003–2005), the 158th District (1997–2003) and the 130th District (1983–1993)
- Joseph Gullett, state representative from the 19th District (2019–present)
- Stan Gunter, state representative from the 8th District (2021–present)
- Marty Harbin, state senator from the 16th District (2015–present)
- Tyler Harper, state senator from the 7th District (2013–present)
- Bo Hatchett, state senator from the 50th District (2021–present)
- Matt Hatchett, state representative from the 150th District (2013–present) and the 143rd District (2011–2012)
- Lee Hawkins, state representative from the 27th District (2013–present)
- Billy Hickman, state senator from the 4th District (2020–present)
- Dewayne Hill, state representative from the 3rd District (2017–present)
- Bill Hitchens, state representative from the 161st District (2013–present)
- Don Hogan, state representative from the 179th District (2017–present)
- Susan Holmes, state representative from the 129th District (2013–present) and the 125th District (2011–2012)
- Penny Houston, state representative from the 170th District (2005–present), the 139th District (2003–2005) and the 166th District (1997–2003)
- Chuck Hufstetler, state senator from the 52nd District (2013–present)
- David Jenkins, state representative from the 132nd District (2021–present)
- Jan Jones, Speaker pro tempore of the Georgia House of Representatives (2010–present)
- Trey Kelley, state representative from the 16th District (2013–present)
- John Kennedy, state senator from the 18th District (2015–present)
- Tom Kirby, state representative from the 114th District (2013–present) and the 107th District (2012–2013)
- Kay Kirkpatrick, state senator from the 32nd District (2017–present)
- David Knight, state representative from the 130th District (2013–present) and the 126th District (2005–2013)
- John LaHood, state representative from the 175th District (2018–present)
- Dominic LaRiccia, state representative from the 169th District (2015–present)
- Rob Leverett, state representative from the 33rd District (2021–present)
- Jodi Lott, state representative from the 122nd District (2015–present)
- Eddie Lumsden, state representative from the 12th District (2013–present)
- Chuck Martin, state representative from the 49th District (2013–present), the 47th District (2005–2013) and the 37th District (2003–2005)
- Karen Mathiak, state representative from the 73rd District (2017–present)
- Danny Mathis, state representative from the 144th District (2019–present)
- Lauren McDonald, state representative from the 26th District (2021–present)
- Sheila McNeill, state senator from the 3rd District (2021–present)
- Steven Meeks, state representative from the 178th District (2019–present)
- Butch Miller, President pro tempore of the Georgia State Senate (2018–present) from the 49th District (2010–present)
- Martin Momtahan, state representative from the 17th District (2019–present)
- Jeff Mullis, state senator from the 53rd District (2001–present)
- Mark Newton, state representative from the 123rd District (2013–present)
- Randy Nix, state representative from the 69th District (2007–present)
- Butch Parrish, state representative from the 158th District (2013–present), the 156th District (2005–2013), the 102nd District (2003–2005), the 144th District (1993–2003) and the 109th District (1985–1993)
- Don Parsons, state representative from the 44th District (2013–present), the 42nd District (2005–2013), the 29th District (2003–2005) and the 40th District (1995–2003)
- Chuck Payne, state senator from the 54th District (2017–present)
- Jesse Petrea, state representative from the 166th District (2015–present)
- Clay Pirkle, state representative from the 155th District (2015–present)
- Robert Pruitt, state representative from the 149th District (2021–present)
- David Ralston, Speaker of the Georgia House of Representatives (2010–present) from the 7th District (2005–present) and the 6th District (2003–2005)
- Trey Rhodes, state representative from the 120th District (2015–present)
- Bonnie Rich, state representative from the 97th District (2019–present)
- Jason Ridley, state representative from the 6th District (2017–present)
- Randy Robertson, state senator from the 29th District (2019–present)
- Steven Sainz, state representative from the 180th District (2019–present)
- Mitchell Scoggins, state representative from the 14th District (2019–present)
- Devan Seabaugh, state representative from the 34th District (2021–present)
- Ed Setzler, state representative from the 35th District (2005–present)
- Lynn Smith, state representative from the 70th District (2005–present), the 87th District (2003–2005) and the 103rd District (1997–2003)
- Richard Smith, state representative from the 134th District (2005–present)
- Tyler Smith, state representative from the 18th District (2021–present)
- Ron Stephens, state representative from the 164th District (2005–present), the 123rd District (2003–2005) and the 150th District (1997–2003)
- Brian Strickland, state senator from the 17th District (2019–present)
- Carden Summers, state senator from the 13th District (2020–present)
- Jan Tankersley, state representative from the 160th District (2011–present)
- Steve Tarvin, state representative from the 2nd District (2014–present)
- Darlene Taylor, state representative from the 173rd District (2011–present)
- Brad Thomas, state representative from the 21st District (2021–present)
- Blake Tillery, state senator from the 19th District (2017–present)
- Lindsey Tippins, state senator from the 37th District (2010–present)
- Will Wade, state representative from the 9th District (2021–present)
- Larry Walker III, state senator from the 20th District (2015–present)
- Dale Washburn, state representative from the 141st District (2019–present)
- Ben Watson, state senator from the 1st District (2015–present)
- Sam Watson, state representative from the 172nd District (2013–present)
- Bill Werkheiser, state representative from the 157th District (2015–present)
- Marcus Wiedower, state representative from the 119th District (2019–present)
- Noel Williams Jr., state representative from the 148th District (2019–present)
- Bruce Williamson, state representative from the 115th District (2013–present) and the 111th District (2011–2013)
- Bill Yearta, state representative from the 152nd District (2019–present)

Municipal officials

- Michael Caldwell, mayor of Woodstock (2022–present) and former state representative from the 20th District (2013–2021)

Individuals

- Vince Dooley, former head football coach for the University of Georgia (deceased)
- C. J. Pearson, conservative activist

Organizations

- Huck PAC
- NRA Political Victory Fund
- Republican Governors Association
Stacey Abrams (D)

US Presidents

- Barack Obama, 44th president of the United States (2009–2017)

U.S. representatives

- Nikema Williams, U.S. representative for GA-05 (2021–present)

U.S. governors

- Phil Murphy, governor of New Jersey (2018–2026) and former U.S. Ambassador to Germany (2009–2013)

State officials

- Edna Jackson, state representative from the 165th district (2021–present)

Labor unions

- National Education Association

Individuals

- Byron Allen, businessman and philanthropist
- Jill Biden, First Lady of the United States
- Selena Gomez, actress and singer
- LeBron James, professional basketball player
- Latto, rapper
- John Legend, singer
- Lil Baby, rapper
- Natalie Portman, actress
- Kerry Washington, actress
- Oprah Winfrey, talk show host and actress

=== Fundraising ===
Campaign finance reports as of December 31, 2022
Candidate	Raised	Spent	Cash on hand
Brian Kemp (R)	$44,593,500	$40,666,892	$3,926,608
Stacey Abrams (D)	$54,021,428	$53,951,027	$70,400
Source: Georgia Campaign Finance Commission

=== Polling ===
Aggregate polls

Source of poll aggregation	Dates administered	Dates updated	Brian Kemp (R)	Stacey Abrams (D)	Other (Note: Calculated by taking the difference of 100% and all other candidates combined.)	Margin
Real Clear Politics	November 1–7, 2022	November 8, 2022	52.8%	44.5%	2.7%	Kemp +8.3
FiveThirtyEight	February 6 – November 8, 2022	November 8, 2022	52.2%	44.4%	3.4%	Kemp +7.8
270ToWin	November 7, 2022	November 8, 2022	52.2%	45.0%	4.5%	Kemp +6.3
Average			52.4%	44.6%	3.0%	Kemp +7.8

View source data.

Poll source	Date(s) administered	Sample size	Margin of error	Brian Kemp (R)	Stacey Abrams (D)	Other	Undecided
Landmark Communications	November 4–7, 2022	1,214 (LV)	± 2.8%	52%	46%	2% (Note: Hazel (L) with 2%)	1%
InsiderAdvantage (R)	November 6, 2022	550 (LV)	± 4.2%	50%	45%	1% (Note: Hazel (L) with 1%)	4%
Research Co.	November 4–6, 2022	450 (LV)	± 4.6%	51%	44%	1% (Note: "Some other candidate" with 1%)	4%
The Trafalgar Group (R)	November 4–6, 2022	1,103 (LV)	± 2.9%	53%	44%	2% (Note: Hazel (L) with 2%)	1%
Data for Progress (D)	November 2–6, 2022	1,474 (LV)	± 3.0%	54%	45%	2% (Note: Hazel (L) with 2%)	–
Targoz Market Research	November 2–6, 2022	579 (LV)	± 4.0%	56%	42%	3% (Note: Hazel (L) with 1%; "All others" with 2%)	–
East Carolina University	November 2–5, 2022	1,077 (LV)	± 3.5%	53%	46%	1% (Note: Hazel (L) with 1%)	1%
Amber Integrated (R)	November 1–2, 2022	600 (LV)	± 4.0%	52%	43%	1% (Note: Hazel (L) with 1%)	3%
Remington Research Group (R)	November 1–2, 2022	1,150 (LV)	± 2.8%	55%	41%	1% (Note: Hazel (L) with 1%)	3%
Echleon Insights	October 31 – November 2, 2022	550 (LV)	± 5.4%	50%	43%	3% (Note: Hazel (L) with 3%)	4%
Marist College	October 31 – November 2, 2022	1,168 (RV)	± 3.9%	51%	45%	<1% (Note: "Another party's candidate" with <1%)	4%
Marist College	October 31 – November 2, 2022	1,009 (LV)	± 4.2%	53%	45%	–	2%
SurveyUSA	October 29 – November 2, 2022	1,171 (LV)	± 3.7%	52%	45%	1% (Note: Hazel (L) with 1%)	2%
Patinkin Research Strategies (D) (Note: This poll was sponsored by Progress Georgia, an organization affiliated with the Georgia Democratic Party.)	October 30 – November 1, 2022	700 (RV)	± 3.7%	49%	47%	2% (Note: Hazel (L) with 2%)	2%
Emerson College	October 28–31, 2022	1,000 (LV)	± 3.0%	52%	46%	2% (Note: Hazel (L) with 1%; "Someone else" with 1%)	1%
Emerson College	October 28–31, 2022	1,000 (LV)	± 3.0%	52%	46%	2% (Note: Hazel (L) with 1%; "Someone else" with 1%)	–
Seven Letter Insight	October 24–31, 2022	762 (LV)	± 3.6%	49%	44%	4% (Note: Hazel (L) with 4%)	4%
Fox News	October 26–30, 2022	1,002 (RV)	± 3.0%	49%	43%	3% (Note: "Other" with 2%; "Wouldn't vote" with 1%)	5%
InsiderAdvantage (R)	October 27, 2022	550 (LV)	± 4.2%	52%	43%	1% (Note: Hazel (L) with 1%)	5%
Siena College/NYT	October 24–27, 2022	604 (LV)	± 4.8%	50%	45%	1% (Note: Hazel (L) with 1%)	4%
University of Georgia	October 16–27, 2022	1,022 (LV)	± 3.1%	51%	44%	2% (Note: Hazel (L) with 2%)	3%
Rasmussen Reports (R)	October 23–24, 2022	1,053 (LV)	± 3.0%	51%	41%	–	–
The Trafalgar Group (R) (Note: This poll was sponsored by The Daily Wire.)	October 21–23, 2022	1,076 (LV)	± 2.9%	52%	45%	3% (Note: Hazel (L) with 3%)	–
East Carolina University	October 13–18, 2022	905 (LV)	± 3.8%	51%	44%	2% (Note: "Some other candidate" with 2%)	3%
Landmark Communications	October 15–17, 2022	500 (LV)	± 4.4%	51%	45%	2% (Note: Hazel (L) with 2%)	2%
Data for Progress (D)	October 13–17, 2022	984 (LV)	± 3.0%	53%	43%	1% (Note: Hazel (L) with 1%)	4%
InsiderAdvantage (R)	October 16, 2022	550 (LV)	± 4.2%	50%	43%	2% (Note: Hazel (L) with 1%; "Other" with 0%)	5%
Wick Insights	October 8–14, 2022	1,018 (LV)	± 3.1%	52%	43%	2% (Note: "Someone else" with 2%)	3%
Civiqs	October 8–11, 2022	717 (LV)	± 4.6%	51%	46%	1% (Note: "Someone else" with 1%)	1%
The Trafalgar Group (R)	October 8–11, 2022	1,084 (LV)	± 2.9%	53%	44%	2% (Note: Hazel (L) with 2%)	2%
Quinnipiac University	October 7–10, 2022	1,157 (LV)	± 2.9%	50%	49%	1% (Note: "Refused" with 1%)	1%
Emerson College	October 6–7, 2022	1,000 (LV)	± 3.0%	51%	46%	1% (Note: Hazel (L) with 1%; "Someone else" with <1%)	2%
InsiderAdvantage (R)	October 4, 2022	550 (LV)	± 4.2%	50%	45%	2% (Note: Hazel (L) with 2%; "Other" with <1%)	3%
SurveyUSA	September 30 – October 4, 2022	1,076 (LV)	± 3.7%	47%	45%	3% (Note: "Other candidate" with 3%)	5%
University of Georgia	September 25 – October 4, 2022	1,030 (LV)	± 3.1%	51%	41%	2% (Note: Hazel (L) with 2%)	6%
Fox News	September 22–26, 2022	1,011 (RV)	± 3.0%	50%	43%	4% (Note: "Other" with 2%; "Wouldn't vote" with 2%)	4%
Data for Progress (D)	September 16–20, 2022	1,006 (RV)	± 3.0%	51%	44%	3% (Note: Hazel (L) with 3%)	2%
YouGov/CBS News	September 14–19, 2022	1,178 (RV)	± 4.0%	52%	46%	2% (Note: "Someone else" with 2%)	0%
Patinkin Research Strategies (D)	September 14–18, 2022	600 (RV)	± 4.0%	50%	47%	2%	2%
University of Georgia	September 5–16, 2022	861 (LV)	± 3.3%	50%	42%	2%	6%
Marist College	September 12–15, 2022	1,202 (RV)	± 3.6%	50%	44%	2% (Note: Hazel (L) with 2%)	4%
Marist College	September 12–15, 2022	992 (LV)	± 4.0%	53%	42%	2% (Note: Hazel (L) with 2%)	2%
Survey Monkey (D) (Note: This poll was sponsored by Center Street PAC, which opposes Kemp.)	September 9–12, 2022	949 (RV)	± 3.0%	45%	46%	–	9%
Survey Monkey (D)	September 9–12, 2022	542 (LV)	± 3.0%	49%	47%	–	5%
Quinnipiac University	September 8–12, 2022	1,278 (LV)	± 2.7%	50%	48%	1%	1%
InsiderAdvantage (R)	September 6–7, 2022	550 (LV)	± 4.2%	50%	42%	2% (Note: Hazel with 3%)	6%
Echelon Insights	August 31 – September 7, 2022	751 (LV)	± 4.4%	47%	48%	–	5%
Emerson College	August 28–29, 2022	600 (LV)	± 3.9%	48%	44%	6%	2%
TargetSmart (D) (Note: This poll was sponsored by Abrams's campaign.)	August 22–29, 2022	2,327 (LV)	± 3.1%	48%	46%	2% (Note: Hazel and "Other" with 1%)	3%
The Trafalgar Group (R)	August 24–27, 2022	1,079 (LV)	± 2.9%	51%	44%	2% (Note: Hazel with 2%; "Other" with 0%)	4%
Phillips Academy	August 3–7, 2022	971 (RV)	± 3.1%	51%	44%	–	5%
Research Affiliates (D) (Note: This poll was sponsored by Charlie Bailey's campaign for lieutenant governor.)	July 26 – August 1, 2022	420 (LV)	± 4.8%	47%	47%	–	6%
InsiderAdvantage (R)	July 26–27, 2022	750 (LV)	± 3.6%	49%	44%	5% (Note: Hazel with 3%, "Other" with 2%)	2%
Fox News	July 22–26, 2022	901 (RV)	± 3.0%	47%	44%	1%	7%
SurveyUSA	July 21–24, 2022	604 (LV)	± 5.3%	45%	44%	4%	7%
University of Georgia	July 14–22, 2022	902 (LV)	± 3.3%	48%	43%	2% (Note: Bartell and Hazel with 1%)	7%
Beacon Research (D) (Note: This poll was sponsored by the Environmental Voter Project.)	July 5–20, 2022	1,003 (RV)	± 3.1%	45%	44%	1%	7%
Beacon Research (D)	July 5–20, 2022	602 (LV)	± 4.0%	51%	43%	1%	5%
Fabrizio Ward (R)/Impact Research (D)	July 5–11, 2022	1,197 (LV)	± 4.4%	52%	45%	–	3%
Cygnal (R)	July 5–7, 2022	1,200 (LV)	± 2.7%	50%	45%	–	5%
Data for Progress (D)	July 1–6, 2022	1,131 (LV)	± 3.0%	53%	44%	–	3%
Change Research (D) (Note: This poll was sponsored by Future Majority and America’s Future Majority Fund.)	June 24–27, 2022	704 (LV)	± 3.7%	49%	47%	–	4%
Quinnipiac University	June 23–27, 2022	1,497 (RV)	± 2.5%	48%	48%	1%	3%
Moore Information Group (R) (Note: Poll sponsored by Walker's campaign for U.S. Senate)	June 11–16, 2022	800 (LV)	± 3.0%	51%	44%	–	5%
East Carolina University	June 6–9, 2022	868 (RV)	± 3.9%	51%	45%	2%	2%
TargetSmart (D)	Late May 2022	– (LV)	–	51%	43%	2%	4%
SurveyUSA	April 22–27, 2022	1,278 (LV)	± 3.4%	50%	45%	–	5%
Cygnal (R)	April 6–9, 2022	800 (LV)	± 3.4%	50%	44%	–	6%
Emerson College	April 1–3, 2022	1,013 (RV)	± 3.0%	51%	44%	–	5%
Wick	February 2–6, 2022	1,290 (LV)	± 2.7%	49%	44%	–	7%
Quinnipiac University	January 19–24, 2022	1,702 (RV)	± 2.4%	49%	47%	–	3%
University of Georgia	January 13–24, 2022	872 (RV)	± 3.3%	48%	41%	1%	8%
Redfield & Wilton Strategies	November 9, 2021	753 (RV)	± 3.6%	44%	41%	3%	6%
Redfield & Wilton Strategies	November 9, 2021	733 (LV)	± 3.6%	47%	44%	3%	4%
UNLV Business School	December 30, 2020 – January 3, 2021	550 (LV)	± 4.0%	44%	40%	–	16%

Hypothetical polling

Vernon Jones vs. Stacey Abrams

Poll source	Date(s) administered	Sample size	Margin of error	Vernon Jones (R)	Stacey Abrams (D)	Other	Undecided
Redfield & Wilton Strategies	November 9, 2021	753 (RV)	± 3.6%	37%	42%	2%	12%
Redfield & Wilton Strategies	November 9, 2021	733 (LV)	± 3.6%	40%	45%	2%	9%

Doug Collins vs. Stacey Abrams

Poll source	Date(s) administered	Sample size	Margin of error	Doug Collins (R)	Stacey Abrams (D)	Undecided
UNLV Business School	December 30, 2020 – January 3, 2021	550 (LV)	± 4.0%	44%	42%	14%

David Perdue vs. Stacey Abrams

Poll source	Date(s) administered	Sample size	Margin of error	David Perdue (R)	Stacey Abrams (D)	Other	Undecided
SurveyUSA	April 22–27, 2022	1,278 (LV)	± 3.4%	49%	46%	–	5%
Cygnal (R)	April 6–9, 2022	800 (LV)	± 3.4%	47%	48%	–	5%
Emerson College	April 1–3, 2022	1,013 (RV)	± 3.0%	49%	44%	–	7%
Wick	February 2–6, 2022	1,290 (LV)	± 2.7%	47%	45%	–	8%
Quinnipiac University	January 19–24, 2022	1,702 (RV)	± 2.4%	48%	48%	1%	3%
University of Georgia	January 13–24, 2022	872 (RV)	± 3.3%	47%	43%	2%	6%

Marjorie Taylor Greene vs. Stacey Abrams

Poll source	Date(s) administered	Sample size	Margin of error	Marjorie Taylor Greene (R)	Stacey Abrams (D)	Undecided
UNLV Business School	December 30, 2020 – January 3, 2021	550 (LV)	± 4.0%	41%	42%	16%

Herschel Walker vs. Stacey Abrams

Poll source	Date(s) administered	Sample size	Margin of error	Herschel Walker (R)	Stacey Abrams (D)	Undecided
UNLV Business School	December 30, 2020 – January 3, 2021	550 (LV)	± 4.0%	43%	41%	16%

=== Results ===
2022 Georgia gubernatorial election
Party	Candidate	Votes	%	±%
Republican	Brian Kemp (incumbent)	2,111,572	53.41%	+3.19%
Democratic	Stacey Abrams	1,813,673	45.88%	−2.95%
Libertarian	Shane T. Hazel	28,163	0.71%	−0.24%
Total votes		3,953,408	100.00%	
Turnout		3,964,926	57.02%	
Registered electors		6,953,485		
Republican hold				

==== By county ====
By county

County	Brian Kemp Republican		Stacey Abrams Democratic		Shane Hazel Libertarian		Margin		Total votes
County	#	%	#	%	#	%	#	%	Total votes
Appling	5,552	82.83	1,131	16.87	20	0.30	4,421	65.96	6,703
Atkinson	1,767	78.67	467	20.79	12	0.53	1,300	57.88	2,246
Bacon	3,312	89.01	393	10.56	16	0.43	2,919	78.45	3,721
Baker	755	60.02	500	39.75	3	0.24	255	20.27	1,258
Baldwin	7,987	53.24	6,913	46.08	102	0.68	1,074	7.16	15,002
Banks	6,651	90.79	607	8.29	68	0.93	6,044	82.50	7,326
Barrow	21,833	74.19	7,309	24.84	288	0.98	14,524	49.35	29,430
Bartow	31,528	78.83	8,137	20.34	332	0.83	23,391	58.49	39,997
Ben Hill	3,412	66.67	1,680	32.83	26	0.51	1,732	33.84	5,118
Berrien	5,209	86.54	772	12.83	38	0.63	4,437	73.71	6,019
Bibb	22,396	41.32	31,514	58.14	290	0.54	-9,118	-16.82	54,200
Bleckley	3,886	80.87	883	18.38	36	0.75	3,003	62.49	4,805
Brantley	5,416	92.44	393	6.71	50	0.85	3,023	85.73	5,859
Brooks	3,644	64.59	1,959	34.72	39	0.69	1,683	29.87	5,642
Bryan	12,188	71.67	4,676	27.50	142	0.83	7,512	69.17	17,006
Bulloch	16,067	68.11	7,352	31.16	172	0.73	8,715	36.95	23,591
Burke	4,685	55.33	3,720	43.94	62	0.73	965	11.39	8,467
Butts	7,223	74.50	2,420	24.96	52	0.54	4,803	49.54	9,695
Calhoun	793	46.24	919	53.59	3	0.17	-126	-7.35	1,715
Camden	12,494	69.62	5,264	29.33	187	1.04	7,230	40.29	17,945
Candler	2,666	74.85	885	24.85	11	0.31	1,781	50.00	3,562
Carroll	32,095	73.40	11,258	25.75	374	0.86	20,837	47.65	43,727
Catoosa	20,009	81.66	4,255	17.37	239	0.98	15,754	64.29	24,503
Charlton	2,654	77.94	728	21.38	23	0.68	1,926	56.56	3,405
Chatham	46,593	43.82	58,978	55.47	758	0.71	-12,385	-11.65	106,329
Chattahoochee	583	57.16	427	41.86	10	0.98	156	15.30	1,020
Chattooga	6,471	83.91	1,192	15.46	49	0.64	5,279	68.45	7,712
Cherokee	89,322	74.20	29,893	24.83	1,159	0.96	59,429	49.37	120,374
Clarke	13,091	32.47	26,901	66.73	324	0.80	-13,810	-34.26	40,316
Clay	570	50.62	553	49.11	3	0.27	17	1.51	1,126
Clayton	11,306	13.44	72,399	86.05	431	0.51	-61,093	-72.61	84,136
Clinch	1,668	78.90	433	20.48	13	0.61	1,235	58.42	2,114
Cobb	147,698	47.31	161,872	51.85	2,645	0.85	-14,174	-4.54	312,215
Coffee	8,818	74.07	3,021	25.38	66	0.55	5,797	48.69	11,905
Colquitt	9,860	78.27	2,684	21.30	54	0.43	7,176	56.97	12,598
Columbia	43,437	67.27	20,617	31.93	518	0.80	22,820	35.34	64,572
Cook	4,138	74.46	1,387	24.96	32	0.58	2,751	49.50	5,557
Coweta	45,376	71.20	17,847	28.01	503	0.79	27,529	43.19	63,726
Crawford	3,633	75.14	1,171	24.22	31	0.64	2,462	50.92	4,835
Crisp	4,296	67.95	2,013	31.84	13	0.21	2,283	36.11	6,322
Dade	4,969	85.03	807	13.81	68	1.16	4,162	71.22	5,844
Dawson	12,010	85.92	1,827	13.07	141	1.01	10,183	72.85	13,978
Decatur	5,659	63.71	3,191	35.92	33	0.37	2,468	27.79	8,883
DeKalb	54,522	18.28	241,901	81.11	1,806	0.61	-187,379	-62.83	298,229
Dodge	5,087	76.73	1,518	22.90	25	0.38	3,569	53.83	6,630
Dooly	1,860	56.60	1,416	43.09	10	0.30	444	13.51	3,286
Dougherty	8,524	31.91	18,091	67.73	94	0.35	-9,567	-35.82	26,709
Douglas	19,719	37.25	32,858	62.08	353	0.67	-13,139	-24.83	52,930
Early	2,321	59.39	1,576	40.33	11	0.28	745	19.06	3,908
Echols	956	89.77	94	8.83	15	1.41	862	80.94	1,065
Effingham	19,553	76.99	5,603	22.06	242	0.95	13,950	54.93	25,398
Elbert	5,369	73.31	1,916	26.16	39	0.53	3,453	47.15	7,324
Emanuel	5,505	72.80	2,024	26.77	33	0.44	3,481	46.03	7,562
Evans	2,467	73.40	882	26.24	12	0.36	1,585	47.16	3,361
Fannin	10,752	85.08	1,796	14.21	89	0.70	8,956	70.87	12,637
Fayette	34,116	56.53	25,769	42.70	461	0.76	8,347	13.83	60,346
Floyd	23,930	74.60	7,855	24.49	293	0.91	16,075	50.11	32,078
Forsyth	74,116	72.35	27,434	26.78	896	0.87	46,682	45.57	102,446
Franklin	7,734	88.50	948	10.85	57	0.65	6,786	77.65	8,739
Fulton	128,167	30.52	289,085	68.85	2,632	0.63	-160,918	-38.33	419,884
Gilmer	11,952	84.85	2,010	14.27	124	0.88	9,942	70.58	14,086
Glascock	1,211	92.80	89	6.82	5	0.38	1,122	85.98	1,305
Glynn	22,245	66.84	10,779	32.39	255	0.77	11,466	34.45	33,279
Gordon	16,003	84.64	2,743	14.51	161	0.85	13,260	70.13	18,907
Grady	5,884	70.54	2,422	29.04	35	0.42	3,462	41.50	8,341
Greene	7,402	70.44	3,060	29.12	46	0.44	4,342	41.32	10,508
Gwinnett	133,076	44.44	164,051	54.78	2,355	0.79	-30,975	-10.34	299,482
Habersham	14,513	85.42	2,322	13.67	155	0.91	12,191	71.75	16,990
Hall	56,573	76.95	16,299	22.17	644	0.88	40,274	54.78	73,516
Hancock	1,073	31.54	2,313	67.99	16	0.47	-1,240	-36.45	3,402
Haralson	10,398	89.25	1,166	10.01	87	0.75	9,232	79.24	11,651
Harris	12,924	75.85	4,008	23.52	107	0.63	8,916	52.33	17,039
Hart	8,426	79.79	2,039	19.31	95	0.90	6,387	60.48	10,560
Heard	3,858	86.44	568	12.73	37	0.83	3,290	73.71	4,463
Henry	36,392	38.08	58,643	61.36	533	0.56	-22,251	-23.28	95,568
Houston	34,842	58.84	23,928	40.41	440	0.74	10,914	18.43	59,210
Irwin	2,695	78.85	702	20.54	21	0.61	1,993	58.31	3,418
Jackson	26,223	82.25	5,420	17.00	238	0.75	20,803	65.25	31,881
Jasper	5,237	79.66	1,286	19.56	51	0.78	3,951	60.10	6,574
Jeff Davis	3,865	85.08	646	14.22	32	0.70	3,219	70.86	4,543
Jefferson	3,162	50.37	3,089	49.20	27	0.43	73	1.17	6,278
Jenkins	1,893	68.24	871	31.40	10	0.36	1,022	36.84	2,774
Johnson	2,504	74.02	867	25.63	12	0.35	1,637	48.39	3,383
Jones	8,583	69.71	3,657	29.70	72	0.58	4,926	40.01	12,312
Lamar	5,736	73.97	1,963	25.31	56	0.72	3,773	48.66	7,755
Lanier	1,932	73.24	691	26.19	15	0.57	1,241	47.05	2,638
Laurens	12,508	67.43	5,973	32.20	69	0.37	6,535	35.23	18,550
Lee	10,094	74.29	3,413	25.12	80	0.59	6,681	49.17	13,587
Liberty	6,069	39.37	9,235	59.91	111	0.72	-3,166	-20.54	15,415
Lincoln	2,966	74.49	992	24.91	24	0.60	1,974	49.58	3,982
Long	2,944	66.52	1,443	32.60	39	0.88	1,501	33.92	4,426
Lowndes	21,256	61.15	13,275	38.19	229	0.66	7,981	22.96	34,760
Lumpkin	10,525	82.63	2,070	16.25	142	1.11	8,455	66.38	12,737
Macon	1,551	41.05	2,209	58.47	18	0.48	-658	-17.42	3,778
Madison	9,955	79.30	2,500	19.91	99	0.79	7,455	59.39	12,554
Marion	1,868	65.64	954	33.52	24	0.84	914	32.12	2,846
McDuffie	5,283	63.52	2,978	35.81	56	0.67	2,305	27.71	8,317
McIntosh	3,570	64.71	1,923	34.86	24	0.44	1,647	29.85	5,517
Meriwether	5,704	64.03	3,160	35.47	44	0.49	2,544	28.56	8,908
Miller	1,689	78.05	462	21.35	13	0.60	1,227	56.70	2,164
Mitchell	4,197	59.52	2,829	40.12	26	0.37	1,368	19.40	7,052
Monroe	10,314	75.19	3,315	24.17	89	0.65	6,999	51.02	13,718
Montgomery	2,545	78.89	670	20.77	11	0.34	1,875	58.12	3,226
Morgan	7,764	75.19	2,473	23.95	89	0.86	5,291	51.24	10,326
Murray	10,290	89.22	1,160	10.06	83	0.72	9,130	79.16	11,533
Muscogee	23,925	40.24	35,149	59.11	388	0.65	-11,224	-18.87	59,462
Newton	19,094	44.53	23,531	54.88	251	0.59	-4,437	-10.35	42,876
Oconee	16,553	73.64	5,783	25.73	142	0.63	10,770	47.91	22,478
Oglethorpe	4,998	73.38	1,766	25.93	47	0.69	3,232	47.45	6,811
Paulding	43,992	65.66	22,427	33.47	585	0.87	21,565	32.19	67,004
Peach	5,542	55.20	4,431	44.14	66	0.66	1,111	11.06	10,039
Pickens	12,937	85.76	2,041	13.53	108	0.72	10,896	72.23	15,086
Pierce	6,462	90.04	674	9.39	41	0.57	5,788	80.65	7,177
Pike	8,303	88.04	1,075	11.40	53	0.56	7,228	76.64	9,431
Polk	11,117	81.50	2,427	17.79	96	0.70	8,690	63.71	13,640
Pulaski	2,452	72.67	905	26.82	17	0.50	1,547	45.85	3,374
Putnam	7,689	75.11	2,497	24.39	51	0.50	5,192	50.72	10,237
Quitman	555	61.26	350	38.63	1	0.11	205	22.63	906
Rabun	6,766	81.89	1,415	17.13	81	0.98	5,351	64.76	8,262
Randolph	1,243	48.46	1,317	51.35	5	0.19	-74	-2.89	2,565
Richmond	21,602	33.67	42,130	65.67	424	0.66	-20,528	-32.00	64,156
Rockdale	9,938	28.47	24,756	70.92	214	0.61	-14,818	-42.45	34,908
Schley	1,526	81.34	339	18.07	11	0.59	1,187	63.27	1,876
Screven	3,422	64.41	1,872	35.23	19	0.36	1,550	29.18	5,313
Seminole	2,255	74.06	773	25.39	17	0.56	1,482	48.67	3,045
Spalding	15,090	61.86	9,146	37.49	159	0.65	5,944	24.37	24,395
Stephens	7,818	83.17	1,501	15.97	81	0.86	6,317	67.20	9,400
Stewart	673	42.78	895	56.90	5	0.32	-222	-14.12	1,573
Sumter	4,921	51.23	4,650	48.41	34	0.35	271	2.82	9,605
Talbot	1,214	42.39	1,628	56.84	22	0.77	-414	-14.45	2,864
Taliaferro	327	40.52	477	59.11	3	0.37	-150	-18.59	807
Tattnall	5,123	78.49	1,359	20.82	45	0.69	3,764	57.67	6,527
Taylor	2,137	66.45	1,069	33.24	10	0.31	1,068	33.21	3,216
Telfair	2,433	71.29	960	28.13	20	0.59	1,473	43.16	3,413
Terrell	1,795	49.10	1,840	50.33	21	0.57	-45	-1.23	3,656
Thomas	11,062	63.99	6,138	35.51	87	0.50	4,924	28.48	17,287
Tift	9,418	72.20	3,546	27.18	80	0.61	5,872	45.02	13,044
Toombs	6,522	76.86	1,920	22.63	44	0.52	4,602	54.23	8,486
Towns	6,066	84.48	1,052	14.65	62	0.86	5,014	69.83	7,180
Treutlen	1,764	72.03	677	27.64	8	0.33	1,087	44.39	2,449
Troup	14,864	63.91	8,262	35.53	130	0.56	6,602	28.38	23,256
Turner	1,994	64.34	1,083	34.95	22	0.71	911	29.39	3,099
Twiggs	1,980	55.93	1,542	43.56	18	0.51	438	12.37	3,540
Union	12,123	84.71	2,070	14.46	119	0.83	10,053	70.25	14,312
Upson	7,096	70.01	2,969	29.29	70	0.69	4,127	40.72	10,135
Walker	18,414	83.26	3,505	15.85	198	0.90	14,909	67.41	22,117
Walton	32,567	76.71	9,573	22.55	312	0.73	22,994	54.16	42,452
Ware	7,855	73.06	2,828	26.30	69	0.64	5,027	46.76	10,752
Warren	1,063	49.28	1,081	50.12	13	0.60	-18	-0.84	2,157
Washington	4,098	52.58	3,665	47.02	31	0.40	433	5.56	7,794
Wayne	8,170	81.50	1,796	17.92	59	0.59	6,374	63.58	10,025
Webster	708	62.32	425	37.41	3	0.26	283	24.91	1,136
Wheeler	1,318	72.18	501	27.44	7	0.38	817	44.74	1,826
White	10,999	86.40	1,618	12.71	113	0.89	9,381	73.69	12,730
Whitfield	20,919	77.44	5,874	21.74	221	0.82	15,045	55.70	27,014
Wilcox	1,998	76.23	613	23.39	10	0.38	1,385	52.84	2,621
Wilkes	2,545	61.35	1,583	38.16	20	0.48	962	23.19	4,148
Wilkinson	2,366	58.33	1,673	41.25	17	0.42	693	17.08	4,056
Worth	5,649	76.39	1,716	23.20	30	0.41	3,933	53.19	7,395
Totals	2,111,572	53.41	1,813,673	45.88	28,163	0.71	297,899	7.53	3,953,408

Counties that flipped from Democratic to Republican

- Baldwin (largest city: Milledgeville)
- Clay (largest city: Fort Gaines)
- Jefferson (largest city: Louisville)
- Sumter (largest city: Americus)

==== By congressional district ====
Kemp won nine of 14 congressional districts.

District	Kemp	Abrams	Representative
1st	60%	39%	Buddy Carter
2nd	48%	52%	Sanford Bishop
3rd	68%	31%	Drew Ferguson
4th	23%	77%	Hank Johnson
5th	19%	80%	Nikema Williams
6th	63%	36%	Lucy McBath (117th Congress)
6th	63%	36%	Rich McCormick (118th Congress)
7th	41%	58%	Carolyn Bourdeaux (117th Congress)
7th	41%	58%	Lucy McBath (118th Congress)
8th	68%	32%	Austin Scott
9th	74%	25%	Andrew Clyde
10th	65%	35%	Jody Hice (117th Congress)
10th	65%	35%	Mike Collins (118th Congress)
11th	62%	37%	Barry Loudermilk
12th	59%	40%	Rick Allen
13th	19%	80%	David Scott
14th	72%	28%	Marjorie Taylor Greene

== Analysis ==
Libertarian Shane T. Hazel, the Libertarian nominee for U.S. Senate in 2020, also declared he would run. This race was one of six Republican-held governorships up for election in 2022 in a state carried by Joe Biden in the 2020 presidential election. Kemp won his first term by a narrow 55,000-vote margin (1.4%) in 2018, which was Georgia's closest gubernatorial election since 1966. In 2022, however, pre-election forecasting showed a solid lead for Kemp throughout and he ultimately won re-election by nearly 300,000 votes (7.5%) - the largest raw vote victory for a Georgia governor since 2006. The race was seen as a potential benefit to Herschel Walker, who ran in the concurrent Senate race, as it was speculated Kemp's strong performance could help Walker avoid a runoff. He underperformed compared to Kemp, however, and narrowly lost to incumbent Democratic senator Raphael Warnock in the December 6 runoff election. This was the first time since 1998 that Georgia voted for different parties for Senate and governor.

=== Voter demographics ===
Voter demographic data was collected by CNN. The voter survey is based on exit polls.

2022 Georgia gubernatorial election (CNN)
Demographic subgroup	Kemp	Abrams	% of total vote
Ideology
Liberals	6	93	18
Moderates	37	61	41
Conservatives	90	10	41
Party
Democrats	4	96	35
Republicans	98	1	41
Independents	49	48	24
Age
18–24 years old	33	66	6
25–29 years old	44	55	6
30–39 years old	46	53	14
40–49 years old	47	51	17
50–64 years old	58	42	32
65 and older	62	37	25
Gender
Men	58	40	47
Women	48	51	53
Marital status
Married	60	39	62
Unmarried	39	59	38
Race/ethnicity
White	74	25	62
Black	9	90	28
Latino	43	55	6
Asian	46	54	2
Other	47	47	3
Gender by race
White men	76	23	31
White women	72	27	30
Black men	14	84	11
Black women	6	93	17
Latino men	44	55	3
Latino women	43	55	4
Other racial/ethnic groups	47	50	4
Education
Never attended college	61	38	16
Some college education	53	47	27
Associate degree	52	47	16
Bachelor's degree	55	43	23
Advanced degree	43	56	17
Education by race
White college graduates	63	36	27
White no college degree	83	17	34
Non-white college graduates	23	75	13
Non-white no college degree	17	82	25
Education by gender/race
White women with college degrees	60	39	13
White women without college degrees	81	18	17
White men with college degrees	66	33	14
White men without college degrees	84	16	18
Non-white	19	79	38
Issue regarded as most important
Crime	52	47	13
Inflation	77	22	36
Immigration	86	13	7
Gun policy	42	57	10
Abortion	24	74	26
Abortion should be
Legal	28	71	53
Illegal	89	10	43
2020 presidential vote
Biden	6	94	42
Trump	97	2	48
Confident your state's elections are accurate
Very confident	43	56	34
Somewhat confident	57	42	42
Not very confident	69	30	15
Not at all confident	79	19	6
Biden legitimately won in 2020
Yes	24	74	58
No	94	5	38
Area type
Urban	34	65	20
Suburban	53	46	53
Rural	67	32	27

== See also ==
- Elections in Georgia
- Political party strength in Georgia
- Georgia Democratic Party
- Georgia Republican Party
- Government of Georgia (U.S. state)
- 2022 United States Senate election in Georgia
- 2022 United States House of Representatives elections in Georgia
- 2022 Georgia House of Representatives election
- 2022 Georgia State Senate election
- 2022 Georgia state elections
- 2022 United States gubernatorial elections
- 2022 United States elections

== Notes ==
Partisan clients
