= Georgia's 82nd House of Representatives district =

State district in Georgia, USA

Georgia's 82nd State House of Representatives district
Representative
Yasmin Neal; R–Griffin
- Demographics: 48.2% White; 16.2% Black; 20.7% Hispanic; 11.0% Asian
- Population: 52,751

District 82 elects one member of the Georgia House of Representatives. It contains parts of Fayette County and Spalding County.

== Members ==
- Mary Margaret Oliver (2013–2025)
- Karen Mathiak (since 2025)
