= Georgia's 73rd House of Representatives district =

State district in Georgia, USA

Georgia's 73rd State House of Representatives district
Representative
Josh Bonner; R–Fayetteville
- Demographics: 63.1% White; 28.1% Black; 4.0% Hispanic; 1.5% Asian
- Population: 56,607

District 73 elects one member of the Georgia House of Representatives. It contains parts of Coweta County and Fayette County.

== Members ==
- Karen Mathiak (2017–2023)
- Josh Bonner (since 2023)
