= Georgia's 72nd House of Representatives district =

State district in Georgia, USA

Georgia's 72nd State House of Representatives district
Representative
| David Huddleston; R–Roopville |
- Demographics: 83.2% White; 5.6% Black; 6.4% Hispanic; 2.9% Asian
- Population: 56,088

District 72 elects one member of the Georgia House of Representatives. It contains the entirety of Heard County and parts of Carroll County and Troup County.

== Members ==
- Matt Ramsey (2007–2016)
- Josh Bonner (2017–2023)
- David Huddleston (since 2023)
