= Chestnut Mountain, Georgia =

- Unincorporated community
- Location within Georgia Location within the United States
- Coordinates: 34°10′21″N 83°50′17″W
- Country: United States
- State: Georgia
- County: Hall
- Elevation: 1,132 ft (345 m)
- Time zone: UTC-5 (Eastern (EST))
  - Summer (DST): UTC-4 (EDT)
- ZIP code: 30502
- Area codes: 770, 470, 678
- GNIS feature ID: 312629

Chestnut Mountain is an unincorporated community in Hall County, Georgia, United States. The community is located along Georgia State Route 53, 8.7 miles (14.0 km) south of Gainesville.

The community was named after J. T. Chestnut, a pioneer citizen.
