= Georgia's 47th Senate district =

State district in Georgia, USA

Georgia's 47th State Senate district
Senator
Frank Ginn; R–Danielsville
- Demographics: 70.0% White; 15.1% Black; 10.4% Hispanic; 2.6% Asian
- Population (2021): 180,029

District 47 of the Georgia Senate elects one member of the Georgia State Senate. It is located in East Central Georgia and contains Madison County and parts of Barrow, Clarke and Jackson counties.

== State senators ==
- Mike Beatty (2000–2003)
- Ralph Hudgens (2003–2011)
- Frank Ginn (since 2011)
