= Josh Bonner =

American politician from Georgia

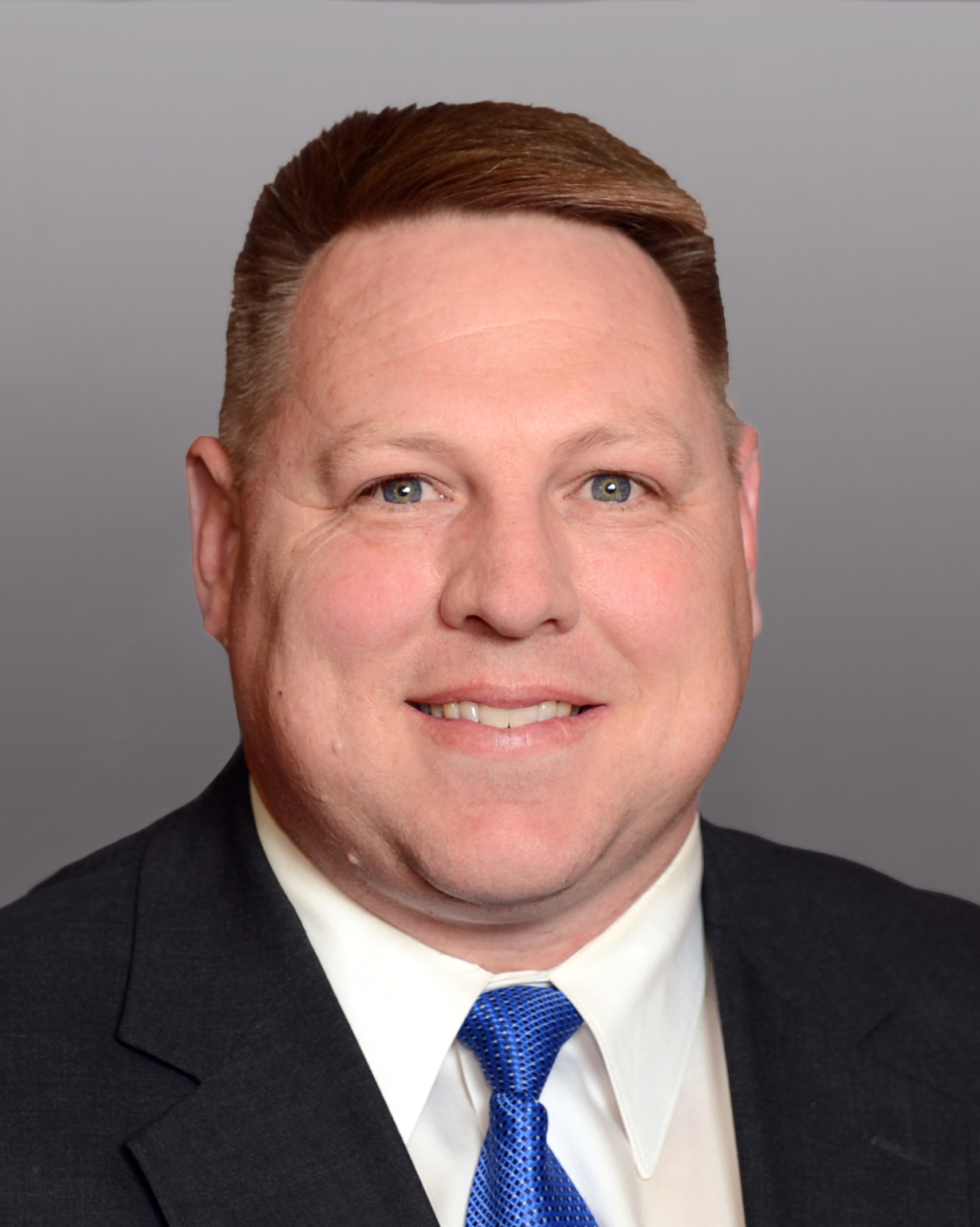

Member of the Georgia House of Representatives
- Incumbent
- Assumed office January 9, 2017
- Preceded by: Matt Ramsey
- Constituency: 72nd district (2017–2023); 73rd district (2023–Present)

Personal details
- Born: May 4, 1974 (age 52) Fayetteville, Georgia, U.S.
- Party: Republican

Josh Nathan Bonner (born May 4, 1974) is an American politician who has served in the Georgia House of Representatives from the 72nd district since 2017. Josh was chosen to represent the people of Fayette and Coweta Counties in the Georgia House of Representatives in 2016. He is now a member of the Human Relations and Ageing, Appropriations, Economic Development, and Tourism, Industry, and Labour, Vice-Chair of the Defense and Veterans Affairs Committee, and Vice-Chair of the Creative Arts & Entertainment Committee. Managing and brokering commercial assets for the South Metro region, he owns Southeast Properties, Inc. Josh joined the American Army after earning his degree from the University of Georgia and served as an active-duty Military Intelligence Officer.

Josh joined the United States Army Reserves in 2001 after he was discharged from active duty. Since then, he has served three foreign deployments in support of the fight against terrorism, including one to Iraq. His current rank is of Lieutenant Colonel.

Georgia House of Representatives
Preceded by Matt Ramsey	Member of the Georgia House of Representatives from the 72nd district 2017–2023	Succeeded by David Huddleston
Preceded by Karen Mathiak	Member of the Georgia House of Representatives from the 73rd district 2023–Present	Incumbent
