= David Huddleston (politician) =

American politician

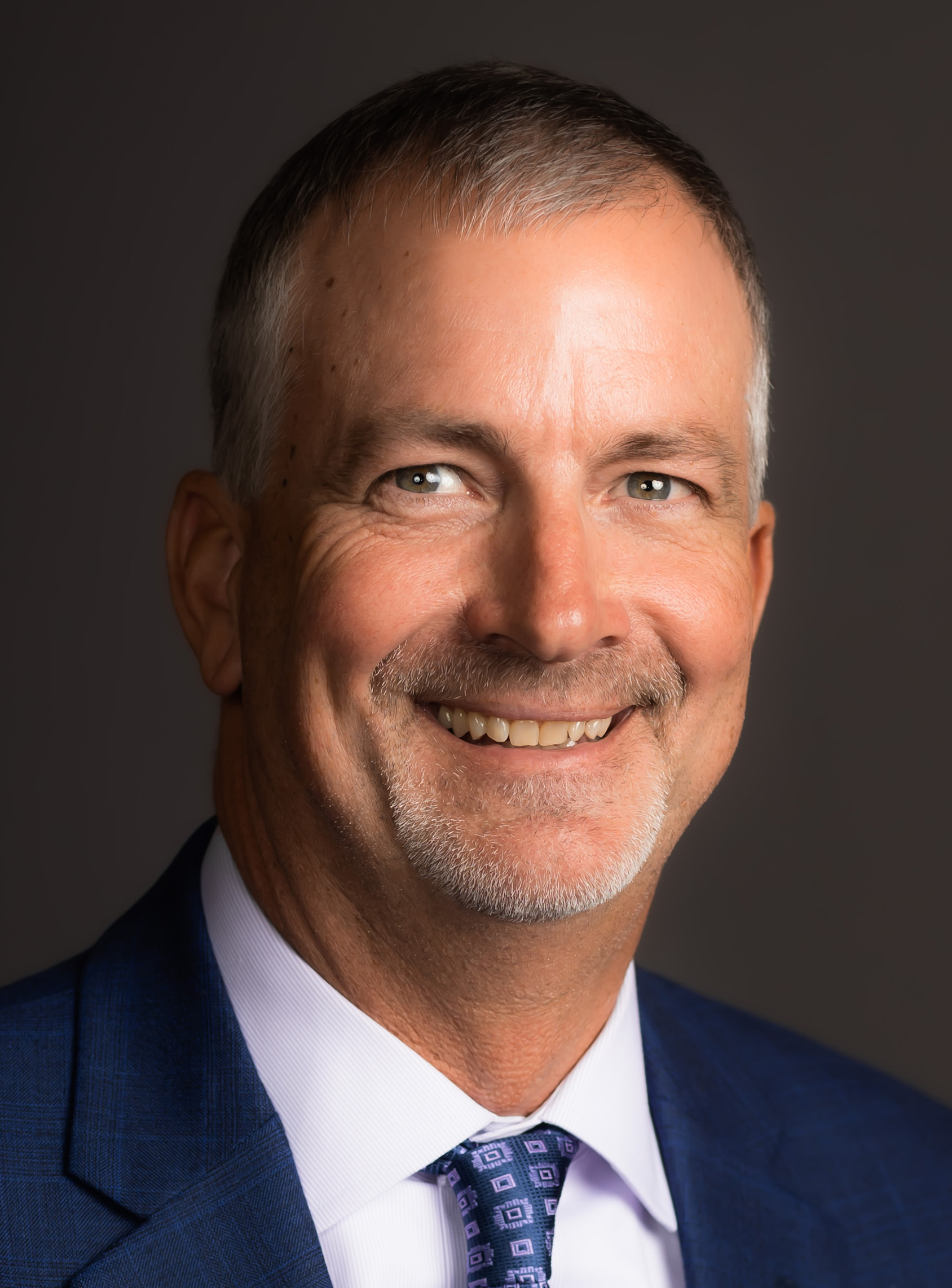
- Official headshot

Member of the Georgia House of Representatives from the 72nd district
- Incumbent
- Assumed office January 9, 2023
- Preceded by: Randy Nix (redistricting)

Personal details
- Born: Carroll County, Georgia, U.S.
- Party: Republican

David Huddleston is an American farmer and politician who has been a member of the Georgia House of Representatives from the 72nd district since 2022.

== Elections ==
In January 2022, Huddleston announced his candidacy for the state house after Representative Randy Nix retired. He ran in District 72 unopposed in the 2022 Georgia state elections.

Huddleston sought reelection in the 2024 Georgia state elections. He defeated Democrat candidate Rodney Ross Moore. Both candidates ran unopposed in their respective party primaries.

2024 General election for Georgia House of Representatives District 72
Party	Candidate	Votes	%
Republican	David Huddleston	21,281	75.5%
Democratic	Rodney Moore	6,909	24.5%
Majority		14,372	51%
David Huddleston hold

== Political positions ==
Huddleston has described himself as an advocate for law enforcement, agriculture, and land conservation.

Huddleston has supported Governor Brian Kemp, serving as the Heard County grassroots leader for his 2022 reelection campaign.

In 2025, Huddleston supported removing a prohibition that would allow bails bondsmen to serve in local elected offices.

He signed onto a bill that would prohibit the use of privately-operated, unmanned speed detectors in school zones.

== Personal life ==
Huddleston is a native of Carroll County, Georgia. In the private sector, he's worked in the agriculture and energy sectors. He serves on many agriculture boards, like the Georgia Cattlemen Association and the Heard and Carroll County High School Ag Advisory Boards.
