= Jason Anavitarte =

American politician

Majority Leader of the Georgia State Senate
- Incumbent
- Assumed office June 17, 2025
- Preceded by: Steve Gooch

Member of the Georgia State Senate from the 31st district
- Incumbent
- Assumed office January 11, 2021
- Preceded by: Bill Heath

Personal details
- Born: Jason Raul Anavitarte; June 14, 1978 (age 48)
- Party: Republican
- Spouse: Jennifer
- Children: 3
- Education: Georgia State University (BA); Georgia Institute of Technology (MS)

Jason Raul Anavitarte (born June 14, 1978) is an American politician from Georgia. Anavitarte is a Republican member of the Georgia State Senate for District 31. He is of Puerto Rican descent.

Before his election to the state Senate, Anavitarte was a member of the Paulding County School Board.

In January 2024, Anavitarte co-sponsored S.B. 390, which would withhold government funding for any libraries in Georgia affiliated with the American Library Association. The bill was drafted following the election of ALA President Emily Drabinski and allegations of the organization promoting a personal ideology and influencing librarian certification.

In June 2025, Anavitarte was elected as Senate Majority Leader.

Georgia State Senate
Preceded by Steve Gooch	Majority Leader of the Georgia Senate; 2025–present	Incumbent
