= Karen Mathiak =

American chiropractor and politician

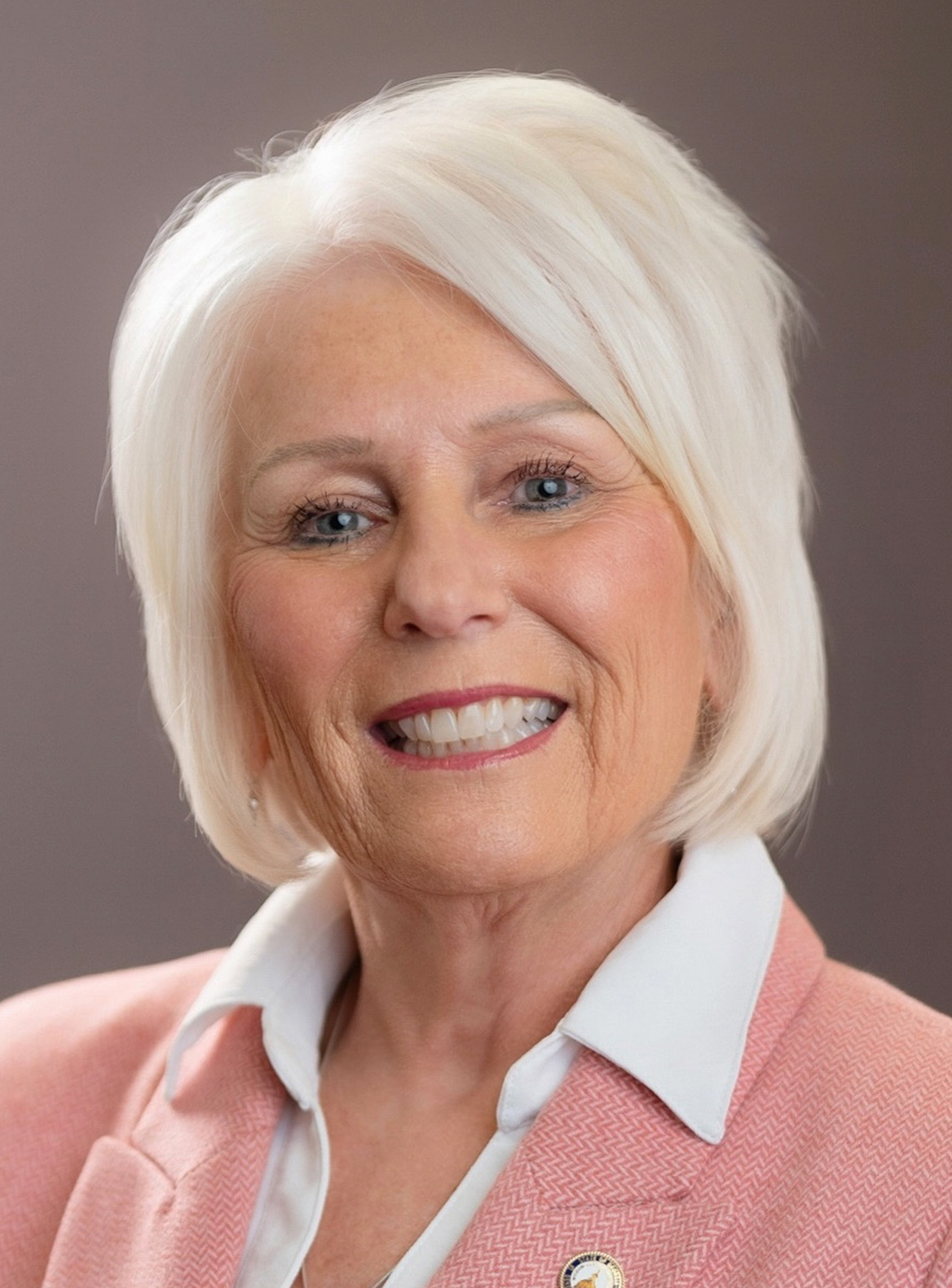

Member of the Georgia House of Representatives
- Incumbent
- Assumed office January 9, 2017
- Preceded by: John Yates
- Constituency: 73rd District (2017–2023); 74th District (2023–2025); 82nd District (2025–Present)

Personal details
- Born: November 6, 1955 (age 70)
- Party: Republican
- Occupation: Chiropractor, politician

Karen Irene Mathiak (born November 6, 1955) is an American chiropractor and politician from Georgia. Mathiak is a Republican member of the Georgia House of Representatives.

== Early life ==
Mathiak was born in Michigan.

== Education ==
In 1984, Mathiak graduated from the Doctor of Chiropractic program from Life University in Marietta, Georgia.

== Career ==
Mathiak started her career as a chiropractic assistant for Dr. Ron Graves. Mathiak became a chiropractor.

In 2003, Mathiak was appointed to become a member of the Georgia Board of Chiropractic Examiners by Governor Sonny Perdue. In 2011, Mathiak was appointed to the Georgia Board of Chiropractic Examiners again by Governor Nathan Deal.

On November 8, 2016, Mathiak won the election and became a Republican member of Georgia House of Representatives for District 73. Mathiak defeated Rahim Talley with 64.53% of the votes. On November 6, 2018, as an incumbent, Mathiak won the election unopposed and continued serving District 73. On November 3, 2020, as an incumbent, Mathiak won the election and continued serving District 73. Mathiak defeated William Harris.

In the 2024 Georgia House of Representatives election, she was redistricted to District 82.

== Personal life ==
Mathiak's husband is Marty. Mathiak and her family live in Griffin, Georgia.

Georgia House of Representatives
Preceded by John Yates	Member of the Georgia House of Representatives from the 73rd district 2017–2023	Succeeded by Josh Bonner
Preceded by Yasmin Neal	Member of the Georgia House of Representatives from the 74th district 2023–Present	Incumbent
