= Bo Hatchett =

American politician

Thomas "Bo" Hatchett III

Member of the Georgia State Senate from the 50th district
- Incumbent
- Assumed office January 11, 2021
- Preceded by: John Wilkinson

Personal details
- Born: October 25, 1989 (age 36) St. Petersburg, Florida
- Party: Republican
- Spouse: Ashley Hatchett
- Children: 4
- Education: Georgia Institute of Technology (B.S.); University of Georgia School of Law (J.D.)
- Website: www.hatchettforgeorgia.com

Thomas Lawrence "Bo" Hatchett III is an American attorney and Republican politician from Cornelia, Georgia, serving as a member of the Georgia State Senate for District 50.

== Early life and education ==
Hatchett was born in St. Petersburg, Florida in 1989 to Thomas and Nora Hatchett. He graduated from Habersham Central High School, lettering four years in swimming and playing varsity football for three years as a quarterback. He played football for Presbyterian College for two years before transferring to Georgia Tech to pursue swimming, where he swam for three seasons and served as a team captain his last two years. He graduated from Georgia Tech in 2013 with a Bachelor of Science in Biology. He later graduated with a Juris Doctor from the University of Georgia School of Law in 2017, serving as a legal intern in Governor Nathan Deal's Office of the Executive Counsel while in school.

== Career ==
Hatchett was first elected to the Georgia Senate in 2020, winning the Republican nomination in a runoff by 37 votes with 50.07% of the total vote and winning the general election with 83.18% of the vote. He was appointed to be one of Governor Brian Kemp's floor leaders during the 2021-2022 session of the General Assembly. After winning reelection in 2022 with 84.78% of the vote, he was reappointed by Governor Kemp to be one of his floor leaders for the 2023-2024 session. He serves on the Children & Families, Reapportionment & Redistricting, Agriculture & Consumer Affairs, Ethics, Health & Human Services, and Judiciary Committees in the Senate.

Outside of elected office, Hatchett is an attorney specializing in personal injury, medical malpractice, and product liability cases.
