= Frank Ginn =

American politician

Member of the Georgia State Senate from the 47th district
- Incumbent
- Assumed office January 10, 2011
- Preceded by: Ralph Hudgens

Personal details
- Born: May 23, 1962 (age 64)
- Party: Republican

Franklin Joseph Ginn (born May 23, 1962) is an American politician who has served in the Georgia State Senate from the 47th district since 2011.

Ginn graduated from the University of Georgia with a Bachelor of Science in Agricultural Engineering in 1985.

In September 2022, while serving as the chairman of the Senate Transportation Committee, Ginn asked a state contractor to allow him to remove steel beams from a bridge demolition site. Ginn later sold these beams to a scrapyard for $10,000.
