= 2010 Georgia House of Representatives election =

- November 2, 2010

All 180 seats in the Georgia House of Representatives 91 seats needed for a majority
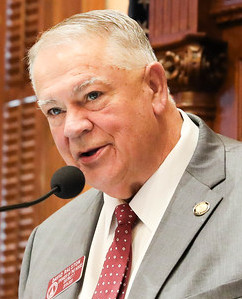

	Majority party	Minority party
Leader	David Ralston	DuBose Porter (retired)
Party	Republican	Democratic
Leader's seat	7th-Blue Ridge	143rd-Dublin
Last election	105	75
Seats before	105	74
Seats after	108	71
Seat change	▲3	▼3
Popular vote	1,328,025	921,242
Percentage	58.85%	40.82%
Swing	▼0.85pp	▲0.52pp
- Results: Democratic hold Democratic gain Republican hold Republican gain Independent hold
Speaker before election
David Ralston
Republican
Elected Speaker
David Ralston
Republican

The 2010 Georgia House of Representatives elections occurred on November 2, 2010, to elect the members to the Georgia House of Representatives. All 180 seats in the state House were up for two-year terms. The winners of this election cycle served in the 151st Georgia General Assembly. It was the last election to the House before the 2010 redistricting cycle based on the 2010 United States census.

Eight state representatives (C. Ellis Black, Amy Carter, Mike Cheokas, Bubber Epps, Gerald Greene, Bob Hanner, Doug McKillip, and Alan Powell) switched from the Democratic to the Republican Party after the election. This gave Republicans a 116-63-1 majority.

== Retiring incumbent Representatives ==
=== Democrats ===
- Rob Teilhet (District-40): To run for state Attorney General
- Georganna Sinkfield (District-60): To run for Secretary of State of Georgia
- Ron Dodson (District-75): Retiring, not seeking other office
- Mike Glanton (District 76): To run for Georgia State Senate in state Senate District 44.
- Kevin Levitas (District 82): Retired after filing deadline passed.
- Randal Mangham (District 94): To run for Governor of Georgia
- DuBose Porter (District-143): To run for Governor of Georgia.
- Jay Shaw (District-176): Retiring upon election to Georgia Department of Transportation Board

=== Republicans ===
- Barry Loudermilk (District-14): To run for Georgia State Senate in state Senate District 52.
- Mark Butler (District-18): To run for Labor Commissioner
- Tom Knox (District-24): To run for Insurance Commissioner
- Mark Burkhalter (District-50): Retiring, not seeking other office
- Fran Millar (District-79): To run for Georgia State Senate in state Senate District 40.
- Bobby Reese (District-98): Retired to run for U.S. House in Georgia's 9th congressional district. He has since withdrawn from the special election, but will still run in the regularly scheduled election
- Mike Coan (District-101): Retiring upon Governor Sonny Perdue's recommendation to head Supplemental Insurance Trust Fund
- Clay Cox (District-102): To run for U.S. House in Georgia's 7th congressional district
- Melvin Everson (District-106): To run for Labor Commissioner
- John Lunsford (District-110): retiring, not seeking other office
- Jeff May (District-111): To run for Georgia Public Service Commission
- Bob Smith (District-113): Retiring, not seeking other office.
- Jim Cole (District-125): Retiring, not seeking other office
- Austin Scott (District-153): To run for U.S. House in Georgia's 8th congressional district
- Bob Lane (District-158): Retiring, not seeking other office.
- Burke Day (District-163): Retiring, not seeking other office.
- Terry E. Barnard (District-166): Retiring, not seeking other office.
- Mike Keown (District-173): To run for U.S. House in Georgia's 2nd congressional district
- Jerry Keen (District-179): Retiring, not seeking other office.

== Incumbents defeated in primary ==
- Daniel Stout (R-District-19) (elected in 2010) was defeated by Paulette Braddock
- Don Wix (D-District-33) (elected in 1998) was defeated by David Wilkerson
- Toney Collins (D-District-95) (elected in 2008) was defeated by Pam Dickerson
- Cecily Hill (R-District-180) (elected in 2002) was defeated by Jason Spencer

== Predictions ==
Source	Ranking	As of
Governing	Safe R	November 1, 2010

== Election results ==
On election day, Republicans made a net gain of three seats. However Republicans would make additional gains when Democratic Representatives changed their party affiliation, though this is not recorded in the table below.

District	Incumbent	Party	Elected	Status	2010 Candidates
1	Jay Neal	Republican	2004	Re-elected	Jay Neal (R) unopposed
2	Martin Scott	Republican	2004	Re-elected	Martin Scott (R) unopposed
3	Tom Weldon, Jr.	Republican	2008	Re-elected	Tom Weldon, Jr. (R) unopposed
4	Roger Williams	Republican	2001	Re-elected	Roger Williams (R) unopposed
5	John Meadows, III	Republican	2004	Re-elected	John Meadows, III (R) unopposed
6	Tom Dickson	Republican	2004	Re-elected	Tom Dickson (R) 77.38% Tommy Patterson (D) 22.62%
7	David Ralston	Republican	2002	Re-elected	David Ralston (R) unopposed
8	Stephen Allison	Republican	2008	Re-elected	Stephen Allison (R) 63.95% Jack Lance (D) 36.05%
9	Amos Amerson	Republican	2000	Re-elected	Amos Amerson (R) unopposed
10	Rick Austin	Republican	2008	Re-elected	Rick Austin (R) unopposed
11	Barbara Reece	Democratic	1998	Re-elected	Barbara Reece (D) unopposed
12	Rick Jasperse	Republican	2010	Re-elected	Rick Jasperse (R) 85.94% Jerry Nally (D) 14.06%
13	Katie Dempsey	Republican	2006	Re-elected	Katie Dempsey (R) 64.64% Bonny Askew (D) 35.36%
14	Barry Loudermilk	Republican	2004	Retired; Republican hold	Christian Coomer (R) 78.54% Dan Ledford (D) 21.46%
15	Paul Battles	Republican	2008	Re-elected	Paul Battles (R) unopposed
16	Rick Crawford	Democratic	2006	Re-elected	Rick Crawford (D) unopposed
17	Howard Maxwell	Republican	2002	Re-elected	Howard Maxwell (R) unopposed
18	Mark Butler	Republican	2002	Retired; Republican hold	Kevin Cooke (R) unopposed
19	Daniel Stout	Republican	2010	Defeated in primary; Republican hold	Paulette Braddock (R) 65.63% Will Avery (D) 21.46%
20	Charlice Byrd	Republican	2004	Re-elected	Charlice Byrd (R) 78.93% Lillian Burnaman (D) 21.07%
21	Calvin Hill	Republican	2002	Re-elected	Calvin Hill (R) 84.87% Stephanie Webb (D) 15.13%
22	Sean Jerguson	Republican	2006	Re-elected	Sean Jerguson (R) 79.70% Bill Brown (D) 20.30%
23	Mark Hamilton	Republican	2006	Re-elected	Mark Hamilton (R) unopposed
24	Tom Knox	Republican	2000	Retired; Republican hold	Mike Dudgeon (R) unopposed
25	James Mills	Republican	1992	Re-elected	James Mills (R) 84.06% Mike Parker (D) 15.94%
26	Carl W. Rogers	Republican	1994	Re-elected	Carl W. Rogers (R) 71.02% Chad Cobb (D) 28.98%
27	Doug Collins	Republican	2006	Re-elected	Doug Collins (R) unopposed
28	Michael Harden	Republican	2008	Re-elected	Michael Harden (R) 73.95% Chris Irvin (D) 26.05%
29	Alan Powell	Democratic	1990	Re-elected	Alan Powell (D) unopposed
30	Tom McCall	Republican	1994	Re-elected	Tom McCall (R) 75.48% Marilyn Bridges (D) 24.52%
31	Tommy Benton	Republican	2004	Re-elected	Tommy Benton (R) unopposed
32	Judy Manning	Republican	1996	Re-elected	Judy Manning (R) 74.14% Kevin Hagler (D) 25.86%
33	Don Wix	Democratic	1998	Defeated in primary; Democratic hold	David Wilkerson (D) unopposed
34	Rich Golick	Republican	1998	Re-elected	Rich Golick (R) 59.50% Maryline Blackburn (D) 40.49%
35	Ed Setzler	Republican	2004	Re-elected	Ed Setzler (R) 64.70% Matthew Adams (D) 35.30%
36	Earl Ehrhart	Republican	1988	Re-elected	Earl Ehrhart (R) unopposed
37	Terry Johnson	Democratic	2000/2004	Re-elected	Terry Johnson (D) 53.32% Jason Shepherd (R) 46.69%
38	Pat Dooley	Democratic	2002/2008	Defeated	Sam Teasley (R) 56.83% Pat Dooley (D) 43.18%
39	Alisha Thomas Morgan	Democratic	2002	Re-elected	Alisha Thomas Morgan (D) unopposed
40	Rob Teilhet	Democratic	2002	Retired; Democratic hold	Stacey Evans (D) 68.51% Scott McDearman (R) 31.49%
41	Sharon Cooper	Republican	1996	Re-elected	Sharon Cooper (R) 66.93% Diane Lore (D) 33.07%
42	Don Parsons	Republican	1994	Re-elected	Don Parsons (R) unopposed
43	Bobby Franklin	Republican	1996	Re-elected	Bobby Franklin (R) unopposed
44	Sheila Jones	Democratic	2004	Re-elected	Sheila Jones (D) unopposed
45	Matt Dollar	Republican	2002	Re-elected	Matt Dollar (R) 74.83% Ruth Levy (D) 25.17%
46	Jan Jones	Republican	2002	Re-elected	Jan Jones (R) 78.09% Paul Kennedy (D) 21.91%
47	Chuck Martin	Republican	2002	Re-elected	Chuck Martin (R) unopposed
48	Harry Geisinger	Republican	2004	Re-elected	Harry Geisinger (R) unopposed
49	Wendell Willard	Republican	2000	Re-elected	Wendell Willard (R) unopposed
50	Mark Burkhalter	Republican	1992	Retired; Republican hold	Lynne Riley (R) unopposed
51	Tom Rice	Republican	1996	Re-elected	Tom Rice (R) unopposed
52	Joe Wilkinson	Republican	2000	Re-elected	Joe Wilkinson (R) unopposed
53	Elly Dobbs	Democratic	2008	Re-elected	Elly Dobbs (D) unopposed
54	Ed Lindsey	Republican	2004	Re-elected	Ed Lindsey (R) unopposed
55	Rashad Taylor	Democratic	2008	Re-elected	Rashad Taylor (D) unopposed
56	Kathy Ashe	Democratic	1991	Re-elected	Kathy Ashe (D) unopposed
57	Pat Gardner	Democratic	2001	Re-elected	Pat Gardner (D) unopposed
58	Simone Bell	Democratic	2009	Re-elected	Simone Bell (D) unopposed
59	Margaret Kaiser	Democratic	2006	Re-elected	Margaret Kaiser (D) unopposed
60	Georganna Sinkfield	Democratic	1982	Retired; Democratic hold	Gloria Bromell Tinubu (D) unopposed
61	Ralph Long III	Democratic	2008	Re-elected	Ralph Long III (D) unopposed
62	Joe Heckstall	Democratic	1994	Re-elected	Joe Heckstall (D) unopposed
63	Tyrone Brooks, Sr.	Democratic	1980	Re-elected	Tyrone Brooks, Sr. (D) unopposed
64	Roger Bruce	Democratic	2002	Re-elected	Roger Bruce (D) unopposed
65	Sharon Beasley-Teague	Democratic	1992	Re-elected	Sharon Beasley-Teague (D) unopposed
66	Virgil Fludd	Democratic	2002	Re-elected	Virgil Fludd (D) unopposed
67	Bill Hembree	Republican	1998	Re-elected	Bill Hembree (R) 58.33% Kimberly Alexander (D) 41.67%
68	Tim Bearden	Republican	2004	Re-elected	Tim Bearden (R) unopposed
69	Randy Nix	Republican	2006	Re-elected	Randy Nix (R) unopposed
70	Lynn Smith	Republican	1996	Re-elected	Lynn Smith (R) unopposed
71	Billy Horne	Republican	2004	Re-elected	Billy Horne (R) unopposed
72	Matthew Ramsey	Republican	2007	Re-elected	Matt Ramsey (R) unopposed
73	John P. Yates	Republican	1988/1992	Re-elected	John Yates (R) 69.96% Rose Carroll (D) 30.04%
74	Roberta Abdul-Salaam	Democratic	2004	Re-elected	Roberta Abdul-Salaam (D) unopposed
75	Ron Dodson	Democratic	1998/2009	Retired; Democratic hold	Yasmin Neal (D) unopposed
76	Mike Glanton	Democratic	2006	Retired; Democratic hold	Sandra G. Scott (D) 92.03% Gail Buckner (WI) 7.97%
77	Darryl Jordan	Democratic	2000	Re-elected	Darryl Jordan (D) 77.75% James Brown (R) 22.25%
78	Glenn Baker	Democratic	2008	Re-elected	Glenn Baker (D) unopposed
79	Fran Millar	Republican	1998	Retired; Republican hold	Tom Taylor (R) 67.73% Keith Kaylor (D) 32.27%
80	Mike Jacobs	Republican	2004	Re-elected	Mike Jacobs (R) 65.96% Sandy Murray (D) 34.04%
81	Jill Chambers	Republican	2002	Defeated	Elena Parent (D) 52.24% Jill Chambers (R) 47.77%
82	Kevin Levitas	Democratic	2006	Retired; Democratic hold	Scott Holcomb (D) unopposed
83	Mary M. Oliver	Democratic	1986/2002	Re-elected	Mary M. Oliver (D) unopposed
84	Stacey Abrams	Democratic	2006	Re-elected	Stacey Abrams (D) unopposed
85	Stephanie Benfield	Democratic	1998	Re-elected	Stephanie Stuckey Benfield (D) 87.14% Ken Quarterman (R) 12.86%
86	Karla Drenner	Democratic	2000	Re-elected	Karla Drenner (D) unopposed
87	Michele Henson	Democratic	1990	Re-elected	Michele Henson (D) unopposed
88	Billy Mitchell	Democratic	2002	Re-elected	Billy Mitchell (D) unopposed
89	Coach Williams	Democratic	2002	Re-elected	Coach Williams (D) unopposed
90	Howard Mosby	Democratic	2002	Re-elected	Howard Mosby (D) unopposed
91	Rahn Mayo	Democratic	2008	Re-elected	Rahn Mayo (D) unopposed
92	Pam Stephenson	Democratic	2002	Re-elected	Pam Stephenson (D) unopposed
93	Dee Dawkins-Haigler	Democratic	2008	Re-elected	Dee Dawkins-Haigler (D) unopposed
94	Randal Mangham	Democratic	2000	Retired; Democratic hold	Dar'shun Kendrick (D) 82.86% Steven Conner (R) 17.14%
95	Toney Collins	Democratic	2008	Defeated in primary; Democratic hold	Pam Dickerson (D) 59.24% Rodney Upton (R) 40.76%
96	Pedro R. Marin	Democratic	2002	Re-elected	Pedro R. Marin (D) unopposed
97	Brooks Coleman, Jr.	Republican	1992	Re-elected	Brooks Coleman, Jr. (R) unopposed
98	Bobby Reese	Republican	1998/2004	Retired; Republican hold	Josh Clark (R) unopposed
99	Hugh Floyd	Democratic	2002	Re-elected	Hugh Floyd (D) unopposed
100	Brian W. Thomas	Democratic	2004	Re-elected	Brian W. Thomas (D) unopposed
101	Mike Coan	Republican	1996	Retired; Republican hold	Buzz Brockway (R) unopposed
102	Clay Cox	Republican	2004	Retired; Republican hold	B.J. Pak (R) 68.57% Porter Deal (D) 31.43%
103	David Casas	Republican	2002	Re-elected	David Casas (R) 60.81% Allan Burns (D) 39.19%
104	Lee Thompson	Democratic	2008	Defeated	Valerie Clark (R) 53.98% Lee Thompson (D) 46.02%
105	Donna Sheldon	Republican	2002	Re-elected	Donna Sheldon (R) unopposed
106	Melvin Everson	Republican	2005	Retired; Republican hold	Brett Harrell (R) 61.95% Steffini Bethea (D) 38.05%
107	Len Walker	Republican	1994	Re-elected	Len Walker (R) unopposed
108	Terry England	Republican	2004	Re-elected	Terry England (R) 99.81% Kirk Howell (I) .19%
109	Steve Davis	Republican	2004	Re-elected	Steve Davis (R) 54.51% Matt Roberts (D) 45.49%
110	John Lunsford	Republican	2000	Retired; Republican hold	Andy Welch (R) 66.41% Rudy Cox (D) 33.59%
111	Jeff May	Republican	2004	Retired; Republican hold	Bruce Williamson (R) unopposed
112	Doug Holt	Republican	2004	Re-elected	Doug Holt (R) unopposed
113	Bob Smith	Republican	1998	Retired; Republican hold	Hank Huckaby (R) 72.47% Suzy Compere (D) 27.53%
114	Keith Heard	Democratic	1992	Re-elected	Keith Heard (D) unopposed
115	Doug McKillip	Democratic	2006	Re-elected	Doug McKillip (D) unopposed
116	Mickey Channell	Republican	1992	Re-elected	Mickey Channell (R) unopposed
117	Lee Anderson	Republican	2008	Re-elected	Lee Anderson (R) unopposed
118	Ben Harbin	Republican	1994	Re-elected	Ben Harbin (R) unopposed
119	Barbara Sims	Republican	2006	Re-elected	Barbara Sims (R) unopposed
120	Quincy Murphy	Democratic	2002	Re-elected	Quincy Murphy (D) unopposed
121	Wayne Howard	Democratic	2006	Re-elected	Wayne Howard (D) unopposed
122	Earnie Smith	Democratic	2009	Re-elected	Earnie Smith (D) unopposed
123	Gloria Frazier	Democratic	2006	Re-elected	Gloria Frazier (D) unopposed
124	Sistie Hudson	Democratic	1996	Re-elected	Sistie Hudson (D) 53.25% Charles Ashfield (R) 46.75%
125	Jim Cole	Republican	2004	Retired; Republican hold	Susan Holmes (R) 64.74% David Gault (D) 35.26%
126	David Knight	Republican	2004	Re-elected	David Knight (R) unopposed
127	Billy Maddox	Republican	2007	Re-elected	Billy Maddox (R) unopposed
128	Carl Von Epps	Democratic	1992	Re-elected	Carl Von Epps (D) unopposed
129	Kip Smith	Republican	2009	Re-elected	Kip Smith (R) unopposed
130	Debbie Buckner	Democratic	2002	Re-elected	Debbie Buckner (D) unopposed
131	Richard H. Smith	Republican	2004	Re-elected	Richard H. Smith (R) unopposed
132	Calvin Smyre	Democratic	1974	Re-elected	Calvin Smyre (D) unopposed
133	Carolyn Hugley	Democratic	1992	Re-elected	Carolyn Hugley (D) unopposed
134	Mike Cheokas	Democratic	2004	Re-elected	Mike Cheokas (D) unopposed
135	Lynmore James	Democratic	1992	Re-elected	Lynmore James (D) unopposed
136	Tony Sellier	Republican	2006	Re-elected	Tony Sellier (R) 69.29% Sharon Howard (D) 30.71%
137	Allen Peake	Republican	2006	Re-elected	Allen Peake (R) unopposed
138	Nikki Randall	Democratic	1999	Re-elected	Nikki Randall (D) unopposed
139	David Lucas, Sr.	Democratic	1974	Re-elected	David Lucas, Sr. (D) unopposed
140	Bubber Epps	Democratic	2008	Re-elected	Bubber Epps (D) 55.53% Allen G. Freeman (R) 44.47%
141	Rusty Kidd	Independent	2009	Re-elected	Rusty Kidd (I) 57.31% Quentin Howell (D) 42.69%
142	Mack Jackson	Democratic	2008	Re-elected	Mack Jackson (D) unopposed
143	DuBose Porter	Democratic	1982	Retired; Republican pickup	Matt Hatchett (R) 54.71% Pablo Santamaria (D) 45.29%
144	Jimmy Pruett	Republican	2006	Re-elected	Jimmy Pruett (R) unopposed
145	Willie Talton	Republican	2004	Re-elected	Willie Talton (R) 57.53% Fenika Miller (D) 42.47%
146	Larry O'Neal	Republican	2001	Re-elected	Larry O'Neal (R) unopposed
147	Buddy Harden	Republican	2008	Re-elected	Buddy Harden (R) unopposed
148	Bob Hanner	Democratic	1974	Re-elected	Bob Hanner (D) unopposed
149	Gerald Greene	Democratic	1982	Re-elected	Gerald Greene (D) unopposed
150	Winfred Dukes	Democratic	1996	Re-elected	Winfred Dukes (D) 66.52% Karen Kemp (R) 33.48%
151	Carol Fullerton	Democratic	2008	Re-elected	Carol Fullerton (D) unopposed
152	Ed Rynders	Republican	2002	Re-elected	Ed Rynders (R) unopposed
153	Austin Scott	Republican	1996	Retired; Republican hold	Tony McBrayer (R) 61.78% John Tibbetts (D) 38.22%
154	Jay Roberts	Republican	2002	Re-elected	Jay Roberts (R) unopposed
155	Greg Morris	Republican	1998	Re-elected	Greg Morris (R) unopposed
156	Butch Parrish	Republican	1984	Re-elected	Butch Parrish (R) unopposed
157	Jon Burns	Republican	2004	Re-elected	Jon Burns (R) 67.36% Elizabeth Johnson (D) 32.64%
158	Bob Lane	Republican	1980	Retired; Republican hold	Jan Tankersley (R) unopposed
159	Ann Purcell	Republican	1990/2009	Re-elected	Ann Purcell (R) 71.93% Tawana Garrett (D) 28.08%
160	Bob Bryant	Democratic	2004	Re-elected	Bob Bryant (D) 77.70% Joseph Woods (R) 22.30%
161	Mickey Stephens	Democratic	2008	Re-elected	Mickey Stephens (D) unopposed
162	J. Craig Gordon	Democratic	2006	Re-elected	J. Craig Gordon (D) unopposed
163	Burke Day	Republican	1993	Retired; Republican hold	Ben Watson (R) 80.18% Jeremy Scheinbart (D) 19.82%
164	Ron Stephens	Republican	1997	Re-elected	Ron Stephens (R) 67.71% Zena McClain (D) 32.29%
165	Al Williams	Democratic	2002	Re-elected	Al Williams (D) unopposed
166	Terry Barnard	Republican	1994	Retired; Republican hold	Delvis Dutton (R) unopposed
167	Roger B. Lane	Republican	2004	Re-elected	Roger B. Lane (R) unopposed
168	Tommy Smith	Republican	1978	Re-elected	Tommy Smith (R) unopposed
169	Chuck Sims	Republican	1996	Re-elected	Chuck Sims (R) unopposed
170	Penny Houston	Republican	1997	Re-elected	Penny Houston (R) unopposed
171	Jay Powell	Republican	2008	Re-elected	Jay Powell (R) 60.51% James Timmons (D) 39.49%
172	Gene Maddox	Republican	2004	Re-elected	Gene Maddox (R) 58.26% Marjean Boyd (D) 41.74%
173	Mike Keown	Republican	2004	Retired; Republican hold	Darlene Taylor (R) 67.73% Haley Shank (D) 32.27%
174	Ellis Black	Democratic	2000	Re-elected	Ellis Black (D) unopposed
175	Amy Carter	Democratic	2006	Re-elected	Amy Carter (D) unopposed
176	Jay Shaw	Democratic	1994	Retired; Republican pickup	Jason Shaw (R) 69.04% Debra Tann (D) 30.96%
177	Mark Hatfield	Republican	2004	Re-elected	Mark Hatfield (R) unopposed
178	Mark Williams	Republican	2006	Re-elected	Mark Williams (R) unopposed
179	Jerry Keen	Republican	2000	Retired; Republican hold	Alex Atwood (R) 61.39% Audrey Stewart (D) 38.61%
180	Cecily Hill	Republican	2002	Defeated in primary; Republican hold	Jason Spencer (R) 69.49% Adell James (D) 30.51%

== Special elections ==
All the following special elections occurred on May 11, with runoffs to be held on June 8 if necessary.

- House district 12: Representative Tom Graves (R) resigned to focus on his campaign for the United States House of Representatives in Georgia's 9th congressional district.

== See also ==
- United States elections, 2010
- United States House of Representatives elections in Georgia, 2010
- Georgia elections, 2010
- Georgia gubernatorial election, 2010
- Georgia lieutenant gubernatorial election, 2010
- Georgia Secretary of State election, 2010
- Elections in Georgia (U.S. state)
- List of Georgia state legislatures
