= Steven Sainz =

American politician

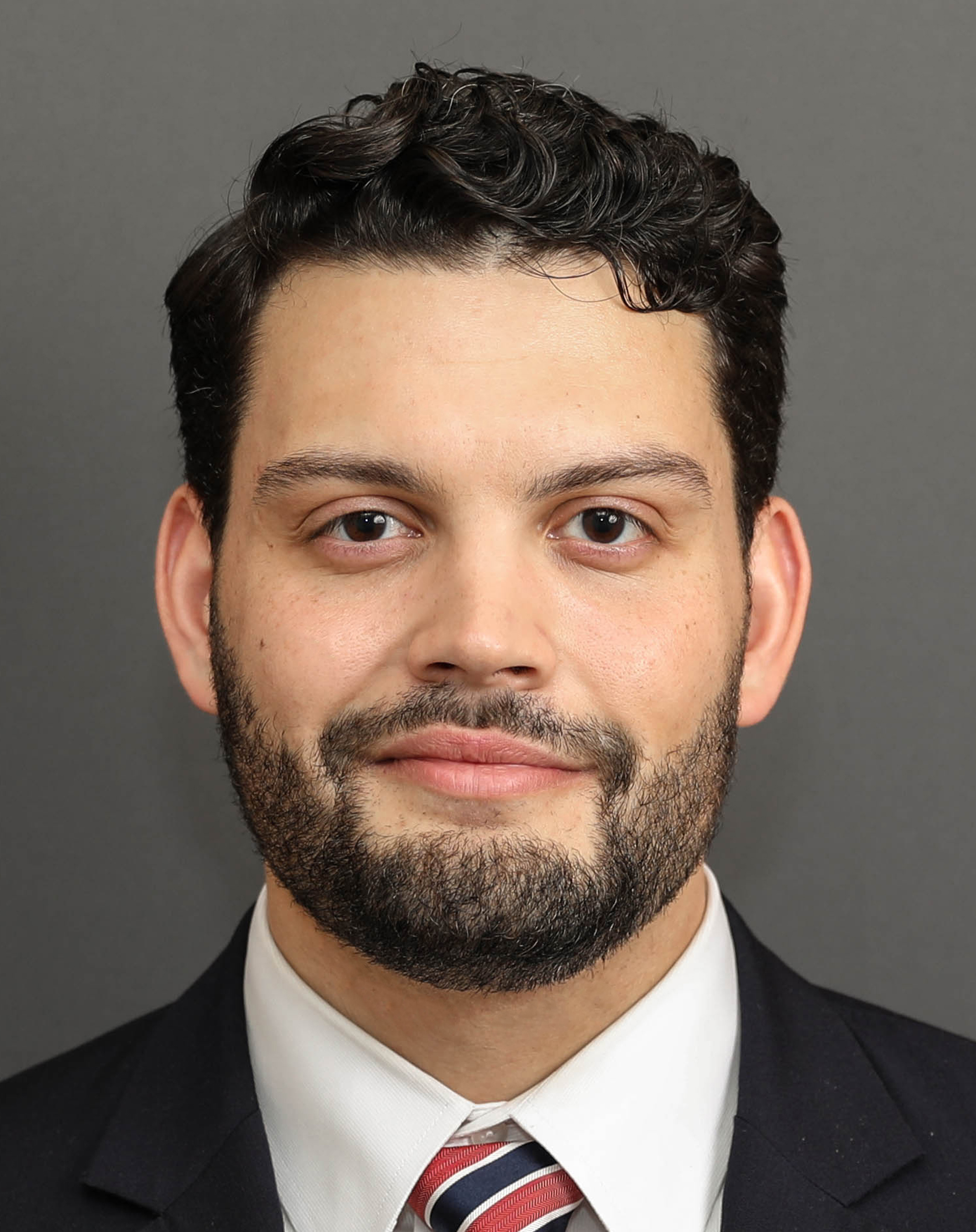
- Official headshot

Member of the Georgia House of Representatives from the 180th district
- Incumbent
- Assumed office January 14, 2019
- Preceded by: Jason Spencer

Personal details
- Born: July 13, 1994 (age 32) San Jose, Costa Rica
- Party: Republican
- Education: Valdosta State University
- Occupation: Nonprofit executive

Steban Steven Sainz (born July 13, 1994) is a Republican member of the Georgia House of Representatives. He represents Georgia's District 180 and has been in office since January 14, 2019.

Before his election, Sainz was the Executive Director of Camden Family Connection, a Georgian nonprofit organization.

Sainz was twenty-three years old when he launched his campaign. He ran unopposed in the 2018 general election after defeating incumbent candidate Jason Spencer in the Republican primary. Spencer was facing criticism at the time for proposing a bill that would ban face coverings such as hijabs, as well as for making controversial comments on the television series Who is America?.

Sainz was subsequently re-elected to his position in 2020, 2022 and 2024. He is of Cuban and Costa Rican descent. He is one of three Hispanic Republicans in the Georgia General Assembly, the other two being Jason Anavitarte and Rey Martinez.
