= Gabriel Sanchez (politician) =

American politician (born 1997)

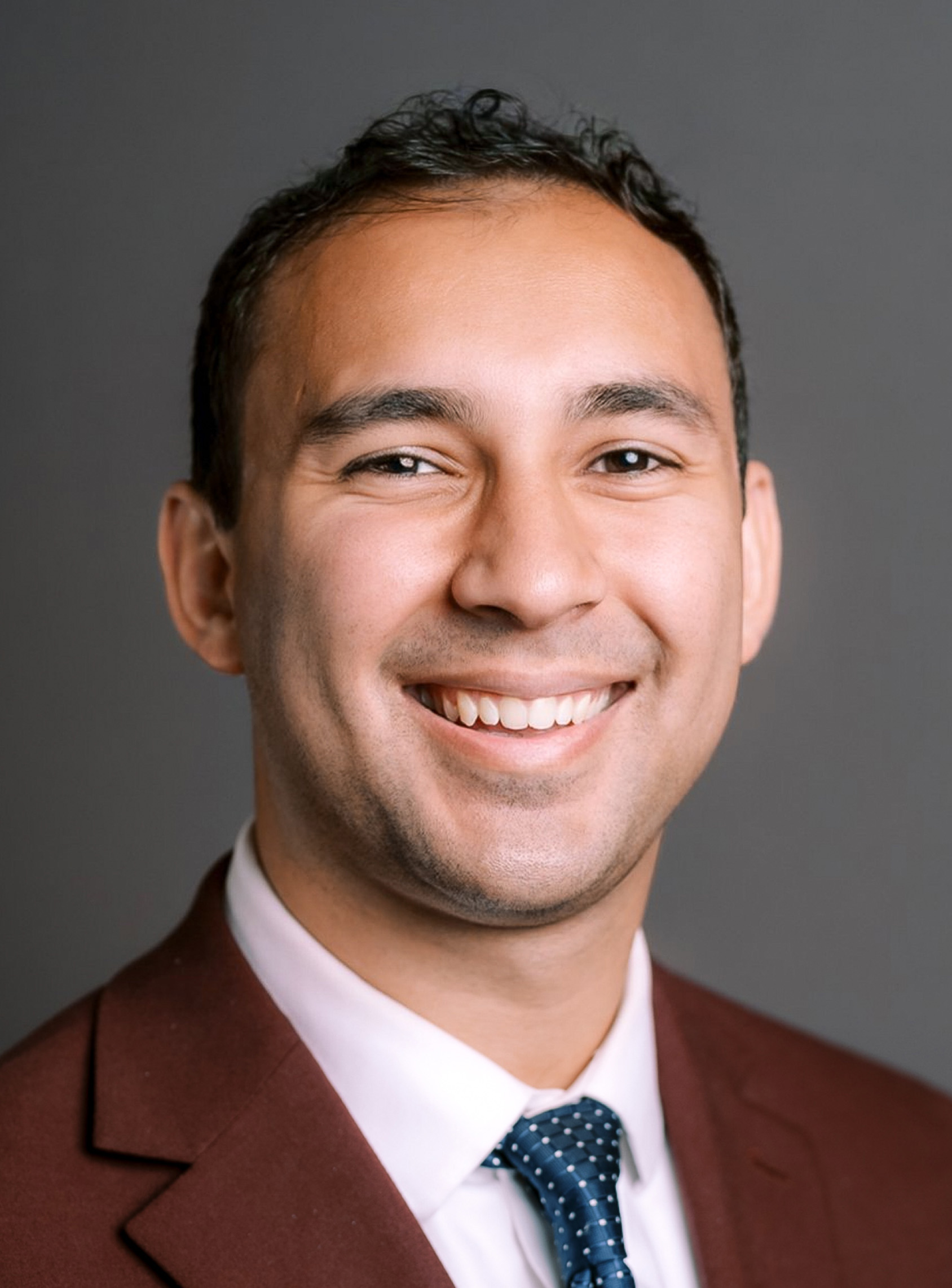
- Official portrait, 2025

Member of the Georgia House of Representatives from the 42nd district
- Incumbent
- Assumed office January 13, 2025
- Preceded by: Teri Anulewicz

Personal details
- Born: April 25, 1997 (age 29)
- Party: Democratic
- Other political affiliations: Democratic Socialists of America
- Website: State House website Campaign website

Gabriel Sanchez (born April 25, 1997) is an American politician who was elected member of the Georgia House of Representatives for the 42nd district in 2024. A member of the Democratic Party, he defeated incumbent Teri Anulewicz in the primary. He is Latino and a self-described socialist.

== Early life and education ==
Sanchez's parents immigrated from Colombia to the U.S. in 1996. He received a film degree from Georgia State University.

== Political career ==
Sanchez worked as a legislative aide to Sam Park and Park Cannon, both members of the Georgia House of Representatives.

Sanchez was as an organizer as part of Atlanta's Stop Cop City movement.

The Atlanta chapter of the Democratic Socialists of America endorsed his campaign for the Georgia House of Representatives.

In 2026, Sanchez introduced legislation to create a single-payer universal healthcare system in Georgia.

=== Political views ===
Sanchez is a democratic socialist. He supports universal healthcare, housing for all, reproductive rights, a $20 minimum wage, paid leave for all workers, criminal justice reform, repealing Georgia's anti-union right-to-work law, protecting the Okefenokee Swamp, and state funding for public transit in Atlanta.
