= Cynthia Starke-Jones =

American politician

Member-elect of the Georgia House of Representatives from the 19th district
- Assuming office January 11, 2027
- Succeeding: Joseph Gullett

Personal details
- Born: Atlanta
- Party: Democratic
- Education: Georgia State University; University of Phoenix; Piedmont University
- Website: Official website

Cynthia Starkes-Jones is an American politician who is a member-elect of the Georgia House of Representatives, representing the 19th district. She was elected to the Georgia House of Representatives, in the general election on November 3, 2026. She unseated Republican incumbent Joseph Gullett. She was born and raised in Atlanta. She is a retired educator.

She previously ran for Paulding County Board of Commissioners in 2022, but lost in the primary election.

She has a bachelor's degree in business administration from Georgia State University and a master's degree in education from the University of Phoenix.
