= Georgia's 111th House of Representatives district =

American legislative district

Georgia's 111th State House of Representatives district
Representative
Reynaldo Martinez; R–Loganville

Georgia's 111th House district elects one member of the Georgia House of Representatives. Its current representative is Republican Reynaldo Martinez.

== Geography ==
Following redistricting for the 2022 Georgia House of Representatives election the district contained parts of the counties of Gwinnett and Walton.

== Elected representatives ==
Representative	Party	Years of service	Hometown	Notes
Geoff Cauble	Republican	2012–2019	Locust Grove	
El-Mahdi Holly	Democrat	2019–2023	Stockbridge	Redistricted to 116th District
Reynaldo Martinez	Republican	2023–present	Loganville	
