= El-Mahdi Holly =

American politician

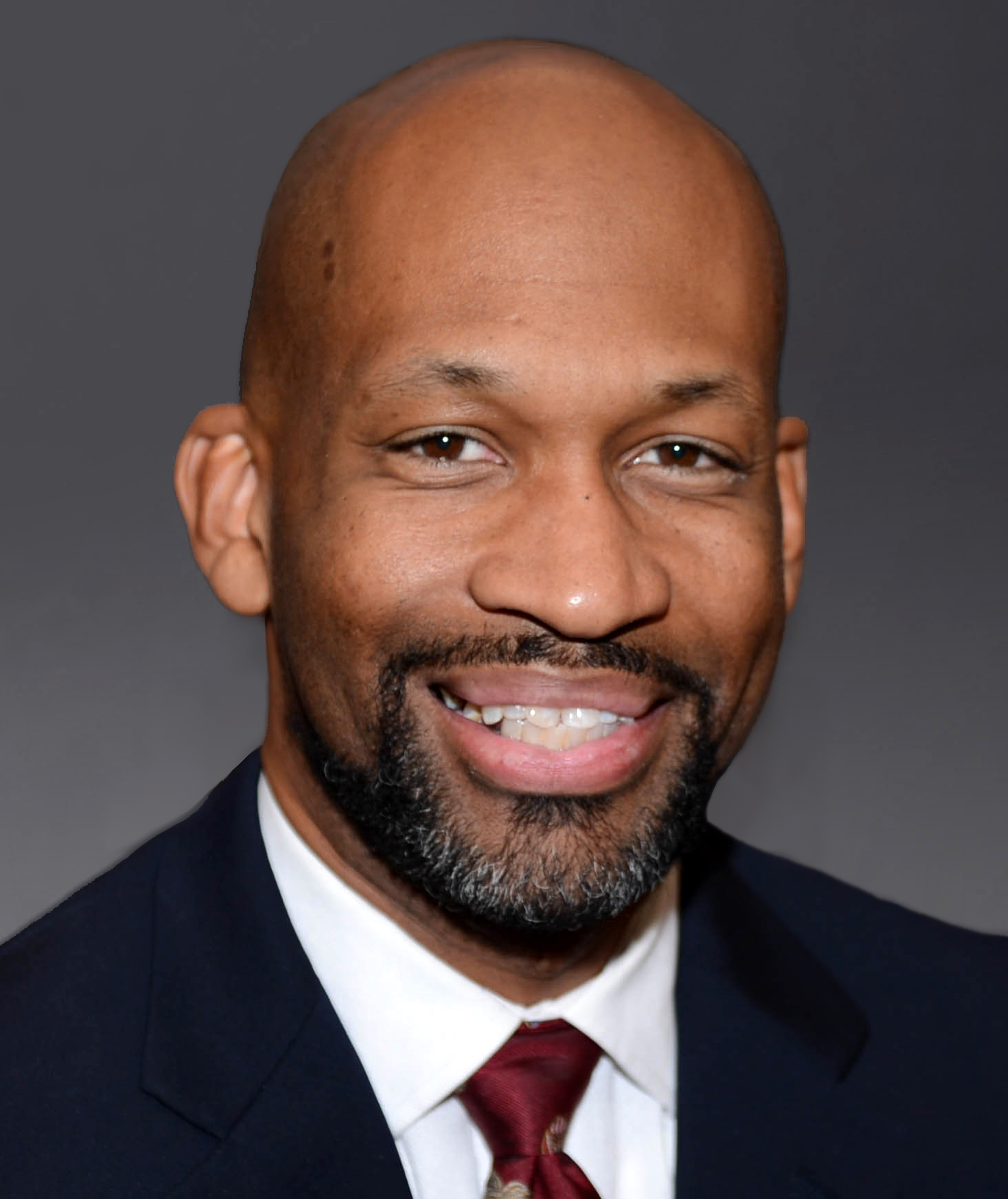

Member of the Georgia House of Representatives
- Incumbent
- Assumed office January 14, 2019
- Preceded by: Geoffrey Cauble
- Constituency: 111th District (2019–2022); 116th District (2022–Present)

Personal details
- Born: February 16, 1976 (age 50)
- Party: Democratic
- Education: Morehouse College, University of West Georgia
- Occupation: Politician

El-Mahdi E. Holly (born February 16, 1976) is an American politician from the state of Georgia. A member of the Democratic Party, Holly has served in the Georgia House of Representatives for the 111th and 116th district.

Holly ran in a special election for the Georgia House to fill the remainder of the term of Brian Strickland in January 2018. In the nonpartisan blanket election, Republican Geoffrey Cauble earned 51% of the 3,652 total votes, while Holly finished in second place with 30%, fellow Democrat Tarji Leonard Dunn got 12%, and Republican Larry Morey received 6%. Holly ran again in the November 2018 general election. After 4 back-to-back races that year, Holly won an upset victory over the incumbent, pulling a 13-point lead and 16,143 votes over Cauble's 12,385 votes, essentially flipping the semi-rural district out of Republican control.

In the 2022 Georgia House of Representatives election he was redistricted to District 116. The 11th district went to Republican Reynaldo Martinez.

== Political career ==
Representative El-Mahdi Holly, who has a long history of working as a community organizer for regional and national nonprofits, gathered a wide range of local support to win a convincing majority of the vote for his race in House District 111. The only legislative district exclusively located in Henry County, it spans through Hampton, McDonough, Locust Grove, Stockbridge, Jonesboro and Jenkinsburg.

Holly's committee assignments include Industry and Labor, Transportation and Code Revision.

=== Endorsements ===
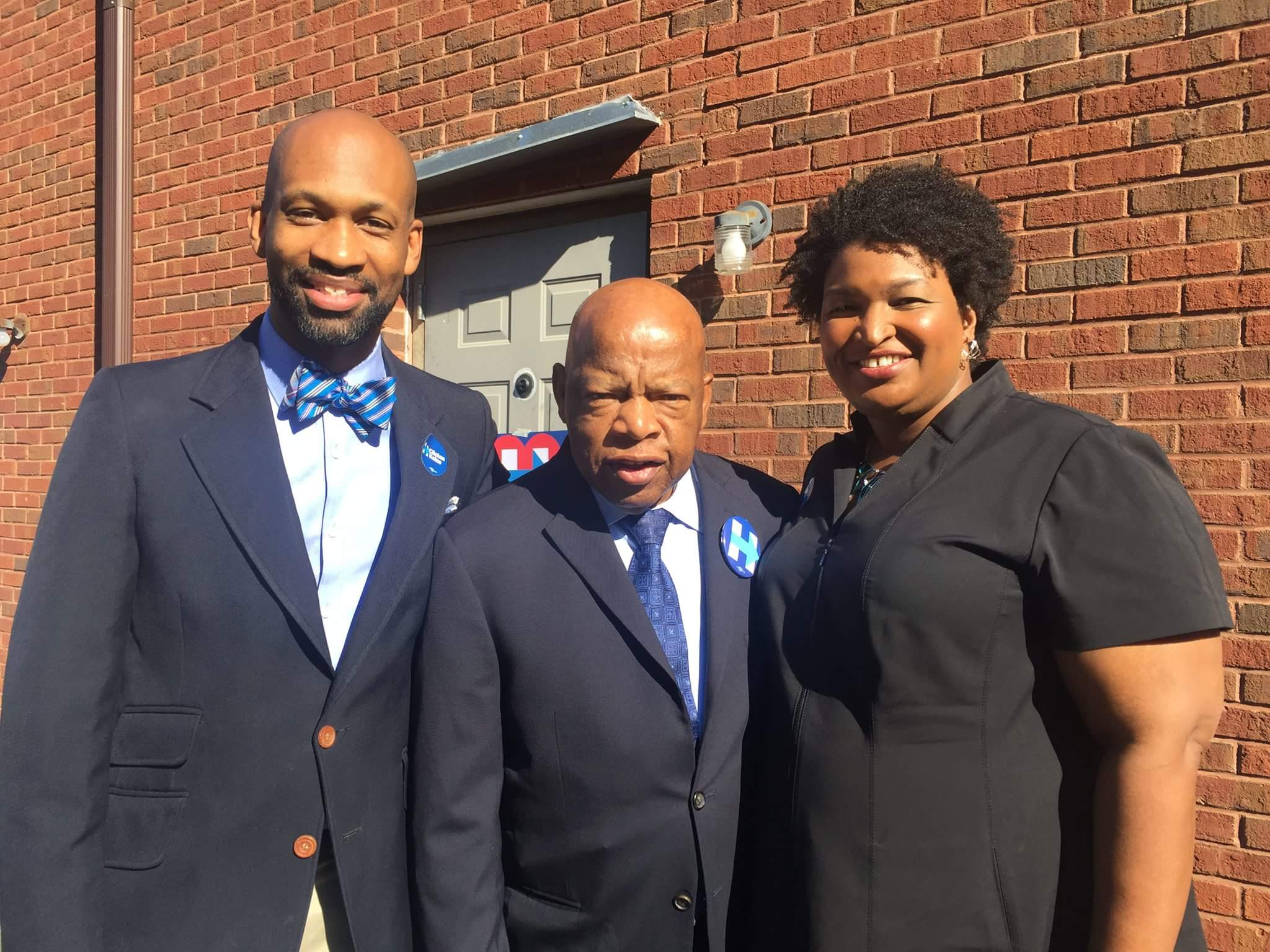
El-Mahdi Holly. Hon. John Lewis. Stacey Abrams

Holly's work has gained support locally and nationally. His public service record has been supported by national organizations including the state's American Civil Liberties Union, and the Georgia chapter of the National Association for the Advancement of Colored People, both of whom have given Holly high marks for his voting record. Other supporters of renown include Democracy for America, Fair Fight Action, Our Revolution Georgia, and Georgia Equality. The Georgia Association of Educators has also taken a keen interest to support Holly.

A staunch proponent for upgrading the state's workforce, Holly is also supported by the Atlanta North Georgia Labor Council, which represents the state's AFL-CIO's labor union community, including the Teamsters, Communications Workers of America, and United Food Commercial Workers Union. Fellow colleagues and leaders within the Georgia Democratic Party including Stacey Abrams and Stacey Evans (D- 57) have endorsed him as well.

=== Legislative highlights ===
El-Mahdi Holly has sponsored and/or co-sponsored over 127 pieces of legislation to date, of which several have made it to the floor and signed by the governor. In 2021, Holly sponsored the bill which sought to stop the carving up of incorporated cities. This had major implications leading to the failed movement to de-annex Buckhead from the city of Atlanta. He also co-sponsored a bipartisan measure which was eventually signed into law that stopped worker misclassification. This was a major win celebrated by both parties as it prohibited employers from defrauding the state of Georgia and their workforce in relations to tax obligations. Holly was also the mastermind in getting the City of Locust Grove 100% homestead exemption by placing a local referendum on the 2022 general election ballot.

=== Caucus assignments ===
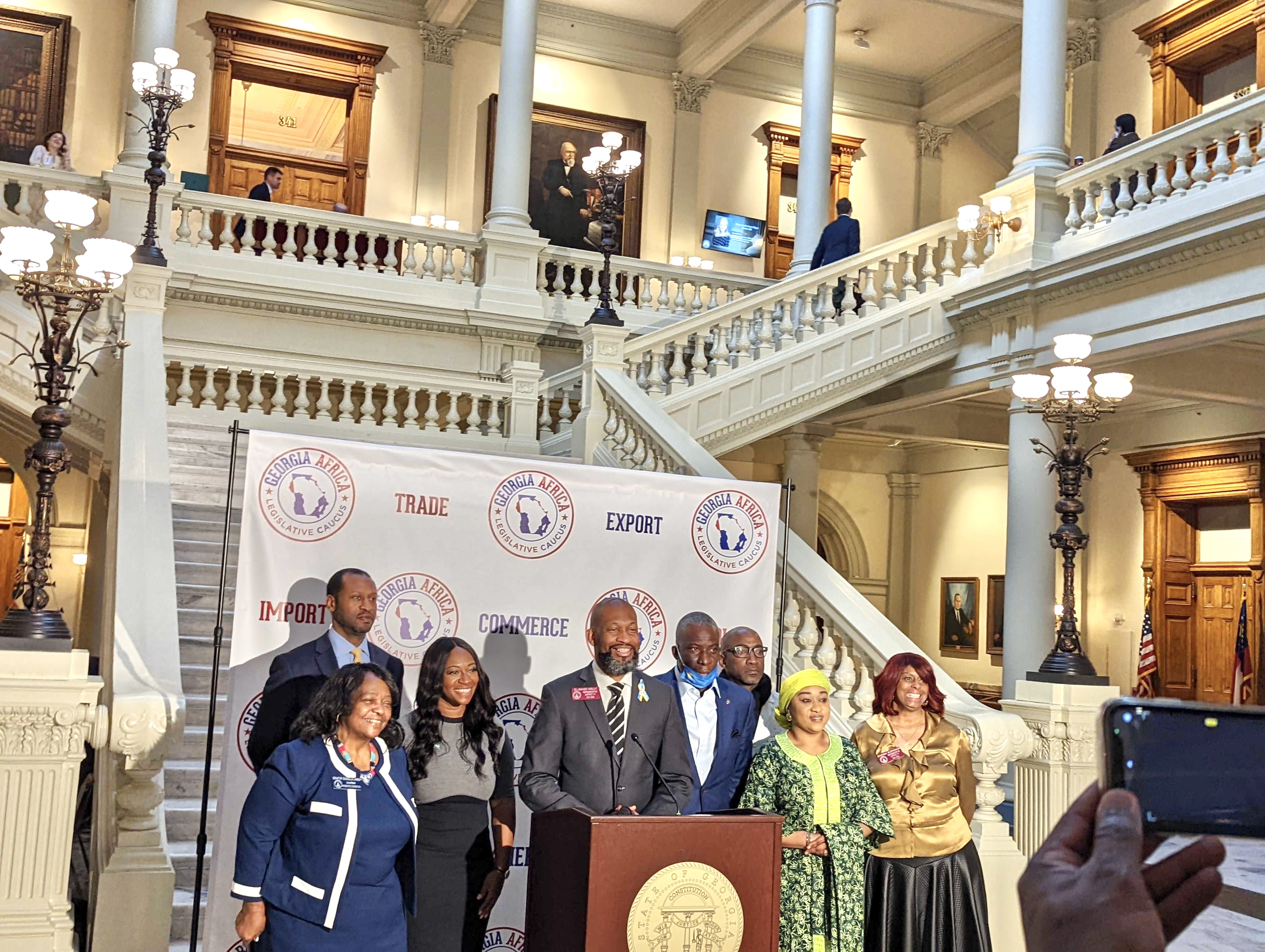
Georgia Africa Legislative Caucus soft launch press conference with Consulate General Dr. Amina Smaila of the Federal Republic of Nigeria.

Holly's caucus assignments include the Working Families Caucus, GA Bipartisan Criminal Justice Caucus, Georgia-Japan Legislative Caucus, and serving on the executive committee of the Georgia Legislative Black Caucus, the nation's largest caucus of black state legislators.

Recognizing the need for Georgia businesses to cultivate new relationships and gain further access to burgeoning African markets in the world's largest free trade area, Holly passed HR 349 and convened a select group of subject matter expert advisors to launch the Georgia Africa Legislative Caucus.

== Community involvement ==
COVID-19 impacted Henry County families at a disproportionate rate, resulting in heavy job loss and food insecurity. Seeing the gap in services, Holly hosted the #GiveThanks food giveaways during the pandemic that fed 17,000 local Henry County families.

El-Mahdi Holly remains committed to the community, serving as a board member of sickle cell anemia awareness nonprofit organization, My Three Sicklers Foundation. He also serves as the Education Co-Pillar for Black Male Initiative Georgia, which seeks to change the narrative around black men in society.

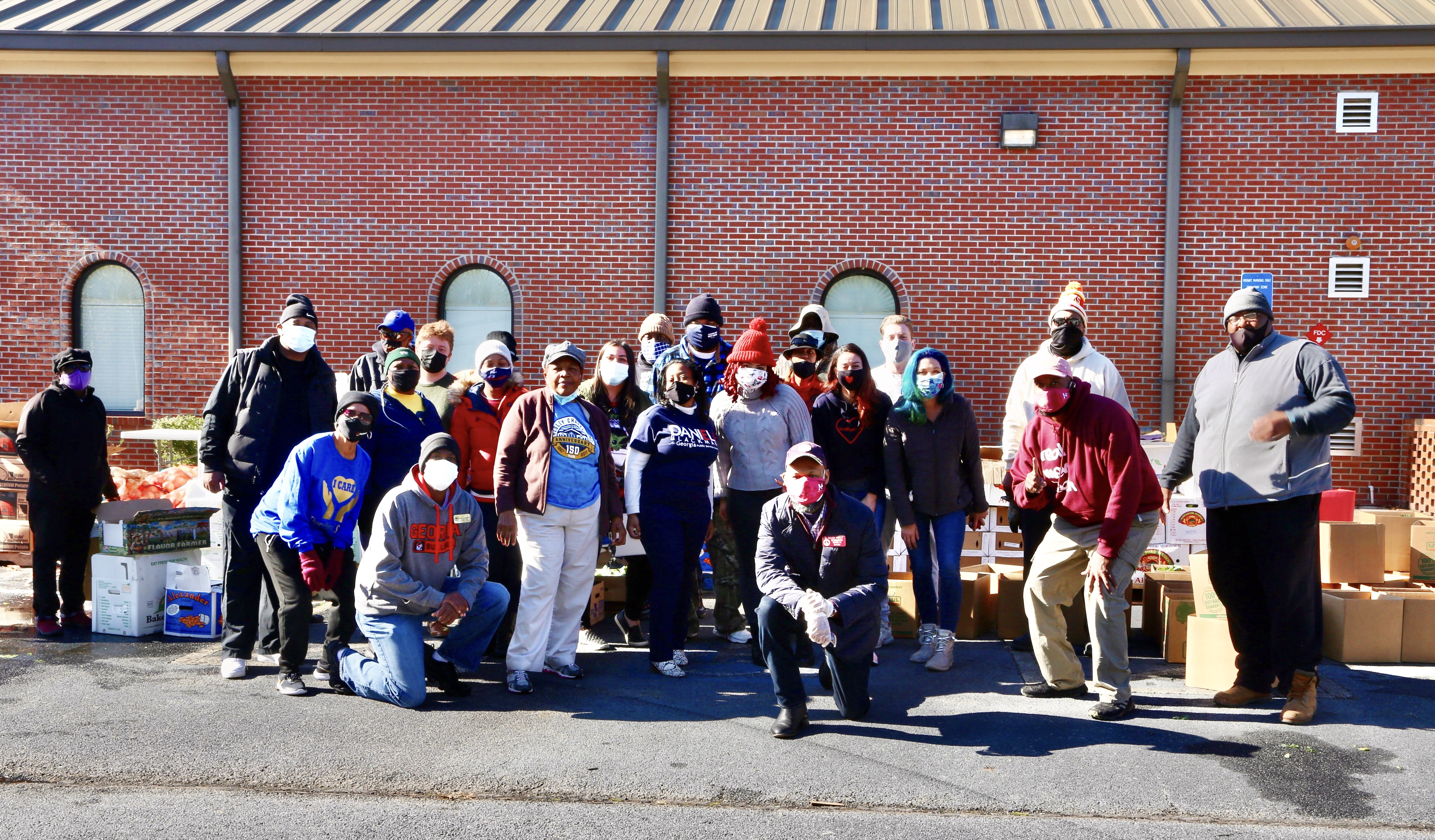
The #GiveThanks Food Giveaway fed 17,000 Henry County families

== Awards ==
Over the course of his years in public service, Holly has been recognized as a standout in nonprofit circles. The Georgia Council on Developmental Disabilities recognized him with its Legislative Champion Award. This came in response to Holly's work on HR372, which strengthens the GA Employment Council and work to move away from subpar minimum wage practices.

Every year, the AJC compiles a list of the best dressed lawmakers from legislative session, ranking Holly #4 in 2022.

In 2023, Georgia Legislative Black Caucus, the nation's largest caucus of 71 Black/African American state lawmakers, awarded El-Mahdi Holly with the House Legislator of the Year Award.

Georgia House of Representatives
Preceded by Geoffrey Cauble	Member of the Georgia House of Representatives from the 111th district 2019–2023	Succeeded by Reynaldo Martinez
Preceded by Terry England	Member of the Georgia House of Representatives from the 116th district 2023–Present	Incumbent
