= Georgia's 180th House of Representatives district =

State district in Georgia, USA

Georgia's 180th State House of Representatives district
Representative
Steven Sainz; R–St. Marys
- Demographics: 70.8% White; 18.3% Black; 5.8% Hispanic; 1.6% Asian
- Population: 54,581

District 180 elects one member of the Georgia House of Representatives. It contains the entirety of Camden County as well as parts of Glynn County.

== Members ==
- Cecily Hill (until 2011)
- Jason Spencer (2011–2019)
- Steven Sainz (since 2019)
