= Joseph Gullett =

American politician

Representative Joseph Gullett
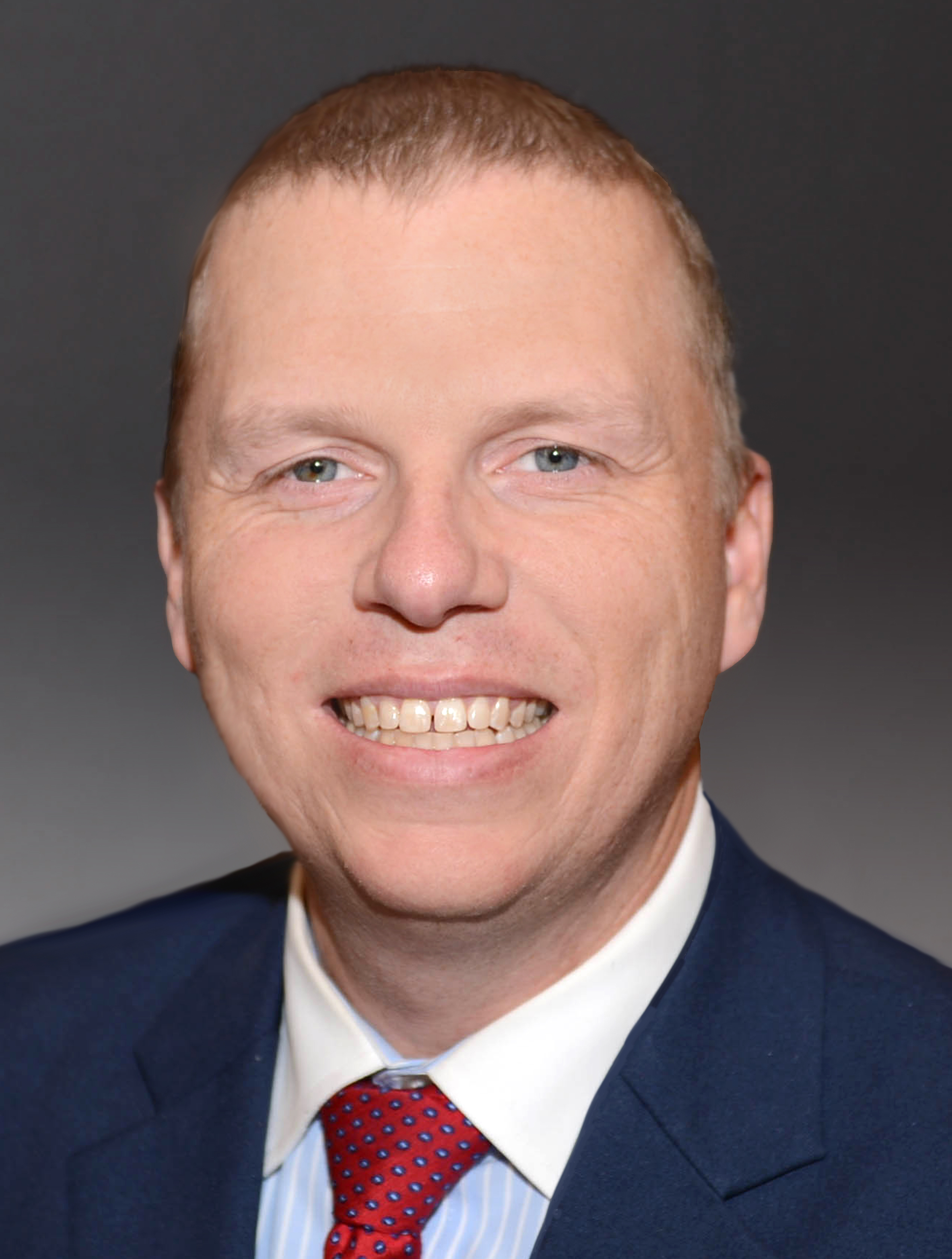

Member of the Georgia House of Representatives from the 19th district
- Incumbent
- Assumed office 2019
- Preceded by: Paulette Rakestraw
- Succeeded by: Cynthia Starke-Jones

Personal details
- Born: Joseph Brian Gullett; March 27, 1980 (age 46)

Joseph Brian Gullett (born March 27, 1980) is an American politician who is a Georgia State Representative, currently representing the 19th District. He was elected in 2018 and was sworn into office on January 14, 2019. He currently serves as chairman of Appropriations overseeing the Judiciary, member of Governmental Affairs, member of Insurance, member of Judiciary Non-Civil, member of Banks and Banking, member of Technology and Innovation, and member of Juvenile Justice. Legislatively he focuses on holding the powerful accountable, improving the Georgia foster care system, and supporting public safety.

== Election ==
Gullett defeated the long term incumbent Paulette Rakestraw in a Republican party runoff in July 2018. He was endorsed by the Paulding County sheriff.

Gullet lost the re-election campaign for his House seat in 2026 to Democrat Cynthia Starke-Jones.

== Legislation ==
In 2019, Gullett proposed legislation which would prevent railroad companies from blocking train crossings for long periods of time.

In 2021, Gullett was the lead sponsor for legislation that restricts local Governments from fining alarm companies for false alarms when the false alarms were not the fault of the company.

Gullett also was the lead sponsor on legislation that would restrict local boards of elections from accepting private money. Ultimately, this was embedded in the Election Integrity Act of 2021.

In addition, Gullett sponsored a bill that would allow Remote Online Notary in Georgia as well as legislation that would create an oversight commission for District Attorneys across the state.
