= Gregg Kennard =

American minister and politician (born 1966)

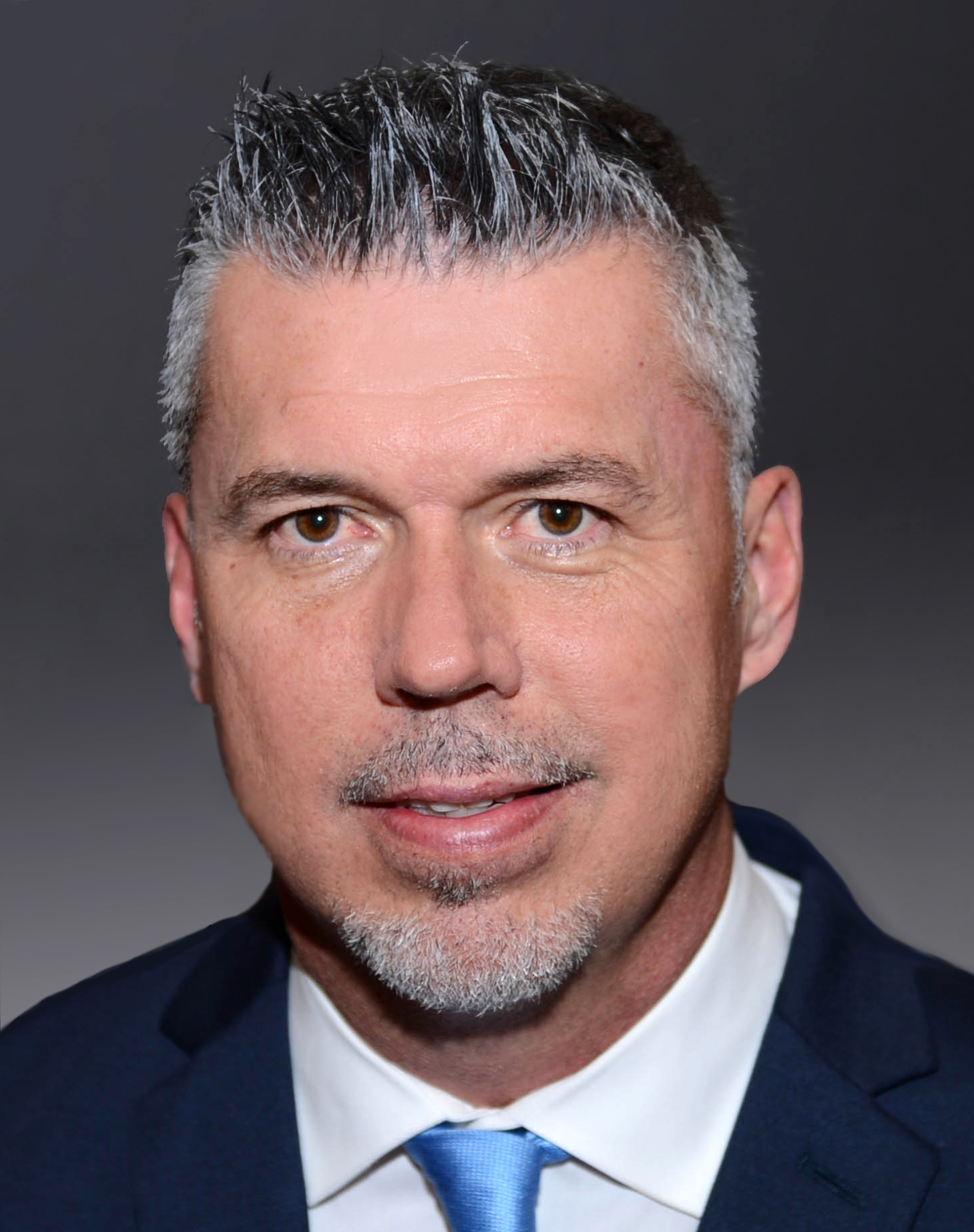
- Official portrait, 2019

Member of the Georgia House of Representatives
- In office January 14, 2019 – January 13, 2025
- Preceded by: Buzz Brockway
- Succeeded by: Scott Holcomb (redistricting)
- Constituency: 102nd District (2019–2023); 101st District (2023–2025)

Personal details
- Born: William Gregory Kennard; January 27, 1966 (age 60) Atlanta, Georgia, U.S.
- Party: Democratic
- Spouse: Pam
- Children: 3
- Occupation: Minister

William Gregory Kennard (born January 27, 1966) is an American politician. A member of the Democratic Party, he was a member of the Georgia House of Representatives from 2019 to 2025.

== Career ==
Kennard is the founder and senior pastor of NSpire, an outreach program in Atlanta.

In 2018, Kennard was elected to represent District 102 in the Georgia House of Representatives. He was re-elected in 2020.

Kennard sat on the following committees:

- Industry and Labor
- Motor Vehicles
- Small Business Development

=== Electoral history ===
2018 Democratic primary: Georgia House of Representatives, District 102
Party	Candidate	Votes	%
Democratic	Gregg Kennard	1,528	71.4%
Democratic	Tony Scalzitti	611	28.6%

2018 general election: Georgia House of Representatives, District 102
Party	Candidate	Votes	%
Democratic	Gregg Kennard	10,617	51.4%
Republican	Paula Hastings	10,033	48.6%

== Personal life ==
Kennard is married and has three children. Kennard is a Life Coach.

Georgia House of Representatives
Preceded by Buzz Brockway	Member of the Georgia House of Representatives from the 102nd district 2019–2023	Succeeded by Gabe Okoye
Preceded by Sam Park	Member of the Georgia House of Representatives from the 101st district 2023–2025	Succeeded by Scott Holcomb
