= Gabe Okoye =

American politician

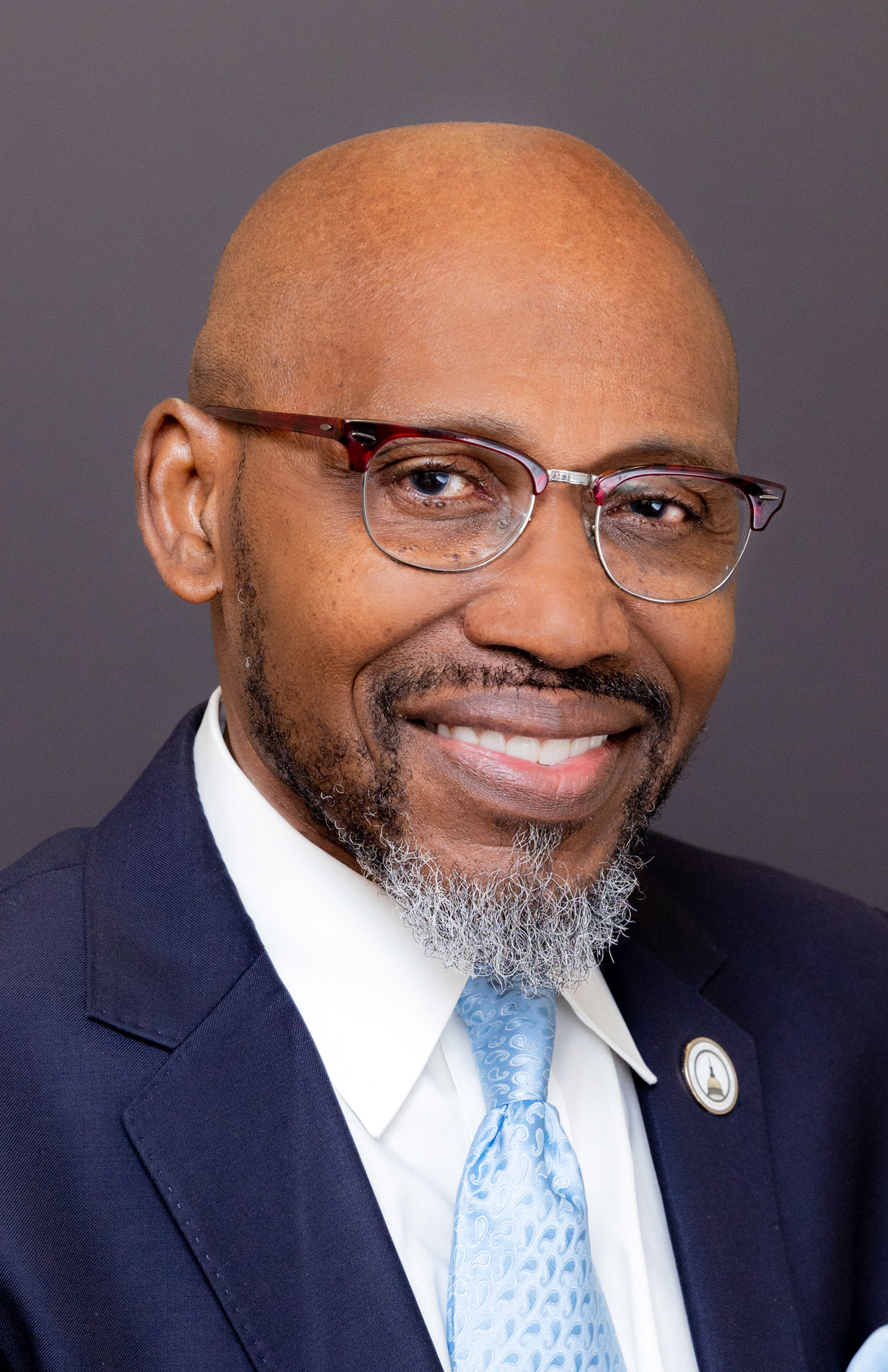

Member of the Georgia House of Representatives from the 102nd district
- Incumbent
- Assumed office January 9, 2023
- Preceded by: Constituency established

Personal details
- Citizenship: United States; Nigeria

Gabe Onuora Okoye is Nigerian–American civil engineer, former chair, and a current commissioner of planning in Gwinnett County. On November 8, 2022, he became a member of the Georgia House of Representatives in the 2022 election representing Georgia's 102nd House of Representatives district and he took office on January 9, 2023.

== Biography ==
Okoye is a native of Enugwu-Agidi . He relocated to United States in 1981. He began working as a security guard. He later enrolled in college where he became a civil engineer and eventually founded a company called Essex Geoscientist. Okoye is married with four children and has been living in Atlanta since 1992

== Political career ==
Okoye is a Democrat and he became the Gwinnett party chairman in 2016. In 2018, he recorded massive wins that captured 13 seats out of the 25 seats available in the county. This historic wins made the Georgia House of Representatives with Resolution 313 of 2019 declared November 6 of 2019 as Gabe Okoye Leadership Day.

Georgia House of Representatives
Preceded by Gregg Kennard	Member of the Georgia House of Representatives from the 102nd district 2023–Present	Incumbent
