= Georgia's 173rd House of Representatives district =

State district in Georgia, USA

Georgia's 173rd State House of Representatives district
Representative
Darlene Taylor; R–Thomasville
- Demographics: 53.6% White; 36.5% Black; 7.4% Hispanic; 0.4% Asian
- Population: 55,196

District 173 elects one member of the Georgia House of Representatives. It contains parts of Grady County and Thomas County.

== Members ==
- Mike Keown (2004–2010)
- Darlene Taylor (since 2011)
