= Georgia's 85th House of Representatives district =

State district in Georgia, USA

Georgia's 85th State House of Representatives district
Representative
Karla Drenner; D–Avondale Estates
- Demographics: 21.4% White; 55.1% Black; 4.3% Hispanic; 16.5% Asian
- Population: 56,526

District 85 elects one member of the Georgia House of Representatives. It contains parts of DeKalb County.

== Members ==
- Karla Drenner (since 2013)
