= Holt Persinger =

American politician

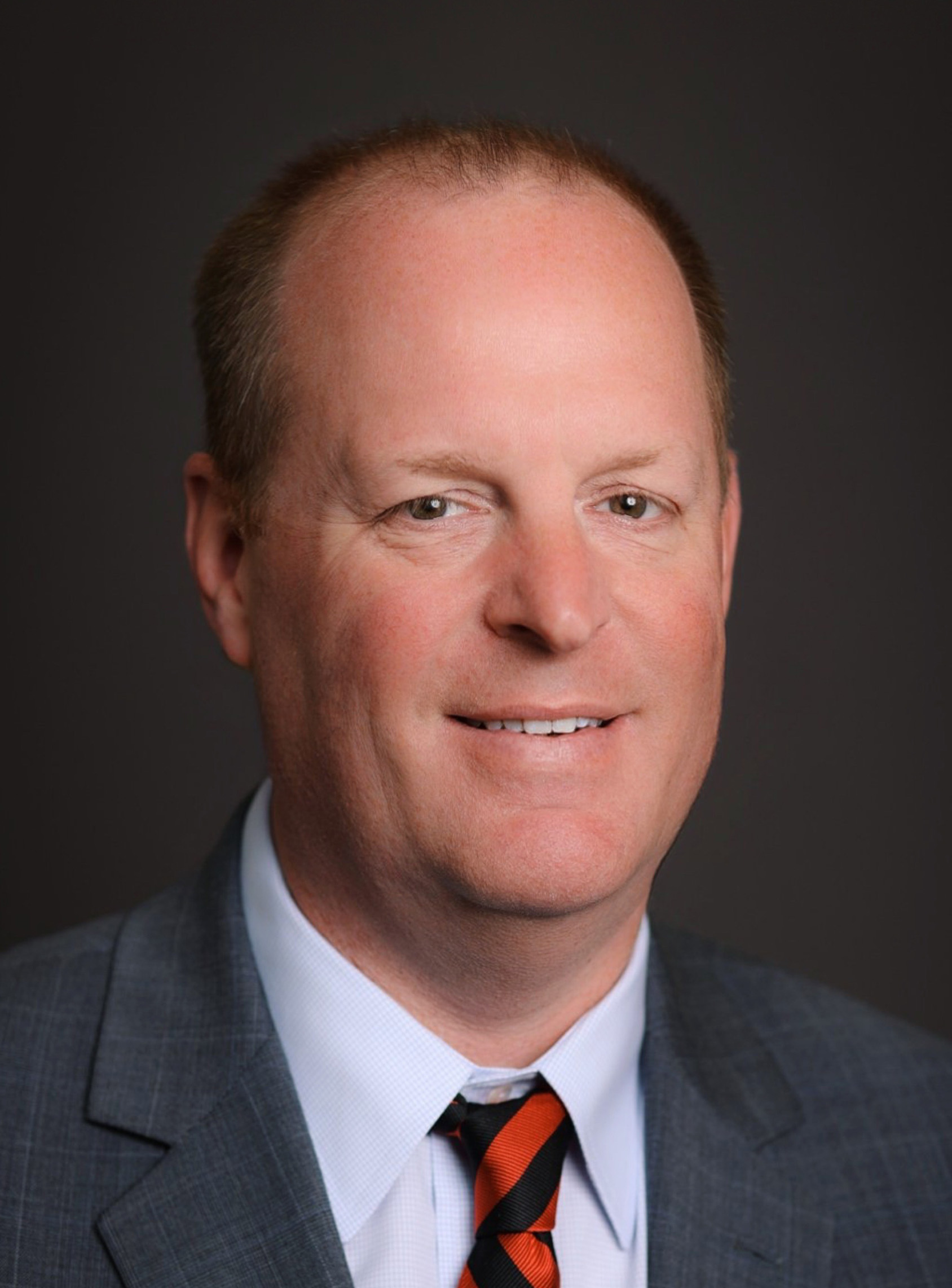
- Official headshot

Member of the Georgia House of Representatives from the 119th district
- Incumbent
- Assumed office March 6, 2023
- Preceded by: Terry England (Redistricting) (Note: Danny Rampey was elected to succeed retiring Representative Terry England, but declined to be seated on January 3, 2023, after being arrested for stealing prescription narcotics. A special election was held on January 31, 2023, with a runoff on February 28, 2023, and it was won by Persinger.)

Personal details
- Party: Republican

Howard Holt Persinger III is an American politician from the Georgia Republican Party who serves as a member of the Georgia House of Representatives representing District 119. In 2023 he was elected to the Georgia House of Representatives in a special election to replace Danny Rampey who was elected in November 2022. Rampey withdrew prior to being seated, after being arrested for stealing prescription narcotics.
