= Karla Drenner =

American politician (born 1961)

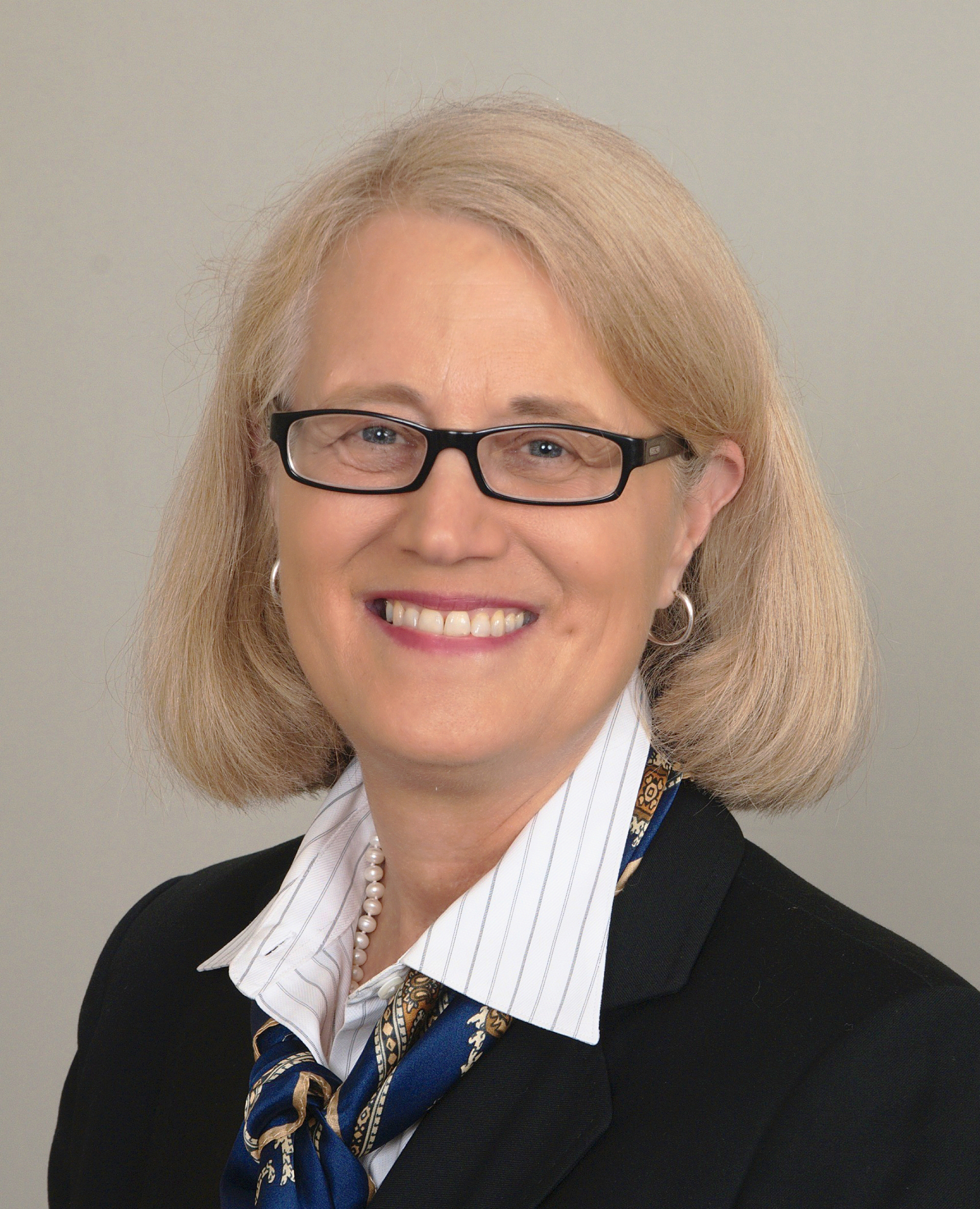

Member of the Georgia House of Representatives
- Incumbent
- Assumed office January 8, 2001
- Preceded by: June Hegstrom
- Constituency: 66th district (2001–2003); 57th district (2003–2005); 86th district (2005–2013); 85th district (2013–present)

Personal details
- Born: September 10, 1961 (age 64) Charleston, West Virginia, U.S.
- Party: Democratic

Karla Lea Drenner (born September 10, 1961) is an American academic and politician from Georgia. A Democrat, she is a member of the Georgia House of Representatives representing the state's 85th district in Avondale Estates, DeKalb County.

Drenner has four degrees from four different universities. She obtained a Bachelor of Science from West Virginia State College, an MBA from Fontbonne College, a Master of Science from Southern Illinois University and a PhD from La Salle University. In 2011, Drenner completed Harvard University's John F. Kennedy School of Government program for Senior Executives in State and Local Government as a David Bohnett LGBTQ Victory Institute Leadership Fellow.

Drenner is an adjunct Professor at DeVry University where she teaches Environmental Science, Principles of Ethics and Leadership and Motivation. Drenner is also the owner and President of an environmental safety and health consulting firm.

A lesbian, Drenner was the first ever openly gay member of the Georgia General Assembly. As of 2024, she is one of six LGBT members, alongside Democratic Representatives Park Cannon, Sam Park, Renitta Shannon, Keisha Waites, and Matthew Wilson. Her campaigns have won the backing of the Gay & Lesbian Victory Fund.

A resident of Avondale Estates, Drenner was first elected to the state house in 2000, defeating a four-term incumbent in what was then the 66th district. In this heavily Democratic district, the primary election was the key contest and she won it by just 68 votes — 52% to 48%. No Republican had filed for the seat so she won the general election unopposed. Due to redistricting, the seat was renumbered the 57th district in 2002 and the 85th in 2004 but she won re-election unopposed on both occasions.

The 85th district is 66% African American according to figures from the 2000 census. There have therefore been moves by some black leaders to replace Drenner with an African American. Indeed, in 2006, she faced an aggressive primary challenge from Cynthia Tucker, a black medical professor. Drenner survived, winning the primary by 62% to 38% and going on to win the general election unopposed. She faced no opposition in 2008 or 2010.
