= Buzz Brockway =

American politician

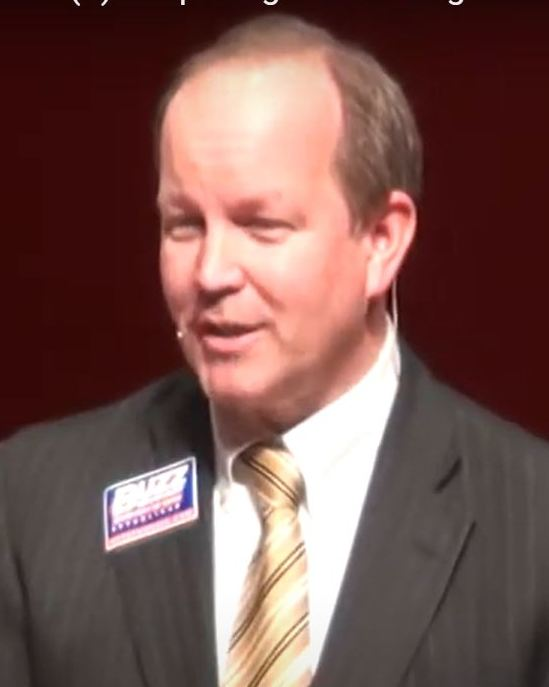
- Brockway in 2018

Member of the Georgia House of Representatives from the 102nd district
- In office January 14, 2013 – January 14, 2019
- Preceded by: B. J. Pak
- Succeeded by: Gregg Kennard

Member of the Georgia House of Representatives from the 101st district
- In office January 10, 2011 – January 14, 2013
- Preceded by: Mike Coan
- Succeeded by: Valerie Clark

Personal details
- Born: July 22, 1966 (age 60) Lawrenceville, Georgia, U.S.
- Party: Republican
- Spouse: Christa
- Children: 3
- Education: Georgia Institute of Technology

Buzz Brockway (born July 22, 1966) is an American politician. He previously served as a member of the Georgia House of Representatives from the 102nd District from 2013 until January 14, 2019. Brockway represented the 101st district from 2011 to 2013. He sponsored 277 bills. He is a member of the Republican Party.

In September 2018, Brockway joined the Georgia Center for Opportunity (GCO) as vice president of public policy. He will coordinate policy research and reform efforts aligned with GCO's mission to provide all Georgians with access to quality education, meaningful work, and healthy relationships.

On March 31, 2017, Brockway announced he would seek the office of Georgia Secretary of State following Brian Kemp's announcement he would leave the seat to run for governor. Brockway was eliminated after the primary election on May 22, 2018, when he received 15.37 percent of the vote. Because no candidate achieved over 50 percent of the vote, a runoff election for July 24, 2018, ensued between the top two vote getters. Brad Raffensperger and David Belle Isle advanced to this runoff election, where Raffensperger defeated Belle Isle with 61.74 percent of the vote. Raffensperger won the general election with 51.9 percent of the vote against Democrat John Barrow after another runoff election on December 4, 2018.

Georgia House of Representatives
Preceded by Mike Coan	Member of the Georgia House of Representatives from the 101st district 2011–2013	Succeeded by Valerie Clark
Preceded by B. J. Pak	Member of the Georgia House of Representatives from the 102nd district 2013–2019	Succeeded by Gregg Kennard
