= Georgia's 42nd House of Representatives district =

State district in Georgia, USA

Georgia's 42nd State House of Representatives district
Representative
Gabriel Sanchez; D–Smyrna
- Demographics: 28.9% White; 24.4% Black; 39.8% Hispanic; 4.0% Asian
- Population: 58,990

District 42 elects one member of the Georgia House of Representatives. It contains parts of Cobb County including the cities of Austell and Mableton.

== Members ==
- Stacey Evans (2011–2017)
- Teri Anulewicz (2017–2025)
- Gabriel Sanchez (since 2025)
