= Teri Anulewicz =

American politician (born 1976)

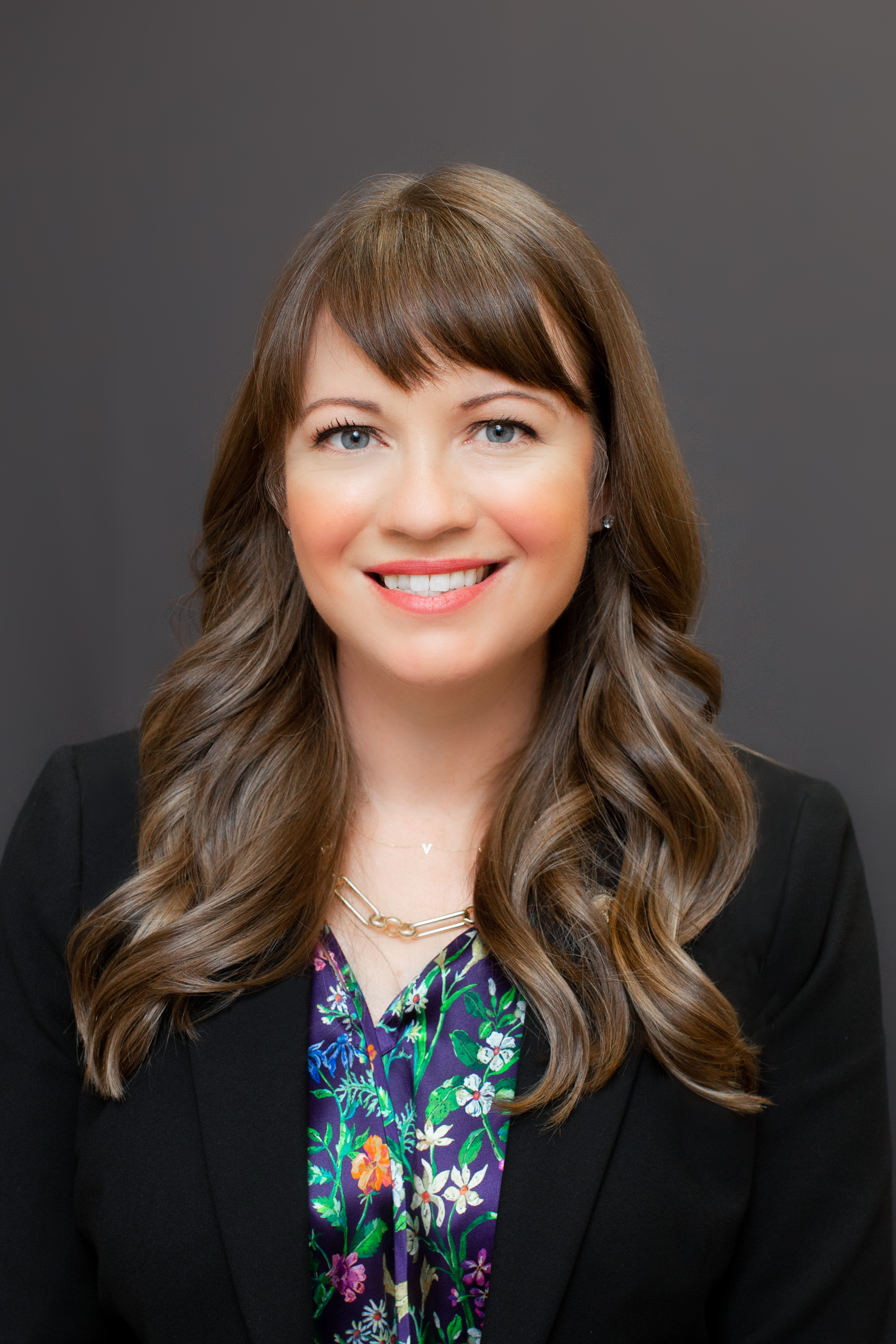

Member of the Georgia House of Representatives from the 42nd district
- In office November 27, 2017 – January 13, 2025
- Preceded by: Stacey Evans
- Succeeded by: Gabriel Sanchez

Personal details
- Born: August 18, 1976 (age 50) New Orleans, Louisiana, U.S.
- Party: Democratic
- Spouse: Chris Anulewicz
- Children: 2
- Education: Agnes Scott College

Theresa Lippincott Anulewicz (/əˈnʌləwɪts/ ə-NUL-ə-wits; born August 18, 1976) is an American politician. Anulewicz was the Georgia State Representative from District 42.

Anulewicz lost re-nomination to Gabriel Sanchez in 2024.
