= Mike Coan =

American politician

Mike Coan is an American politician from the state of Georgia. He is a former member of the Georgia House of Representatives.

Coan graduated from South Gwinnett High School. He was elected to the Georgia House in 1996, after defeating incumbent Vinson Wall, and resigned in 2010 after Governor Sonny Perdue named him the administrator of the Subsequent Injury Trust Fund. In 2022, Coan ran for the Republican nomination for Georgia Labor Commissioner. He lost the primary election to Bruce Thompson.

Georgia House of Representatives
Preceded by Vinson Wall	Member of the Georgia House of Representatives from the 82nd district 1997–2003	Succeeded by Gail Buckner
Preceded by Stephanie Stuckey	Member of the Georgia House of Representatives from the 67th district, Post 1; 2003–2005	Succeeded by Bill Hembree
Preceded by Bob Lane	Member of the Georgia House of Representatives from the 101st district 2005–2010	Succeeded by Buzz Brockway
