= Georgia's 108th House of Representatives district =

American legislative district

Georgia's 108th State House of Representatives district
Representative
Jasmine Clark; D–Tucker

Georgia's 108th House district elects one member of the Georgia House of Representatives. Its current representative is Democrat Jasmine Clark.

The district includes the Atlanta suburbs of Lilburn and Mountain Park.

== Elected representatives ==
Representative	Party	Years of service	Hometown	Notes
Robert Ray	Democrat	2003-2005		
Terry England	Republican	2005–2013	Auburn	
B. J. Pak	Republican	2013–2017	Lilburn	
Clay Cox	Republican	2017–2019	Lilburn	
Jasmine Clark	Democrat	2019–present	Lilburn	
