= John A. Horn =

American lawyer

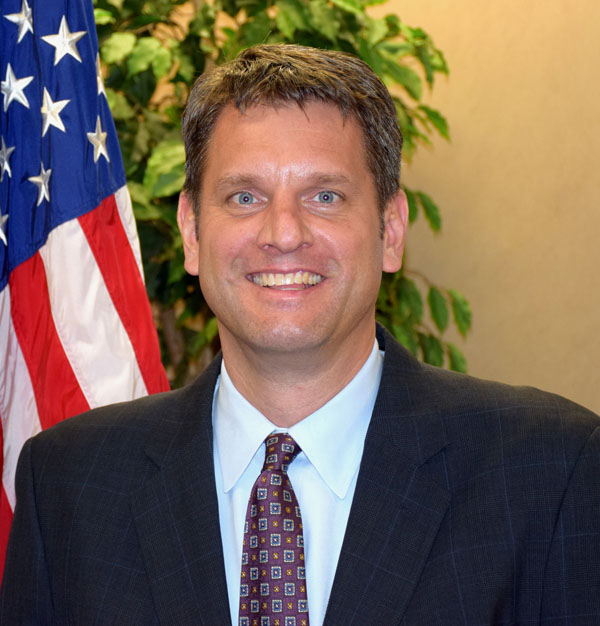

United States Attorney for the Northern District of Georgia
- In office January 2015 – October 2017
- President: Barack Obama; Donald Trump
- Preceded by: Sally Yates
- Succeeded by: B. J. Pak

Personal details
- Born: John Andrew Horn; September 7, 1968 (age 57)
- Education: College of William & Mary (BA); University of Virginia (JD)

John Andrew Horn (born September 7, 1968) is an American attorney. Currently with the law firm King & Spalding, he is a former United States Attorney for the Northern District of Georgia.

== Education and legal career ==
Prior to joining the U.S. Attorney's Office in 2002, Horn was an associate in the special matters group at King & Spalding. Before that, Horn clerked for Judge Harold L. Murphy of the Northern District of Georgia, and for Stanley F. Birch, Jr. of the Eleventh Circuit Court of Appeals. He obtained his undergraduate degree at William and Mary, and his J.D. in 1996 from the University of Virginia School of Law.

== United States Attorney ==
During his 15-year tenure with the U.S. Attorney's Office in Atlanta, Horn served as deputy chief of the Narcotics & Organized Crime Drug Enforcement Task Force, then Appellate Division chief and first assistant U.S. attorney under Sally Yates. Horn became acting U.S. attorney after then-President Barack Obama nominated Yates as Deputy Attorney General. When Horn's term expired in December 2015, the judges of the Northern District of Georgia issued a court order officially naming him as U.S. Attorney for the district. The court order bypassed the Senate confirmation process, allowing Horn to serve as U.S. Attorney until the President nominated, and the Senate confirmed, his successor.
