= Georgia's 102nd House of Representatives district =

American legislative district

Georgia's 102nd State House of Representatives district
Representative
Gabe Okoye; D–Lawrenceville

Georgia's 102nd House district elects one member of the Georgia House of Representatives. Its current representative is Democrat Gabe Okoye.

== Elected representatives ==
Representative	Party	Years of service	Hometown	Notes
Clay Cox	Republican	January 10, 2005 – January 10, 2011		
B. J. Pak	Republican	January 10, 2011 - January 14, 2013		
Buzz Brockway	Republican	January 14, 2013 – January 14, 2019	Lawrenceville	
Gregg Kennard	Democrat	January 14, 2019 – January 13, 2025	Lawrenceville	
Gabe Okoye	Democrat	January 9, 2023 – present	Lawrenceville	
