= Danny Rampey =

American politician

Member of the Georgia House of Representatives from the 119th district
- Declined to be seated
- Preceded by: Terry England (Redistricting)
- Succeeded by: Holt Persinger

Personal details
- Party: Republican

Danny Rampey is an American politician from the Georgia Republican Party who was elected to the Georgia House of Representatives for District 119, succeeding retiring Representative Terry England. Prior taking office, Rampey was arrested for stealing prescription narcotics, leading to him declining to take his seat, which was later filled in a special election by Holt Persinger.
