= Mike Keown =

American politician

Member of the Georgia House of Representatives from the 173rd district
- In office 2004–2010
- Succeeded by: Darlene K. Taylor

Personal details
- Born: May 11, 1954 (age 72) Canton, Georgia, U.S.
- Party: Republican
- Spouse: Kathy
- Children: Two
- Education: Shorter University, Southwestern Baptist Theological Seminary, New Orleans Baptist Theological Seminary
- Profession: Pastor, prison chaplain

Michael Huel Keown (born May 11, 1954) is an American and a Republican former member of the Georgia House of Representatives from District 173, first elected in 2004. In 2010, he did not seek reelection and was the Republican nominee in the 2010 U.S. House of Representatives elections, 2nd District. Keown was defeated by incumbent Democrat Sanford Bishop in a close election.

Keown campaigned for the Republican nomination for Georgia State Senate, District 11 in a special election in 2013 following the resignation of John Bulloch. He was one of the top two vote-getters in the January 2013 election, but lost in the February 2013 run-off to Dean Burke.
