= Georgia's 101st House of Representatives district =

American legislative district

Georgia's 101st State House of Representatives district
Representative
Scott Holcomb; D–Atlanta

Georgia's 101st House of Representatives district elects one member of the Georgia House of Representatives. Its current representative is Democrat Scott Holcomb.

== Elected representatives ==
Representative	Party	Years of service	Hometown	Notes
Valerie Clark	Republican	2011–2013	???	
Sam Park	Democrat	2016–2023	Lawrenceville	
Gregg Kennard	Democrat	2023–2025		
Scott Holcomb	Democrat	2025–present		
