= Georgia's 116th House of Representatives district =

State district in Georgia, USA

Georgia's 116th State House of Representatives district
Representative
El-Mahdi Holly; D–Stockbridge
- Demographics: 74.1% White; 10.6% Black; 10.0% Hispanic; 3.3% Asian
- Population: 57,569

District 116 elects one member of the Georgia House of Representatives. It contains parts of DeKalb County and Henry County.

== Members ==
- Terry England (2013–2023)
- El-Mahdi Holly (since 2022)
