= Georgia's 19th House of Representatives district =

State district in Georgia, USA

Georgia's 19th State House of Representatives district
Representative
Joseph Gullett; R–Dallas
- Demographics: 74.3% White; 18.3% Black; 4.5% Hispanic; 0.9% Asian
- Population: 56,649

District 19 elects one member of the Georgia House of Representatives. It contains parts of Cobb County and Paulding County.

== Members ==
- Daniel Stout (until 2011)
- Paulette Rakestraw (2011–2019)
- Joseph Gullett (since 2019)
