= Reynaldo Martinez =

American politician

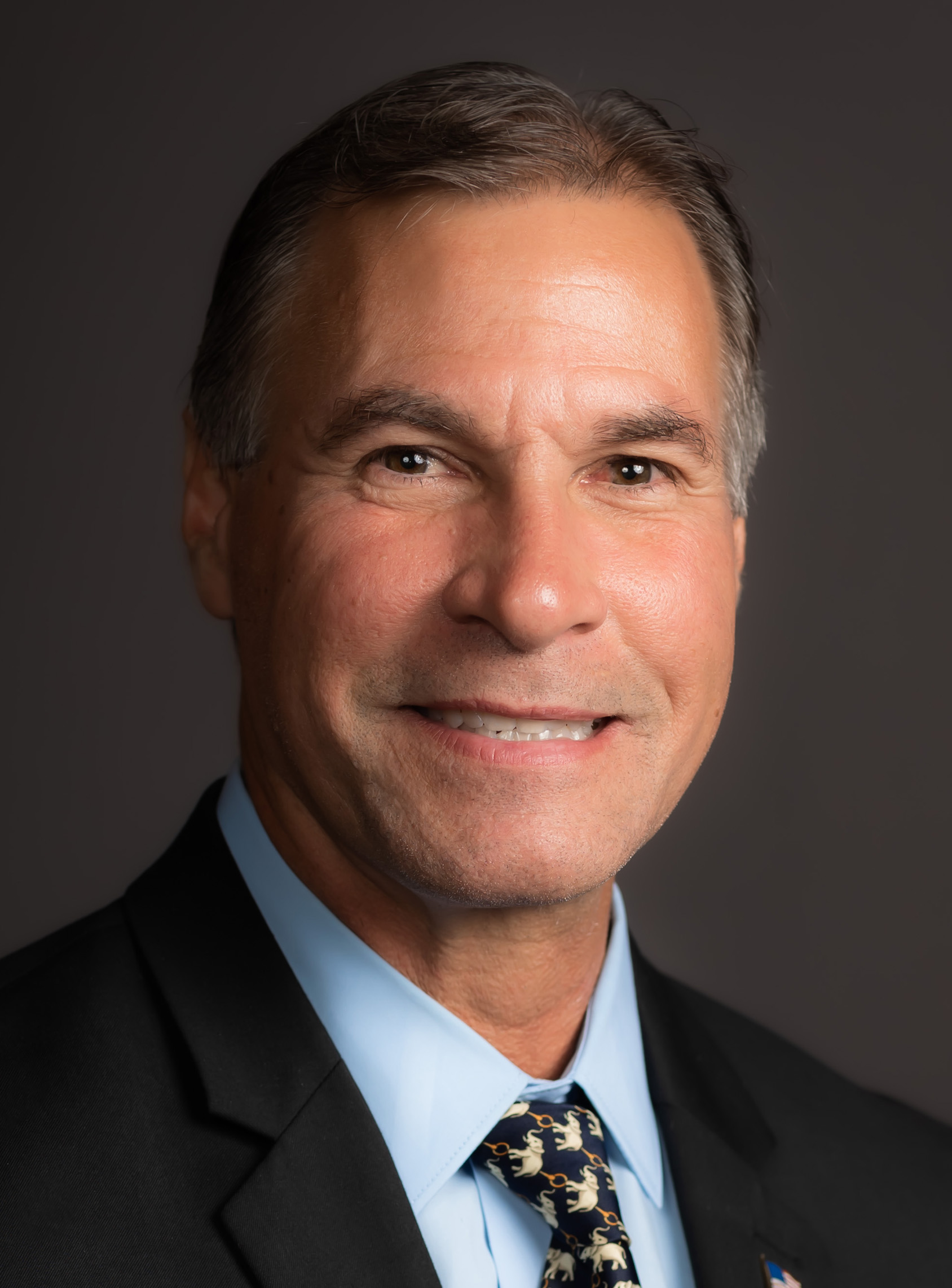
- Official headshot

Member of the Georgia House of Representatives from the 111th district
- Incumbent
- Assumed office January 31, 2023
- Preceded by: El-Mahdi Holly (redistricting)

Personal details
- Party: Republican
- Spouse: Ana Maria

Reynaldo "Rey" Martinez is an American politician from the Georgia Republican Party who serves as a member of the Georgia House of Representatives representing District 111.

== Personal life ==
Martinez lives in Loganville, Georgia. He is married to Ana Maria.
