= Darlene Taylor (politician) =

American politician from Georgia

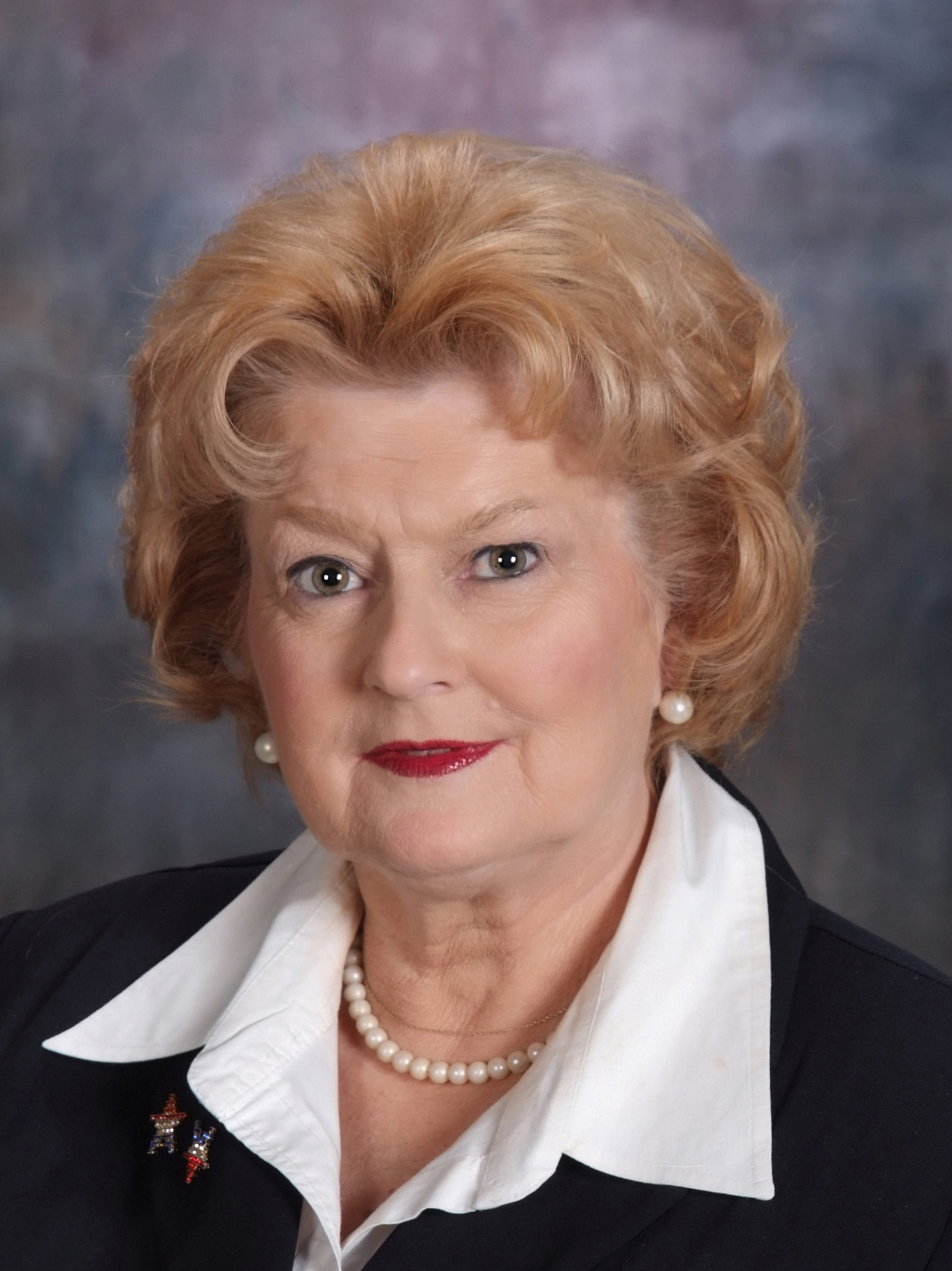
- Official headshot

Member of the Georgia House of Representatives from the 173rd district
- Incumbent
- Assumed office January 10, 2011
- Preceded by: Mike Keown

Personal details
- Born: January 29, 1950 (age 76) Thomasville, Georgia, U.S.
- Party: Republican

Darlene Kaye Taylor (born January 29, 1950) is an American politician. She is a member of the Georgia House of Representatives from the 173rd District, serving since 2008. She is a member of the Republican party.
