= Terry England =

American politician from Georgia

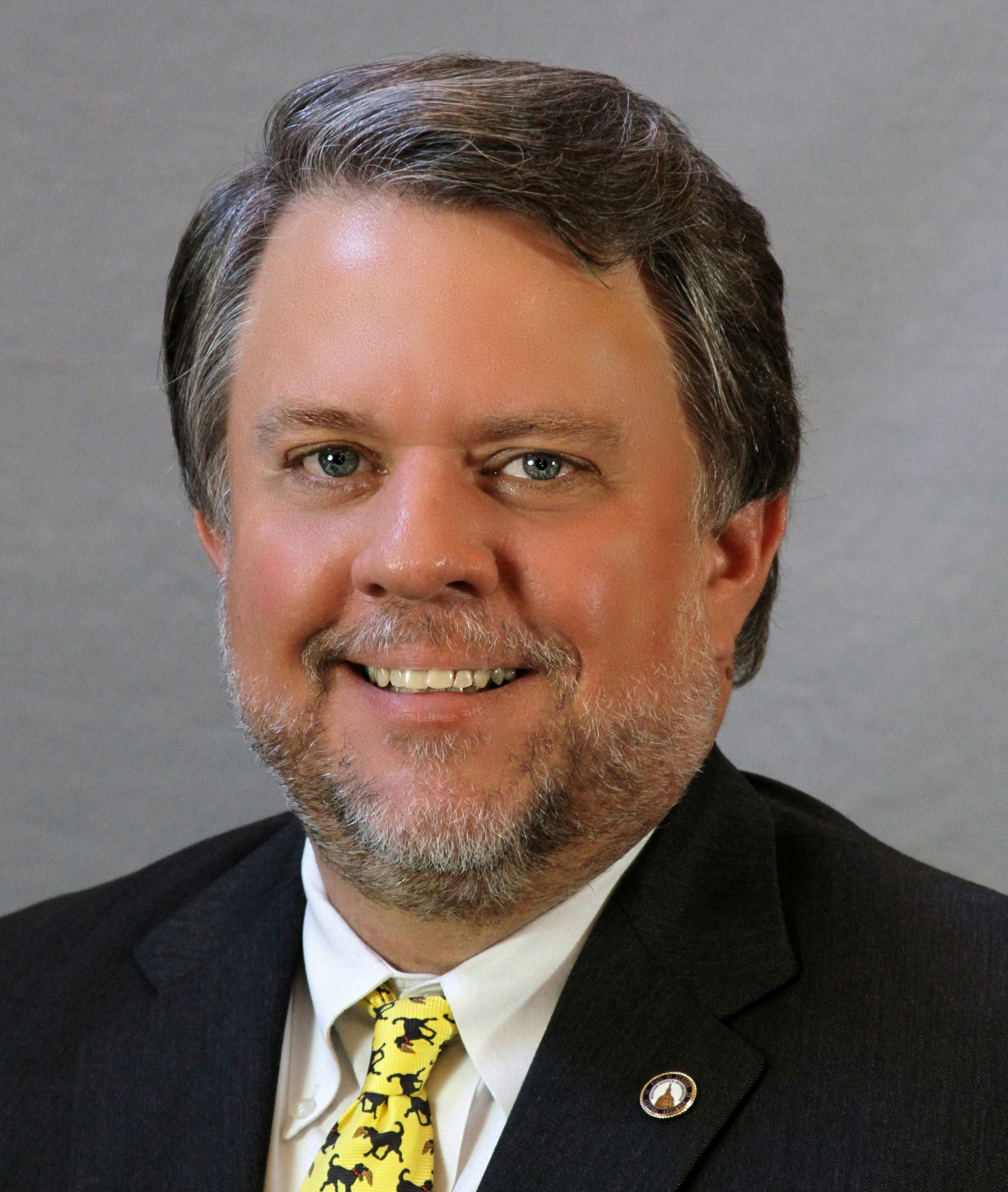

Member of the Georgia House of Representatives
- In office January 10, 2005 – January 9, 2023
- Preceded by: Robert Ray
- Succeeded by: Holt Persinger (Redistricting) (Note: Danny Rampey was elected to succeed England, but declined to be seated on January 3, 2023, after being arrested for stealing prescription narcotics. A special election was held on January 31, 2023, with a runoff on February 28, 2023, and was won by Holt Persinger, who assumed the office on March 6.)
- Constituency: 108th District (2005–2013); 116th District (2013–2023)

Personal details
- Born: August 10, 1966 (age 59)
- Party: Republican

Terry Lamar England (born August 10, 1966) is an American politician from Georgia. England served as a Republican member of the Georgia House of Representatives from 2005 to 2023. He has sponsored 411 bills.

== Notes ==
Georgia House of Representatives
Preceded by Robert Ray	Member of the Georgia House of Representatives from the 108th district 2005–2013	Succeeded by B. J. Pak
Preceded by Mickey Channell	Member of the Georgia House of Representatives from the 116th district 2013–2023	Succeeded by El-Mahdi Holly
