= Clay Cox =

American businessman and politician from Georgia

Member of the Georgia House of Representatives from the 102nd district
- In office January 10, 2005 – January 10, 2011
- Preceded by: Butch Parrish
- Succeeded by: B. J. Pak

Member of the Georgia House of Representatives from the 108th district
- In office January 9, 2017 – January 14, 2019
- Preceded by: B. J. Pak
- Succeeded by: Jasmine Clark

Personal details
- Born: Lilburn, Georgia, U.S.
- Party: Republican
- Occupation: Businessman, politician

Clay Cox is an American businessman and politician from Georgia. Cox is a Republican Party member of Georgia House of Representatives from the 108th District, serving from 9 January 2017 until 14 January 2019.

== Education ==
Cox earned a Bachelor of Science degree in Criminal Justice from Western Carolina University.

== Career ==
In 1992, as a businessman, Cox became a Founder and Chief Executive Officer of Professional Probation Services Incorporated.

On November 2, 2004, Cox won the election and became a Republican member of Georgia House of Representatives for District 102. Cox defeated Carl Bergman with 69.06% of the votes. Cox unsuccessfully ran for the United States House of Representatives in Georgia's 7th congressional district in 2010, losing to the Democratic nominee David Scott.

On November 8, 2016, Cox won the election and became a Republican member of Georgia House of Representatives for District 108. Cox defeated Tokhir "T.K." Radjabov with 52.65% of the votes. On November 6, 2018, Cox lost the election. Cox was defeated by Jasmine Clark by a few hundred votes. Cox received only 49.32% of the votes.

== Personal life ==
Cox's wife is Alisa Cox. They have two children. Cox and his family live in Lilburn, Georgia.
