= BJay Pak =

Korean-American attorney and politician (born 1974)

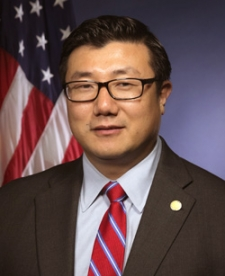
- Official portrait 2017

United States Attorney for the Northern District of Georgia
- In office October 10, 2017 – January 4, 2021
- President: Donald Trump
- Preceded by: John A. Horn
- Succeeded by: Bobby Christine (Acting)

Member of the Georgia House of Representatives
- In office January 10, 2011 – January 9, 2017
- Preceded by: Clay Cox (102nd); Terry England (108th)
- Succeeded by: Buzz Brockway (102nd); Clay Cox (108th)
- Constituency: 102nd district (2011–2013); 108th district (2013–2017)

Personal details
- Born: Byung Jin Pak; 1974 (age 51–52) Seoul, South Korea
- Party: Republican
- Spouse: Sandra
- Children: 3
- Education: Stetson University (BS); University of Illinois, Urbana-Champaign (JD)

Byung Jin "BJay" Pak (born 1974) is a Korean-American attorney and politician who served as the United States attorney for the United States District Court for the Northern District of Georgia from 2017 to 2021. Pak previously served as a member of the Georgia House of Representatives as a Republican from 2011 to 2017.

== Early life and education ==
Pak was born in Seoul, South Korea. His family emigrated to United States, residing in Apopka, Florida, when he was 9 years old. Pak is a graduate of Stetson University, where he earned a Bachelor of Science degree in accounting. He earned his Juris Doctor, summa cum laude and Order of the Coif, from the University of Illinois College of Law. In law school, Pak was a Harno Scholar, served as the notes editor for the recent decisions section of the Illinois Bar Journal, and was a member of the Elder Law Journal. In 2013, he was named Distinguished Alumnus of the Year by the University of Illinois College of Law.

== Career ==
After graduation, he clerked for Richard Mills of the United States District Court for the Central District of Illinois.

Pak served in the Georgia House of Representatives as a Republican from 2011 to 2017. After representing the 102nd District from 2011 to 2013 and the 108th District from 2013 to 2017, Pak opted not to run for re-election in the November 2016 election. Pak was previously a federal prosecutor. While serving as an Assistant United States Attorney, he led the prosecution of individuals who tried to steal Coca-Cola's trade secrets in order to sell them to Pepsi. Pak is Georgia's first Asian-American U.S. Attorney, and he was the state's first Korean-American legislator.

=== United States Attorney ===
In July 2017, Pak was nominated by President Donald Trump to become United States attorney for the Northern District of Georgia. He was confirmed for the position by the United States Senate on September 28, 2017.

On January 3, 2021, Trump called top Georgia state election officials, a call which was recorded and later released, and pressured them to help him "find" more votes in order to overturn the election of president-elect Biden. During the call, Trump referenced Atlanta and Fulton counties of Georgia and referred to the "never-Trumper U.S. attorney there." Pak's district included those counties. Pak resigned the next day, citing "unforeseen circumstances."

=== Resignation ===
Pak resigned unexpectedly on January 4, 2021. Justice Department officials have declined to say whether Pak resigned voluntarily or was asked to do so. However, The Wall Street Journal reported that Pak was forced to resign by senior White House officials in the Trump administration for not investigating false claims of election fraud "enough." Trump immediately replaced Pak with Bobby Christine, the Trump-appointed U.S. attorney from southern Georgia, bypassing top career prosecutor Kurt Erskine. Christine also found no evidence of election fraud. The Justice Department inspector general opened an inquiry into Pak's departure. Pak told the Senate Judiciary Committee in August 2021 that top Justice Department officials had told him on January 3 that he would be fired by Trump if he did not say there had been widespread voter fraud in Georgia; resigning would pre-empt a public dismissal.

Pak has since returned to private practice.

Georgia House of Representatives
Preceded by Clay Cox	Member of the Georgia House of Representatives from the 102nd district 2011–2013	Succeeded by Buzz Brockway
Preceded by Terry England	Member of the Georgia House of Representatives from the 108th district 2013–2017	Succeeded by Clay Cox
Legal offices
Preceded by John A. Horn	United States Attorney for the Northern District of Georgia; 2017–2021	Succeeded by Bobby Christine; Acting
