= Valerie Clark =

American politician

Member of the Georgia House of Representatives from the 101st district
- In office 2013–2017
- Preceded by: Buzz Brockway
- Succeeded by: Sam Park

Member of the Georgia House of Representatives from the 104th district
- In office 2011–2013
- Preceded by: John Heard
- Succeeded by: Donna Sheldon

Personal details
- Born: New York, US
- Party: Republican

Valerie Clark is an American politician. She was a member of the Georgia House of Representatives from the 101st District, serving from 2013 to 2017. Clark represented the 104th district from 2011 to 2013. She is a member of the Republican party.
