= Scott Holcomb =

American politician (born 1972)

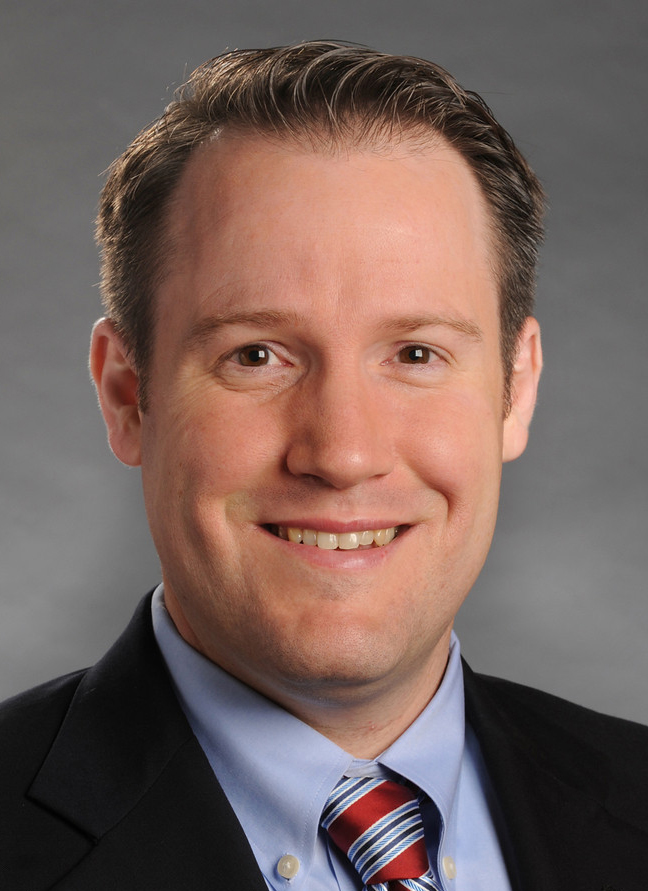

Member of the Georgia House of Representatives
- Incumbent
- Assumed office January 10, 2011
- Preceded by: Kevin Levitas
- Constituency: 82nd district (2011–2013); 81st district (2013–2025); 101st district (2025–present)

Personal details
- Born: Michael Scott Holcomb; November 2, 1972 (age 54) New Haven, Connecticut, U.S.
- Party: Democratic
- Spouse: Kathleen Oh
- Education: University of Connecticut; West Virginia University; University of Georgia; UNC Chapel Hill; University of Michigan
- Website: Campaign website

Military service
- Branch: United States Army
- Service years: 1998–2004
- Rank: Captain
- Unit: J.A.G. Corps
- Conflicts: War in Afghanistan; Iraq War

Michael Scott Holcomb (born November 2, 1972) is an American politician, attorney, and Army veteran. A member of the Democratic Party, he represents District 101 in the Georgia House of Representatives, which includes portions of DeKalb and Gwinnett counties.

== Education and law career ==
Holcomb earned a Bachelor of Arts degree from the University of Connecticut, a J.D. from West Virginia University, an MBA from the University of Georgia, and a MPA from the University of North Carolina at Chapel Hill. He also studied Public Health at the University of Michigan.

In 2004, Holcomb was selected for the prestigious Marshall Memorial Fellowship from the German Marshall Fund of the United States. As an American Marshall Memorial Fellow, he traveled throughout the European Union meeting with Members of the European Parliament, Ambassadors from throughout Europe and Member State National Leaders, forming a broader perspective on foreign policy and bilateral relations between United States and the EU.

=== Military service ===
Holcomb served in the Army JAG Corps, serving as a labor counselor, military prosecutor, and international law attorney. He reached the rank of captain. He deployed overseas for Bosnia, Afghanistan, and Iraq. He wrote about his experiences in an article that was published by the Chicago Journal of International Law. He also co-authored an article about the need to update the laws of war in the Christian Science Monitor.

=== Law career ===
Holcomb previously worked at Sutherland Asbill & Brennan LLP, and is now at Holcomb + Ward, LLP, with a practice that includes securities litigation and enforcement. He also represents veterans and their family members on a pro bono basis.

== Political career ==
=== Run for statewide office ===
In 2006, Holcomb unsuccessfully sought the Democratic Party's nomination for Georgia Secretary of State.

=== Georgia House of Representatives, 2011–present ===
In 2010, Holcomb ran unopposed as a Democrat for a Georgia House of Representatives seat that was unexpectedly vacated by the incumbent who announced his retirement a few days after qualifying to run for reelection. Holcomb was reelected in 2012 following a redistricting that combined his district with that of another Democrat (Elena Parent) and that made the district—Georgia House District 81—a majority Republican district. He has since retained the seat for 3 terms, and is currently serving a 4th term after winning the 2016 election. Holcomb served as Chief Deputy Whip of the House Democratic Caucus. He serves as a member on the Judiciary, Defense & Veterans Affairs, Higher Education, Juvenile Justice, and Public Safety and Homeland Security committees.

==== Legislation ====
In 2016, Holcomb sponsored a bipartisan bill to enforce the collection, testing and reporting of medical kits for victims of sexual assault, in spite of strong opposition by Georgia State Senator Renee Unterman, (who eventually voted for the bill). His bipartisan efforts, which included collaborating with Republican Speaker David Ralston and Democratic Senator Elena Parent, were featured on the news satire television program Full Frontal with Samantha Bee. Holcomb supports juvenile justice reform, deepening the Port of Savannah, and encouraging more students to graduate from high school and college. He was the driving force behind legislation in 2018 that helped victims of domestic violence break their leases without an early termination penalty. In 2019, he passed legislation to extend the length of time that Georgia would preserve evidence in cases involving sexual assault. He has played a role in the national response to addressing the backlog of untested sexual assault kits. In 2020, Holcomb passed legislation authorizing benefit corporations in Georgia.

Holcomb is considered a rising star in the Georgia Democratic Party and is often mentioned as a possible candidate for statewide or federal office in the not too distant future.

== Personal life ==
Holcomb is married to Kathleen Oh, with whom he has two children. He enjoys running marathons and completed Iron Man Florida. He was named one of Georgia's Top 40 Under 40 by Georgia Trend Magazine, and is a member of the Council on Foreign Relations and the Truman National Security Project. He has also been affiliated with HOPE Atlanta, the Georgia Perimeter College Foundation, and the Georgia Asylum and Immigration Network. Holcomb has taught at the Sam Nunn School of International Affairs at Georgia Tech, and has appeared on CNN, NPR, and BBC.
