= Sam Park =

American politician (born 1985)

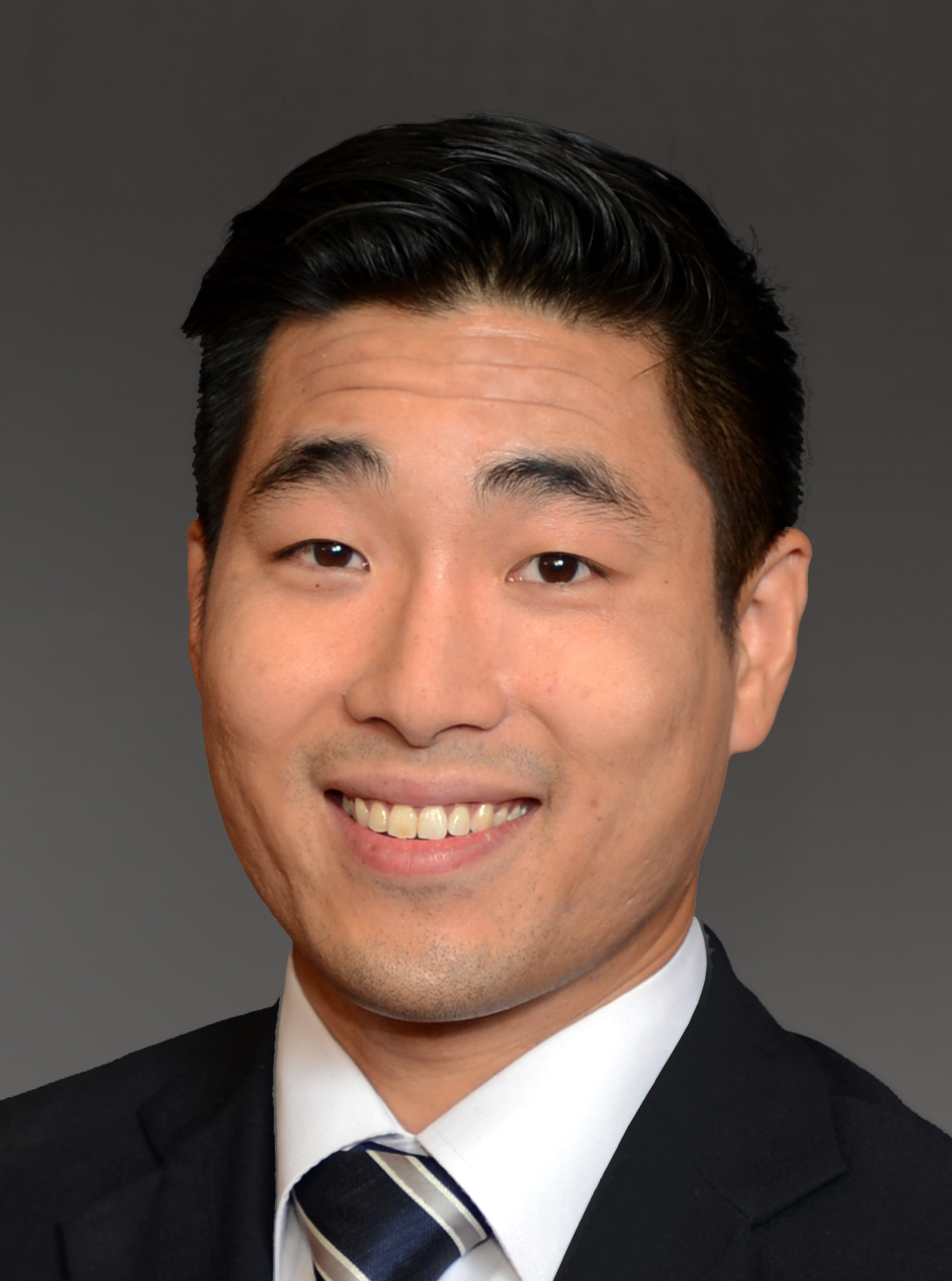
- Official portrait, 2017

Member of the Georgia House of Representatives
- Incumbent
- Assumed office January 9, 2017
- Preceded by: Valerie Clark
- Constituency: 101st District (2017–2023); 107th District (2023–Present)

Personal details
- Born: Samuel Lauderdale Park; October 1, 1985 (age 40) Atlanta, Georgia, U.S.
- Party: Democratic
- Education: Georgia State University (BA, BS, JD); American University (LLM)

Samuel Lauderdale Park (born October 1, 1985) is an American politician and lawyer who was first elected to the Georgia House of Representatives in 2016. A member of the Democratic Party, he represents the 107th district.

== Early life and education ==
Born and raised in Georgia, Sam Park is the grandson of refugees from the Korean War, and the son of Korean American immigrants. Through the HOPE Scholarship, Park attended Georgia State University where he obtained a B.A. in political science and a B.S. in economics. He went on to earn his J.D. degree from Georgia State University College of Law and his LL.M. from American University Washington College of Law.

== Early political career ==
During his second year of law school, Park took a Health, Legislation, and Advocacy course where he drafted a bill to provide skilled nursing services to medically fragile children. This was his first opportunity to work in the Georgia General Assembly. During the 2012 legislative session he met and interned for Stacey Abrams who was the minority leader of the Georgia House Democratic Caucus at that time. He served as a legal extern for the Georgia Senate Democratic Caucus during the 2013 legislative session. He then worked as a legal aide for Maryland State Senator Jamie Raskin. He also worked on Jason Carter's 2014 gubernatorial campaign and Jon Ossoff's 2017 campaign.

== Georgia House of Representatives ==
Park was inspired to run for political office after his mother was diagnosed with terminal cancer and was able to receive treatment through public health insurance, Medicare, and Medicaid. Park won the 101st district with 51.1% of the vote despite his opponent, incumbent Republican Chairwoman Valerie Clark, being favored during the campaign.

Park is the first openly gay man to be elected to the state legislature in Georgia and the first Asian American Democrat ever elected to the Georgia General Assembly. In 2017, Park was appointed to serve as a Deputy Whip of the Georgia House Democratic Caucus.

In 2018, Park was re-elected with 58.81% of the vote, and was selected to serve as the vice-chair of the Gwinnett State House Delegation.

== National politics ==
Park was selected as one of seventeen speakers to jointly deliver the keynote address at the 2020 Democratic National Convention. Park was the first Korean-American to be part of a national party convention keynote address, and he, Malcolm Kenyatta, and Robert Garcia were the first openly gay speakers in a keynote slot at a Democratic National Convention.

Georgia House of Representatives
Preceded by Valerie Clark	Member of the Georgia House of Representatives from the 101st district 2017–2023	Succeeded by Gregg Kennard
Preceded by Shelly Hutchinson	Member of the Georgia House of Representatives from the 107th district 2023–Present	Incumbent
Party political offices
Preceded by Elizabeth Warren	Keynote Speaker of the Democratic National Convention; 2020; Served alongside: Stacey Abrams, Raumesh Akbari, Colin Allred, Brendan Boyle, Yvanna Cancela, Kathleen Clyde, Nikki Fried, Robert Garcia, Malcolm Kenyatta, Marlon Kimpson, Conor Lamb, Mari Manoogian, Victoria Neave, Jonathan Nez, Denny Ruprecht, Randall Woodfin	Succeeded by Angela Alsobrooks
