= Stacey Evans =

American politician (born 1978)

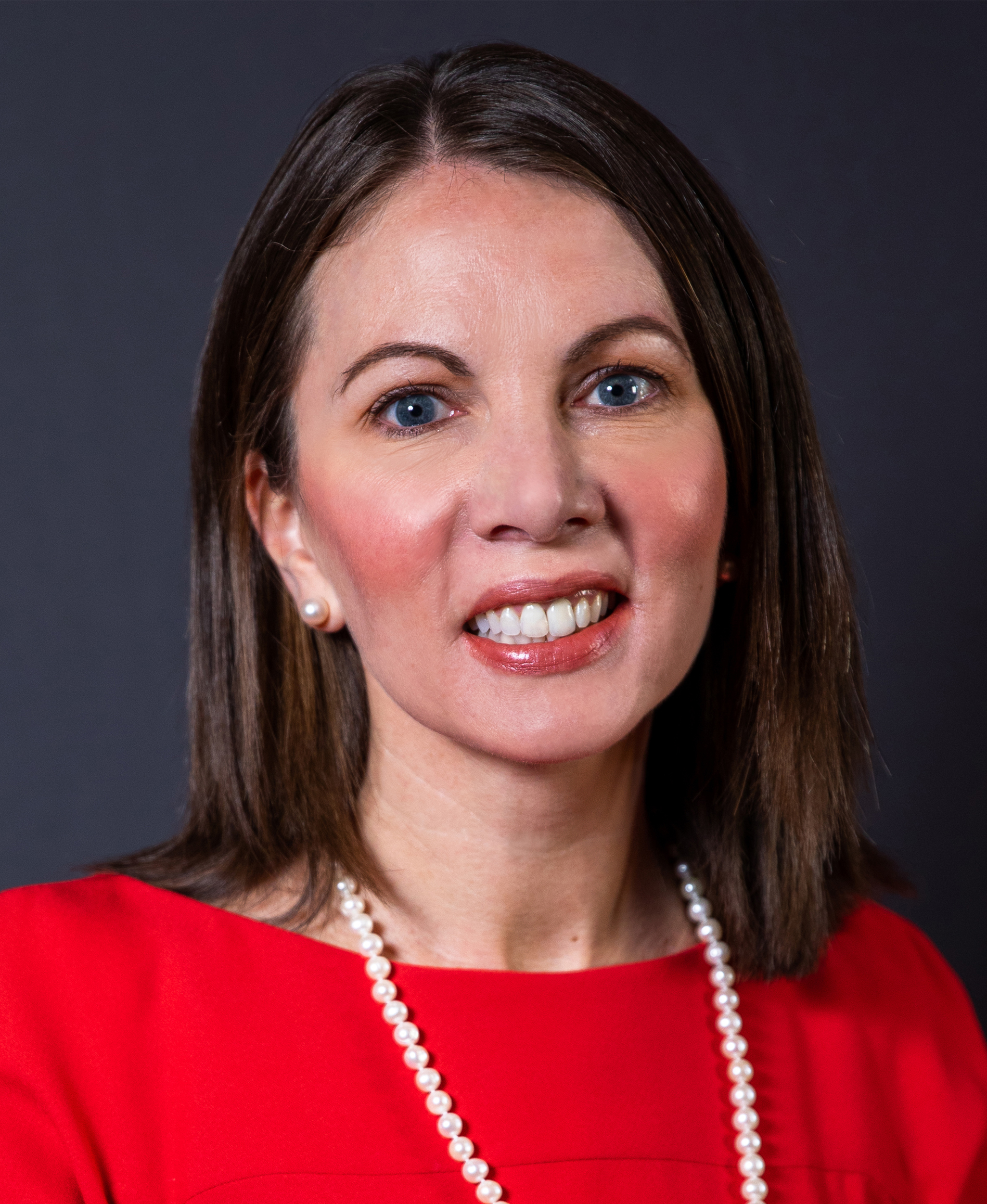

Member of the Georgia House of Representatives
- Incumbent
- Assumed office January 11, 2021
- Preceded by: Pat Gardner
- Constituency: 57th district
- In office January 10, 2011 – September 5, 2017
- Preceded by: Rob Teilhet
- Succeeded by: Teri Anulewicz
- Constituency: 42nd district

Personal details
- Born: May 5, 1978 (age 48) Ringgold, Georgia, U.S.
- Party: Democratic
- Spouse: Andrew Evans
- Children: 2
- Education: University of Georgia (BA, JD)
- Website: Official website

Stacey Godfrey Evans (born May 5, 1978) is an American attorney and member of the Georgia House of Representatives representing District 57 starting in 2021. She received 56.8% of the primary vote, and was uncontested in the general election. A member of the Democratic Party, she was the Georgia State Representative for District 42 from 2011 to 2014. She was succeeded by Teri Anulewicz.

Evans was reelected three times in District 42, most recently receiving 73.25% of the vote in 2016. She resigned her legislative seat to focus on her bid for the 2018 Georgia gubernatorial election; she finished second in the Democratic primary. In addition to serving in the legislature, Evans also founded her own law firm, S.G. Evans Law, LLC.

== Georgia General Assembly, 2011–2017 ==
Evans has received numerous awards for her legislative advocacy, including two Arnie awards, the "Super Woman Award" in 2012; and the "Teach Your Children and Colleagues Award" in 2013.

Representative Evans opposed the 20-week abortion ban during the 2012 legislative session. She was 9 months pregnant during the vote, which was scheduled for the day she was to be induced into labor. She spoke out against the bill in a video statement played on the House floor hours before she gave birth. This was one of the first times that a video statement was allowed on the Georgia House floor.

She served on the Judiciary Committee in the Georgia House. In 2015, Evans helped stop Josh McKoon's religious liberty bill from becoming law. She fought to include civil rights protections in the bill and then joined with the majority of her colleagues on the House Judiciary committee in voting to table the legislation. She was commended for her work by Georgia Equality.

== Work on HOPE Scholarship ==
In the legislature, she quickly became known as a fighter for HOPE. She opposed the changes pushed by Governor Nathan Deal and Georgia legislative leaders that, Evans claimed, would push many Georgians off of the scholarship and out of school.

The HOPE Scholarship program began by promising that all those who graduated from Georgia high schools with a B average would be able to go to college with the cost paid for by taxpayers.

Despite the opposition of Evans, a proposal was made to limit the full scholarship only to those who achieved a 3.7 GPA and 1200 on the SAT. Evans responded by claiming that this would prevent many of the students who most needed the help from attending college at all and said in remarks to the House chamber that had these limitations been in place when she graduated from college she wouldn't be standing there that day.

In the end, the proposal to limit the scholarship was successful.

== 2018 Georgia gubernatorial race ==
Representative Evans ran for governor of Georgia in the 2018 Democratic primary election. She lost in the primary election to former state representative and House Minority Leader Stacey Abrams.

== Campaign Finance and Donor Record ==
According to Georgia Ethics Commission public records, Evans has raised approximately $4.8 million across her political career. Her largest donor category by occupation is attorneys and law firms, accounting for over $1 million in contributions across more than 1,700 individual donations. Evans has also self-funded more than $2 million of her own campaigns. Notable donors include L. Lin Wood, a Georgia attorney who became a prominent 2020 election conspiracy theorist, who contributed $20,150 to Evans across multiple campaign cycles. The American Federation for Children, the primary political vehicle of former U.S. Secretary of Education Betsy DeVos, also contributed to her campaigns.

== Sports Betting PAC Spending ==
In May 2026, American Future, a political action committee funded by DK Crown Holdings, a wholly owned subsidiary of DraftKings, spent $143,331 in independent expenditures supporting Evans's re-election campaign in House District 57. The expenditures, disclosed in a Georgia Ethics Commission filing dated May 5, 2026, included $127,370 in digital advertising and $15,961 in direct mail, both executed through the political consulting firm SKDKnickerbocker.

The Atlanta Civic Circle reported that the sports betting industry emerged as the top independent spender in Georgia's 2026 legislative election cycle outside of party and legislative leadership committees, with DraftKings-affiliated PACs supporting multiple Democratic incumbents across the state. The spending drew scrutiny in light of Evans's 2024 vote in favor of HB 353, legislation that expanded coin-operated amusement machines (COAMs) in Georgia by establishing a gift card redemption system for machine winnings.

== Voting Record ==
Evans voted in favor of HB 1437 (2022), which replaced Georgia's progressive income tax structure with a flat rate. She has supported charter school expansion legislation in every legislative session since her first term in 2013, including SB 82 (2025) and SR 287(2015), the latter of which was subsequently rejected by Georgia voters in a November 2016 statewide referendum. The American Conservative Union's CPAC ratings gave Evans a score of 30 out of 100 for the 2025 legislative session, reflecting votes in line with conservative priorities on issues including the flat tax, charter school expansion, and firearm licensing.
