= Jason Spencer =

American politician (born 1974)

Member of the Georgia House of Representatives from the 180th district
- In office January 10, 2011 – July 31, 2018
- Preceded by: Cecily Hill
- Succeeded by: Steven Sainz

Personal details
- Born: Jason Chauncey Spencer; February 14, 1974 (age 52) Offutt AFB, Nebraska, U.S.
- Party: Republican
- Education: University of Georgia (BS); South University (BS); University of Nebraska (MPAS)
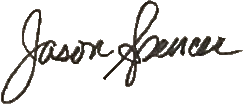
- Signature

Jason Chauncey Spencer (born November 14, 1974) is an American physician assistant and Republican politician.

Spencer was elected to the Georgia House of Representatives in 2010, representing district 180, and serving into July 2018. He was defeated by Steven Sainz in the May 2018 Republican primary for Georgia House of Representatives District 180. He strongly opposed the Affordable Care Act and helped prevent Medicaid expansion in Georgia.

Spencer faced widespread criticism in July 2018 for his behavior during an episode of the satirical television show Who Is America? in which British comedian Sacha Baron Cohen, disguised as an Israeli counter-terrorist expert, led Spencer to drop his pants and shout multiple racial slurs. Criticized by Republican leaders, Spencer announced later that month that he would resign from the Georgia House of Representatives, and was replaced by Steven Sainz.

== Early life ==
The family moved in 1978 to Moody Air Force Base in Valdosta, Georgia, and a year later to Alapaha, Georgia. Spencer graduated from Berrien High School in 1993. He attended Abraham Baldwin Agricultural College before transferring to Alabama State University, a historically black college (HBCU), on a full athletic scholarship for tennis. He transferred again to the University of Georgia, from which he graduated in 1997 with a degree in exercise & sport science. Spencer studied and trained as a physician assistant, receiving a second bachelor's degree from South University in Savannah and a master's degree in physician assistant studies from the University of Nebraska Medical Center in 2005.

== Political career ==
=== Electoral history ===
An active member of the Tea Party movement in coastal Georgia, Spencer was first elected to the Georgia House of Representatives in 2010 after defeating incumbent Cecily Hill in a primary runoff. His district centers on Woodbine in southeastern Georgia. He was reelected in 2012, 2014, and 2016.

=== Legislative mentions ===
Spencer served on the following committees in the Georgia State House: Science and Technology; Games, Fish and Parks; Juvenile Justice; Human Aging and Relations, and served as the Secretary to the House Special Rules Committee. He voted for legislation that relaxed “live-aboard” boating restrictions and legalized home brew beer competitions in Georgia.

Spencer served as an advocate for survivors of child sexual abuse, introducing and gaining passage in 2015 of a landmark civil statute of limitations (SOL) reform legislation, known as the Georgia Hidden Predator Act (HB 17, 2015). This legislation removed or extended the civil SOL so survivors can gain justice and expose the identities of hidden child abusers in the state of Georgia. The Hidden Predator Act was instrumental in leading to the unraveling of one of the largest sex scandals in U.S. sports history: the exposure of Dr. Larry Nassar, who was later convicted of serial child molestation committed while serving the USA Gymnastics organization. Rep. Spencer received Voice Today's "Voice of Gratitude Award" for his efforts authoring the legislation.

In 2018, Spencer attempted to amend this 2015 law to strengthen it and provide more time for survivors to file cases, but the bill was weakened by lobbying efforts from the Atlanta Archdiocese of the Catholic Church, the Boy Scouts of America, and other powerful interest groups. It narrowly failed to pass on the last day of the 2018 legislative session.

In 2017, Spencer introduced and passed legislation, known as the Georgia Space Flight Act (House Bill 1, 2017), to attract the commercial space industry to Georgia as part of an ongoing effort to establish the state's first commercial spaceport.

=== Issues during tenure ===
Spencer was one of the strongest opponents in the Georgia House to President Barack Obama's administration's Affordable Care Act (ACA). He authored legislation that effectively blocked Medicaid expansion in Georgia. Spencer also blocked the establishment of the state's insurance marketplace, and forced the University of Georgia to terminate its "Obamacare" Navigator program under the Act. In 2014, Spencer introduced legislation to block the state from "using of its resources to implement any portions of the health care law." When this legislation was tabled by Senate Majority Whip Cecil Station (R-Macon) and other opponents in committee, Spencer issued a press release blaming fellow Republicans for an "eleventh hour betrayal" and likening them to "Benedict Arnolds, the King George the Third and his myrmidons."

In 2016, after facing bipartisan opposition, Spencer withdrew a bill that was perceived to have banned Muslim women from wearing religious garments such as burqas or niqābs in driver's license photographs or while driving cars. The legislation aimed to amend an existing 1951 Georgia law intended to prohibit members of the Ku Klux Klan from wearing masks and hoods; it had been constitutionally upheld by the Georgia Supreme Court in State v Miller, 1990 to unmask members of the group. Many, including the Council on American–Islamic Relations (CAIR) and American Civil Liberties Union, accused Spencer of Islamophobia.

Spencer accused a constituent of treason and supporting terrorism for donating $10 to CAIR Georgia in response to his bill. Spencer supported his charge of potential treason in a letter written to his constituent stating that the Council on American–Islamic Relations (CAIR) was designated as a terrorist organization by the United Arab Emirates due to the organization's alleged ties to Hamas, an organization which has been designated a terrorist organization by the U.S. Department of State. In addition, Spencer stated that CAIR was named by the U.S. Justice Department as an unindicted co-conspirator in the largest terrorism funding trials in U.S. history, known as United States v Holy Land Foundation, et al., claims which CAIR has rejected. As a result of the backlash of submitting this legislation, Spencer said he had received death threats.

In 2017, Spencer attracted controversy in the debate over the removal of Confederate monuments and memorials. In a Facebook post, he issued a warning to LaDawn Jones, an African American attorney, former Georgia House colleague and current State Director for Bernie Sanders' Presidential Campaign, that she might "go missing in the Okefenokee," a swamp in southern Georgia (and partly in Spencer's district), if she followed through on her intentions to bring advocates to southern Georgia to remove Confederate monuments.

=== Primary defeat ===
In May 2018, Spencer was defeated in the Republican primary by a primary challenger, 24-year-old political newcomer Steven Sainz. A local party leader attributed Spencer's loss in part to his "antics" in office. Spencer said "if he rubbed anyone the wrong way," he was doing so by standing up to powerful special interest representing the plight of "little guy." “My tactics won against them and that is one of the reasons why I stayed in office for eight years, because I effectively beat them at their own game,” said Spencer to the Brunswick News. In a radio interview with WGIG 1440 AM, Rep. Jason Spencer said that he had often been a target of individuals on the ideological left and establishment politicians for introducing legislation that challenged powerful special interests. He believed such opponents blocked a bill in 2018 to strengthen a law extending civil justice to survivors of child sexual abuse.

== Who Is America? controversy ==
Spencer was featured in an episode of the satirical television show Who Is America? that aired on July 22, 2018. The episode showed British comedian Sacha Baron Cohen, disguised as an Israeli counter-terrorism expert, leading Spencer to drop his pants, imitate a Chinese tourist using racial stereotypes that mixed various East Asian stereotypes, use a selfie stick to take an upskirt picture under a woman's burqa, and repeatedly yell "nigger".

Georgia House Speaker David Ralston urged Spencer to resign, saying that he had disgraced himself. Governor Nathan Deal tweeted that Spencer's actions were "appalling and offensive". Spencer apologized for what he described as "this ridiculously ugly episode" but initially refused to step down, saying that the show's producers had exploited him "for profit and notoriety". He said that Baron Cohen and the television crew had falsely promised that he would be able to review and approve the final footage before release. Spencer later announced his resignation on July 24, effective as of July 31.

== Election results ==
2010 Republican primary, State Representative, District 180
Party	Candidate	Votes	%
Republican	Cecily Hill	2,010	44.3%
Republican	Jason Spencer	1,615	35.6%
Republican	Rindy Howell	911	20.1%

2010 Republican primary runoff, State Representative, District 180
Party	Candidate	Votes	%
Republican	Jason Spencer	2,193	54.9%
Republican	Cecily Hill	1,805	45.1%

2010 general election, State Representative, District 180
Party	Candidate	Votes	%
Republican	Jason Spencer	7,701	69.5%
Democratic	Adell James	3,384	30.5%

2012 Republican primary, State Representative, District 180
Party	Candidate	Votes	%
Republican	Jason Spencer	4,157	51.68%
Republican	Adam Jacobson	3,886	48.32%

2012 general election, State Representative, District 180
Party	Candidate	Votes	%
Republican	Jason Spencer (unopposed)	14,671	100%

2014 Republican primary, State Representative, District 180
Party	Candidate	Votes	%
Republican	Jason Spencer	2,759	58.95%
Republican	Nancy H. Stasinis	1,921	41.05%

2014 general election, State Representative, District 180
Party	Candidate	Votes	%
Republican	Jason Spencer (unopposed)	8,534	100%

2016 Republican primary, State Representative, District 180
Party	Candidate	Votes	%
Republican	Jason Spencer (unopposed)	3,086	100%

2016 general election, State Representative, District 180
Party	Candidate	Votes	%
Republican	Jason Spencer (unopposed)	16,168	100%

May 22, 2018 Republican primary, State Representative, District 180
Party	Candidate	Votes	%
Republican	Steven Sainz	2,462	57.81%
Republican	Jason Spencer	1,797	42.19%
