= Paulette Rakestraw =

American politician

Member of the Georgia House of Representatives from the 19th district
- In office January 10, 2011 – January 14, 2019
- Preceded by: Daniel Stout
- Succeeded by: Joseph Gullett

Personal details
- Born: May 7, 1967 (age 59)
- Party: Republican

Paulette Rakestraw (born May 7, 1967) is an American politician who served in the Georgia House of Representatives from the 19th district from 2011 to 2019. First elected in 2011, she served until losing a primary election run-off for the Republican nomination.

Rakestraw earned her bachelor's degrees in communications and PR from Kennesaw State University.
