= CJ Pearson =

American conservative activist (born 2002)

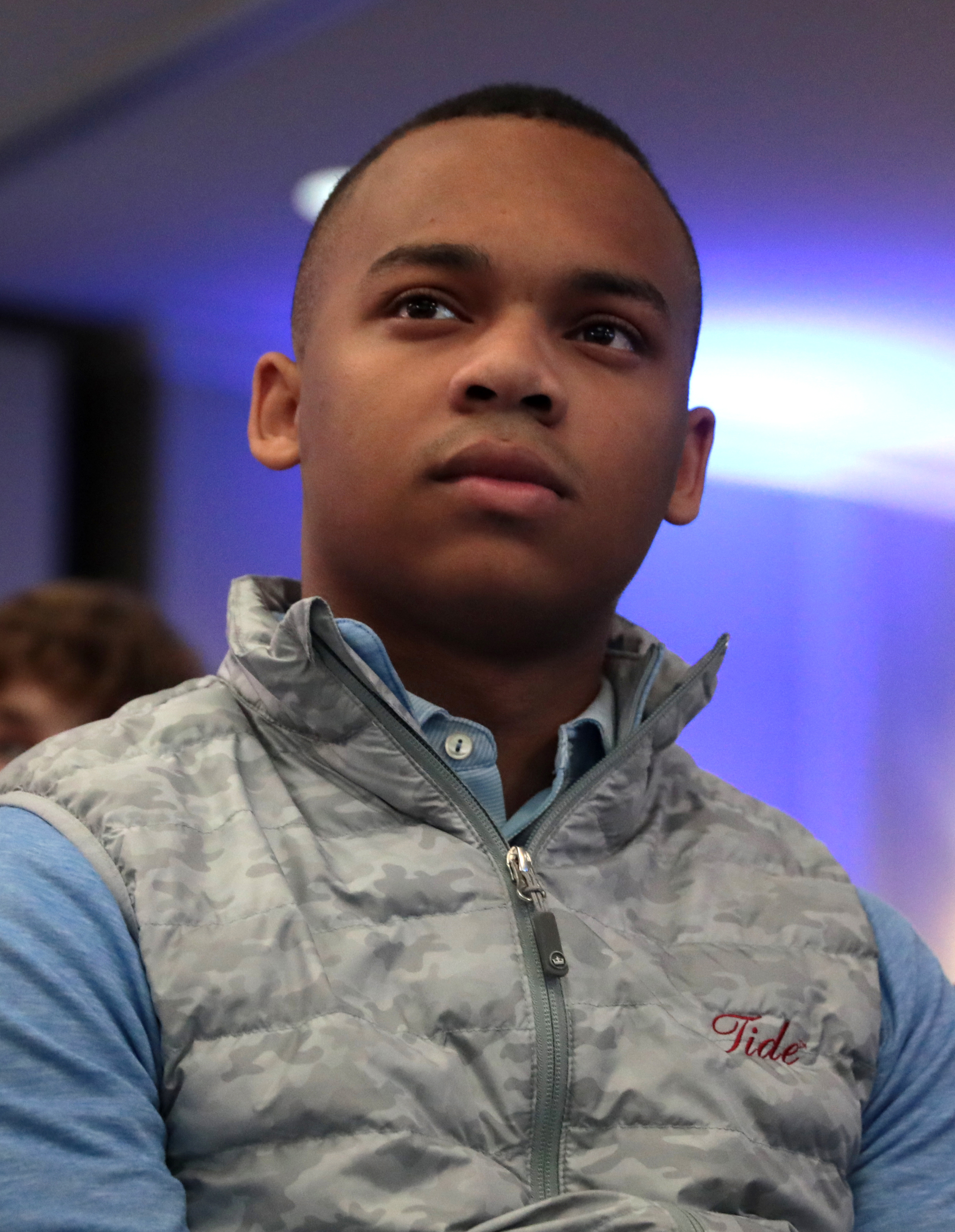
- Pearson in 2021

Chair of the Republican National Committee Youth Advisory Council
- Incumbent
- Assumed office 2022 Serving with Brilyn Hollyhand
- Preceded by: Position established

Personal details
- Born: Coreco Ja'Quan Pearson; July 31, 2002 (age 24)
- Party: Republican
- Education: University of Alabama (attended)
- Website: cjpearson.org

Coreco Ja'Quan Pearson (born July 31, 2002) is an American lobbyist and a conservative activist and media personality who serves as co-chair of the Republican National Committee Youth Advisory Council since 2022.

From Georgia, Pearson developed an early interest in politics and began blogging in support of local conservative politicians at age eight. He gained national attention in 2015 after uploading a video to YouTube defending comments made by former Mayor Rudy Giuliani about President Barack Obama while also criticizing the president. After this, Pearson became further involved in Republican politics. He campaigned for several Republican politicians during the 2016 presidential election, founded a non-profit organization, filed a lawsuit in an attempt to overturn the 2020 presidential election, and ran unsuccessfully for a seat in the Georgia House of Representatives.

Pearson has registered as a foreign agent under the United States Foreign Agents Registration Act.

== Early life ==
Coreco Ja'Quan Pearson was born on July 31, 2002. His mother was a high school senior at the time of his birth, and he was raised by his grandparents, retired sergeant major Willie Pearson and former educator Robin Pearson. (Note: Several sources described Willie and Robin Pearson as his parents; however, a subsequent article from Tampa Bay Times identify the couple as Pearson's grandparents.) Pearson first became interested in politics when his second grade class held a mock presidential election representing that of the 2008 United States presidential election. He voted for Republican nominee John McCain in the mock election because he was inspired by McCain's military service. Pearson began an active role in politics at age eight by blogging in support of different conservative politicians in Georgia and participated in political campaigning in the 2014 midterm elections. In November 2014, he founded a political group named Young Georgians in Government to involve young people in politics. Pearson and his group advocated for a constitutional amendment to the Georgia constitution that would lower the minimum age of candidacy for public office in the state to 18 for the Georgia House of Representatives and 21 for the Georgia Senate. Pearson attended Evans High School, graduating in 2020.

== Career ==
=== YouTube video and 2016 presidential election (2015–2016) ===
In February 2015, Pearson received national media attention after he created a YouTube channel on February 21 and two days later posted a video, "President Obama: Do you really love America?" in which he defended former mayor of New York City Rudy Giuliani about the comments Giuliani had made saying about President Barack Obama: "I do not believe that the president loves America." Pearson also criticized Obama for his stance on Islamic extremism and questioned the president's devotion to the country.

During the 2016 presidential election, Pearson campaigned for several different Republican presidential candidates. In April 2015, he campaigned for Kentucky senator Rand Paul's presidential campaign. In September 2015, Pearson left Paul's campaign and joined Texas senator Ted Cruz's presidential campaign following Pearson's earlier endorsement of Cruz in July. Cruz named Pearson as national chairman of Teens for Ted. Pearson, after two months, left the Cruz campaign and said that he disavowed conservatism. He subsequently endorsed Vermont senator Bernie Sanders in December 2015. Pearson again switched his endorsement to Republican nominee Donald Trump and joined his presidential campaign as the national chairman of Teens for Trump.

While working for the Cruz presidential campaign, Pearson faced controversy when on September 23, 2015, when he falsely claimed that he was blocked from President Obama's official presidential account on Twitter, due to comments he made criticizing Obama for inviting high school student Ahmed Mohamed to the White House after Mohamed was suspended for bringing an invention to school. White House assistant press secretary Frank Benenati made a statement that no one has ever been blocked from Obama's account, with other users on Twitter challenging Beneati's statement regarding the matter. Pearson denounced the claim made by the White House, stated that they were lying about him. He later said he made a mistake.

In May 2016, while attending Columbia Middle School, Pearson faced disciplinary action for allegedly bullying two white female students in an Instagram group chat. He claimed his actions were retaliation for several comments, some of which were sexual in nature, and that the two girls were "the real bullies" and urged his supporters to contact the Columbia County School District on his behalf. Pearson faced suspension for the remainder of the school year after attending a disciplinary hearing.

=== 2020 presidential election ===
In June 2020, Pearson helped raise $160,000 for black-owned businesses that were damaged or destroyed during the protests in Metro Atlanta as the result of the murder of George Floyd. In July, he founded a conservative non-profit organization called Free Thinker Project with plans to set up local chapters similar to Turning Point USA. He also travelled across the country campaigning for President Donald Trump's reelection campaign during the 2020 presidential election.

Pearson was nominated by the Republican Party to serve as an elector in the 2020 presidential election in Georgia. However, it was unclear whether he would have served as an elector if President Trump won; The Atlanta Journal-Constitution reported that he did not serve as an elector because his residence was in Alabama while studying at the University of Alabama, and a list published by States Newsroom names him as one of Trump's fake electors following his election loss to President-elect Joe Biden. Federal investigators announced they were interviewing Georgia Republicans who refused to serve as fake electors and contacted Pearson who said he would cooperate.

Following Biden's victory in the 2020 presidential election, Pearson promoted false claims of fraud in the election in an attempt to overturn the election results. In late November, Pearson–represented by former Trump attorney Sidney Powell–sued Georgia Governor Brian Kemp and others in Pearson v. Kemp, a lawsuit filed in the United States District Court for the Northern District of Georgia that attempted to overturn Biden's victory in the state. In December 2020, the court dismissed the suit.

=== Political advisory and Georgia House campaign (2022–present) ===
Pearson served as the campaign manager for Vernon Jones's 2022 Georgia gubernatorial campaign. Pearson attended the University of Alabama and served in the student government before dropping out to relocate to Los Angeles in October 2022 after accepting a job with PragerU. In November, Republican National Committee chair Ronna McDaniel announced the formation of the Republican Party Advisory Council and Pearson became a co-chair of the youth council with various other members, including Brilyn Hollyhand. (Note: LAist identifies Pearson and Hollyhand as co-chairs of the Youth Advisory Council and cite a press release from the Republican National Committee announcing the formation of the council in November 2022.)

Pearson announced in January 2024 his candidacy in a special election for the Georgia House of Representatives's 125th district to finish the term of Barry Fleming, who resigned to become a state superior court judge. His residency in the district was challenged by a voter who believed he may not have been qualified to run. Pearson had been a registered voter in Columbia County, Georgia since March 2020, although he did not vote in any jurisdiction until 2024 and maintained other residences, including in Columbia County, Tuscaloosa, Alabama, and North Hollywood, California. According to the Alabama Secretary of State, he had an inactive voter registration record in the state and previously filed to run for a seat in the Tuscaloosa city council in January 2021 despite being apparently registered to vote in Georgia. Pearson won the residency challenge on February 9. The election was held on February 13 in which Pearson came in second place after Gary Richardson. Since both candidates did not receive a majority vote they appeared again in a runoff election on March 12. Pearson was defeated by Richardson in the runoff for the partial-term and both candidates were scheduled to appear again in the May Republican primary to seek a full two-year term. Pearson later withdrew from the race to focus on former President Donald Trump's presidential campaign in the 2024 presidential election.

In January 2025, Pearson was involved in a public dispute with New York magazine regarding its cover story, "The Cruel Kids Table," which he said inaccurately depicted young supporters of President Trump at a Washington nightclub on the eve of Trump's inauguration as attending a whites-only event. Pearson, who co-hosted the event, criticised the publication for cropping him out of the cover photo and minimizing black attendees who are Trump supporters. New York defended the article, saying, "We believe both the cover and story provide an accurate impression of the weekend." In February, Pearson signed with United Talent Agency as part of its move to increase the number of Washington insiders it represents. In July, he was named in Time's TIME100 Creators list. Since Trump's second inauguration, Pearson has engaged in outreach efforts aimed at young and Black voters in support of the MAGA movement and publicly commented on a potential future candidacy.

=== Lobbying ===
In April 2026, Pearson registered as a lobbyist for the government of the Bahamas under the Foreign Agents Registration Act. Pearson was paid $20,000 dollars a month to lobby the U.S. government on the behalf of the Bahamas. Pearson registered on behalf of lobbying group DCI Group alongside Roger Stone. In September 2026, Pearson registered to lobby for Israeli drone manufacturing company XTEND Reality, a company whose investors include Eric Trump and Len Blavatnik. Pearson's responsibilities for XTEND Reality include "public relations, promotion, and perception-management activities."

== Political views ==
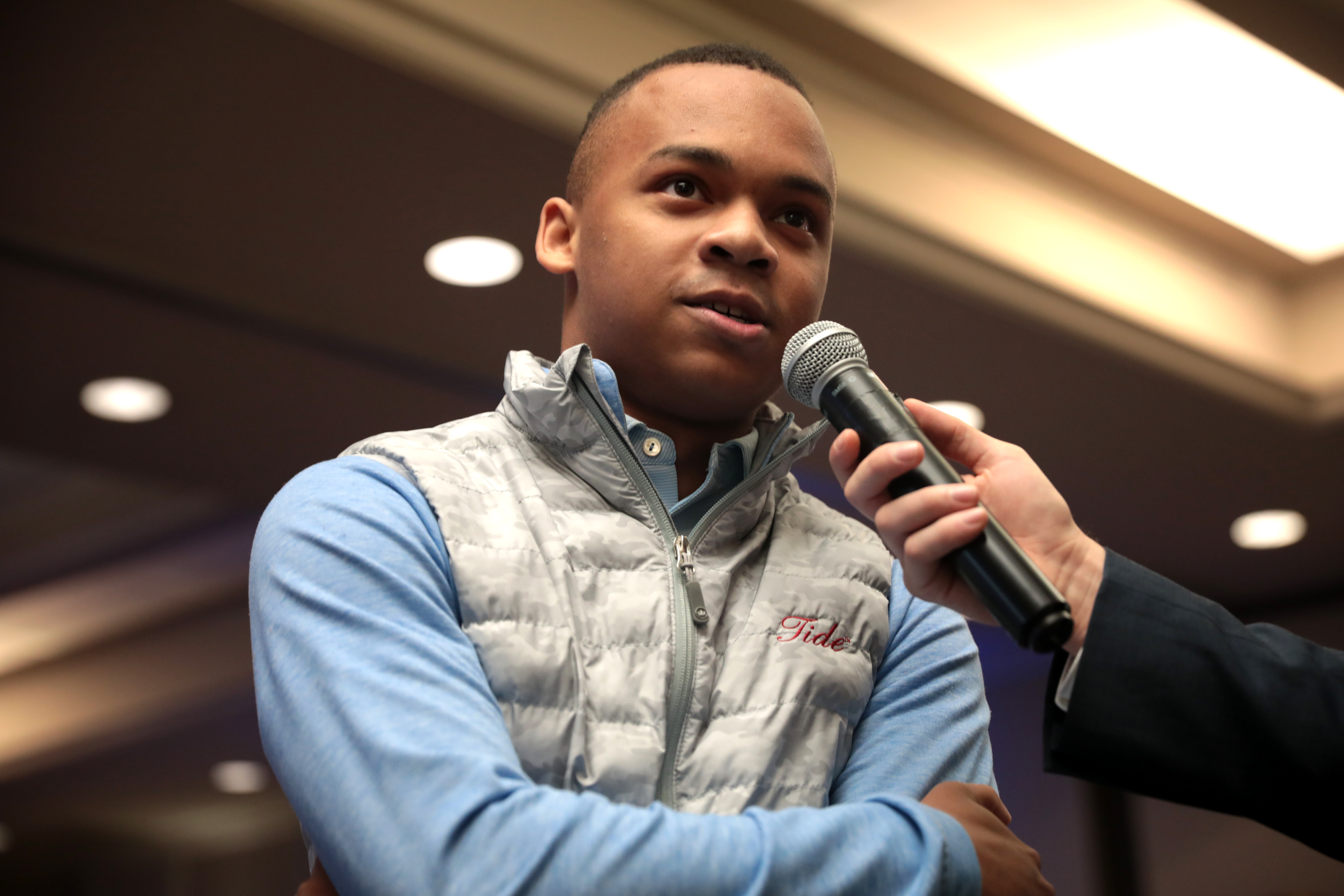
Pearson speaking with attendees at a Turning Point USA event at the University of Alabama, November 2021.

In 2015, Pearson described himself as a fiscal conservative and social liberal with libertarian leanings. He supports same-sex marriage and said that younger people have "generally been taught to treat everyone equally, no matter who you are." During the 2016 United States presidential election, Pearson campaigned for several Republican candidates. Before the Republican primaries, he endorsed Rand Paul and later Ted Cruz. In November 2015, Pearson said that he "renounced conservatism" and was questioning the ideology of the Republican Party, stating that "My views on the issues aren't going to be dictated by one political platform or another." He endorsed Bernie Sanders, who was seeking the Democratic nomination, in December and later wrote that the prospect of a Trump presidency "scares the crap out of me." He endorsed Trump in August 2016.

During the 2020 presidential election, Pearson campaigned for Trump's reelection. Following Trump's loss to President-elect Joe Biden, Pearson promoted the false claim that there was fraud in the election and spoke at a Stop the Steal rally. During his bid for the Georgia House of Representatives, Pearson expressed support for abolishing state income tax in Georgia and opposed critical race theory. He also opposed sanctuary state and catch and release immigration policies in Georgia and is opposed to abortion.

== Electoral history ==
Georgia's 125th House district special election, 2024 Vacancy resulting from resignation of Barry Fleming
Primary election
Party	Candidate	Votes	%
Republican	Gary Richardson	1,694	37.50
Republican	CJ Pearson	1,390	30.77
Republican	Jim Steed	794	17.58
Democratic	Kay Turner	612	13.55
Libertarian	John Turpish	27	0.60
Total votes		4,517	100.0

Georgia's 125th House district special election runoff, 2024
Primary election
Party	Candidate	Votes	%
Republican	Gary Richardson	3,916	60.20
Republican	CJ Pearson	2,589	39.80
Total votes		6,505	100.0
Republican hold			

== See also ==
- Black conservatism in the United States
- Jonathan Krohn – as a minor was also notable as a conservative activist
