= David Knight (politician) =

American politician

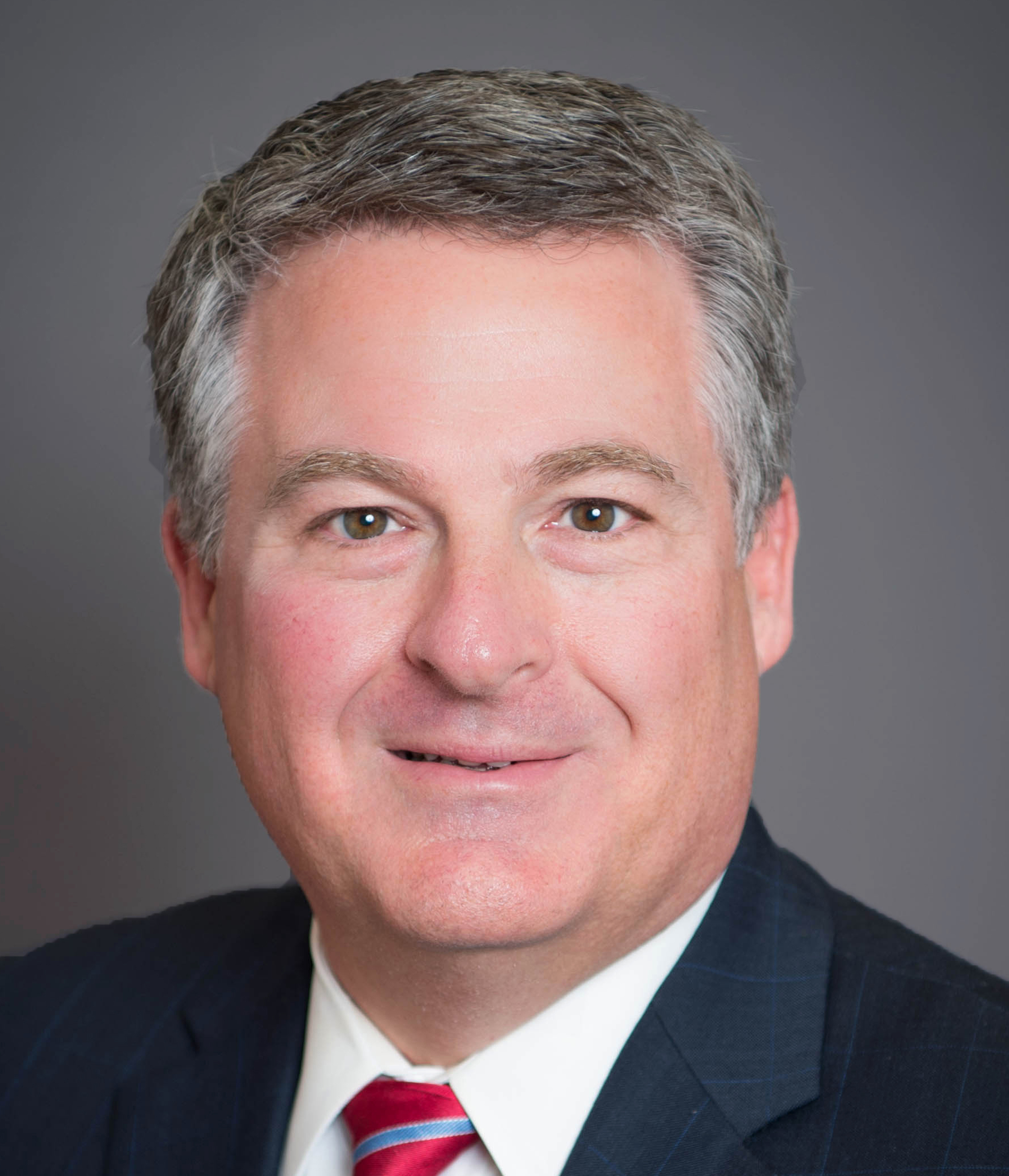

Member of the Georgia House of Representatives
- In office January 10, 2005 – January 13, 2025
- Preceded by: Burke Day
- Succeeded by: Robert Dickey (redistricting)
- Constituency: 126th District (2005–2013); 130th District (2013–2023); 134th District (2023–2025)

Personal details
- Born: July 9, 1969 (age 57) Warner Robins, Georgia, U.S.
- Party: Republican

David Knight (born July 9, 1969) is an American politician who has served in the Georgia House of Representatives from 2005 to 2025.

Georgia House of Representatives
Preceded by Burke Day	Member of the Georgia House of Representatives from the 126th district 2005–2013	Succeeded by Gloria Frazier
Preceded by Debbie Buckner	Member of the Georgia House of Representatives from the 130th district 2013–2023	Succeeded by Lynn Gladney
Preceded by Richard Smith	Member of the Georgia House of Representatives from the 134th district 2023–2025	Incumbent
