= Election Integrity Act of 2021 =

Election law in Georgia, United States

Georgia State Legislature
- Full name: Election Integrity Act of 2021
- Introduced: February 17, 2021
- House voted: March 25, 2021
- Senate voted: March 8, 2021
- Signed into law: March 25, 2021
- Sponsor(s): Sens. Max Burns, Butch Miller, Michael Dugan, Frank Ginn, Lee Anderson, Randy Robertson, Jeff Mullis, John Albers, Larry Walker III, Matt Brass, Jason Anavitarte, Marty Harbin, Billy Hickman, Dean Burke, Sheila McNeill, Brandon Beach, Bruce Thompson, Tyler Harper, Carden Summers, Chuck Payne, Chuck Hufstetler, Blake Tillery, John Kennedy; Rep. Barry Fleming
- Governor: Brian Kemp
- Code: Elections
- Resolution: SB 202
- Website: legis.ga.gov

Status: Current legislation

The Election Integrity Act of 2021, originally known as the Georgia Senate Bill 202, is a law in the U.S. state of Georgia overhauling elections in the state. It replaced signature matching requirements on absentee ballots with voter identification requirements, limits the use of ballot drop boxes, expands in-person early voting, bars officials from sending out unsolicited absentee ballot request forms, reduces the amount of time people have to request an absentee ballot, increases voting stations or staff and equipment where there have been long lines, makes it a crime for outside groups to give free food or water to voters waiting in line, gives the Georgia General Assembly greater control over election administration, and shortens runoff elections, among other provisions.

The bill has generated significant controversy, described by critics as unprecedented and widespread Republican-led anti-democratic voting restrictions, with President Joe Biden labeling the bill "Jim Crow in the 21st century". Georgia governor Brian Kemp called criticism of the bill "disingenuous and completely false", and has argued that it differs little from voting laws in most other states. In June 2021, the Department of Justice sued Georgia over the law, which it alleges is racially discriminatory. In October 2023, a federal judge upheld multiple provisions of the law, citing a lack of evidence that the law is racially discriminatory.

Early voting turnout surged in the 2022 election cycle that followed the law's passage, with debate over the impact of the law on early voting. After the 2022 election cycle, polling from the University of Georgia found that 99% of Georgia voters did not have issues voting.

== Key provisions ==
Text of the act

=== Absentee voting ===
==== Ballot drop boxes ====
In response to the COVID-19 pandemic, officials in Georgia allowed the use of ballot drop boxes in the 2020 United States presidential election. The Election Integrity Act codifies the permanent use of drop boxes in general elections and mandates at least one box per county but also places some restrictions on their use. Most notably, it limits additional drop boxes to either one per 100,000 registered voters or one per voting location, whichever is fewer; this caps the number of drop boxes in the four counties making up the core of the Atlanta metro area (Fulton County, Cobb County, DeKalb County, and Gwinnett County) at 23 or fewer, depending on how many early-voting sites the counties provide, which was significantly fewer than the 94 drop boxes the counties used in the 2020 United States presidential election in Georgia. It also requires drop boxes to be located indoors in early voting locations and mandates that they only be accessible when those polling locations are open (in the 2020 election, drop boxes were available 24 hours per day, 7 days a week in a variety of locations), and closes drop boxes four days before Election Day, when turning absentee ballots into the US Post Office begins running the risk they will arrive at election offices late.

==== Voter ID and removal of signature match ====
The bill requires absentee voters to provide their driver's license or state ID number, last four digits of their Social Security number, or a photo copy of an accepted form of identification when requesting an absentee ballot, such as a utility bill. This replaced requirements for absentee voters to provide their signatures, which were verified by signature matching conducted by poll workers.

==== Absentee ballot requests ====
The act shortens the amount of time voters have to request absentee ballots by over half, pushing the beginning of the time period voters can request an absentee ballot from six months before the election to three months before, and moving back the deadline to request an absentee from four days before Election Day to eleven days before. It also bars state and local officials from sending out unsolicited absentee ballot request applications to registered voters. (Note: In the June 2020 Georgia primary election, Secretary of State Brad Raffensperger mailed every registered voter in the state an absentee ballot application. For the 2020 United States presidential election, he did not do the same; several local government agencies, particularly urban ones, mailed voters absentee ballot request forms.)

=== Early in-person voting ===
The bill mandates three weeks of in-person early voting, including two Saturdays and the option of including two Sundays. This will expand early voting in rural counties. It also bans the use of mobile voting centers outside of declared disasters, which were utilized in Fulton County in the 2020 presidential election.

=== Legislative control of election administration ===
The bill gives the Georgia General Assembly greater control over election administration. Ordinarily, important administrative decisions like ballot disqualification and certification of results are made by county boards of elections. Under the new law, the State Board of Elections is empowered to replace county boards with an administrator chosen at the state level if the State Board deems a county board to be performing poorly. It simultaneously gives the Georgia General Assembly greater control over the State Board by replacing the Georgia Secretary of State as chair of the board, who is made an ex-officio, nonvoting member, with an official appointed by the legislature; the legislature already appoints two of the five seats on the board, so under the new law the legislature appoints a majority of the board. According to the Atlanta Journal-Constitution, this enables "state takeovers of local election offices", including deciding which ballots should be disqualified, and could "change the outcome of future elections, especially if they're as hotly contested as the 2020 presidential election between Democrat Joe Biden and Republican Donald Trump".

The provision has been linked to unsuccessful attempts to overturn the 2020 United States presidential election in Georgia by Republicans, especially in heavily Democratic counties like Fulton County. In that election, many Republican state lawmakers made unfounded allegations of widespread voter fraud, claimed that the State Board of Elections had exceeded its authority in approving certain new rules to make voting more accessible during the COVID-19 pandemic in the United States, pushed for election results to be overturned, and attempted to call an emergency special session to award the state's electoral votes in the Electoral College to Trump. Writing for Vox, Zack Beauchamp commented that the bill "allows Republicans to seize control of how elections are administered in Fulton County and other heavily Democratic areas, disqualifying voters and ballots as they see fit." It has also been alleged that the provision removing the Secretary of State from the Board of Elections is targeted at Brad Raffensperger, the Republican Secretary of State who oversaw the 2020 election in Georgia and famously rebuffed attempts by Trump and state lawmakers to overturn Georgia's election results.

=== Runoff and primary elections ===
In Georgia, Senate elections employ a runoff system in which the top two candidates go to a second-round runoff election if no candidate receives over 50% of the vote in the first round. Additionally, prior to the passage of the Election Integrity Act, U.S. Senate special elections (elections held to replace a senator who has resigned or died) used nonpartisan blanket elections, also referred to as jungle elections, in which all candidates, regardless of political party, ran against each other in the first round. The Election Integrity Act shortens the runoff election from nine weeks after the first round to four weeks, which has the effect of reducing early voting for the second round election to just a few days, and replaces the nonpartisan blanket election in special elections with a standard partisan election preceded by party primary elections. It would also prohibit new voters from being registered for the runoff. According to the Atlanta Journal-Constitution, these provisions have the effect of making it more likely that the leading candidate in the first round will prevail in the runoff.

The changes have been linked to the 2020 United States Senate elections in Georgia, (Note: Two Senate elections were held in Georgia in 2020: the regularly scheduled 2020–21 United States Senate election in Georgia, in which the Republican incumbent David Perdue was unseated by Jon Ossoff, a Democrat, and the 2020–21 United States Senate special election in Georgia to fill the seat vacated by Republican Johnny Isakson, in which Democrat Raphael Warnock defeated Republican Kelly Loeffler, who had temporarily held the seat after being appointed by the Republican Governor Brian Kemp following Isakson's resignation.) in which the Democratic candidates unseated the incumbent Republicans, delivering a narrow Senate majority to the Democratic Party. According to the Atlanta Journal-Constitution, had these changes been in place for the 2020 elections, they may have made it more likely that the Republican incumbents would have held their seats. In particular, shortened runoffs would have shortened early voting, which benefited Democrats in the 2020 Senate races; and no nonpartisan blanket elections in the special election would have prevented the protracted intra-party battles between the leading Republican candidates Kelly Loeffler and Doug Collins, which diverted energy away from campaigning against Democratic candidate Raphael Warnock.

=== Long voting lines ===
In Georgia, the number and location of polling places is established by county officials. Long voting lines have been a problem in Georgia and they are most common in poor, urban areas, which tend to vote more heavily for the Democratic Party. The bill makes efforts to reduce long lines at voting stations. County officials in charge of precincts with more than 2,000 voters that had waited longer than an hour in the 2020 elections will be required to either open another voting station or add more staff, equipment, or both to the existing station. Poll workers will be allowed to work in counties where they do not reside.

=== Providing free food and water ===
As part of a broader ban on giving out money or gifts to voters, Section 33 of the act makes it illegal to provide free food or water to people waiting in line to vote within 150 feet (46 m) of polling locations and 25 feet (7.6 m) of voting lines, except that volunteers and election officials are allowed to make available self-service water from an unattended dispenser to voters in line. Critics have argued that the provision disproportionately affects Black voters, who face longer lines on average. Proponents have argued that allowing partisan volunteers to hand out food and water provided an opportunity for illegal campaigning to voters in line. As of August 2023, the prohibition on offering of free food or water within 150 feet of polling locations was upheld, while the prohibition on offerings within 25 feet of voters waiting in line, but over 150 feet from polling locations, was temporarily blocked in court.

This law played a key role in the plot of the final season of the HBO show Curb Your Enthusiasm.

=== Polling location ===
Prior to the law, Georgia voters who mistakenly went to the incorrect polling location were allowed to cast provisional ballots, which are ballots that are set aside to verify eligibility. In the 2020 presidential election, wrong polling location was by far the most common reason for casting a provisional ballot, and provisional ballots as a whole went much more heavily to Democratic candidate Joe Biden than the state as a whole. The new law removes the option of casting a provisional ballot if the voter arrives at the wrong polling location prior to 5 pm and instead requires them to travel to the correct precinct.

=== Private funding of elections ===
The bill prohibits third party funding of elections. Many jurisdictions in Georgia, particularly those in poorer urban areas, used donations from outside organizations like the Center for Tech and Civic Life to fund elections in 2020.

== Legislative history ==
The Republican effort to reform voting laws began in early January, 2021, when Georgia Republicans appointed state Representative Barry Fleming, who as attorney of Hancock County had defended a controversial voter roll update that challenged the eligibility of nearly 20% of Sparta, Georgia's residents (almost all Black), to the chairmanship of the Georgia Special Committee on Election Integrity. By late February, the first elections bill had cleared a chamber of the Georgia General Assembly. Passed in the Georgia State Senate on February 23, 2021, in a nearly party-line vote, Senate Bill 67 would have required a photo ID when requesting an absentee ballot.

The first comprehensive election bill to be considered was House Bill 531, sponsored by Fleming. That bill would have restricted where ballot boxes can be located and when they can be accessed, required photo identification for absentee voting, made the deadline to request an absentee ballot earlier, made it a misdemeanor to hand out food or drink to voters waiting in line, and limited early voting hours on weekends, among many other changes. Most controversially, it would have restricted early voting on Sundays, when Black churches traditionally run "Souls to the Polls" get-out-the-vote efforts. House Bill 531 passed the House in a party-line vote on March 1, 2021.

In the Senate, Senate Bill 202 first appeared as a small, two-page bill to prohibit organizations from sending absentee ballot applications to voters who have already requested a ballot. It passed in that form on March 8; the deadline bills must pass at least one chamber of the Assembly. On March 17, 2021, with House Bill 531, Fleming's original comprehensive elections bill, now being considered in the Senate, word emerged that the two-page Senate Bill 202 (by now in the House) would be vastly expanded by Fleming into a 93-page omnibus bill. As the end of March neared (the Georgia General Assembly adjourns on March 31), Republican efforts consolidated around the two omnibus bills. The bill, named the Election Integrity Act of 2021, was passed by the House in a vote of 100–75 and by the Senate in a vote of 34–20 on March 25, 2021. The bill was signed into law by the Republican Governor of Georgia, Brian Kemp, that evening.

Geoff Duncan, the Republican Lieutenant Governor of Georgia, said that momentum for the legislation grew from misinformation by former president Donald Trump and Rudy Giuliani. The bill is part of Republican efforts to change election laws in various states following the 2020 presidential election. Democratic presidential candidate Joe Biden won Georgia, and Democrats won the two U.S. Senate seats that represented Georgia, a state that previously elected Republicans. According to The New York Times, the bill "will, in particular, curtail ballot access for voters in booming urban and suburban counties, home to many Democrats."

== Legal challenges ==
The bill quickly drew a number of legal challenges, with groups challenging the law including the American Civil Liberties Union (ACLU), the NAACP Legal Defense and Educational Fund, the Southern Poverty Law Center, the League of Women Voters of Georgia, the New Georgia Project, Black Voters Matter, the Sixth District of the African Methodist Episcopal Church, the Lower Muskogee Creek Tribe, the Georgia Muslim Voter Project, Women Watch Afrika, the Latino Community Fund Georgia, and Delta Sigma Theta sorority. They argue that the bill violates the Fourteenth Amendment to the United States Constitution and Section Two of the Voting Rights Act of 1965, which forbids racially discriminatory voting rules. The Georgia NAACP further alleges that Republican officials are purposefully attempting to discriminate against Black Georgians "in order to maintain the tenuous hold the Republican Party has in Georgia" (Democratic wins in the state in 2020—especially the two Senate races—were fueled by high Black turnout, as well as rapid ethnic diversification of the Atlanta metropolitan area).

On June 25, 2021, the Department of Justice announced it filed a lawsuit against Georgia over the law on the basis that it is racially discriminatory.

In July 2021, District Judge J. P. Boulee upheld provisions of the law due to the Purcell principle. At the time, early voting was underway for two state House seats.

In August 2021, Boulee granted a preliminary injunction against the law's general prohibition on photography of voted ballots, while allowing for a pre-existing ban on photography in polling places during voting. In the same ruling, Boulee upheld other portions of the law, including a prohibition on photography of a touchscreen voting machine's face while someone is voting or while a voter's selections are displayed, a prohibition on intentionally observing a voter in a way that would allow the observer to see the voter's choices, a prohibition on observers communicating information they see during absentee ballot processing to anyone other than election officials, and a requirement that absentee ballots be requested 11 days prior to an election.

In July 2022, Boulee upheld a portion of the law that prohibited mass mailing of absentee ballot applications to voters who had already requested a ballot or voted.

In August 2022, Boulee upheld a portion of the law that prohibited offers of food, water, and other gifts to voters standing in line within 150 feet of a polling precinct.

In August 2023, Boulee granted a preliminary injunction blocking election officials from imposing criminal penalties for violating the ban on food, drinks and other gifts to voters at the outer perimeter of voting lines. He also temporarily blocked counties from rejecting ballots of voters who fail to write their proper date of birth on absentee ballot envelopes. Boulee upheld prohibitions on unauthorized people from returning absentee ballots for others and restrictions on the location and hourly availability of ballot drop boxes.

In October 2023, Boulee upheld multiple provisions of the law, including voter ID implementation, prohibitions on counting certain provisional ballots cast at the wrong precinct, limiting of ballot drop boxes, and shortening of the window to apply for absentee ballots. Plaintiffs in this case alleged disparate racial impacts from these provisions, but Boulee stated that "Plaintiffs have not shown, at least at this stage of the proceedings, that any of the provisions have a disparate impact on black voters." Boulee found that plaintiffs failed to meet their burden to show that the law was passed with a discriminatory intent.

In January 2024, Boulee upheld provisions of law shortening the runoff election period to 4 weeks and enacting a voter registration deadline of 29 days prior to elections. The ruling noted a lack of evidence showing discrimination against Black voters.

In March 2025, the Department of Justice dropped the 2021 lawsuit against Georgia, stating the lawsuit falsely accused Georgia of intentionally suppressing Black voters’ votes.

== Backlash ==
President Biden described the law as "Jim Crow in the 21st Century" and an "atrocity", while falsely claiming that it "ends voting hours early." He also promised that the Justice Department would "take a look" at the law.

In response to the bill, and after pressure from civil rights groups, Major League Baseball (MLB) announced it would be moving the 2021 All-Star game out of suburban Atlanta. In a statement outlining his opposition to the bill, MLB commissioner Rob Manfred asserted that "Major League Baseball fundamentally supports voting rights for all Americans and opposes restrictions to the ballot box". Georgia Governor Brian Kemp responded by claiming that the MLB caved to "fear, political opportunism, and liberal lies" and called the decision an example of cancel culture. Voting rights activist and Georgia gubernatorial candidate Stacey Abrams, who ran against Kemp in 2018 and would run against him again in 2022, stated her disappointment over the decision, saying, "I don't want to see Georgia families hurt by lost events and jobs," while also stating she understood why it was made. In early April, Republican Senators Ted Cruz and Mike Lee and Representative Jeff Duncan announced that they would be pursuing retaliatory legislation to revoke MLB's antitrust exemption over its opposition to the law.

Delta Air Lines and The Coca-Cola Company, two companies based in Georgia, issued statements denouncing the bill. In response to the criticism by Delta Air Lines (the state's largest employer), the Georgia House of Representatives passed a retaliatory bill ending a tax break on jet fuel (the bill failed to advance in the Georgia Senate). Commenting on the Delta bill, state House Speaker David Ralston quipped, "You don't feed a dog that bites your hand". The Speaker also went on camera to proclaim that he had recently drunk a Pepsi.

Other companies, including the Atlanta Falcons, Home Depot, and UPS, followed suit, issuing statements condemning the bill or asserting their belief that politicians should be making it "easier, not harder, for Americans to exercise their right to vote". A group of 72 Black corporate executives, hailing from companies such as Merck & Co., Ariel Investments, and Citigroup, issued a letter calling on companies to fight the restrictive voting bills being advanced by Republicans across the United States. Republican lawmakers responded by castigating the companies, with Senator Marco Rubio decrying them as "woke corporate hypocrites". Former president Donald Trump, who was the central promoter of claims of widespread election fraud and the principal agent in attempts to overturn the 2020 United States presidential election, called for Republicans and conservatives to boycott Major League Baseball, Coca-Cola, Delta Air Lines, JPMorgan Chase, ViacomCBS, Citigroup, Cisco, UPS, Merck & Co., and other companies he accused of being "woke".

Actor Will Smith and director Antoine Fuqua announced in a joint statement that production of their upcoming film, Emancipation, would be pulled from Georgia due to the passage of the law. Their statement read: "We cannot in good conscience provide economic support to a government that enacts regressive voting laws that are designed to restrict voter access." Filmmaker Ryan Coogler said that he would keep the production of Black Panther: Wakanda Forever in the state whilst objecting to the law.

On April 14, hundreds of corporations, executives, and celebrities opposed the voting restrictions in 2-page ad spreads in The New York Times, The Washington Post and some other major newspapers.

== Impact on 2022 midterm elections ==
In May 2022, the first election since the law's passing, early voter turnout was up 212% from the previous election as early voting for primary elections began, which undercut predictions that the law would lead to a falloff in voting. Defenders of the law criticized allegations that the law suppresses voters and touted measures like expanded early-voting hours in the law. Voting rights groups and Democrats said they changed their strategies to mobilize voters. One group, founded by Abrams, said their internal analysis showed a chilling effect on absentee ballots.

Similarly to the primary election, Georgia experienced record numbers of early voting turnout during the general election in November 2022 and the senate runoff election in December 2022.

After the election cycle, polling conducted by the University of Georgia on Georgia voters found that 99% of those who voted in the midterms reported no problems voting. 90% reported being very or somewhat confident that their ballot was counted. Less than 5% of voters reported waiting over 30 minutes to cast ballots, while 75% of voters reported waiting less than 10 minutes. Over 90% of voters felt it was "easy" to cast their ballot, and 95% had "excellent" or "good" voting experiences. 0% of Black voters reported having a "poor" experience voting, with over 95% reporting "excellent or "good" voting experiences. Over 84% of Black voters agreed with the statement that it is "easy to cast a ballot" in Georgia.

== See also ==
- Electoral integrity
- Voter suppression in the United States
- Voting Rights Act of Virginia
