= Burke Day =

American politician

Cecil Burke Day, Jr.

Member of the Georgia House of Representatives from the 153th district
- In office January 1995 – January 2003
- Preceded by: Eric Johnson

Member of the Georgia House of Representatives from the 126th district
- In office January 2003 – January 10, 2005
- Succeeded by: David Knight

Member of the Georgia House of Representatives from the 163th district
- In office January 2005 – January 2010
- Succeeded by: Ben Watson

Member of the Tybee Island City Council
- In office 1991–1994

Personal details
- Born: April 12, 1954 Jacksonville, North Carolina, U.S.
- Died: March 5, 2017 (aged 62) Tybee Island, Georgia, U.S.
- Resting place: Arlington Memorial Park, Sandy Springs, Georgia, U.S.
- Party: Republican
- Spouse: Sally
- Children: 3
- Education: Mercer University
- Occupation: Politician, author

Burke Day (April 12, 1954 – March 5, 2017) was an American politician and author.

== Early life and education ==
Cecil Burke Day, Jr was born in Jacksonville, North Carolina to Cecil B. Day and Marian (Deen) Uldine Smith Day. One of four sons born to the couple. His father was a real estate developer, and founder of the Days Inn motel chain. Young Day went to Mercer University in Atlanta, Georgia. He later moved to Tybee Island, Georgia, site of his father's first Days Inn, where he worked in real estate and investments.

== Political career ==
Day was first elected to public office as a member of the Tybee Island City Council. He served on the Council from 1991 to 1994. In 1994 he was elected to the Georgia House of Representatives as a Republican representing District 153. He took office in January 1995 at a time when his brother, Clinton M. Day, served as a member of the Georgia State Senate. Burke Day continued to serve in the Georgia House for 8 consecutive terms (16 years), until January 2011. Day served on the Appropriations, Defense & Veterans Affairs, and Public Safety & Homeland Security committees. He was chairman of Georgia’s Homeland Security and Public Safety. He was perhaps best known for the Stephens-Day legislation, which froze the taxable value of residential property at the time the property was purchased, protecting homeowners from being taxed out of their homes when property values went up.

== Later years ==
Day wrote a book about his father, who died at age 44. It tells the story of Cecil B. Day, Sr., and how he built the Days Inn motel chain. Day by Day: The Story of Cecil B. Day and his Simple Formula for Success was published in 2000. Burke Day died at his home in Tybee Island, Georgia on March 5, 2017, from complications of a stroke. Day also suffered from muscular dystrophy.
