= L.C. Myles =

American politician

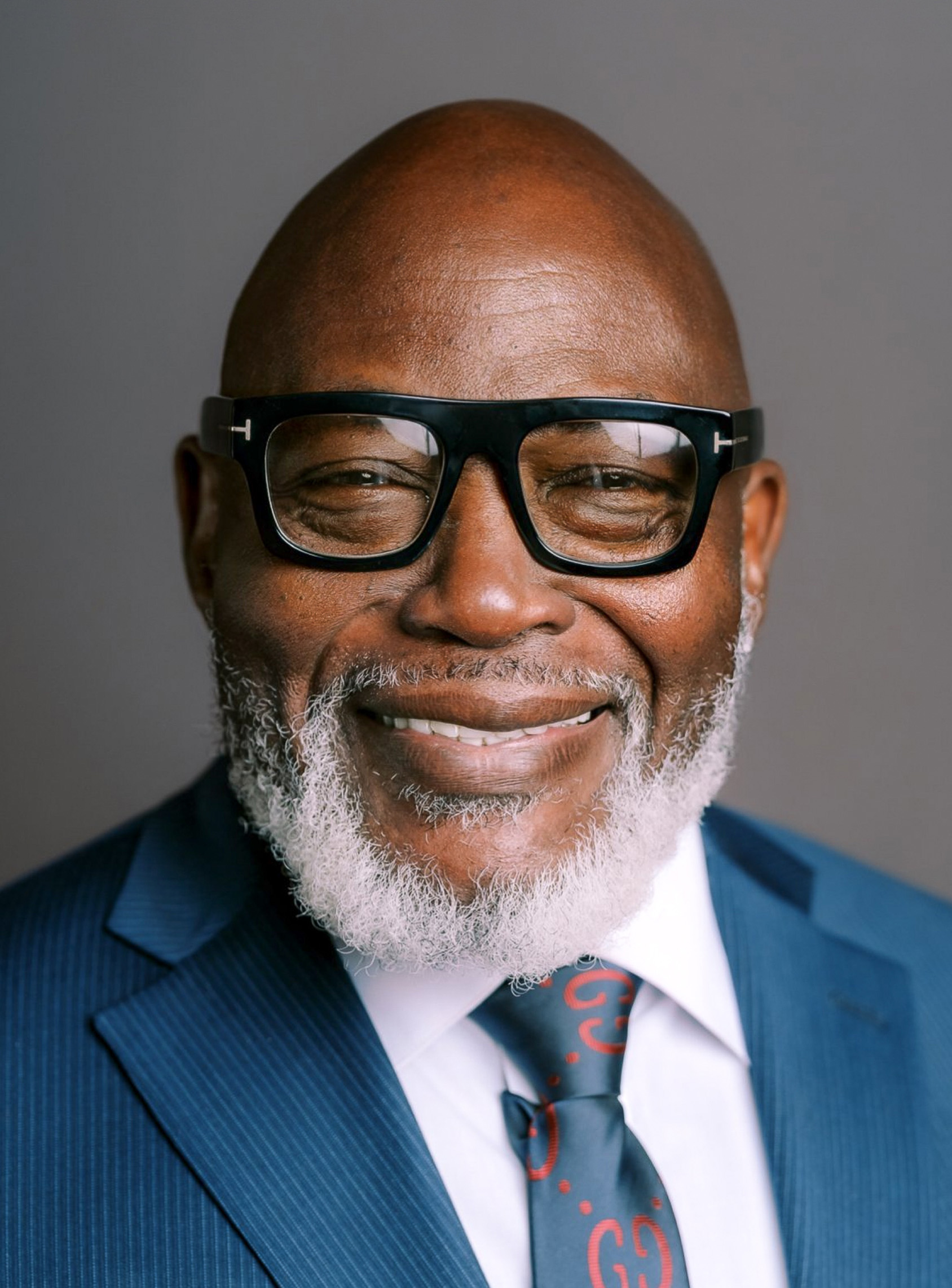

Member of the Georgia House of Representatives from the 126th district
- Incumbent
- Assumed office January 13, 2025
- Succeeded by: Gloria Frazier

Personal details
- Party: Democratic

L.C. Myles is an American politician who was elected member of the Georgia House of Representatives for the 126th district in 2024.

Myles is married to doctor Sharron J. Brown.
