= Houston Gaines =

American politician (born 1995)

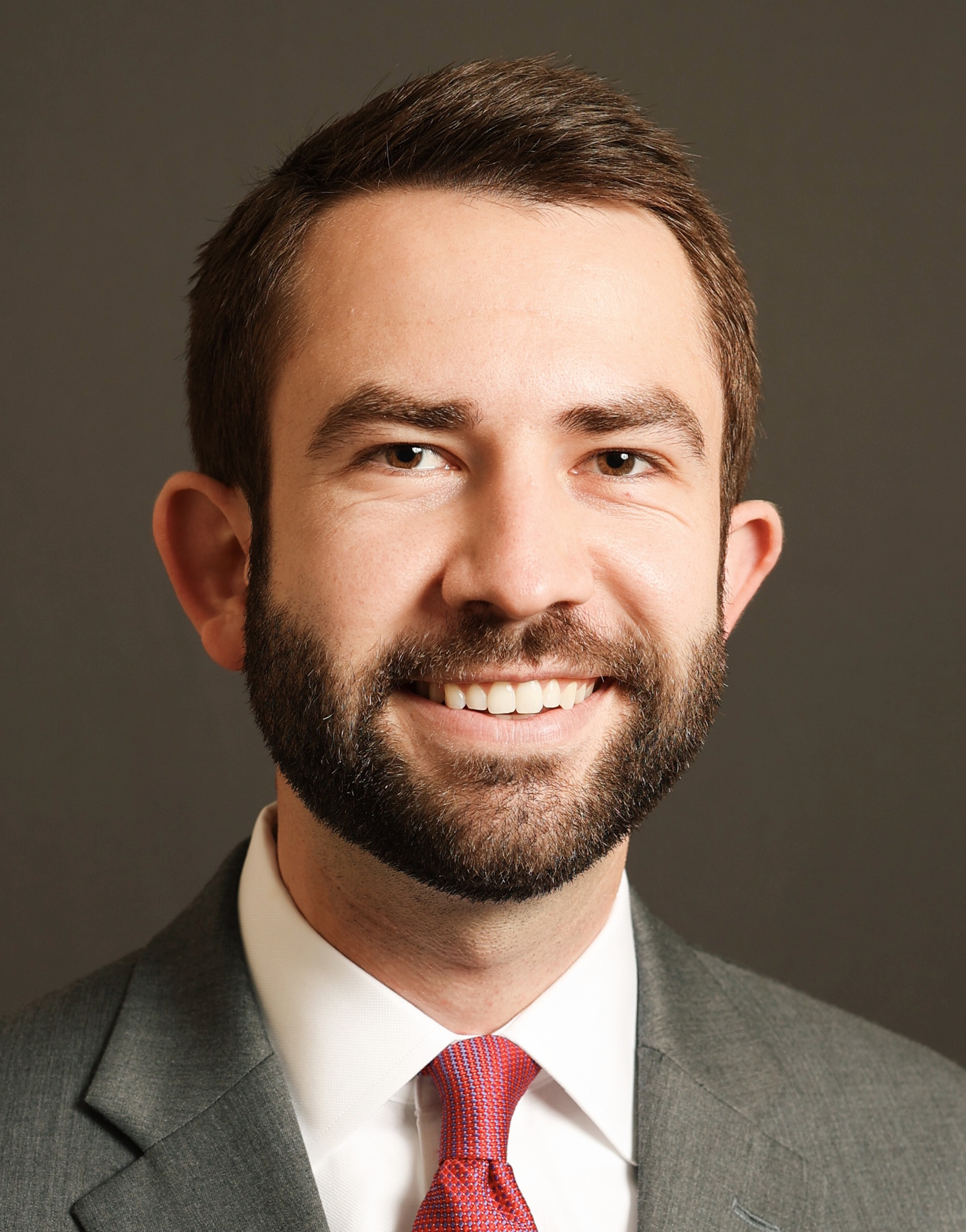
- Official portrait, 2025

Member-elect of the U.S. House of Representatives from Georgia's 10th district
- Assuming office January 3, 2027
- Succeeding: Mike Collins

Member of the Georgia House of Representatives
- Incumbent
- Assumed office January 14, 2019
- Preceded by: Deborah Gonzalez
- Constituency: 117th district (2019–2023); 120th district (2023–present)

Personal details
- Born: Houston Alexander Gaines; January 11, 1995 (age 31) Athens, Georgia, U.S.
- Party: Republican
- Education: University of Georgia (BA)
- Website: Campaign website

Houston Alexander Gaines (born January 11, 1995) is an American politician from Georgia. Gaines has been a Republican member of the Georgia House of Representatives since 2019.

In July 2025, he became the first prominent Republican to enter the race for the open U.S. House of Representatives seat in Georgia's 10th congressional district currently represented by Republican Mike Collins, who was the Republican nominee in the 2026 U.S. Senate election in Georgia.

In April 2026, President Donald Trump and U.S. Speaker of the House Mike Johnson endorsed Gaines in the Republican primary for Georgia's 10th congressional district.

== Early life ==
On January 11, 1995, Gaines was born in Athens, Georgia. Gaines' grandfather is the late Judge Joseph Gaines.

== Education ==
In 2017, Gaines earned a Bachelor of Arts degree in Political Science and Economics from University of Georgia's University of Georgia School of Public and International Affairs and University of Georgia's Terry College of Business. In 2016, Gaines served as the Student Government Association president, until 2017. During his time at school, he also served as the campaign manager for Athens Mayor Nancy Denson's ultimately successful campaign. As Mayor, Denson would later throw a fundraiser for Gaines's Republican State House campaign in 2017 and be subsequently removed from the local Democratic Party Committee.

== Career ==
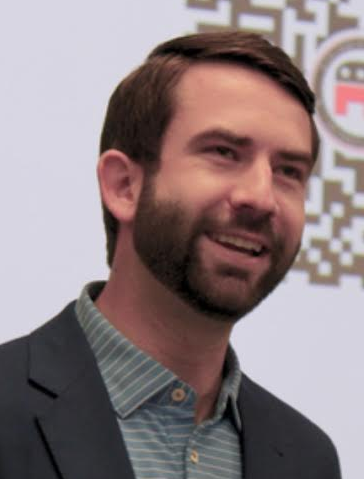
Gaines at a University of Georgia College Republicans event, 2024.

In 2017, at age 22, Gaines ran in a special election for the Georgia House of Representatives and was defeated by Democrat Deborah Gonzalez. On November 6, 2018, Gaines defeated Gonzalez in a rematch of their 2017 race and became a Republican member of the Georgia House of Representatives for District 117, winning with 53.55% of the votes. On November 3, 2020, as an incumbent, Gaines won the election and continued serving District 117. Gaines defeated Mokah Jasmine Johnson with 56.58% of the votes.

In the 2022 Georgia House of Representatives election he was redistricted to District 120. The 117th district was held by Republican Lauren Daniel.

In 2023, Gaines helped introduce legislation to create a panel that would give the state more oversight over district attorneys and make it easier for residents to recall prosecutors. Gaines pushed for the legislation following criticism that Athens-Clarke County District Attorney Deborah Gonzalez, who lost her state House seat to Gaines in 2018, was mismanaging her office, saying, “It is past time we take on rogue prosecutors in Georgia who are putting lives in danger every single day.” In May 2023, Georgia Governor Brian Kemp signed the bill into law, establishing the Prosecuting Attorneys Qualifications Commission (PAQC).

In 2026, Gaines along with another Republican candidate, Jim Kingston, received over one million dollars in campaign funding by Leading the Future super PAC backed by Andreessen Horowitz and Palantir co-founder Joe Lansdale.

== Awards ==
- 2019 Champion of Recovery. Named by Georgia Council on Substance Abuse.
- 2020 UGA 40 Under 40. Named by University of Georgia School of Public and International Affairs.

U.S. House of Representatives
Preceded by Mike Collins	Member of the U.S. House of Representatives from Georgia's 10th congressional district Taking office 2027	Elect
