= Barry Fleming =

American politician

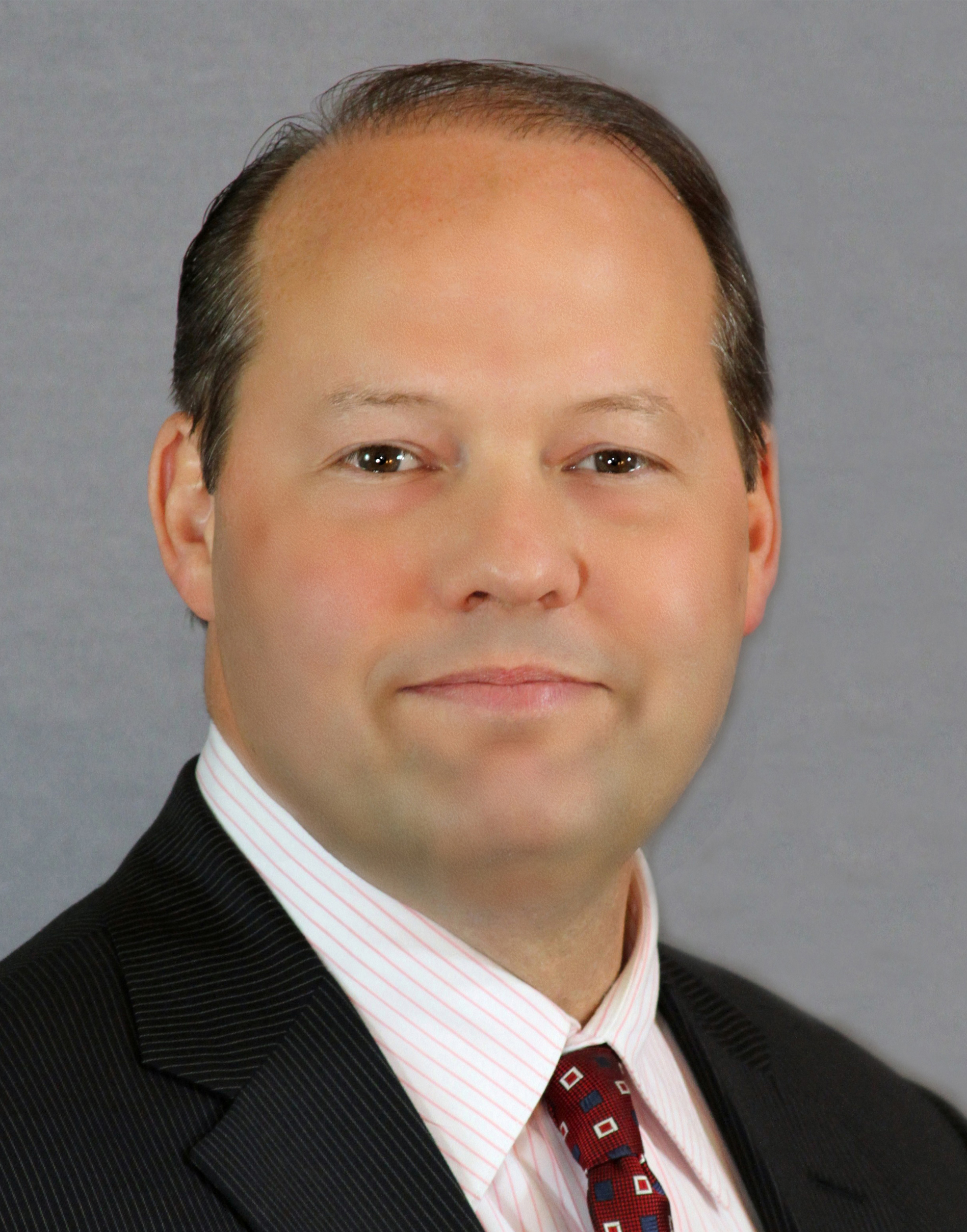
- Official portrait, 2021

Member of the Georgia House of Representatives
- In office January 14, 2013 – January 9, 2024
- Preceded by: Lee Anderson (redistricting)
- Succeeded by: Gary Richardson
- Constituency: 121st district (2013–2023); 125th district (2023–2024)
- In office January 13, 2003 – January 12, 2009
- Preceded by: Tom Rice
- Succeeded by: Lee Anderson
- Constituency: 79th district (2003–2005); 117th district (2005–2009)

Personal details
- Born: May 20, 1965 (age 61) Harlem, Georgia, U.S.
- Party: Republican
- Education: University of Georgia (BA, JD)

Barry Abbott Fleming (born May 20, 1965) is an American politician who served in the Georgia House of Representatives from 2013 to 2024. He previously served in the Georgia House of Representatives from 2003 to 2009.

In 2021, he introduced an election reform bill that would restrict voting access. Among its many provisions, it would restrict where ballot drop boxes can be located and when they can be accessed, require photo identification for absentee voting, shift back the deadline to request an absentee ballot, and limit early voting hours. Most controversially, it would restrict early voting on Sundays, when Black churches traditionally run "Souls to the Polls" get-out-the-vote efforts; according to The Economist, Black voter turnout is 10 percentage points higher on Sundays.

On March 10, 2021, Hancock County commissioners voted 4–0 to ask for Fleming’s resignation as the county's attorney because of his sponsorship of House Bill 531, which critics call a "voter suppression bill". The 2019 Census shows that "Hancock County's population is around 71% African-American" and 2020 election results showed Joe Biden won Hancock County with 71.7% of the vote versus 27.8% for Donald Trump.

Georgia governor Brian Kemp appointed Fleming to serve as a superior court judge on the Columbia Judicial Circuit on December 28, 2023. He was sworn in on January 10, 2024.

== See also ==
- Republican efforts to restrict voting following the 2020 presidential election
- Election Integrity Act of 2021

Georgia House of Representatives
Preceded by Tom Rice	Member of the Georgia House of Representatives from the 79th district 2003–2005	Succeeded by Fran Millar
Preceded by Larry O'Neal	Member of the Georgia House of Representatives from the 117th district 2005–2009	Succeeded by Lee Anderson
Preceded by Henry Howard	Member of the Georgia House of Representatives from the 121st district 2013–2023	Succeeded by Marcus Wiedower
Preceded by Sheila Nelson	Member of the Georgia House of Representatives from the 125th district 2023–2024	Succeeded by Gary Richardson
