= Gary Richardson (Georgia politician) =

American entrepreneur and politician

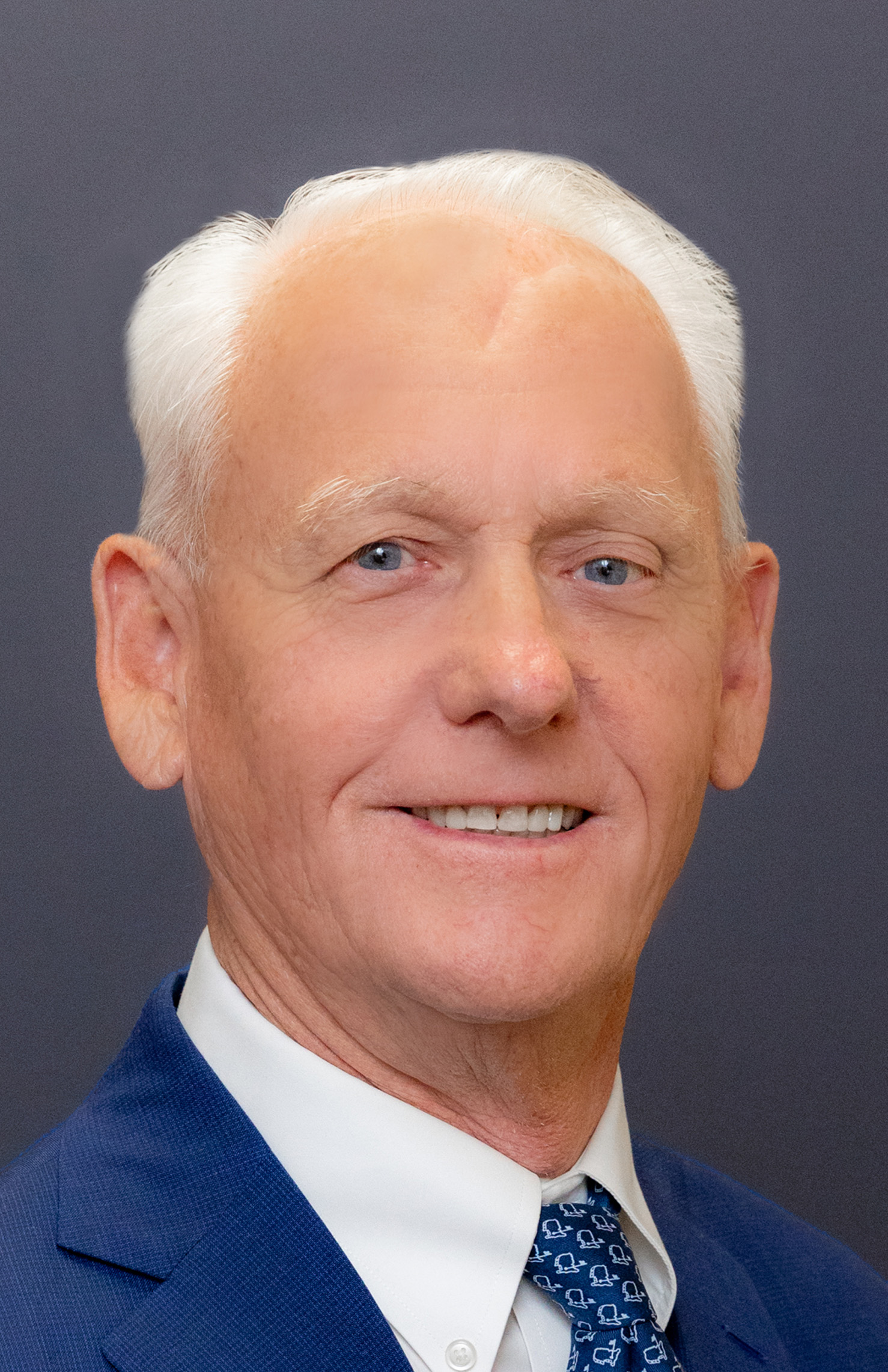
- Official headshot

Member of the Georgia House of Representatives from the 125th district
- Incumbent
- Assumed office March 20, 2024
- Preceded by: Barry Fleming

Personal details
- Born: Augusta, Georgia, U.S.
- Party: Republican

Gary Lee Richardson is an American entrepreneur and politician. He is a member of the Georgia House of Representatives for the 125th district. He previously served as a Columbia County commissioner for eight years. Before serving on the county commission, he was a member of Columbia county planning and zoning committee.

== Early life ==
Richardson was born and raised in Augusta, Georgia

== Georgia House of Representatives ==
Richardson ran in a special election for the Georgia House of Representatives's 125th district in 2024 to fill the vacancy left by Barry Fleming following his appointment to the superior court by Governor Brian Kemp. The first special election was held on February 13 in which Richardson won a plurality of the vote. Since no candidate won a majority vote, he faced conservative activist CJ Pearson in a second election on March 12. Richardson defeated Pearson finishing with over 60% of the vote to finish Fleming's term. He was set to face Pearson again in the May Republican primary, seeking a full term, but Pearson decided against running.

Georgia House of Representatives
Preceded by Barry Fleming	Member of the Georgia House of Representatives from the 125th district 2024–present	Incumbent
