= Georgia's 130th House of Representatives district =

State district in Georgia, USA

Georgia's 130th State House of Representatives district
Representative
Sheila Nelson; D–Augusta
- Demographics: 59.2% White; 33.7% Black; 4.7% Hispanic; 0.6% Asian
- Population: 53,157

District 130 elects one member of the Georgia House of Representatives. It contains parts of Richmond County.

== Members ==
- Debbie Buckner (2005–2013)
- David Knight (2013–2023)
- Lynn Heffner (2023-2026)
- Sheila Nelson (since 2026)
