= Lauren Daniel =

American politician

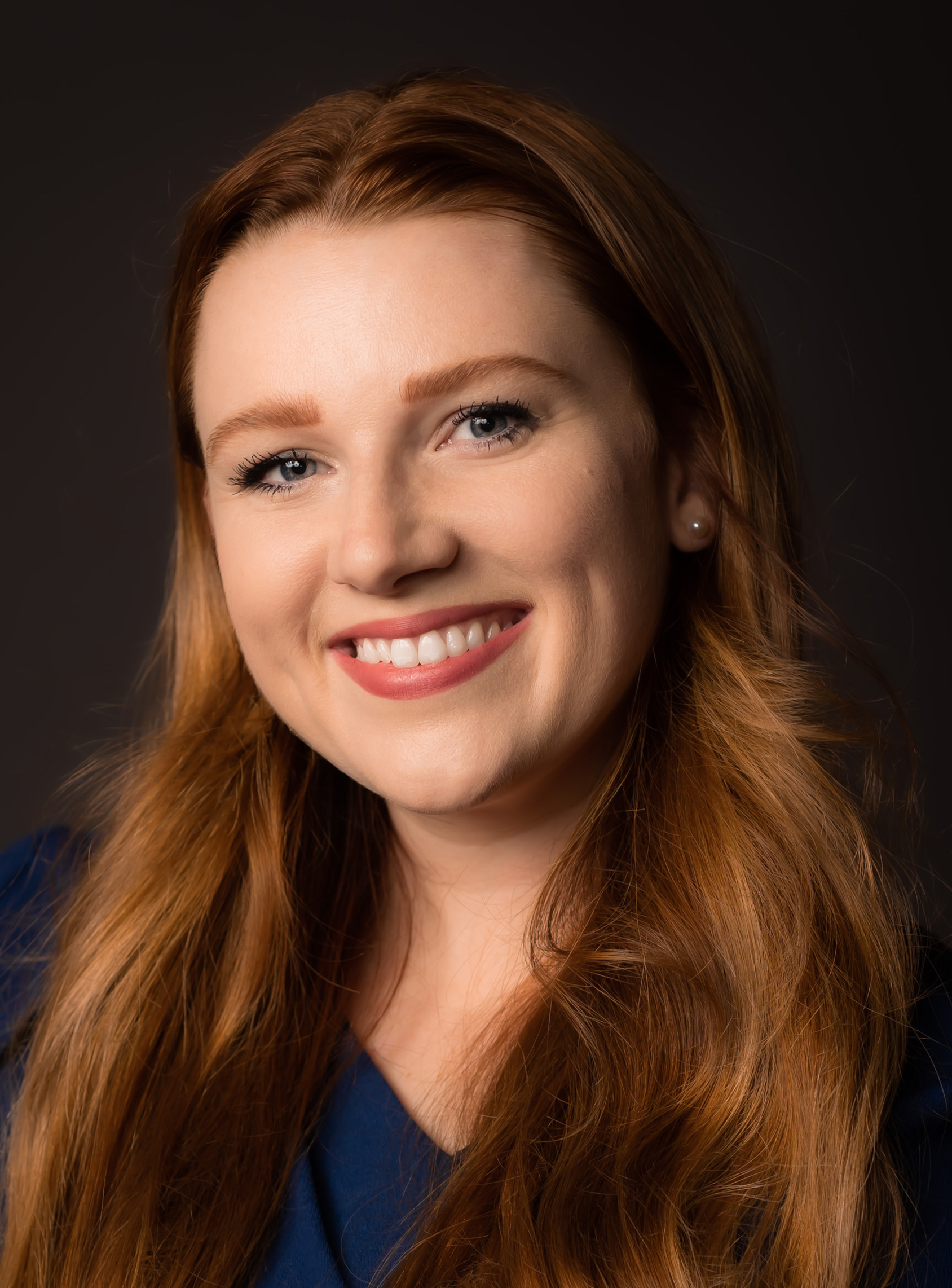

Member of the Georgia House of Representatives from the 117th district
- In office January 9, 2023 – January 13, 2025
- Preceded by: Houston Gaines (redistricting)
- Succeeded by: Mary Ann Santos

Personal details
- Born: September 21, 1994 (age 32) Locust Grove, GA
- Party: Republican
- Spouse: Zakery Daniel
- Education: Georgia State University

Lauren Daniel is an American politician who was a member of the Georgia House of Representatives from 2023 to 2025. Originally elected in 2022 to represent District 117 which encompassed parts of the Atlanta Metro and West-Central Georgia, she was heavily redistricted in 2023 to a district which was fully encompassed in Henry County.

She was a Georgia State Senate Candidate for District 18.

== Georgia House of Representatives ==
=== Tenure ===
Daniel was the youngest female member of the Georgia House and has worked on issues affecting families and mothers. Speaker Jon Burns tasked her with carrying priority legislation to increase the child tax deduction by $1,000 for each child in an effort to help parents combat the rising costs of family necessities. This legislation would garner national attention following a JD Vance interview with Face the Nation, in which he advocated to increase the national CTC by 150%.

Daniel became notable for her pro-life stance during the 2023 special session, during which she gave a speech about being a teen mother. She later would tell the AJC "I think sometimes our culture says that women can’t work and have kids, that you have to sacrifice one or the other. And that’s not what I believe.” During the 2024 Legislative session, Daniel introduced legislation to create a Maternal and Infant Health Commission to help fight the high maternal and infant mortality rates in the state.

In February 2024, Addy Pierce an 8 year old little girl was struck and killed by a vehicle illegally passing a school bus. Daniel introduced the bill that would become known as "Addy's law" that increased the fines and penalties for illegally passing a school bus and it would later pass and be signed by the governor.

In October 2024, Daniel along with Congressman Rich McCormick and State Sen. Ed Setzler, held a press conference refuting media reports on the deaths of two Georgia women following botched abortions. Daniel stated of Georgia's 6 week abortion ban "It does not limit care for miscarriages, and it provides exceptions for medically futile babies and in cases of rape and incest".

Daniel lost renomination in District 81 to Noelle Kahaian in 2024. Shortly before announcing for office, Kahaian told the AJC "We have a lot of purple people here" and "We have, frankly, a very large independent faction in Henry County that seems to be growing by the day, whether they’re leaving the blue side or the red side." Subsequently during the race, Republicans were urged to vote Democrat and Daniel told the AJC "I was a target. And ugly seemed to win this time. You name it, I was called it,” she said in an interview. “If I could sum it up, politics defeated a proven record. It didn’t matter compared to the narrative"

During the 2025 Legislative session, Daniel returned to the Capitol to defend Addy's law during an attempt to undo it by Rep. Don Parsons. She said "I hope the outcome of this is to raise awareness, number one, make sure that these representatives know from people throughout the state. All over, so I don't care where you live. If you live in middle Georgia, you live in the metro, if you live in North Georgia, reach out to your representatives, make sure that they know...you want to keep kids safe,”.

== Previous Endorsements ==
=== 2022 Election ===
Daniel was endorsed by Spalding county Sheriff Darrell Dix, State Rep. Clint Crowe and notable Georgia gun rights organization GA2A during her 2022 election per her facebook.

=== 2024 Election ===
During her re-election bid Daniel was endorsed in the Primaries by Frontline Policy Action, Gov. Brian Kemp, Congressman Mike Collins and the NRA Political Victory Fund.

== Personal life ==
Daniel is married to her high school sweetheart Zakery, the two have been involved in local politics since 2013. Daniel is the mother of four young children and has been known to bring her youngest son, Zane, with her to the legislature.
