= Georgia's 134th House of Representatives district =

State district in Georgia, USA

Georgia's 134th State House of Representatives district
Representative
Robert Dickey; R–Musella
- Demographics: 68.8% White; 17.0% Black; 6.8% Hispanic; 3.7% Asian
- Population: 57,178

District 134 elects one member of the Georgia House of Representatives. It contains the entirety of Crawford County and Upson County as well as parts of Lamar County and Peach County.

== Members ==
- Richard H. Smith (2013–2023)
- David Knight (2023–2025)
- Robert Dickey (since 2025)
