= Lee Anderson (American politician) =

American politician

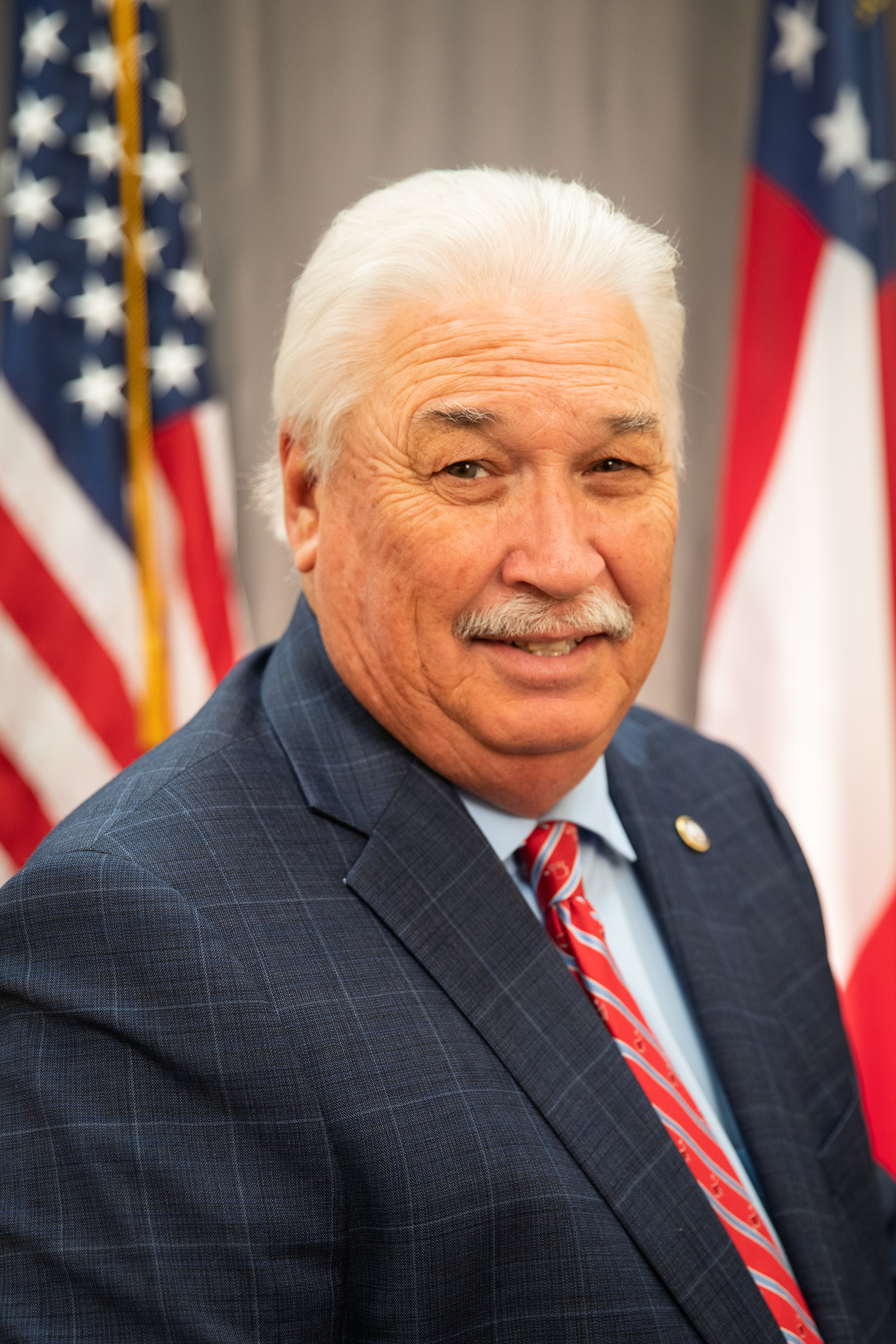
- Official portrait, 2023

Member of the Georgia State Senate from the 24th district
- Incumbent
- Assumed office January 9, 2017
- Preceded by: Bill Jackson

Member of the Georgia House of Representatives from the 117th district
- In office January 12, 2009 – January 14, 2013
- Preceded by: Barry Fleming
- Succeeded by: Barry Fleming (redistricting)

Personal details
- Born: Lee Ivey Anderson; January 6, 1957 (age 69) Augusta, Georgia, U.S.
- Party: Republican
- Spouse: Donna Robertson
- Occupation: Farmer, small businessman, politician

Lee Ivey Anderson (born January 6, 1957) is an American politician serving as a Republican member of the Georgia State Senate, representing the 24th district.

== Georgia General Assembly ==
In 2008, incumbent Republican state representative Barry Fleming of Georgia's 117th House District decided to retire to run for Congress and challenge incumbent U.S. Congressman Paul Broun of Georgia's 10th congressional district. Anderson decided to run here and won the Republican primary with 69% of the vote. He won the general election unopposed. In 2010, he won re-election to a second term unopposed.

In 2021, Anderson sponsored legislation to disband the Lincoln County Board of Elections and allow the Republican-led General Assembly to appoint a new board. Subsequently, the new board sought to remove all polling places except one. Anderson's district includes Lincoln County.

In January 2024, Anderson co-sponsored S.B. 390, which would withhold government funding for any libraries in Georgia affiliated with the American Library Association.

== 2012 congressional election ==
Anderson ran in the newly redrawn Georgia's 12th congressional district, held then by U.S. Congressman John Barrow (D-Savannah). Lee was endorsed by Georgia Right to Life and signed the Americans for Tax Reform Taxpayer Protection Pledge.

On paper, Anderson had a lot in his favor. The 12th had been significantly redrawn in redistricting, and now had a significant Republican tilt. Had the district existed in 2008, John McCain would have won it with 58 percent of the vote. By comparison, Barack Obama won the old 12th with 54 percent of the vote. However, on Election Day, Anderson lost, taking only 46.30% even as Mitt Romney won the district handily. According to a post-mortem editorial in the Augusta Chronicle, Anderson was almost invisible during the campaign. He never debated Barrow, and made only cursory appearances before the media.

== See also ==
- Georgia General Assembly

Georgia House of Representatives
Preceded by Barry Fleming	Member of the Georgia House of Representatives from the 117th district 2009–2013	Succeeded by Regina Quick
Georgia State Senate
Preceded by Bill Jackson	Member of the Georgia Senate from the 24th district 2017–Present	Incumbent
