= Teddy Reese =

American politician & lawyer (born 1980)

Tremaine "Teddy" Reese
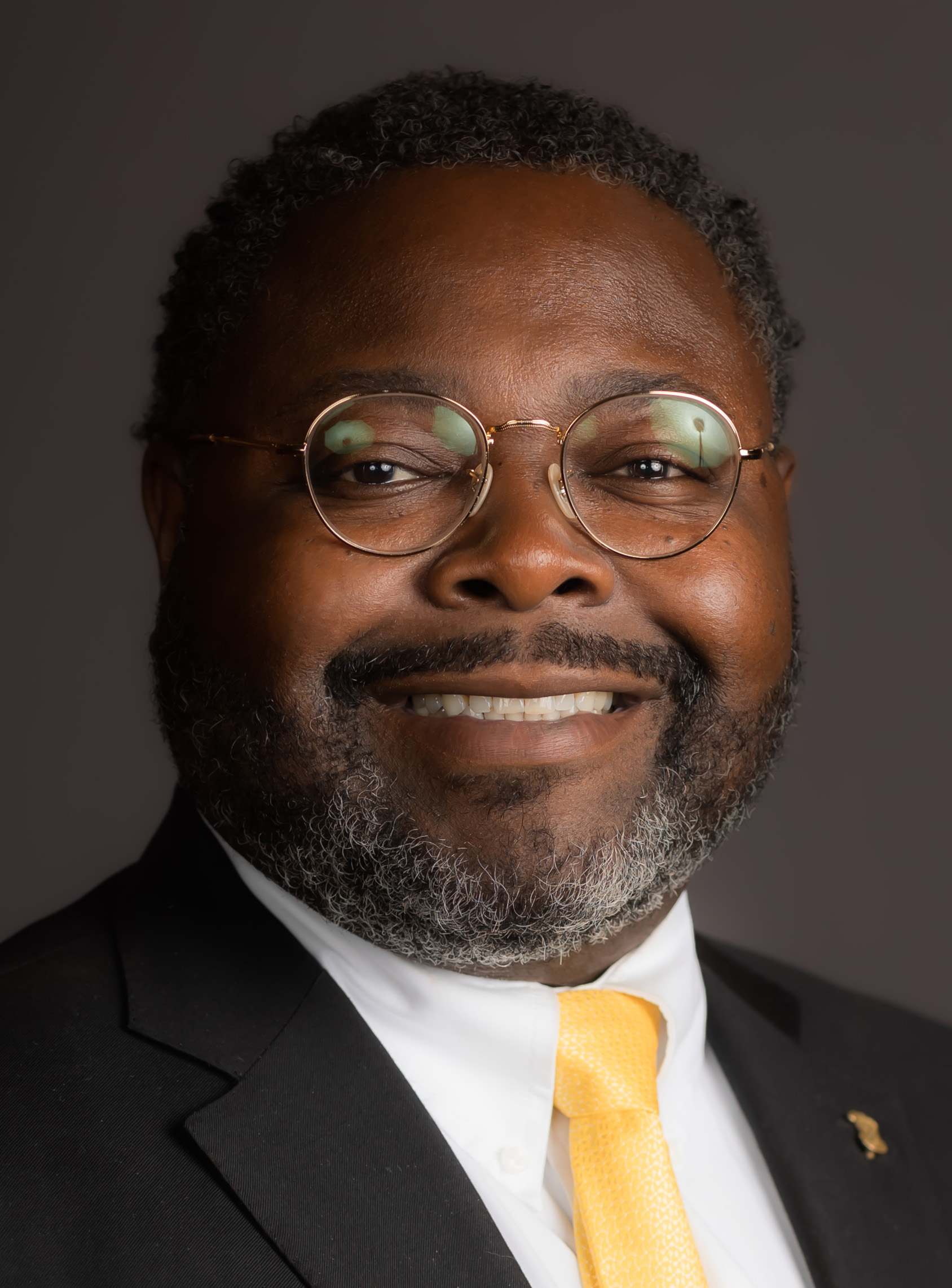

Member of the Georgia House of Representatives
- Incumbent
- Assumed office January 11, 2023
- Preceded by: Robert Dickey (redistricting)
- Constituency: 140th district (2023–present)

Personal details
- Born: August 28, 1980 (age 45)
- Party: Democratic
- Spouse: Chastity Reese
- Occupation: lawyer

Tremaine "Teddy" Reese is an American politician and lawyer from Columbus, Georgia. A Democrat, he was elected in 2022 to succeed Calvin Smyre in the Georgia House of Representatives. On March 5, 2026 Reese declared his intention to run for the Georgia Senate seat in District 15. Reese previously ran in 2016 for the at-large Seat 10 on Columbus City Council, losing to incumbent Skip Henderson.
