= Brilyn Hollyhand =

American political activist (born 2006)

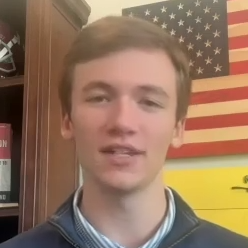
- Hollyhand in 2024

Chair of the Republican National Committee Youth Advisory Council
- In office May 2023 – September 2025 Serving with Kat Cammack, Mike Lawler, and CJ Pearson
- Chair: Ronna McDaniel; Michael Whatley; Joe Gruters
- Preceded by: Position established

Personal details
- Born: June 16, 2006 (age 20) Tuscaloosa, Alabama, U.S.
- Party: Republican
- Education: Auburn University
- Occupation: Political activist

Brilyn Hollyhand (born June 16, 2006) is an American political activist. A member of the Republican Party, Hollyhand served as the co-chair of the Republican National Committee Youth Advisory Council from May 2023 to September 2025.

Hollyhand established a political online-newspaper, The Truth Gazette, in July 2016. Through the Gazette, he became involved in politics, particularly in the affairs of the Republican Party. Hollyhand conducted interviews with local and national political figures. In May 2023, Republican National Committee chair Ronna McDaniel appointed Hollyhand as a co-chair of the committee's youth advisory council. After the assassination of political activist Charlie Kirk in September 2025, he embarked on a tour of college campuses.

== Early life and education ==
Brilyn Hollyhand was born on June 16, 2006, in Tuscaloosa, Alabama. He is the son of Leigh and Brian Hollyhand, a housing developer and a donor for the Republican Party, and has a younger sister. Hollyhand graduated from Tuscaloosa Academy in 2025. He began attending Auburn University that year to study political science.

== Career ==
=== The Truth Gazette (2016–2023) ===
Leading up to the 2016 presidential election, Hollyhand began developing an interest in politics and political news coverage. In July 2016, he founded The Truth Gazette, a political online-newspaper. In June 2017, Hollyhand established an email newsletter discussing national and Alabama politics. In April 2018, he served as a one-day Alabama Senate page for Gerald Allen and led the Senate in the Pledge of Allegiance. Hollyhand interviewed the state's attorney general, Steve Marshall; its secretary of state, John Merrill; and Allen that day; by July, he had interviewed including U.S. representative Robert Aderholt and Tuscaloosa mayor Walt Maddox. In August, he met the political activist Charlie Kirk, later speaking to him regularly. By that month, he had established a podcast, The Brilyn Hollyhand Show, and had interviewed Kirk and the commentator Candace Owens.

In January 2019, President Donald Trump invited Hollyhand to tour the White House and thanked Hollyhand for sending him letters. In December 2021, Hollyhand interviewed Texas senator Ted Cruz, in which Cruz stated that he was considering running for president in the 2024 election. He later interviewed the four White House press secretaries in Trump's first term; former vice president Mike Pence, whom Hollyhand asked if he was running for president in the 2024 election; House Minority Leader Kevin McCarthy; House Minority Whip Steve Scalise; Donald Trump Jr.; and Alabama senator Katie Britt. In May 2022, Merrill awarded Hollyhand the NASS John Lewis Youth Leadership Award for his political reporting.

=== Co-chair of the Republican National Committee Youth Advisory Council (2023–2025) ===
According to an interview with The Birmingham News, Hollyhand began meeting with Republican National Committee chair Ronna McDaniel to discuss establishing a youth advisory council in January 2023. In May 2023, he was named as a co-chair of the council. Hollyhand sought to host the third Republican presidential debate that year at the University of Alabama; a debate at the university was eventually held in December, Alabama's first presidential debate. He told The Wall Street Journal that he had advised Donald Trump to expand his social media presence to include platforms other than Truth Social, such as TikTok.

In January 2024, Hollyhand claimed to have presented chairman Michael Whatley and co-chairwoman Lara Trump with a proposal to invite influencers to that year's Republican National Convention, in an effort to garner younger voters. In May 2025, he opened a Trump fundraiser at Coleman Coliseum. In June, he joined Alabama secretary of state Wes Allen's campaign in the 2026 lieutenant gubernatorial election. The following month, Hollyhand published One Generation Away: Why Now Is the Time to Restore American Freedom. He told The Tuscaloosa News that he began working on the book in October 2023.

=== Further political work (2025–present) ===
By September 2025, Hollyhand had left the Youth Advisory Council. Following the assassination of Charlie Kirk, Hollyhand made at least eighteen appearances on cable news, according to The New York Times. He advocated for the University of Alabama to fire employees who spoke critically of Kirk's death. In an interview with Politico, Hollyhand expressed an interest in returning to Utah and continuing Kirk's tour of college campuses. In October, he announced a "One Conversation at a Time" tour in partnership with Kirk's organization, Turning Point USA.

== Views ==
=== Domestic issues ===
In an interview with NPR, Hollyhand described himself as the "bottom of the totem pole" for being a "white, straight male", and expressed concern that affirmative action would prevent him from getting into certain universities. He praised the Supreme Court's decision in Students for Fair Admissions v. Harvard (2023) rejecting affirmative action in college admissions. After the Alabama Supreme Court ruled in LePage v. Center for Reproductive Medicine (2024) that frozen embryos are legally minor children, Hollyhand agreed with the court's ruling. In October 2025, Hollyhand told Clemson University students that he was a critic of diversity, equity, and inclusion initiatives, that pornography is a "threat", and that the United States should have a "legal immigration" option.

=== Political institutions and rhetoric ===
In January 2023, Hollyhand wrote in an op-ed for The Truth Gazette that the Republican Party faced a significant risk in losing younger voters, adding that the party had become excessively focused on critics such as former Illinois representative Adam Kinzinger and former Wyoming representative Liz Cheney rather than garnering additional voters. In July 2024, following the attempted assassination of Donald Trump in Pennsylvania, Hollyhand stated that politics had "gotten too hot". He condemned the Young Republican group chat leaks as "disgusting".

=== Foreign policy ===
Hollyhand has expressed support for Israel, framing his support as a religious imperative for Christians, as opposed to a geopolitical mandate. In October 2025, contrary to him stating that no nation should be receiving a "blank check" from the United States, including Israel and Ukraine, Hollyhand continues to support Republican policymakers that take millions from Israel through AIPAC.
