= Deborah Gonzalez =

American attorney and politician

District Attorney of the Western Georgia Judicial Circuit
- Incumbent
- Assumed office January 2021
- Preceded by: Brian Patterson

Member of the Georgia House of Representatives from the 117th district
- In office November 27, 2017 – January 14, 2019
- Preceded by: Regina Quick
- Succeeded by: Houston Gaines

Personal details
- Party: Democratic

Deborah Gonzalez is an American attorney and politician from Georgia. Gonzalez was elected as a District Attorney for Georgia's Western Circuit district on December 1, 2020, and is a former Democratic member of the Georgia General Assembly. She served as a state representative for Georgia House District 117 from November 27, 2017, until January 14, 2019.

== Legal career and political service ==
Gonzalez is a practicing attorney, with more than 20 years experience. Her practice has concentrated in the area of media and entertainment and social media and technology.

On June 10, 2017, Gonzalez announced her intention to run for District 117 in the Georgia House of Representatives. She subsequently won with 53 percent of the vote in a November 2017 special election. The vacancy in the seat was created when her predecessor was appointed by Georgia Governor Nathan Deal to serve as a Superior Court Judge.

In the November 2018 general election, Gonzalez was defeated in her attempt to win a full term when Houston Gaines reclaimed the seat for the Republican party.

On July 11, 2019, Gonzalez announced her candidacy to run for district attorney in the Western Judicial Circuit, which serves Athens-Clarke and Oconee counties, to succeed incumbent Ken Mauldin who announced his retirement effective February 29, 2020, 10 months prior to the end of his term. However, Governor Brian Kemp refused to announce by May 3, 2020, an acting replacement for the remainder of Maudlin's term, which under House Bill 907 (passed 2018) would delay the primary and election for the office to 2022. Gonzalez filed a federal lawsuit against Kemp and Georgia Secretary of State Brad Raffensperger over the law in order to force the special election to take place, with Judge Mark Howard Cohen of the District Court for the Northern District of Georgia ruling in Gonzalez's favor. The state appealed the ruling to the United States Court of Appeals for the Eleventh Circuit, who referred the case to the Georgia Supreme Court. On October 11, the Court ruled in Gonzalez's favor, finding that HB907 unconstitutionally allows the governor to appoint an acting district attorney to serve beyond the term of the prior incumbent rather than the remaining time left in the prior incumbent's term. The state relented and scheduled a blanket primary for the office for the November ballot.

A special election was held on November 3, 2020, and went to a runoff on December 1, 2020. Gonzalez defeated her opponent in the runoff, James Chafin, with 51.7% of the vote. She was the first Latina to be elected District Attorney in the state of Georgia. In 2024, Gonzalez ran for reelection, but lost to Kalki Yalamanchili. Her loss was attributed in part to her handling of the prosecution of Laken Riley's murderer, particularly her refusal to seek the death penalty against the killer on behalf of her personal opposition to capital punishment.

== Electoral history ==
2017 Georgia House of Representatives 117th district special election
Party	Candidate	Votes	%
Democratic	Deborah Gonzalez	3,999	53.15%
Republican	Houston Gaines	3,525	46.85%
Total votes		7,524	100.00%
Democratic gain from Republican			

2018 Georgia House of Representatives 117th district election
Party	Candidate	Votes	%
Republican	Houston Gaines	13,164	53.55%
Democratic	Deborah Gonzalez (incumbent)	11,418	46.45%
Total votes		24,582	100.00%
Republican gain from Democratic			

2024 District Attorney Election - Western Judicial Circuit
Party	Candidate	Votes	%
Independent	Kalki Yalamanchili	45,058	59.41%
Democratic	Deborah Gonzalez (incumbent)	30,781	40.59%
Total votes		75,839	100.00%
Independent gain from Democratic			
