= Lynn Heffner =

American politician

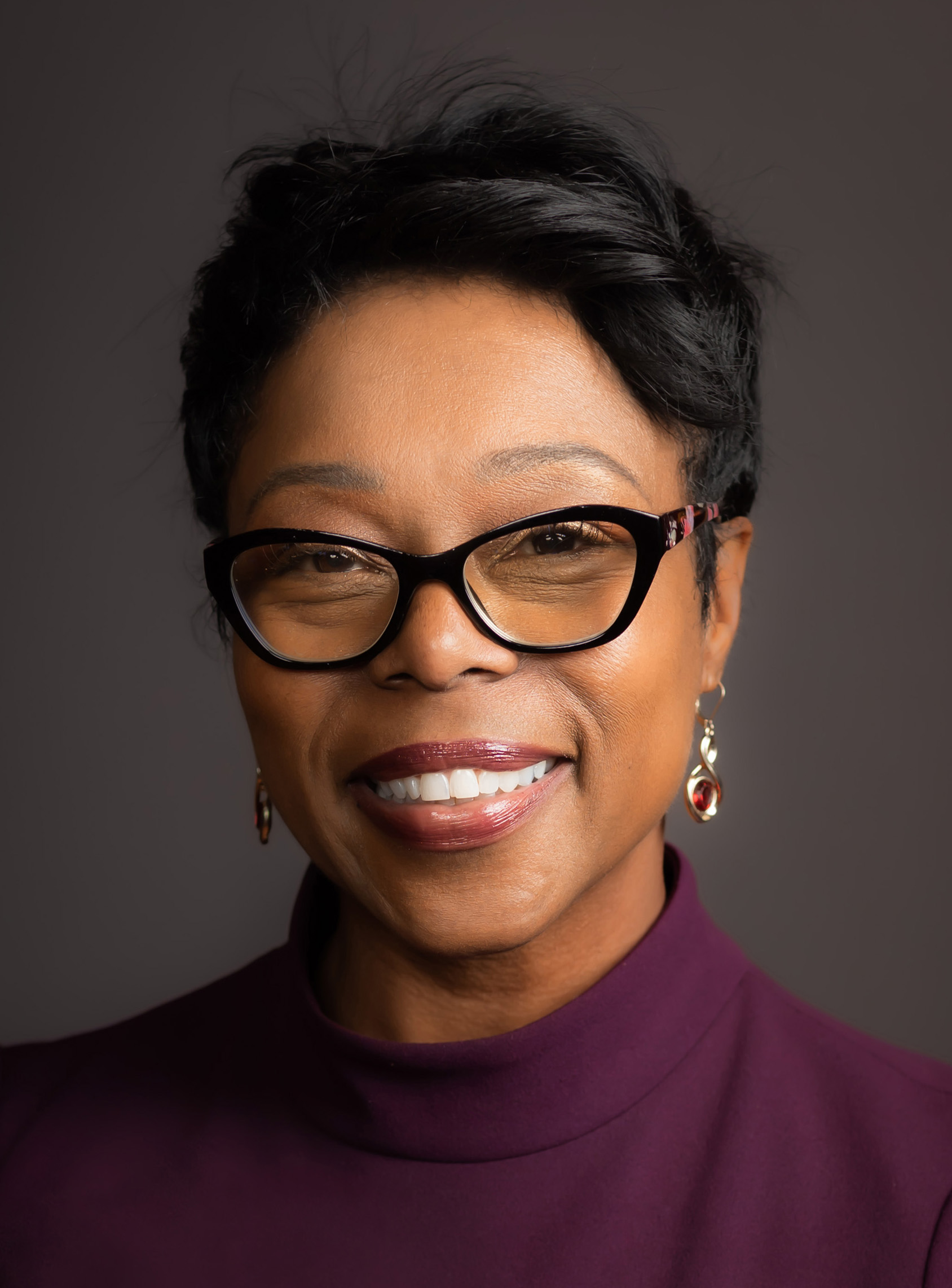

Member of the Georgia House of Representatives from the 130th district
- In office January 9, 2023 – January 4, 2026
- Preceded by: David Knight (redistricting)
- Succeeded by: Sheila Nelson

Personal details
- Born: Vallejo, California, U.S.
- Party: Democratic
- Education: University of Phoenix

Lynn Heffner (née Gladney) is an American politician from the Georgia Democratic Party who served as a member of the Georgia House of Representatives representing District 130.

Heffner sat on the House Defense & Veterans Affairs, Economic Development and Tourism and Intragovernmental Coordination committees.

In January 2026, Heffner announced her resignation from the Georgia House of Representatives.
