= Sheila Nelson (politician) =

American politician

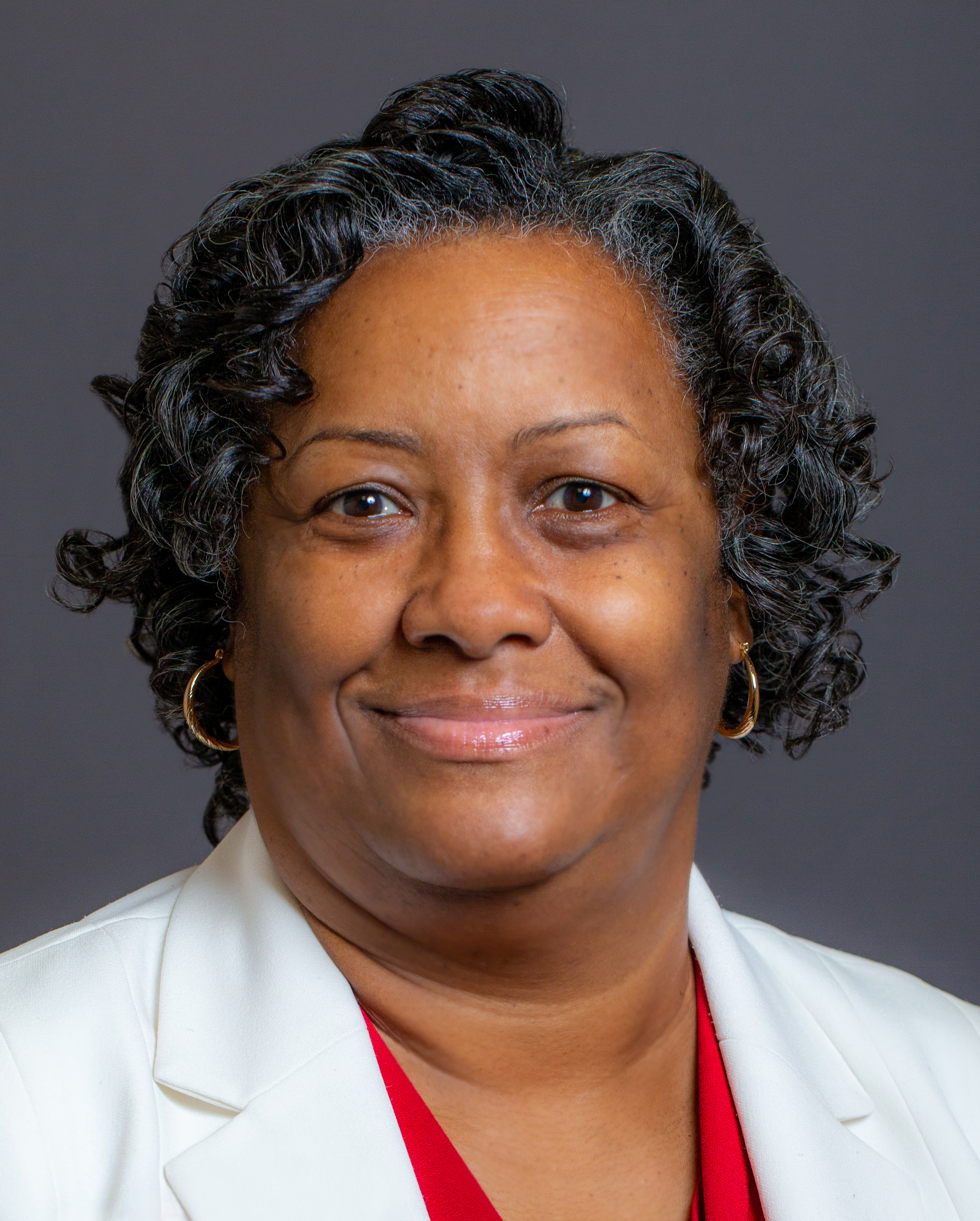
- Official portrait, 2019

Member of the Georgia House of Representatives
- Incumbent
- Assumed office April 16, 2026
- Preceded by: Lynn Heffner
- Constituency: 130th
- In office January 9, 2017 – January 9, 2023
- Preceded by: Earnest Smith
- Succeeded by: Lynn Heffner (redistricting)
- Constituency: 125th

Personal details
- Born: April 25, 1958 (age 68)
- Party: Democratic

Sheila Clark Nelson (born April 25, 1958) is an American politician who is a member of the Georgia House of Representatives for the 130th district. Nelson previously served as a Democratic member of the body from the 125th district from 2017 to 2023. The district includes parts of the city of Augusta.

Georgia House of Representatives
Preceded by Lynn Heffner	Member of the Georgia House of Representatives from the 130th district 2026–present	Incumbent
Preceded by Earnest Smith	Member of the Georgia House of Representatives from the 125th district 2017–2023	Succeeded by Barry Fleming
