= Gloria Frazier =

American politician

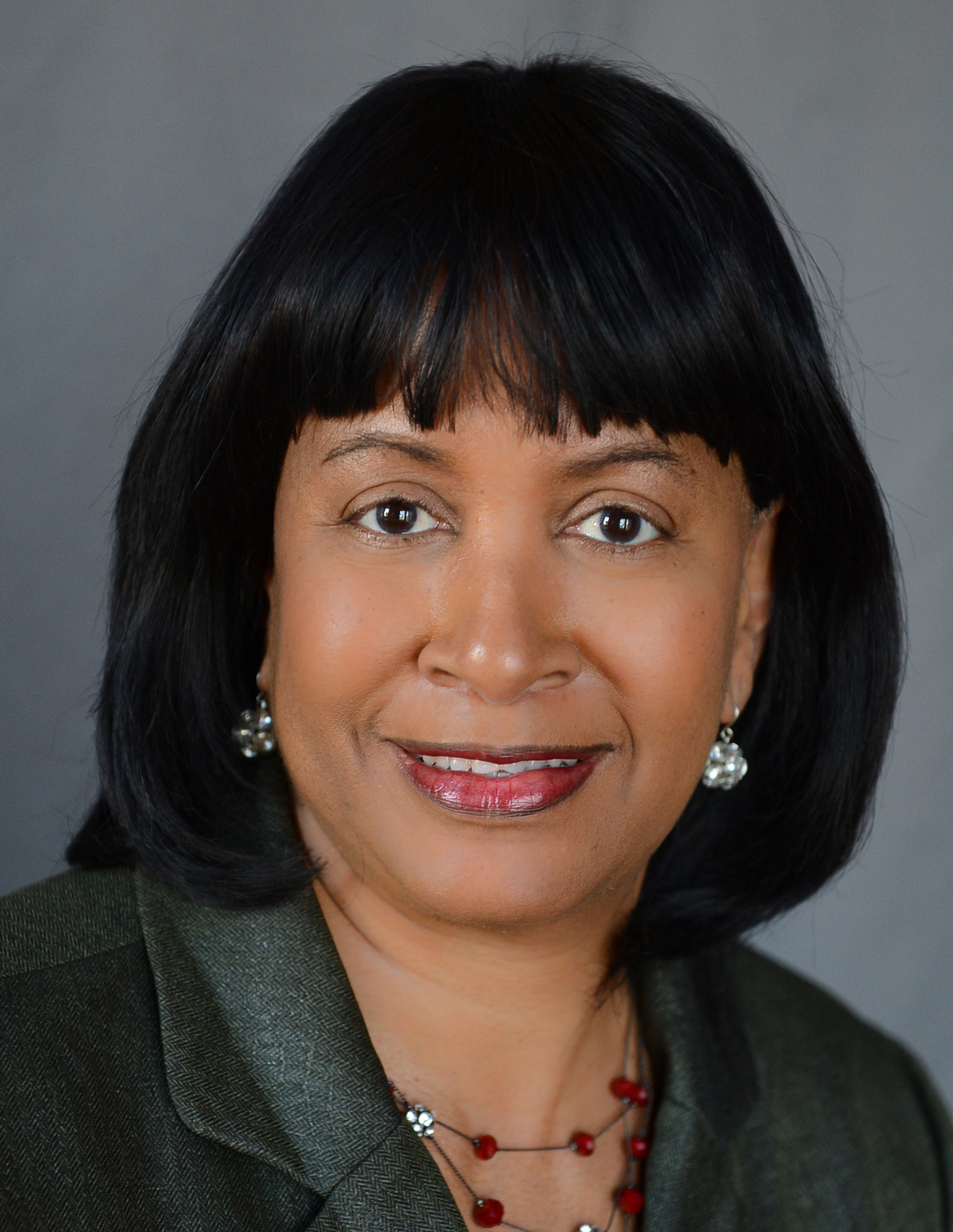

Member of the Georgia House of Representatives
- In office January 8, 2007 – January 13, 2025
- Preceded by: Alberta Anderson
- Succeeded by: L.C. Myles
- Constituency: 123rd District (2007–2013); 126th District (2013–2025)

Personal details
- Born: April 19, 1955 (age 71) Greenwood, Louisiana, U.S.
- Party: Democratic

Gloria Frazier (born April 19, 1955) is an American politician who served in the Georgia House of Representatives from 2007 to 2025.

Georgia House of Representatives
| Preceded by Alberta Anderson | Member of the Georgia House of Representatives from the 123rd district 2007–2013 | Succeeded by Barbara Sims |
| Preceded by David Knight | Member of the Georgia House of Representatives from the 126th district 2013–Present | Incumbent |
