= Jonathan Krohn =

American author (born 1995)

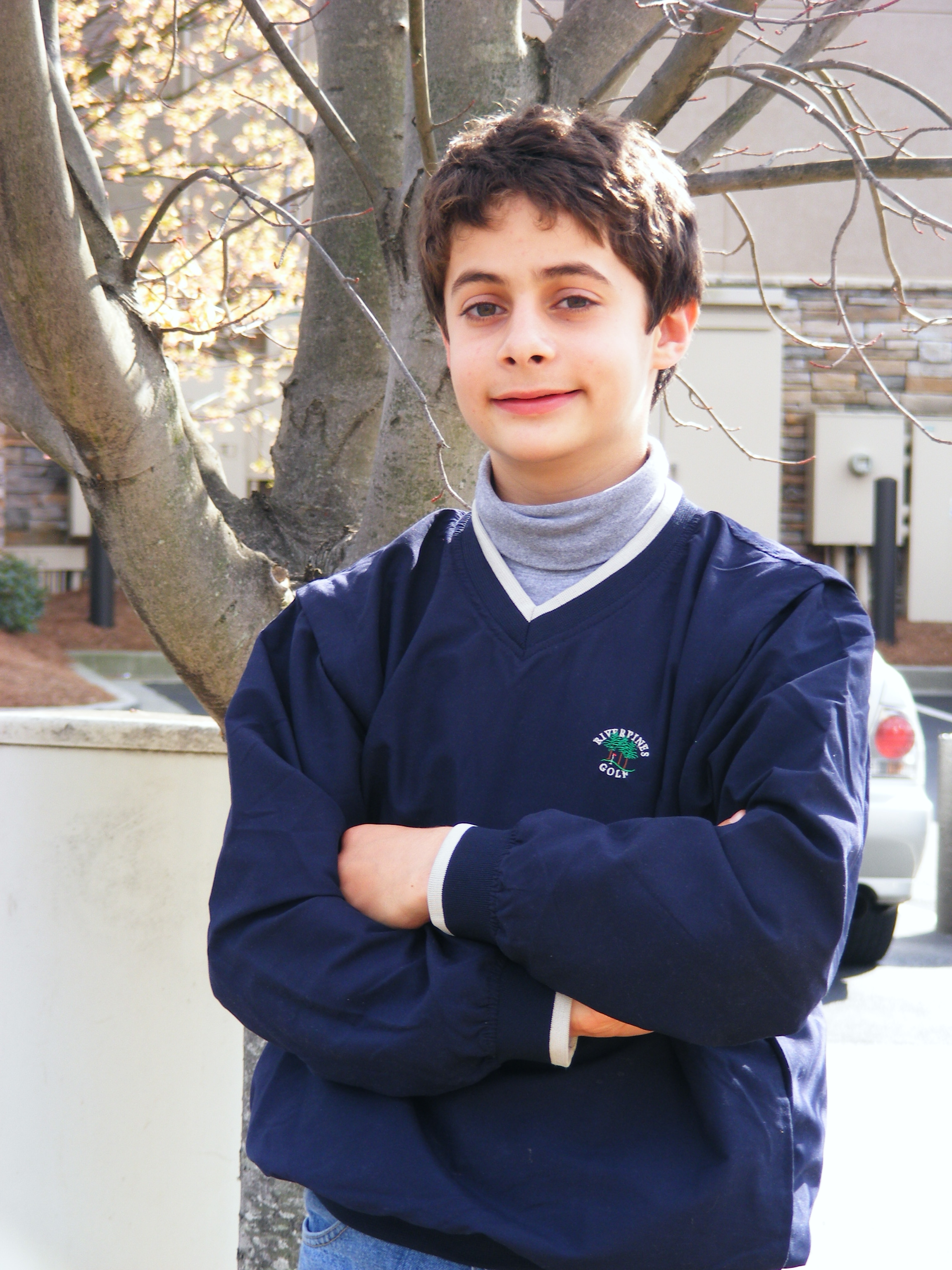
- Jonathan Krohn in 2010
- Born: Jonathan Lee Krohn; March 1, 1995 (age 31) Georgia, United States
- Occupation: Writer; Journalist
- Subject: International affairs, politics

Jonathan Lee Krohn (born March 1, 1995) is an American journalist and writer. He has written for The Guardian, The Atlantic, Salon, and Mother Jones, among others. In March 2013, Krohn was made the International Affairs and Politics fellow for Kurdish media company Rudaw's English language news site.

Prior to his work in journalism, Krohn wrote and self-published the book Defining Conservatism, in which he sought to outline core conservative principles. He gained national attention when he addressed the 2009 Conservative Political Action Conference (CPAC), at age 13. Krohn convinced skeptical organizers to allow him to speak for three minutes at the CPAC event on February 27, 2009. His speech was well-received by the audience and later gained popularity on the internet, garnering Krohn's attention on national news programs on CNN and the Fox News Channel. In 2009, he was a finalist for Time magazine's Time 100 for the year. His second book, Defining Conservatism: The Principles That Will Bring Our Country Back, was released on February 9, 2010.

In 2011, Krohn openly declared he no longer held conservative views, a change he attributed to his study of philosophers and maturing with age.

== Early life ==
Krohn, an only child, was born on March 1, 1995, to Doug Krohn, a computer system integrator, and Marla Krohn, a sales representative and middle-school drama and speech teacher. Krohn's family lived in Duluth, Georgia, and has been active in a Baptist church. In 2006, he was voted "Atlanta's Most Talented Child" by Inside Edition. Krohn became interested in politics at age eight, after hearing about a Democratic filibuster on judicial nominations in the United States Senate. The event prompted him to research American history and governmental rules and policies, and he developed an affinity for conservatism and began to listen regularly to conservative talk radio, particularly Morning in America with William Bennett, to whom he became a regular caller.

Krohn wrote Defining Conservatism, which was self-published in 2008, when he was 13 years old, because he felt the term conservatism was often misused. The book was in part a response to criticism that John McCain, the 2008 Republican presidential candidate, received regarding his conservative credentials. The book outlines four fundamental principles of conservative thought: support for the United States Constitution, opposition to abortion, less government, and more personal responsibility. Krohn went on to apply the principles to current events and define whether specifically cited actions violated those principles. The book was dedicated to Ronald Reagan, William F. Buckley, Jr. and Barry Goldwater, whom Krohn describes as his political heroes, along with South Carolina Senator Jim DeMint. Krohn paid to have the book published from his own savings. He described it as a "first effort" and immediately planned to write a second one, which he said would focus in part on Alexander Hamilton and James Monroe.

"He seems to at least have a historical perspective. But at 13, there’s not a lot of life experience yet. But as he attends more conferences, he’ll have more ammunition and education, and see that there are more than black and white viewpoints."

— Lisa De Pasquale, CPAC Director at the American Conservative Union

In January 2009, Krohn contacted organizers of the Conservative Political Action Conference and asked to speak at the event. Organizers were reportedly skeptical but gave him a three-minute spot on a panel about grassroots activists. He delivered the speech, on February 27, 2009, and described the conservative principles outlined in his book. When the speech was over, the panel moderator said, "Watch out, David Keene," referring to the chairman of the American Conservative Union. The next day at the conference, William Bennett said, "I used to work for Ronald Reagan and now I'm a colleague of Jonathan Krohn's!" The speech attracted the attention of national media outlets and became popular online. Sam Stein of The Huffington Post said of the speech, "It was filled with the type of rhetorical flow and emotional pitch one would expect from a seasoned hand. Except, [he] is more than four years away from being able to vote."

After the conference, Krohn's parents received hate mail accusing them of brainwashing their son, but both insist Krohn developed his own political thinking. Within a week of the speech, Krohn appeared on numerous TV and radio shows. A staff member for a potential candidate for Georgia governor also asked to meet with him. Several Facebook fan pages were started for him, including one called "Jonathan Krohn 2032", a reference to the first year he will be eligible to run for President of the United States.

Krohn wrote a column for Human Events, a weekly conservative newspaper. Krohn wrote a second book, Defining Conservatism: The Principles That Will Bring Our Country Back, released February 2010. The book was praised by former Speaker of the House Newt Gingrich and syndicated radio host Mike Gallagher, who said of it, "Any time I am depressed about the state of the country or the future of the modern conservative movement, I consider two words: Jonathan Krohn." Gingrich offered to write the foreword for the book, but Krohn wanted it to be written by William Bennett. Krohn attended the 2010 Conservative Political Action Conference, but did not have a speaking role. Krohn also spoke at several Tea Party protests.

== Change in political views ==
In 2011, the French conservative media Nouvelles de France revealed that Jonathan Krohn was not conservative anymore. In 2012, he confirmed to Politico that he no longer considers himself a conservative, and in fact takes a liberal point of view on many issues, including same-sex marriage and the Affordable Care Act. He also said that if he were old enough to vote in the 2012 presidential election, he would vote for Barack Obama. However, he refused to describe himself as liberal, instead rejecting ideological labels entirely. Krohn attributes his change to reading works of philosophers such as Nietzsche and Wittgenstein. He said that he rejected social conservatism first, before rejecting other conservative viewpoints. Krohn stated that he had matured and described his 13-year-old self as "naive".

In a 2012 Salon article, Krohn was critical of partisan politics in general, and conservatives in particular, describing his conservative critics as "scorned right-wingers showing all the maturity of a little boy."

== Personal life ==
In 2018, Krohn came out as bisexual on Twitter.

== See also ==
- CJ Pearson – as a minor was also notable as a conservative activist
