= Mary Ann Santos =

American politician

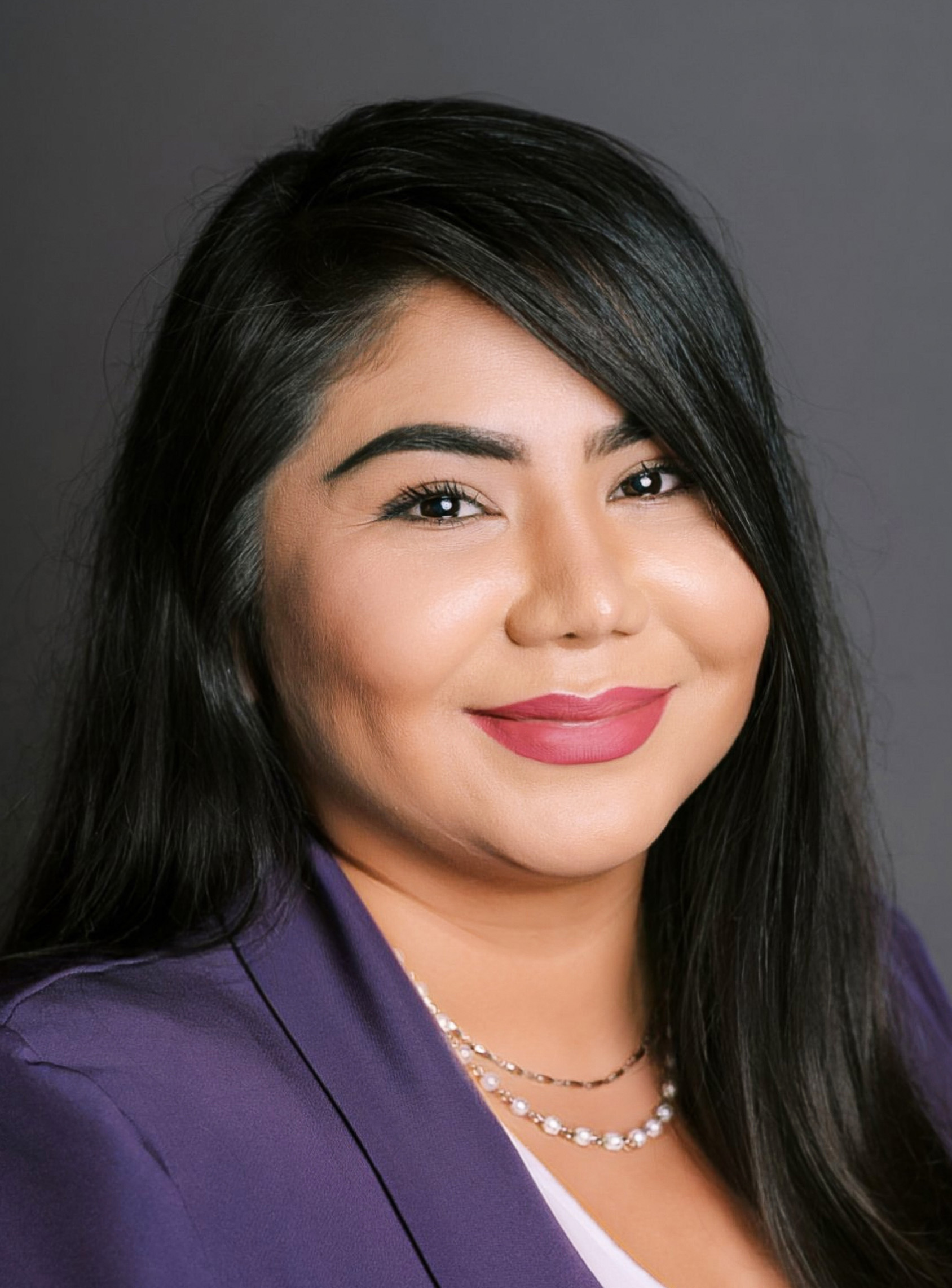
- Official portrait, 2025

Member of the Georgia House of Representatives from the 117th district
- Incumbent
- Assumed office January 13, 2025
- Succeeded by: Lauren Daniel

Personal details
- Born: November 4, 1985 (age 40)
- Party: Democratic
- Education: Mercer University (BS); Clayton State University (MPA)
- Website: Campaign website

Mary Ann Santos (born November 4, 1985) is an American politician who was elected member of the Georgia House of Representatives for the 117th district in 2024. In the 2026 Georgia House of Representatives election, she lost the Democratic primary to Kim Thomas Smith.

== Early life and education ==
Santos is of Mexican descent. She graduated from Mercer University with a Bachelor of Science in criminal justice, from Clayton State University with a Master of Public Administration, and was pursuing a Juris Doctor at Atlanta's John Marshall Law School as of January 2025. She is the single parent of two children.

== Georgia House of Representatives ==
In May 2025, Santos disclosed she was a survivor of domestic violence while supporting Republican state representative Stan Gunter's Georgia Survivors Justice Act.

In March 2026, Santos voted against a bill which would allow voters to decide to legalize sports betting in a statewide referendum. Later in the year, the sports betting industry collectively spent $311,000 opposing Santos in her re-election bid and supporting challenger Kim Thomas Smith in the Democratic primary election. Santos ultimately lost to Thomas Smith in a landslide, being defeated with 12.2% of the vote in the June 2026 primary run-off election.
