= Georgia's 140th House of Representatives district =

State district in Georgia, USA

Georgia's 140th State House of Representatives district
Representative
| Teddy Reese; D–Columbus |
- Demographics: 57.2% White; 34.4% Black; 4.9% Hispanic; 1.7% Asian
- Population: 55,239

District 140 elects one member of the Georgia House of Representatives. It contains parts of Muscogee County.

== Members ==
- Robert Dickey (2011–2023)
- Teddy Reese (since 2023)
