= Robert Dickey (American politician) =

American politician from Georgia

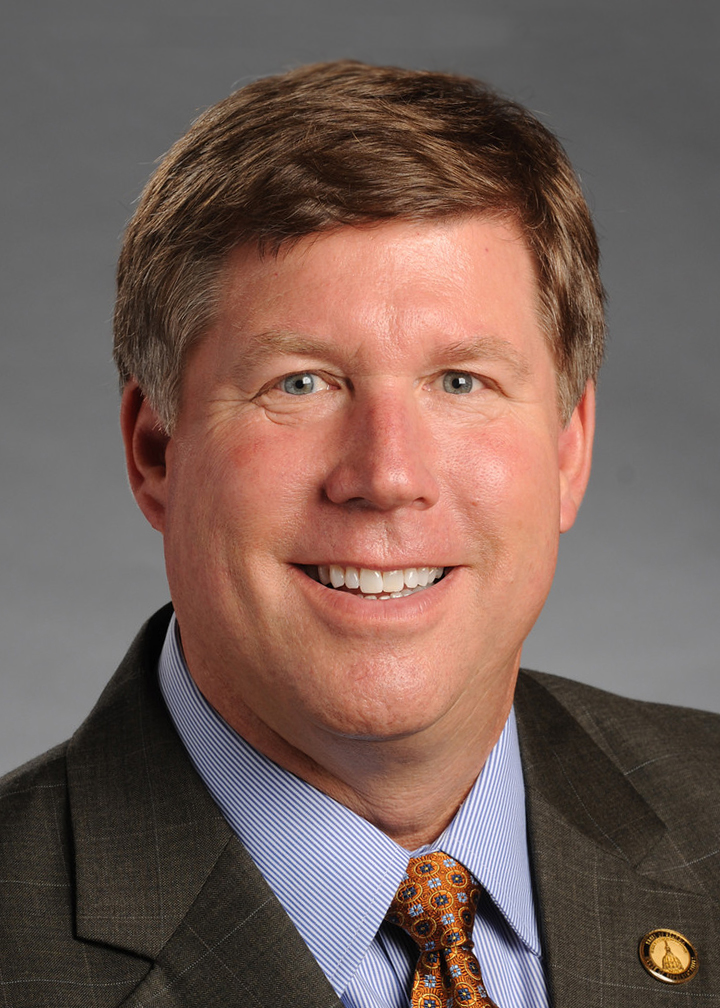
- Official headshot

Member of the Georgia House of Representatives
- Incumbent
- Assumed office February 23, 2011
- Preceded by: James Epps
- Constituency: 140th District (2011–2023); 145th District (2023–2025); 134th District (2025–Present)

Personal details
- Born: Robert Lee Dickey; November 26, 1953 (age 72)
- Party: Republican
- Spouse: Cynde
- Children: 2
- Education: University of Georgia; Georgia College
- Occupation: Agribusiness/Peach Grower

Robert Lee Dickey (born November 26, 1953) is an American politician. He is a Republican representing District 134 in the Georgia House of Representatives.

== Political career ==
In 2011, Dickey won a special election to represent District 140 in the Georgia House of Representatives, and has been unopposed every election since then. He was re-elected in 2020.

As of July 2020, Dickey sits on the following committees:

- Agriculture & Consumer Affairs (Secretary)
- Appropriations: Education Subcommittee (Chairman)
- Banks & Banking
- Energy, Utilities & Telecommunications
- Higher Education
- Natural Resources & Environment
- Ways & Means

== Personal life ==
Dickey holds a Bachelor's degree in Business Administration from the University of Georgia and an MBA from Georgia College. He owns Dickey Farms, a peach and timber farm, and, in 2019, Dickey was named the Georgia Farmer of the Year. He and his wife, Cynde, have two children.

Georgia House of Representatives
Preceded by James Epps	Member of the Georgia House of Representatives from the 140th district 2011–2023	Succeeded by Tremaine Teddy Reese
Preceded by Rick Williams	Member of the Georgia House of Representatives from the 145th district 2023–Present	Incumbent
