= Georgia's 125th House of Representatives district =

State district in Georgia, USA

Georgia's 125th State House of Representatives district
Representative
Gary Richardson; R–Evans
- Demographics: 34.6% White; 59.3% Black; 3.4% Hispanic; 0.5% Asian
- Population: 56,369

District 125 elects one member of the Georgia House of Representatives. It contains parts of Columbia County and McDuffie County.

== Members ==
- Sheila Nelson (2017–2023)
- Barry Fleming (2023–2024)
- Gary Richardson (since 2024)
