= Age of candidacy laws in the United States =

This article delineates the age of candidacy laws of the federal government and individual states of the United States. The US has historically had minimum age requirements for many positions, ranging from President to local members of city council. While there is no maximum age limit or point of forced retirement—other countries like Canada enforce retirement ages on judges and senators—there are term limits in some cases, most notably a limit of two full terms for the President of the United States.

== Federal government ==
Under the Constitution of the United States, a person must be aged 35 or over to serve as president. To be a senator, a person must be aged 30 or over. To be a Representative, a person must be aged 25 or older. This is specified in the U.S. Constitution.

The US Constitution does not specify an age requirements for one to serve on the Supreme Court.

There are no specified age requirements to serve in a presidential cabinet.

== State government ==
Most states in the U.S. have age requirements for the offices of Governor, State Senator, and State Representative. Some states have a minimum age requirement to hold any elected office (usually 21 or 18).

State	Governor	Upper house	Lower house	Lieutenant governor	Attorney general	Secretary of state	Treasurer
Alabama	30	25	21	30	25	25	25
Alaska	30	25	21	30	18*	N.A.	18*
Arizona	25	25	25	N.A.	25	25	25
Arkansas	30	25	21	30	18*	18*	18
California	18*	18*	18*	18*	18*	18*	18*
Colorado	30	25	25	30	25	25	25
Connecticut	30	18*	18*	30	18	None	18*
Delaware	30	27	24	30	None	None	None
Florida	30	21	21	30	30	None	25
Georgia	30	25	21	30	25	25	18*
Hawaii	30	25	18	30	None	N.A.	None
Idaho	30	18*	18*	30	30	25	25
Illinois	25	21	21	25	25	25	25
Indiana	30	25	21	30	18	18*	
Iowa	30	25	21	30	18	18*	
Kansas	25	18*	18*	25	None	None	
Kentucky	30	30	24	30	30	30	30
Louisiana	30	30	18	25	25	25	25
Maine	30	25*	21*	N.A.	None	None	
Maryland	30	25	21	30	18*	18*	
Massachusetts	25	25	18	18*	18	18	18
Michigan	30	21	21	30	21	18*	
Minnesota	25	21	21	25	21	21	
Mississippi	30	25	21	20	26	25	25
Missouri	30	30	24	30	None	None	
Montana	25	None	None	25	25	25	
Nebraska	30	21	N.A.	30	18	None	
Nevada	25	21	21	25	18*	18*	18*
New Hampshire	30	30	18	N.A.	18*	18*	
New Jersey	30	30	21	30	None	None	
New Mexico	30	25	21	30	30	30	30
New York	30	18	18	30	30	None	30
North Carolina	30	25	21	30	21	21	21
North Dakota	30	19*	18*	30	25	25	25
Ohio	18	18	18	None	18	18	18
Oklahoma	31	25	21	31	31	31	31
Oregon	30	21	21	N.A.	18	18	
Pennsylvania	30	25	21	30	30	None	None
Rhode Island	18	18	18	18	18	18	18
South Carolina	30	25	21	30	18*	18*	
South Dakota	21	21	21	21	None	None	
Tennessee	30	30	21	30†	18	None	
Texas	30	26	21	30	18	18*	18*
Utah	30	25	25	30	25	N.A.	25
Vermont	None	None	None	None	18	None	
Virginia	30	21	21	30	30	18*	18*
Washington	18*	18*	18*	18*	18*	18*	18*
West Virginia	30	18	18	N.A.	25	18*	18
Wisconsin	18	18	18	18*	18*	18*	18
Wyoming	30	25	21	N.A.	18*	25	25

* Qualified elector/registered voter requirement.
† State Senate membership requirement.
N.A. implies that such a position does not exist in that state.

=== Alaska ===
- Any public office: at least 30 (qualified voter requirement)

=== Arizona ===
- Any public office: at least 18

=== California ===
- Any public office: 18

=== Colorado ===
- Any public office: at least 21

=== Georgia ===
- Any public office: at least 18 (qualified voter requirement)

=== Hawaii ===
- Neighborhood Board Member: 18

=== Idaho ===
- Mayor: at 18

=== Illinois ===
- Comptroller: 25
- School Board Member: 18 (qualified voter requirement)

=== Indiana ===
- Mayor: 18 (qualified voter requirement)

=== Iowa ===
- Any elected office: 18 (qualified voter requirement)

=== Louisiana ===
- Treasurer: 25
- School Board Member: 18 (qualified voter requirement)

=== Maryland ===
- Circuit Court Judge: 30
- County Sheriff: 25
- Other county offices: vary according to local law
- Any public office: at least 18 (qualified voter requirement)

=== Massachusetts ===
- Most offices: 18

=== Michigan ===
- Governor or Lieutenant Governor: 30
- State Senate or State House: 21
- Judge: Licensed to practice law
- All other offices: 18 (must be a registered and qualified elector)

=== Minnesota ===
- Many offices: 21

=== Montana ===
- Mayor: at least 21

=== Nevada ===
- Any public office: 18 (qualified voter requirement)

=== New Mexico ===
- Most offices: 18 (qualified elector requirement)

=== New York ===
- Comptroller: 30
- State Senator: 18
- State Assembly:18

=== North Carolina ===
- Many offices: 30, 25, 21
- Nonpartisan municipal offices: 60 (qualified voter requirement)
- https://www.ncsbe.gov/candidates/filing-candidacy/general-candidate-requirements

=== North Dakota ===
- Mayor/council: 18 (qualified voter requirement)

=== Oklahoma ===
- State, county, and municipal public offices: at least 18 (qualified voter requirement)

=== Oregon ===
- Sheriff: 21
- Other county and local offices: 18
- Justice of the Peace: 18

=== Pennsylvania ===
- Mayors of Third-Class Cities: 18

=== Rhode Island ===
- Any elected office: 18 (qualified voter requirement)

=== South Carolina ===
- Judicial: 32

=== South Dakota ===
- Public Utilities Commissioner: 25
- Mayor/alderman: at least 18 (qualified voter requirement)

=== Tennessee ===
- Supreme Court Judge: 35
- Other state judges: 30
- County mayor/county executive: 30
- Sheriff: 25
- Constable: 21
- County School Board Member: 18 (registered voter requirement)
- State House of Representatives: 21
- State Senate: 30
- Governor: 30

=== Texas ===
- Any public office: at least 19 (qualified voter requirement)

=== Vermont ===
- Town officials: at least 18 (qualified voter requirement)

=== Virginia ===
- Any office: at least 18 (qualified voter requirement)

=== Washington ===
- Any office: at least 18 (qualified voter requirement)

=== Wisconsin ===
- Any city office: at least 18 (qualified voter requirement)

=== Wyoming ===
- Any municipal office: at least 18 (qualified voter requirement)

== Local government ==
Many states require elected municipal officers to be over 18 years of age or be a registered voter in the city thereof. Montana requires mayors to be at least 21 years of age.

As of November 2016, most U.S. cities with populations exceeding 200,000 required their mayor to be a registered voter in the city thereof or at least 18 years of age. Here are the following exceptions:

- 30 Years: Denver, CO; Honolulu, HI; Memphis, TN; Nashville, TN; St. Louis, MO
- 25 Years: Baltimore, MD; Colorado Springs, CO; Columbus, GA; Glendale, AZ; Kansas City, MO; Omaha, NE; Philadelphia, PA; Washington, DC; Westminster, MD
- 21 Years: Louisville, KY, Oklahoma City, OK; Aurora, CO; Minneapolis, MN; Saint Paul, MN
- 19 Years: Hialeah, FL (qualified voter requirement + 1 year of residence)
- No age minimum listed or implied: Pittsburgh, PA; Wichita, KS; Jersey City, NJ; Buffalo, NY; Yonkers, NY; Troy, NC
- Data unavailable: Birmingham, AL; Newark, NJ

=== Baltimore ===
- City Comptroller, and City Council President: 25
- City Council Member: 21
