= Georgia's 126th House of Representatives district =

State district in Georgia, USA

Georgia's 126th State House of Representatives district
Representative
L.C. Myles; D–Hephzibah
- Demographics: 32.4% White; 60.3% Black; 3.2% Hispanic; 1.0% Asian
- Population: 54,456

District 126 elects one member of the Georgia House of Representatives. It contains the entirety of Burke County and Jenkins County as well as parts of Richmond County.

== Members ==
- Gloria Frazier (2013–2025)
- L.C. Myles (since 2025)
