= Georgia's 117th House of Representatives district =

State district in Georgia, USA

Georgia's 117th State House of Representatives district
Representative
Mary Ann Santos; D–McDonough
- Demographics: 67.7% White; 16.5% Black; 9.5% Hispanic; 4.2% Asian
- Population: 56,669

District 117 elects one member of the Georgia House of Representatives. It contains parts of Henry County.

== Members ==
- Regina Quick (until 2017)
- Deborah Gonzalez (2017–2019)
- Houston Gaines (2019–2023)
- Lauren Daniel (2023–2025)
- Mary Ann Santos (since 2025)
