= Gwinnett County, Georgia =

County in Georgia, United States

- County
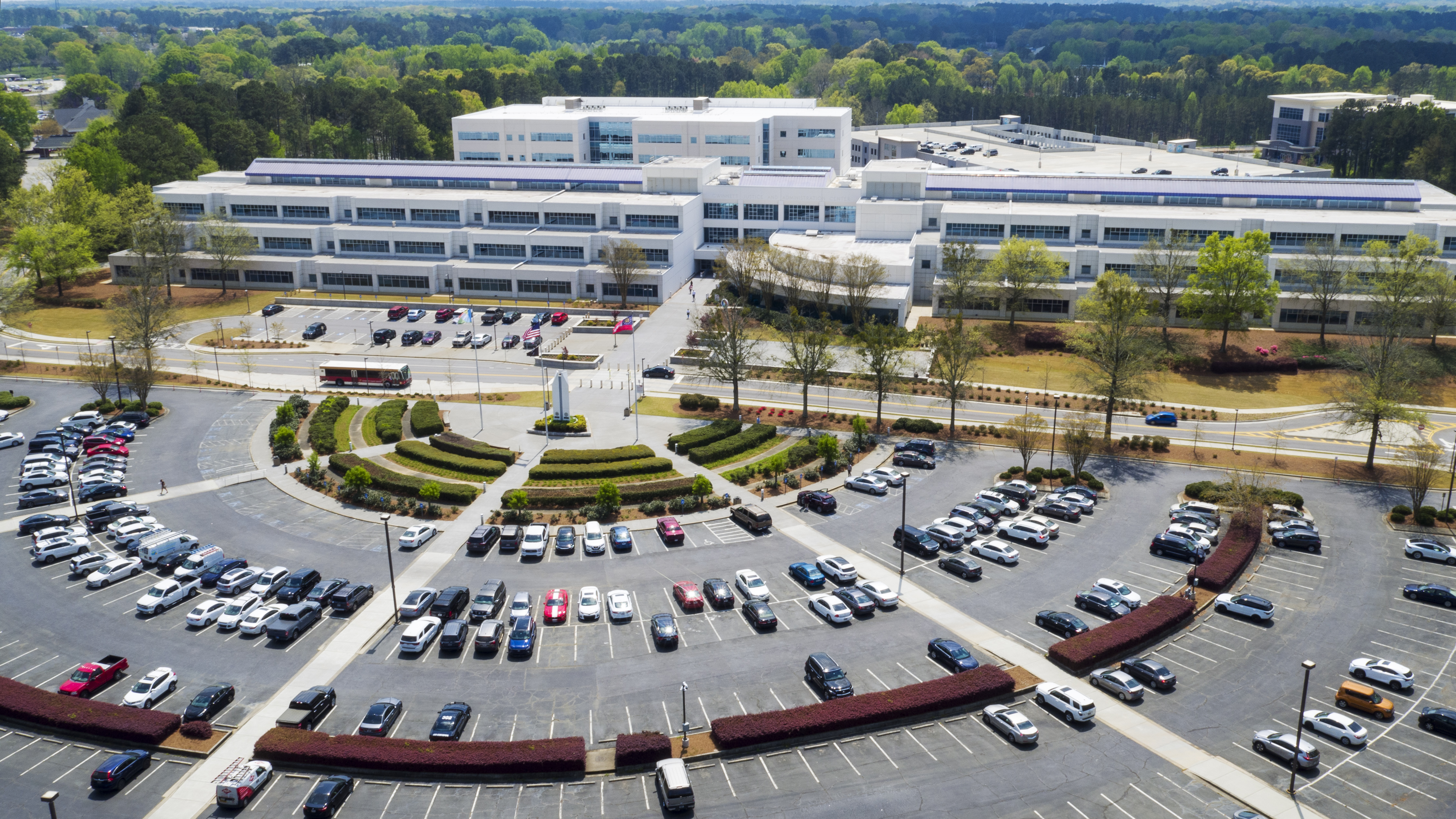
- Gwinnett Justice and Administration Center

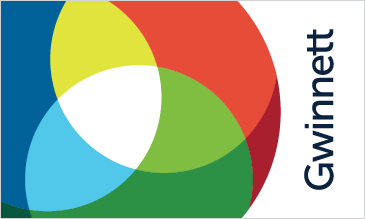
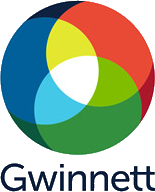
- Flag Seal Logo

- Location within the U.S. state of Georgia
- Coordinates: 33°58′N 84°02′W
- Country: United States
- State: Georgia
- Founded: December 15, 1818; 207 years ago
- Named for: Button Gwinnett
- Seat: Lawrenceville
- Largest city: Peachtree Corners

Area
  - Total: 437 sq mi (1,130 km^{2})
  - Land: 430 sq mi (1,100 km^{2})
  - Water: 6.4 sq mi (17 km^{2}) 1.5%

Population (2020)
  - Total: 957,062
  - Estimate (2025): 1,018,099 ▲
  - Density: 2,123/sq mi (820/km^{2})
- Time zone: UTC−5 (Eastern)
  - Summer (DST): UTC−4 (EDT)
- Congressional districts: 4th, 9th, 10th, 13th
- Website: gwinnettcounty.com

Gwinnett County (/ɡwɪˈnɛt/ gwih-NET) is located in the north central portion of the U.S. state of Georgia. It is a core county of Metro Atlanta, being located about 9 miles (14 km) northeast of Atlanta city limits. In 2020, the population was 957,062, making it the second-most populous county in Georgia (after Fulton County). Its county seat is Lawrenceville. The county is named for Button Gwinnett, one of the signatories of the Declaration of Independence.

Gwinnett County is the most diverse county in Georgia, with African American & Hispanic communities each representing over 20% of the county's residents, and Asian Americans at over 13%. As of the 2020 Census, no racial demographic constitutes more than a third of the county's population.

== History ==
In 1813, Fort Daniel was created during the War of 1812 in territory that would become Gwinnett County. The county was created in 1818 by an act of the Georgia General Assembly, Gwinnett County was formed from parts of Jackson County (formerly part of Franklin County) and from lands gained through the cession of Creek Indian lands. Named for Button Gwinnett, one of the signatories of the Declaration of Independence, the first county election was held at the home of Elisha Winn, and the first Superior Court was held in his barn. The county seat was later placed at Lawrenceville.

In 1831, a group of white men were tried and found guilty in Lawrenceville for violating Georgia law by living in the Cherokee Nation without a valid passport from the Governor. Two of the men appealed to the US Supreme Court in Worcester v. Georgia, which resulted in a ruling stating that only the federal government had jurisdiction over native lands, a decision which still stands.

In 1861, all three of Gwinnett County's representatives at the Georgia Constitutional Convention (1861) in Milledgeville voted against secession. Towards the end of the war, Union troops foraged in Gwinnett County as part of the Atlanta campaign. The Freedmen's Bureau was active in Gwinnett County during Reconstruction. In 1871, the courthouse in Lawrenceville was burned by the Ku Klux Klan in an attempt to avoid prosecution for their crimes, which included the shooting of a Black election manager in Norcross.

Early in the county's history, gold mining was a minor industry. The Gwinnett Manufacturing Company, a cotton textile factory, operated in Lawrenceville in the 1850s through 1865, when it burned. The Bona Allen Company in Buford, Georgia produced saddles, harnesses and other leather goods from 1873 to 1981.

The northeastern part of Gwinnett County was removed in 1914 to form a part of the new Barrow County.

== Geography ==
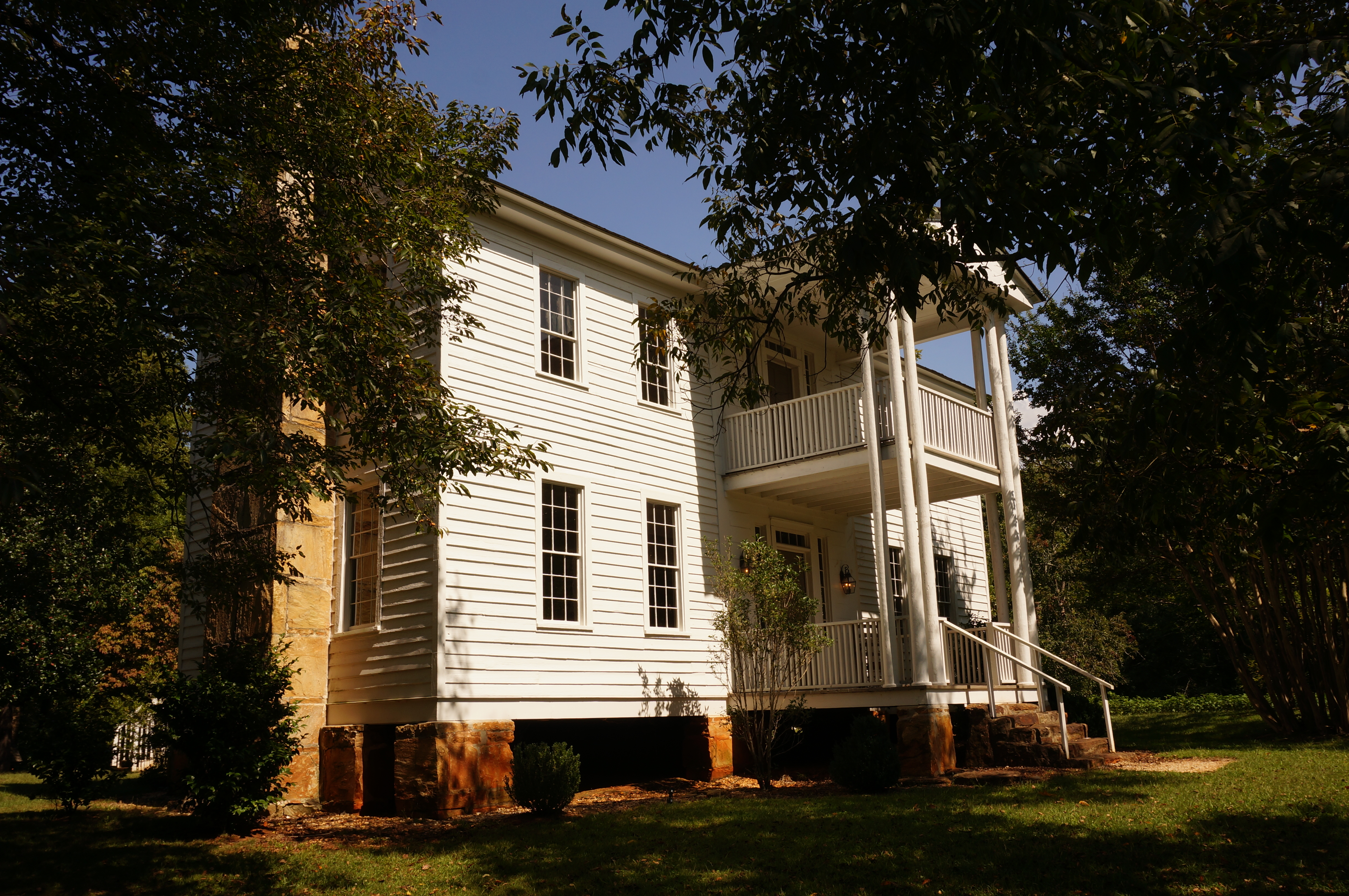
The Elisha Winn House served as Gwinnett County's first courthouse.

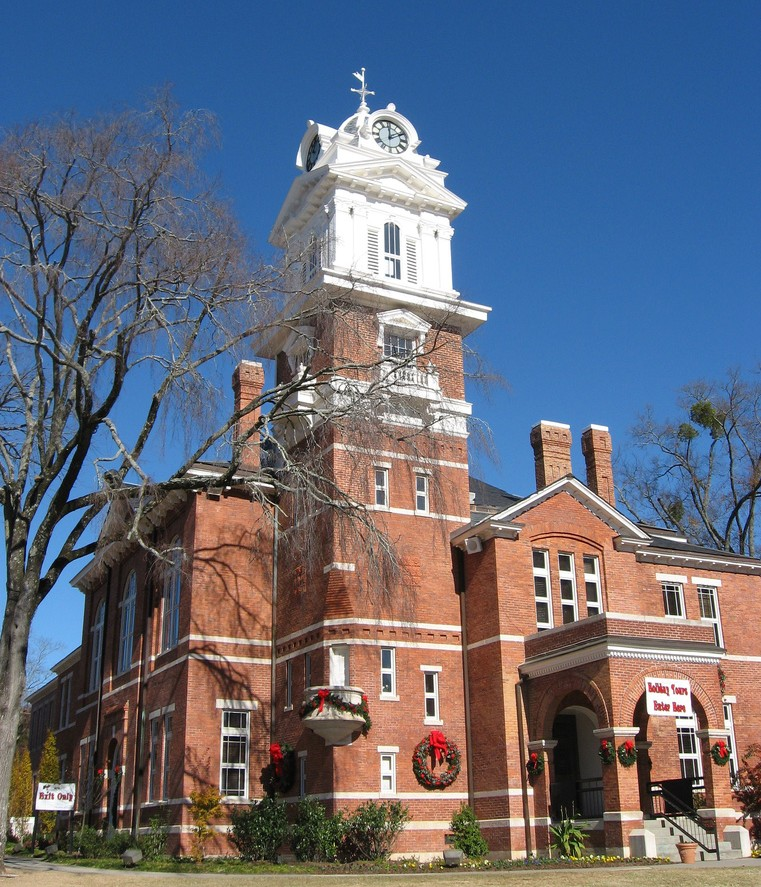
The Gwinnett Historic Courthouse is on the National Register of Historic Places and is now used for seasonal art exhibits, as an events venue, and for the Gwinnett Historical Society and Gwinnett Veterans Memorial Museum.

According to the U.S. Census Bureau, the county has a total area of 437 square miles (1,130 km^{2}), of which 430 square miles (1,100 km^{2}) is land and 6.4 square miles (17 km^{2}) (1.5%) is water. The county is located in the upper Piedmont region of the state.

It is located along the Eastern Continental Divide. A portion of the county to the northwest is a part of the Chattahoochee River National Recreation Area chain.

Allocation of water from the regional reservoir, Lake Lanier, at the extreme north of the county, has been subject to the Tri-state water dispute.

The southern and central portions of Gwinnett County are located in the Upper Ocmulgee River sub-basin of the Altamaha River basin. Most of the county's northern edge, from south of Peachtree Corners to north of Buford, is located in the Upper Chattahoochee River sub-basin of the ACF River Basin (Apalachicola-Chattahoochee-Flint River Basin). The county's eastern edge, north and south of Dacula, is located in the Upper Oconee River sub-basin of the same Altamaha River basin.

=== Adjacent counties ===
- Forsyth County – north
- Hall County – northeast
- Jackson County – northeast
- Barrow County – east
- Walton County – southeast
- Rockdale County – south
- DeKalb County – southwest
- Fulton County – west

== Communities ==
=== Cities ===
- Auburn (partly in Barrow County)
- Berkeley Lake
- Buford (partly in Hall County)
- Dacula
- Duluth
- Grayson
- Lawrenceville (county seat)
- Lilburn
- Loganville (partly in Walton County)
- Mulberry
- Norcross
- Peachtree Corners
- Snellville
- Sugar Hill
- Suwanee

=== Towns ===
- Braselton (partly in Jackson County, Hall County, and Barrow County)
- Rest Haven (partly in Hall County)

=== Census-designated places ===
- Mountain Park

=== Unincorporated communities ===
- Allendale
- Centerville
- Five Forks
- Harbins
- Hog Mountain
- Lucky Shoals
- Mechanicsville
- Mountain Park
- Rockbridge
- Rosebud

== Demographics ==
Historical population
Census	Pop.	Note	%±
1820	4,589		—
1830	13,289		189.6%
1840	10,804		−18.7%
1850	11,257		4.2%
1860	12,940		15.0%
1870	12,431		−3.9%
1880	19,531		57.1%
1890	19,899		1.9%
1900	25,585		28.6%
1910	28,824		12.7%
1920	30,327		5.2%
1930	27,853		−8.2%
1940	29,087		4.4%
1950	32,320		11.1%
1960	43,541		34.7%
1970	72,349		66.2%
1980	166,903		130.7%
1990	352,910		111.4%
2000	588,448		66.7%
2010	805,321		36.9%
2020	957,062		18.8%
2025 (est.)	1,018,099	▲	6.4%
U.S. Decennial Census; 1790-1880 1890-1910; 1920-1930 1930-1940; 1940-1950 1960-1980; 1980-2000 2010 2020

Gwinnett County is often cited as one of the counties in the US that has demographically changed the most rapidly. As recently as 1990, over 90% of Gwinnett County's population was white. By 2007, the county was projected to be majority-minority.

=== Racial and ethnic composition ===
Gwinnett County, Georgia – Racial and ethnic composition Note: the US Census treats Hispanic/Latino as an ethnic category. This table excludes Latinos from the racial categories and assigns them to a separate category. Hispanics/Latinos may be of any race.
Race / Ethnicity (NH = Non-Hispanic)	Pop 1980	Pop 1990	Pop 2000	Pop 2010	Pop 2020	% 1980	% 1990	% 2000	% 2010	% 2020
White alone (NH)	160,050	315,548	394,164	354,316	310,583	95.89%	89.41%	66.98%	44.00%	32.45%
Black or African American alone (NH)	4,070	17,971	76,837	184,122	257,124	2.44%	5.09%	13.06%	22.86%	26.87%
Native American or Alaska Native alone (NH)	200	681	1,057	1,535	1,532	0.12%	0.19%	0.18%	0.19%	0.16%
Asian alone (NH)	942	10,115	42,180	84,763	126,526	0.56%	2.87%	7.17%	10.53%	13.22%
Native Hawaiian or Pacific Islander alone (NH)	x	x	211	343	387	x	x	0.04%	0.04%	0.04%
Other race alone (NH)	215	125	1,099	2,489	6,489	0.13%	0.04%	0.19%	0.31%	0.68%
Mixed race or Multiracial (NH)	x	x	8,763	15,718	33,961	x	x	1.49%	1.95%	3.55%
Hispanic or Latino (any race)	1,426	8,470	64,137	162,035	220,460	0.85%	2.40%	10.90%	20.12%	23.04%
Total	166,903	352,910	588,448	805,321	957,062	100.00%	100.00%	100.00%	100.00%	100.00%

=== 2020 census ===
As of the 2020 census, there were 957,062 people, 316,708 households, and 230,960 families residing in the county.

The median age was 36.0 years. 25.9% of residents were under the age of 18 and 11.0% of residents were 65 years of age or older. For every 100 females there were 94.4 males, and for every 100 females age 18 and over there were 91.3 males age 18 and over. 99.5% of residents lived in urban areas, while 0.5% lived in rural areas.

The racial makeup of the county was 35.5% White, 27.4% Black or African American, 0.8% American Indian and Alaska Native, 13.3% Asian, 0.1% Native Hawaiian and Pacific Islander, 12.1% from some other race, and 10.7% from two or more races. Hispanic or Latino residents of any race comprised 23.0% of the population.

Of the 316,708 households, 40.9% had children under the age of 18 living with them and 26.1% had a female householder with no spouse or partner present. About 19.0% of all households were made up of individuals and 5.6% had someone living alone who was 65 years of age or older.

There were 330,569 housing units, of which 4.2% were vacant. Among occupied housing units, 65.3% were owner-occupied and 34.7% were renter-occupied. The homeowner vacancy rate was 1.4% and the rental vacancy rate was 6.0%.

=== 2010 census ===
In 2010, the median income for a household in the county was $63,219 and the median income for a family was $70,767. Males had a median income of $48,671 versus $39,540 for females. The per capita income for the county was $26,901. About 8.7% of families and 11.0% of the population were below the poverty line, including 15.1% of those under age 18 and 8.1% of those age 65 or over.

== Economy ==
- AGCO is headquartered in Duluth.
- American Megatrends is headquartered in unincorporated Gwinnett County near Norcross.
- ASHRAE's world headquarters is in Peachtree Corners.
- Comcast Corporation, the American global telecommunications conglomerate and owner of Xfinity and NBCUniversal, has its Southeast Headquarters in Peachtree Corners.
- Canon has its southeast region headquarters in Norcross.
- Fortune 500 companies CarMax and Mass Mutual as well as Honeywell, Sprint Corporation, Siemens Industry Automation, Fleetcor, ACI Worldwide, and CMD Group are among the businesses in Peachtree Corners.
- The Harlem Globetrotters are headquartered in Peachtree Corners.
- Primerica is headquartered in unincorporated Gwinnett County, near Duluth.
- United States Tennis Association (USTA)‘s headquarters for the Southern Section is in Peachtree Corners.
- Vantiva's United States office is in Norcross.
- Waffle House is headquartered in unincorporated Gwinnett County, near Norcross.
- Yerkes National Primate Research Center, the CDC's primate research center located on the campus of Emory University in Atlanta, maintains its high security Yerkes Field Station, which houses most of its primates, near Lawrenceville.

== Government and politics ==
Gwinnett County police car in 2021

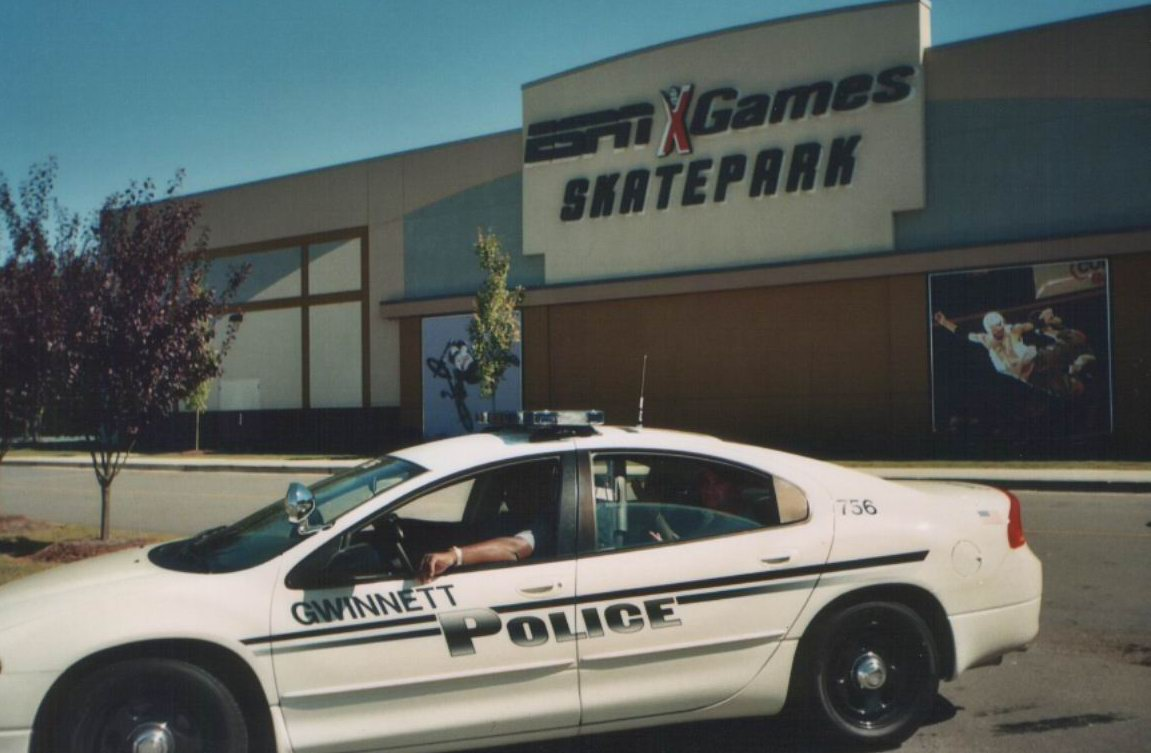
Gwinnett County police car in 2003

Under Georgia's "home rule" provision, county governments have free rein to legislate on all matters within the county, provided that such legislation does not conflict with state or federal law, or state or federal Constitutions.

Gwinnett County, Georgia is governed by a five-member Board of Commissioners, which exercises both legislative and executive authority within the county. The Chair of the Board is elected county-wide and serves full-time. The four other commissioners are elected from single-member districts and serve part-time positions. The board hires a county administrator who oversees daily operations of the county's twelve executive departments. Gwinnett County has a police department that operates under the authority of the Board of Commissioners. Some of the local Gwinnett city budgets have recently come under increasing scrutiny of the General Funds allocated to police services. Cities such as Duluth have allocated as much as forty percent of their city budgets, reaching some of the highest levels in the nation. Solutions to high spending being discussed include additional “investment in mental health, housing, youth development and living wages would stabilize communities and prove more effective than policing.”

In addition to the Board of Commissioners, county residents also elect persons to the following positions: Sheriff, District Attorney, Probate Court Judge, Clerk of State/Superior Court, Tax Commissioner, State Court Solicitor, Chief Magistrate Judge (who appoints other Magistrate Court judges), Chief Superior Court Judge and Superior Court Judges, and Chief State Court Judge and State Court Judges.

Gwinnett County has the largest public school system in the state of Georgia. Members of the Board of Education are elected from special election districts in the county.

For most of the time from 1964 to 2012, the county was a Republican stronghold in presidential elections. The only Democrat to carry the county in this period was former Georgia governor Jimmy Carter in 1976, who carried Gwinnett County during his sweep of every county in the state. However, the Republican edge narrowed, and then eventually was eliminated, in the 2010s as the county, as well as the rest of the Atlanta metro area, became larger and more diverse. In 2016, Hillary Clinton became the first Democrat to win Gwinnett County in 40 years and the first non-Georgian Democrat to do so since John F. Kennedy in 1960, doing so by 5.9 points. This was due to changing demographics with white college-educated voters, as well as a white flight out of the county. In 2018, Stacey Abrams became the first Democrat to win Gwinnett County in a gubernatorial election since 1986 when Joe Frank Harris swept every county statewide. The Democratic trend became even more apparent in 2020, when Joe Biden won 58.4% of the vote, the best showing for a non-Georgian Democrat since Kennedy's 73.5%.

Raphael Warnock earned 62.1% of the vote in the 2022 Senate runoff election, further improving upon Biden's result.

United States presidential election results for Gwinnett County, Georgia
Year	Republican		Democratic		Third party(ies)	
Year	No.	%	No.	%	No.	%
1880	244	11.87%	1,812	88.13%	0	0.00%
1884	146	11.77%	1,094	88.23%	0	0.00%
1888	186	8.40%	2,004	90.56%	23	1.04%
1892	253	9.20%	1,572	57.14%	926	33.66%
1896	773	35.77%	1,250	57.84%	138	6.39%
1900	373	22.50%	1,052	63.45%	233	14.05%
1904	132	5.98%	1,219	55.23%	856	38.79%
1908	541	32.77%	677	41.01%	433	26.23%
1912	55	3.35%	997	60.72%	590	35.93%
1916	222	10.99%	1,528	75.64%	270	13.37%
1920	1,140	40.93%	1,645	59.07%	0	0.00%
1924	207	15.52%	1,011	75.79%	116	8.70%
1928	1,062	52.26%	970	47.74%	0	0.00%
1932	91	3.36%	2,616	96.60%	1	0.04%
1936	541	18.49%	2,382	81.41%	3	0.10%
1940	728	15.26%	4,023	84.32%	20	0.42%
1944	713	17.60%	3,339	82.40%	0	0.00%
1948	413	11.08%	2,832	75.99%	482	12.93%
1952	1,015	14.42%	6,026	85.58%	0	0.00%
1956	1,443	20.24%	5,687	79.76%	0	0.00%
1960	2,336	26.50%	6,479	73.50%	0	0.00%
1964	6,823	50.42%	6,705	49.55%	3	0.02%
1968	5,350	30.59%	3,230	18.47%	8,909	50.94%
1972	18,181	86.26%	2,896	13.74%	0	0.00%
1976	13,912	40.03%	20,838	59.97%	0	0.00%
1980	27,185	52.84%	21,958	42.68%	2,309	4.49%
1984	54,749	79.48%	14,139	20.52%	0	0.00%
1988	66,372	75.47%	20,948	23.82%	620	0.71%
1992	81,822	54.34%	44,253	29.39%	24,501	16.27%
1996	96,610	59.29%	53,819	33.03%	12,516	7.68%
2000	121,756	63.71%	61,434	32.15%	7,921	4.14%
2004	160,445	65.66%	81,708	33.44%	2,190	0.90%
2008	158,746	54.56%	129,025	44.35%	3,167	1.09%
2012	159,855	53.76%	132,509	44.56%	4,992	1.68%
2016	146,989	44.41%	166,153	50.20%	17,808	5.38%
2020	166,400	40.16%	241,994	58.40%	5,956	1.44%
2024	173,041	41.13%	242,507	57.65%	5,133	1.22%

United States Senate election results for Gwinnett County, Georgia2
Year	Republican		Democratic		Third party(ies)	
Year	No.	%	No.	%	No.	%
2020	166,754	40.55%	233,551	56.80%	10,901	2.65%
2020	147,563	39.89%	222,346	60.11%	0	0.00%

United States Senate election results for Gwinnett County, Georgia3
Year	Republican		Democratic		Third party(ies)	
Year	No.	%	No.	%	No.	%
2020	88,613	22.00%	142,968	35.50%	171,134	42.50%
2020	145,597	39.37%	224,197	60.63%	0	0.00%
2022	115,024	38.59%	175,688	58.95%	7,324	2.46%
2022	100,600	37.87%	165,066	62.13%	0	0.00%

Georgia Gubernatorial election results for Gwinnett County
Year	Republican		Democratic		Third party(ies)	
Year	No.	%	No.	%	No.	%
2018	132,998	42.23%	178,097	56.55%	3,823	1.21%
2022	133,076	44.44%	164,051	54.78%	2,355	0.79%

Gwinnett County is one of six "reverse pivot counties", counties that voted Republican in 2008 and 2012 before voting Democratic in 2016 onward.

=== Gwinnett County Board of Commissioners ===
District	Name	Party	First elected	Incorporated Cities of Gwinnett County represented
At-Large (Chair)	Nicole Love Hendrickson	Democratic	2020	All
1	Kirkland Carden	Democratic	2020	Duluth, Peachtree Corners, Berkeley Lake, Suwanee, Norcross
2	Ben Ku	Democratic	2018	Lilburn, Unincorporated Tucker, Unincorporated Stone Mountain, Unincorporated Norcross, Unincorporated Lawrenceville
3	Jasper Watkins III	Democratic	2020	Auburn, Braselton, Dacula, Lawrenceville, Grayson, Loganville, Snellville
4	Matthew Holtkamp	Republican	2022	Buford, Lawrenceville, Rest Haven, Sugar Hill, Suwanee

=== United States Congress ===
Senators	Name	Party	First Elected	Level
Senate Class 2	Jon Ossoff	Democratic	2021	Senior Senator
Senate Class 3	Raphael Warnock	Democratic	2021	Junior Senator
Representatives	Name	Party	First Elected	Area(s) of Gwinnett County represented
District 4	Hank Johnson	Democratic	2007	Berkeley Lake, Duluth, Lilburn, Norcross, Peachtree Corners
District 9	Andrew Clyde	Republican	2020	Auburn, Braselton, Buford, Dacula, Lawrenceville, Mulberry, Rest Haven, Sugar Hill, Suwanee
District 10	Mike Collins	Republican	2023	Dacula
District 13	Everton Blair	Democratic	2003	Grayson, Lawrenceville, Lilburn, Loganville, Snellville

=== Georgia General Assembly ===
==== Georgia State Senate ====
District	Name	Party	First Elected	Area(s) of Gwinnett County represented
5	Sheikh Rahman	Democratic	2019	Lawrenceville, Lilburn, Norcross, Peachtree Corners
7	Nabilah Islam	Democratic	2023	Berkeley Lake, Duluth, Lawrenceville, Norcross, Peachtree Corners, Suwanee
9	Nikki Merritt	Democratic	2021	Grayson, Lawrenceville, Lilburn, Loganville, Snellville
40	Sally Harrell	Democratic	2019	Norcross, Peachtree Corners
43	Tonya Anderson	Democratic	2017	Grayson, Loganville, Snellville
45	Clint Dixon	Republican	2021	Auburn, Braselton, Buford, Dacula, Lawrenceville, Mulberry, Rest Haven, Sugar Hill, Suwanee
46	Bill Cowsert	Republican	2007	Dacula
48	Shawn Still	Republican	2023	Buford, Sugar Hill, Suwanee
55	Randal Mangham	Democratic	2025	Snellville

==== Georgia House of Representatives ====
District	Name	Party	First Elected	Area(s) of Gwinnett County represented
30	Derrick McCollum	Republican	2022	Braselton, Buford, Mulberry
48	Scott Hilton	Republican	2023	Peachtree Corners
88	Billy Mitchell	Democratic	2003	Lilburn
93	Doreen Carter	Democratic	2015	Snellville
94	Karen Bennett	Democratic	2013	Snellville
95	Dar'shun Kendrick	Democratic	2011	Snellville
96	Arlene Beckles	Democratic	2025	Duluth, Norcross, Peachtree Corners
97	Ruwa Romman	Democratic	2023	Berkeley Lake, Duluth, Norcross, Peachtree Corners
98	Marvin Lim	Democratic	2021	Lilburn, Norcross
99	Matt Reeves	Republican	2023	Duluth, Sugar Hill, Suwanee
100	David Clark	Republican	2015	Buford, Rest Haven, Sugar Hill, Suwanee
102	Gabe Okoye	Democratic	2023	Grayson, Lawrenceville
103	Soo Hong	Republican	2023	Buford, Rest Haven, Sugar Hill, Suwanee
104	Chuck Efstration	Republican	2013	Auburn, Braselton, Mulberry
105	Sandy Donatucci	Republican	2025	Buford, Dacula
106	Akbar Ali	Democratic	2025	Lawrenceville, Lilburn, Snellville
107	Sam Park	Democratic	2017	Lawrenceville, Suwanee
108	Jasmine Clark	Democratic	2019	Lilburn
109	Dewey McClain	Democratic	2013	Lawrenceville, Lilburn
110	Segun Adeyina	Democratic	2023	Grayson, Lawrenceville, Loganville, Snellville
111	Reynaldo Martinez	Republican	2023	Dacula, Loganville
112	Bruce Williamson	Republican	2011	Loganville

== Hospitals ==
- Northside Hospital Gwinnett – Lawrenceville
- Northside Hospital Duluth – Duluth
- Piedmont Hospital Eastside - Snellville (formerly an HCA hospital, purchased by Piedmont in 2020.)

== Media ==
The county's main newspaper is the Gwinnett Daily Post.

The Spanish-language newspaper El Nuevo Georgia has its headquarters in unincorporated Gwinnett County, near Norcross. Telemundo Atlanta is based in Gwinnett.

== Parks ==
Gwinnett County Parks and Recreation operates and maintains parks, playgrounds, swimming pools, golf courses and recreation centers in the county. The department also runs recreational and educational programs. The parks system has won many awards such as the gold medal in 2008 from American Academy for Park and Recreation Administration and National Recreation and Park Association. They were also finalists in 1999, 2006, and 2014. The system has also been cited to use STEM by NRPA.

== Education ==
=== Primary and secondary schools ===
Gwinnett County Public Schools operates the public schools for residents in Gwinnett County, with the exception of residents inside the Buford city limits, which are served by the Buford City School District. There are 143 schools in the Gwinnett Public Schools district—21 high schools, 29 middle schools, 80 elementary schools and 13 specialty schools, making it the largest school district in Georgia.

A charter school, International Charter Academy of Georgia, that has a bilingual English and Japanese education program, is in Peachtree Corners. Another charter school, New Life Academy of Excellence, that has a bilingual English and Chinese education program, is near Peachtree Corners.

=== Private education ===
- Greater Atlanta Christian School, the second-largest independent school in Georgia, is located in Norcross.
- Hebron Christian Academy is located in Dacula.
- Notre Dame Academy, a Pre-Kindergarten through 12th grade Catholic school, is located in Duluth.
- Providence Christian Academy is located in Lilburn.
- Wesleyan School is located in Peachtree Corners.

=== Colleges and universities ===
- Georgia Gwinnett College is located in Lawrenceville.
- Gwinnett Technical College is also located in Lawrenceville.
- Philadelphia College of Osteopathic Medicine is located in Suwanee.
- Trevecca Nazarene University has an adult education site in Duluth.
- University of Georgia has a satellite campus in Lawrenceville.

== Sports ==
Minor-league affiliates of the NHL Nashville Predators and the MLB Atlanta Braves play home games and talent scout in the area.

In 2016, the Georgia Swarm of the National Lacrosse League relocated from Minnesota and began playing games at Infinite Energy Arena. The team won the league championship in 2017.

Georgia Force of Arena Football League had also played at Arena at Gwinnett Center before the team folded in 2012.

Club	Sport	League	Venue	Founded	Titles
Atlanta Gladiators	Ice hockey	ECHL	Gas South Arena	1995	0
Gwinnett Stripers	Baseball	International League	Coolray Field	2009	0
Georgia Swarm	Lacrosse	National Lacrosse League	Gas South Arena	2004	1

Gwinnett also hosts the Gwinnett Lions Rugby Football Club, a Division 3 Men's Rugby Team competing in the Georgia Rugby Union.

== Transportation ==
=== Airport ===
The county maintains a regional airport under the name Gwinnett County Airport, formerly Briscoe Field. The closest major airport serving the region is Hartsfield–Jackson Atlanta International Airport.

=== Major roads and expressways ===
- I-85 / SR 403 (unsigned)
- I-985 / SR 365 / SR 419 (unsigned)
- US 23
- US 29
  - US 29 Bus.
- US 78 / SR 10
- SR 8
- SR 13
- SR 20
- SR 84
- SR 120
- SR 124
- SR 140
- SR 141
- SR 211
- SR 264
- SR 316
- SR 317
- SR 324
- SR 347
- SR 378

=== Transit systems ===
- GRTA Xpress commuter buses and Ride Gwinnett (formerly Gwinnett County Transit) serve the county.
- Norcross Greyhound Bus Terminal, 2105 Norcross Pkwy, Norcross, GA 30071
- On April 12, 2018, Gwinnett County officials updated the transit plans to connect to the rest of Metro Atlanta via heavy rail.

=== Pedestrians and cycling ===
- Beaver Ruin Creek Greenway (Proposed)
- Camp Creek Greenway
- Cedar Creek Trail Loop
- Crooked Creek Trail (Proposed)
- Harbins Greenway (Proposed)
- Ivy Creek Greenway (Under construction)
- Ivy Creek-Snellville Trail (Proposed)
- Norcross-Lilburn Trail (Proposed)
- Piedmont Pathway (Proposed)
- Riverlands Path (Under construction)
- Sugar Hill Greenway (Under construction)
- Suwanee Creek Greenway (Under construction)
- The Loop Trail (Proposed)
- Western Gwinnett Bikeway (Under construction)

In 2015, Peachtree Corners conducted a Livable Centers Initiative (LCI) survey which indicated public desire for more multi-use trails. Beginning in 2016, Peachtree Corners has been in the process of constructing 11.5 miles of multi-use trails within the city limits.

In 2016, Suwanee unveiled the first Bike Share program in Gwinnett County.

== Notable people ==
- David Andrews, NFL football player with the New England Patriots.
- Elijah Bryant (born 1995), basketball player in the Israeli Basketball Premier League
- Brice Butler, NFL wide receiver with the Dallas Cowboys.
- Sam Flint (1882–1980), actor
- Travis Hunter, Heisman Trophy winner 2024
- Alvin Kamara, NFL running back with the New Orleans Saints.
- Chandler Massey, actor (Days of Our Lives); received the 2012, 2013, and 2014 Daytime Emmy Award for Outstanding Younger Actor in a Drama Series. In 2012, Massey became the first actor ever to receive a Daytime Emmy Award for playing a gay character.
- Jodie Meeks, NBA shooting guard with the Washington Wizards.
- Migos, hip hop group.
- Maya Moore, women's basketball player with the Minnesota Lynx.
- James Ramsey, Major League Baseball player with the Los Angeles Dodgers.
- Rittz, musician.
- Trey Thompkins, basketball player formerly with Los Angeles Clippers.

== See also ==
- National Register of Historic Places listings in Gwinnett County, GA
- Larry Flynt shooting and Barbara Mackle kidnapping
- List of counties in Georgia
