= Brenda Lopez Romero =

American politician

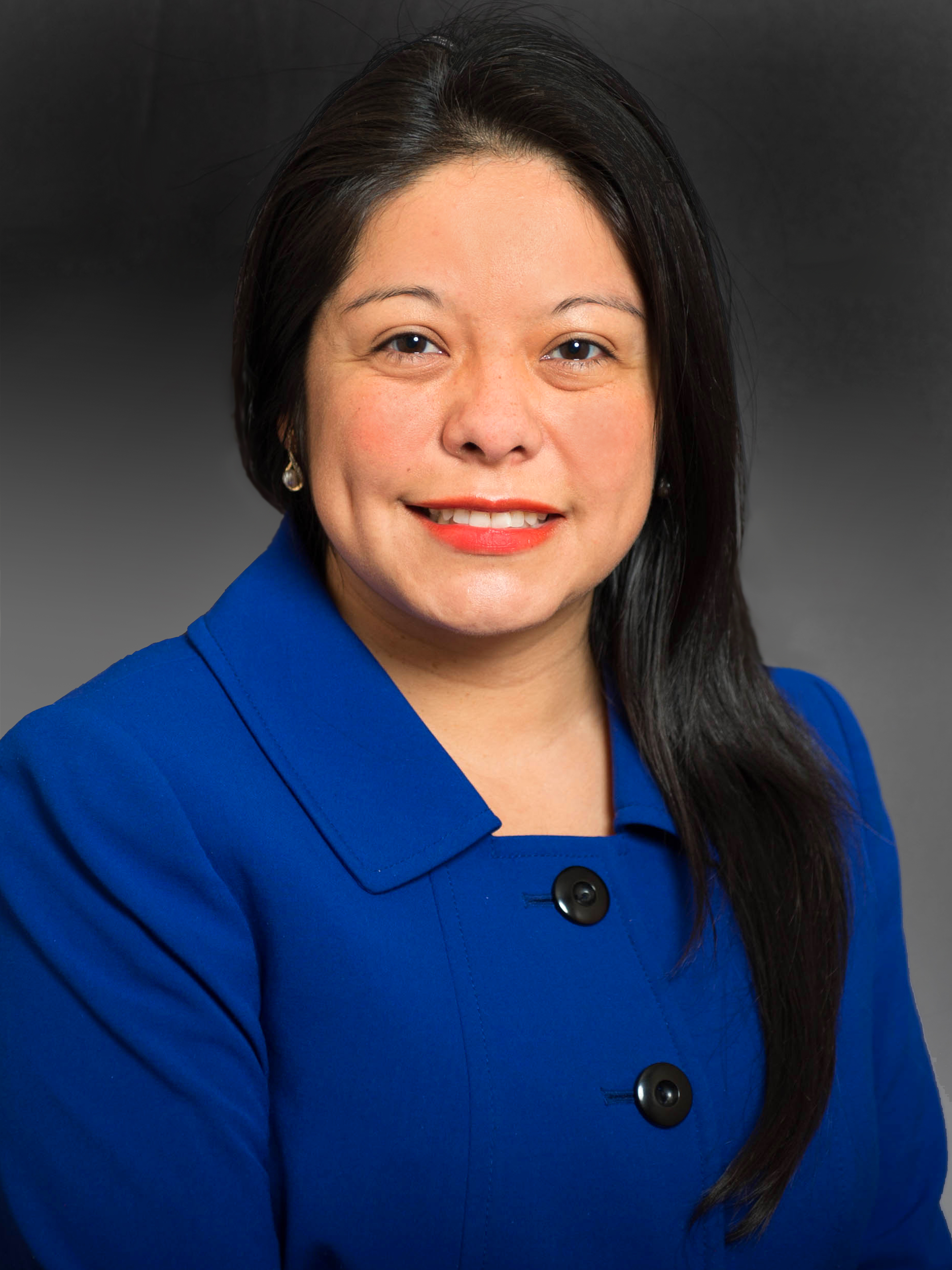

Member of the Georgia House of Representatives from the 99th district
- In office January 9, 2017 – January 11, 2021
- Preceded by: Hugh Floyd
- Succeeded by: Marvin Lim

Personal details
- Born: January 4 Cuernavaca, Mexico
- Party: Democratic
- Education: Georgia State University (BA); Syracuse University (JD)
- Website: Campaign website

Brenda Lopez Romero is an American politician who became the first Latina to be elected to the Georgia General Assembly in 2016. She was a member of the Georgia House of Representatives from the 99th District, serving from 2017 to 2021. In the House, Romero served on the Education, Retirement, and State Planning and Community Affairs committees. Lopez Romero sponsored 72 bills and is a member of the Democratic Party.

After weeks of lobbying by the Latino Victory Fund, Georgia House Minority Leader Bob Trammell and other public figures in the state, Romero launched her campaign for Georgia's 7th congressional district on May 1, 2019. After a second place finish to Carolyn Bourdeaux, Romero went on to lead the Gwinnett County Democratic Party as its Chair. Additionally, she serves as Senior Assistant District Attorney for the Gwinnett Judicial Circuit handling special projects.

== Early life, education, and career ==
Lopez Romero was born in the Mexican city of Cuernavaca and came to the United States at the age of five. In 2008, after years of waiting on a backlog, Lopez Romero became a U.S. Citizen. She graduated from Cross Keys High School in DeKalb County. After becoming the first in her family to graduate high school, Lopez Romero earned a bachelor's degree in political science and sociology from Georgia State University in 2005. She then went on to receive her Juris Doctor, with a concentration in National Security and Counterterrorism, from Syracuse University College of Law. Before graduating law school in 2011, Lopez Romero served as a law clerk for the Farmworker's Division of the Georgia Legal Services Program; she then clerked for the ACLU of Georgia's National Security and Immigrant Rights Project.

In 2011, after being admitted to the State Bar of Georgia, Lopez Romero managed the immigration department for the Velasquez Law Firm, LLC. In 2012, through her role as a staff attorney for Catholic Charities' Immigration Legal Services, Lopez Romero represented numerous low-income immigrants and families in times of crisis. In 2013, she opened her own law firm in Norcross, Georgia primarily dealing with immigration matters.

== Georgia House of Representatives ==
=== 2016 and 2018 campaigns ===
In 2016, Lopez Romero ran to represent Georgia's 99th State House District in the General Assembly. After beating Jay Trevari in the Democratic primary, Lopez Romero won 100% of the vote in the general election and became the first Latina elected to the state's legislature. In 2018, Lopez Romero ran for re-election to the State House; she handily beat her primary opponent, Shawn Allen, winning 77% of the vote. She again ran unopposed in the general election and was subsequently re-elected with 100% of the vote.

=== Legislative tenure ===
After being sworn in 2017, Lopez Romero served on the Education, Retirement, and State Planning and Community Affairs committees. She sponsored, or co-authored, 72 bills in office.

==== HB 481 ====
Lopez Romero was opposed to and voted against Georgia House Bill 481, a bill proposing a six-week abortion ban. She, along with several other lawmakers, brought coathangers onto the House floor to show her opposition to the controversial bill.

==== HB 896 ====
In 2020, Lopez Romero, along with several other legislators, introduced HB 896; the bill seeks to allow high school graduates in Georgia to receive in-state tuition regardless of their immigration status. If passed, Georgia would have been the 20th state to enact such a law.

=== 2026 Campaign ===
In April of 2025, Brenda Lopez Romero announced her candidacy for re-election to represent Georgia’s 98th House District in the 2026 election.

== 2020 congressional campaign ==
On May 1, 2019, Lopez Romero announced that she would not seek re-election to the State House and would instead run for Georgia's 7th congressional district. Upon announcing she said, "We have a unique opportunity to elect someone who reflects the values and the rich diversity of our district...I know that I am the right person for the job.” Soon after announcing, she was endorsed by Georgia House Minority Leader Bob Trammell, Chair of the Gwinnett House Delegation Rep. Pedro Marin, Atlanta Public Schools Board of Education Board Chair Jason Esteves, Georgia House Democratic Chair James Beverly, and several other major figures in the state.

After the June 9, 2020 election, numerous media outlets had initially declared that the primary would be going to a runoff between Lopez Romero and Carolyn Bourdeaux; however, after tens of thousands of absentee ballots were counted, Bourdeaux was declared to have won the primary outright.

In her concession statement, Brenda Lopez Romero stated, "I am about to walk into legislative session and just walked out of our streets as I protested and stated that #BlackLivesMatter, this impresses upon me how vital our work is and that there is still a great deal to do for our state and country. As I finish up my last term in the state legislature (for now), I will continue to fight for the hate crimes bill and justice-for-all legislation, push back against cuts to our education budget, and reform our state’s election laws so every citizen can exercise their sacred right to vote with ease and security. Furthermore, I will concentrate on supporting efforts to flip the 16 state house seats we need in order to prevent disastrous gerrymandering in 2021....No one is voiceless. Rather, there are those whose voices are always heard and those whose voices continue to be ignored. It is my goal to magnify the voices and perspectives of those who are ignored."

== Honors and awards ==
The Georgia Association of Educators' gave Lopez Romero the 2017 Friend of Education Award. In 2019, she was recognized as one of the 50 Most Influential Latinos in Georgia. She was also one of 21 women to have been selected as one of the Atlanta Business Chronicle's 2019 Women Who Mean Business honorees. Leadership Atlanta chose Lopez Romero to be part of their Class of 2020.

== Electoral history ==
Georgia's 99th State House District, Democratic primary, 2016
Party	Candidate	Vote%	Votes
Dem.	Brenda Lopez Romero	57.87%	566
Dem.	Jay Trevari	42.13%	412
Total Votes			978

Georgia's 99th State House District, General Election, 2016
Party	Candidate	Vote%	Votes
Dem.	Brenda Lopez Romero	100%	8,060
(unopposed)
Total Votes			8,060

Georgia's 99th State House District, Democratic primary, 2018
Party	Candidate	Vote %	Votes
Dem.	Brenda Lopez Romero	77.1%	1,082
Dem.	Shawn Allen	22.9%	321
Total Votes			1,403

Georgia's 99th State House District, General Election, 2018
Party	Candidate	Vote %	Votes
Dem.	Brenda Lopez Romero	100%	7,362
(unopposed)
Total Votes			7,362
