= Pedro Marin =

Pedro Marin may refer to:

- Manuel Marulanda, nom de guerre of Colombian revolutionary, Pedro Antonio Marín
- Pedro Marin (politician)
