= El Nuevo Georgia =

Biweekly newspaper in Gwinnett County, Georgia, United States

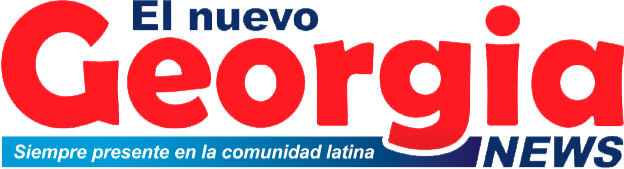
- Type: Biweekly newspaper
- Founded: 1998
- Headquarters: Gwinnett County, Georgia
- Circulation: 20,000
- Website: elnuevogeorgia.com

El Nuevo Georgia is a Spanish-language newspaper distributed in Greater Atlanta, with its headquarters in unincorporated Gwinnett County, Georgia, near Norcross. Published since March 1998

== Circulation and Coverage ==
El Nuevo Georgia is a biweekly newspaper and is published on Thursdays. As of 2011, its circulation is 20,000 issues. As of January 2011, the newspaper prints 40,000 copies each month. The newspaper is distributed in 13 counties and 36 cities around Greater Atlanta. As of 2012 Rafael Navarro is the editor of the newspaper.

The newspaper has been published since March 1998. In the article "Repression in the Age of Deal" in the January 6, 2011 issue, the newspaper published a doctored photograph of Governor of Georgia Nathan Deal, a Republican, dressed as a Nazi, wearing a Nazi armband, and performing an Adolf Hitler salute. The article itself discussed Deal's previous financial issues and an ethics investigation of Deal. The photograph received criticism from members of both political parties. Pedro Marin, a state representative belonging to the Democratic Party and, at the time, one of Georgia's two Hispanic legislators, criticized the doctored photograph. Brian Robinson, Deal's spokesperson, said "Those who can't formulate a coherent argument in our society's marketplace of ideas often resort to childish, even offensive tactics. This is pathetic." Deal himself made no statement about the image. Navarro said that the newspaper used the image to represent fear in Hispanic immigrants due to Deal's speeches against immigration during his previous election campaign. According to Navarro, traffic to the website of El Nuevo Georgia increased to new records after other local media reported on the Deal image controversy.
