= Georgia's 104th House of Representatives district =

State district in Georgia, USA

Georgia's 104th State House of Representatives district
Representative
| Chuck Efstration; R–Mulberry |
- Demographics: 53.7% White; 24.8% Black; 15.9% Hispanic; 3.3% Asian
- Population: 60,695

District 104 elects one member of the Georgia House of Representatives. It contains parts of Barrow County and Gwinnett County.

== Members ==
- Donna Sheldon (2013)
- Chuck Efstration (since 2013)
