= Hugh Floyd =

American politician (born 1941)

Member of the Georgia House of Representatives from the 99th district
- In office 2002–2017
- Succeeded by: Brenda Lopez Romero

Personal details
- Born: January 18, 1941 (age 85) Parris Island, South Carolina, United States
- Party: Democratic

Hugh Floyd (born January 18, 1941) is an American politician. He is a former member of the Georgia House of Representatives from the 99th District, serving from 2002 to 2017. He is a member of the Democratic Party.
