= Sugar Hill, Georgia =

- City
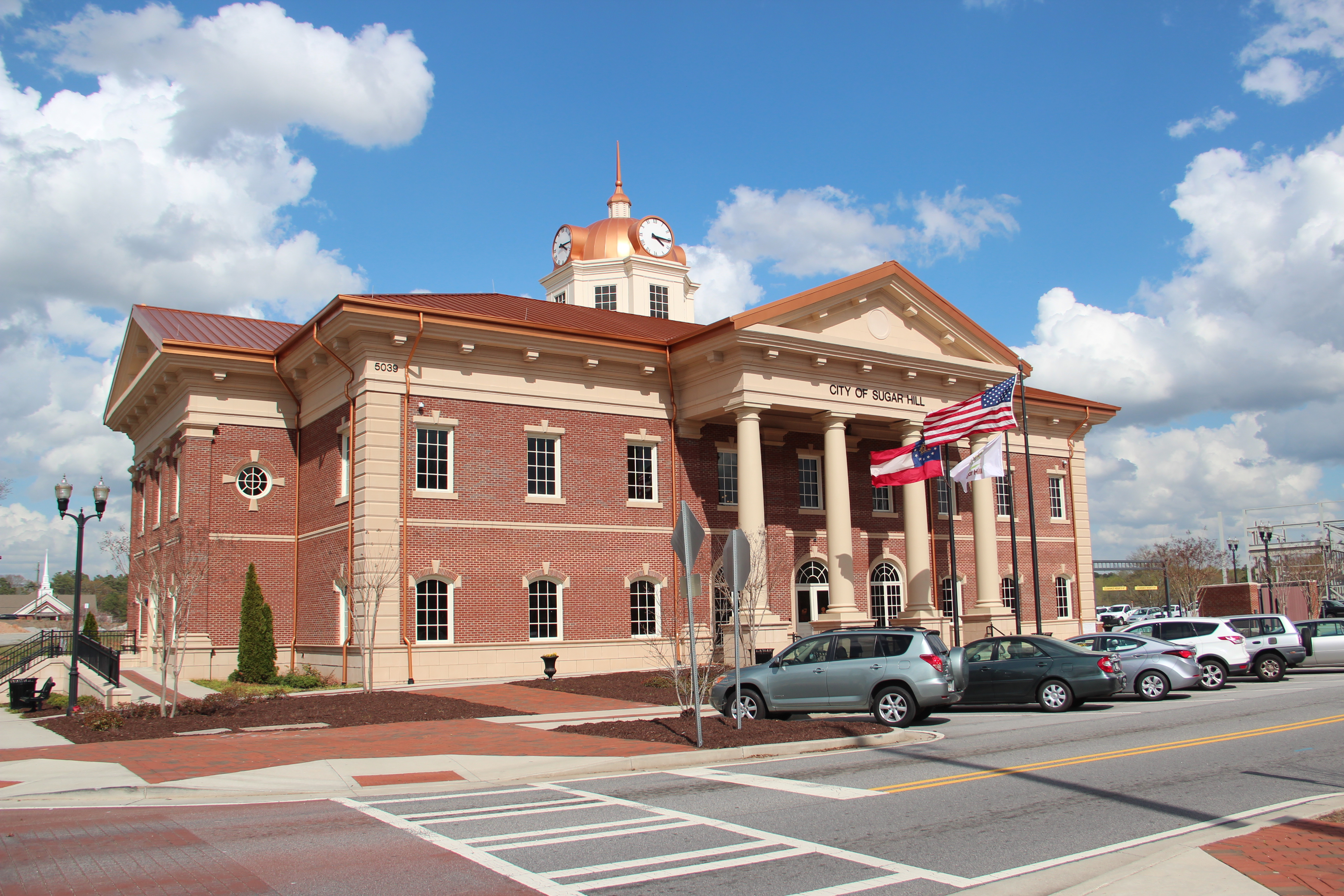
- Sugar Hill City Hall

- Flag Seal Logo
- Samantha Piovesan Interactive location map of Sugar Hill
- Coordinates: 34.085962°N 84.033970°W
- Country: United States
- State: Georgia
- County: Gwinnett
- Incorporated (town): March 24, 1939
- Incorporated (city): 1975

Government
  - Type: Mayor–Council
  - Mayor: Brandon Hembree
  - Councilmembers: Joshua Page; Gary Pirkle; Meg Avery; Alvin Hicks; Samantha Piovesan

Area
  - Total: 11.357 sq mi (29.414 km^{2})
  - Land: 11.301 sq mi (29.270 km^{2})
  - Water: 0.056 sq mi (0.145 km^{2}) 0.49%
- Elevation: 1,079 ft (329 m)

Population (2020)
  - Total: 25,076
  - Estimate (2024): 28,598
  - Density: 2,218.9/sq mi (856.71/km^{2})
- Time zone: UTC–5 (Eastern (EST))
  - Summer (DST): UTC–4 (EDT)
- ZIP Code: 30518
- Area codes: 770, 678, 470, and 943
- FIPS code: 13-74180
- GNIS feature ID: 2405538
- Website: cityofsugarhill.com

Sugar Hill is a city in northern Gwinnett County in the U.S. state of Georgia, included within the Metro Atlanta area. The population was 25,076 at the 2020 census, and was estimated at 28,598 in 2024, making it the fourth-largest city in Gwinnett County. It is in close proximity to Lake Lanier and the foothills of the North Georgia mountains.

== History ==
Sugar Hill was established through a charter by the Georgia state assembly in 1939 as the Town of Sugar Hill and officially incorporated on March 24, 1939. The town was renamed the City of Sugar Hill in 1975. Before the city was incorporated, the area was part of a route from the railroad in Buford to the city of Cumming. According to local tradition, the town was named after an incident where a large shipment of sugar spilled and the area became known as "the hill where the sugar spilled" or "the sugar hill".

In 2001, a drastic increase in natural gas prices, disproportionate to the cost of natural gas outside of Sugar Hill, resulted in residents forming "The Committee to Dissolve Sugar Hill", with over 1,600 residents signing a petition calling for a referendum to abolish both the municipal utility and the city itself. State senator Billy Ray proposed a bill asking for a non-binding referendum. The bill was passed in the state senate but failed to pass in the House, and the effort to revoke the city's charter was unsuccessful. The city council responded to this effort by reducing the utility's prices to be comparable to those in the surrounding area.

== Geography ==
Sugar Hill, Georgia

Climate chart (precipitation, max. and min. temperature)
| J | F | M | A | M | J | J | A | S | O | N | D |
| 5.2 50 32 | 5.3 54 34 | 5.2 63 41 | 3.7 71 48 | 3.8 77 56 | 4.1 84 65 | 4.2 87 69 | 4.4 86 68 | 4.6 80 61 | 3.9 71 51 | 4.3 62 42 | 4.7 52 34 |
- █ Average max. and min. temperatures in °F
- █ Precipitation totals in inches
Metric conversion
| J | F | M | A | M | J | J | A | S | O | N | D |
| 131 10 0 | 134 12 1 | 133 17 5 | 94 22 9 | 97 25 13 | 105 29 18 | 107 31 21 | 112 30 20 | 116 27 16 | 99 22 11 | 110 17 6 | 118 11 1 |
- █ Average max. and min. temperatures in °C
- █ Precipitation totals in mm

Sugar Hill is located in northern Gwinnett County in northern Georgia. It is bordered to the northeast by the city of Buford and to the southwest by the city of Suwanee. Georgia State Route 20 is the main highway through the center of Sugar Hill, leading northwest 11 miles (18 km) to Cumming and south 12 miles (19 km) to Lawrenceville, the Gwinnett County seat. U.S. Route 23 runs along the southern edge of Sugar Hill, leading southwest 5 miles (8 km) to Suwanee and 10 miles (16 km) to Duluth. US 23 turns southeast at the Sugar Hill–Buford border and runs 1 mile (1.6 km) with SR 20 to Interstate 985, which in turn leads northeast 19 miles (31 km) to Gainesville and southwest 36 miles (58 km) to Downtown Atlanta.

According to the United States Census Bureau, the city has a total area of 11.357 square miles (29.41 km^{2}), of which 11.301 square miles (29.27 km^{2}) is land and 0.056 square miles (0.15 km^{2}) (0.49%) is water. The United States Geological Survey lists the city's elevation as 1,079 feet (329 m).

=== Climate ===
The climate of Sugar Hill, as with most of the southeastern United States, is humid subtropical (Cfa) according to the Köppen classification with four seasons, including hot, humid summers and cool winters.

July is generally the warmest month of the year with an average high of around 87 °F (31 °C). The coldest month is January which has an average high of around 50 °F (10 °C). The highest recorded temperature was 107 °F (42 °C) in 1952, while the lowest recorded temperature was −8 °F (−22 °C) in 1985.

Sugar Hill receives abundant rainfall distributed fairly evenly throughout the year, as is typical of southeastern cities, with February on average having the highest average precipitation at 5.3 inches (130 mm), and April typically being the driest month with 3.7 inches (94 mm).

== Demographics ==
Historical population
| Census | Pop. | Note | %± |
|---|---|---|---|
| 1940 | 599 | | — |
| 1950 | 783 | | 30.7% |
| 1960 | 1,175 | | 50.1% |
| 1970 | 1,745 | | 48.5% |
| 1980 | 2,473 | | 41.7% |
| 1990 | 4,557 | | 84.3% |
| 2000 | 11,399 | | 150.1% |
| 2010 | 18,522 | | 62.5% |
| 2020 | 25,076 | | 35.4% |
| 2025 (est.) | 29,280 | ▲ | 16.8% |
U.S. Decennial Census; 2020 Census; 2025

Sugar Hill is Gwinnett County's fourth-largest city by population. The city was previously the third-largest city in Gwinnett County until Peachtree Corners became a city on July 1, 2012. After the 2000 census the city's growth was ranked 75 out of the 100 highest growing cities in the nation, and one of the 20 fastest growing in the state of Georgia. The population growth from 2010 to 2020 was an increase of 35.4%. Sugar Hill grew from 25,076 residents in the 2020 Census to approximately 28,598 by 2024, a 14% increase.

According to realtor website Zillow, the average price of a home as of November 30, 2025, in Sugar Hill is $458,802.

As of the 2023 American Community Survey, there are 8,545 estimated households in Sugar Hill with an average of 2.96 persons per household. The city has a median household income of $99,479. Approximately 9.5% of the city's population lives at or below the poverty line. Sugar Hill has an estimated 67.4% employment rate, with 46.5% of the population holding a bachelor's degree or higher and 91.9% holding a high school diploma. There were 8,698 housing units at an average density of 769.67 per square mile (297.2/km^{2}).

The top five reported languages (people were allowed to report up to two languages, thus the figures will generally add to more than 100%) were English (66.8%), Spanish (15.8%), Indo-European (6.3%), Asian and Pacific Islander (9.1%), and Other (2.0%).

The median age in the city was 36.3 years.

=== Racial and ethnic composition ===
Sugar Hill, Georgia – racial and ethnic composition Note: the US Census treats Hispanic/Latino as an ethnic category. This table excludes Latinos from the racial categories and assigns them to a separate category. Hispanics/Latinos may be of any race.
| Race / ethnicity (NH = non-Hispanic) | Pop. 1990 | Pop. 2000 | Pop. 2010 | Pop. 2020 | % 1990 | % 2000 | % 2010 | % 2020 |
|---|---|---|---|---|---|---|---|---|
| White alone (NH) | 4,422 | 9,496 | 11,630 | 12,248 | 97.04% | 83.31% | 62.79% | 48.84% |
| Black or African American alone (NH) | 38 | 524 | 1,747 | 3,104 | 0.83% | 4.60% | 9.43% | 12.38% |
| Native American or Alaska Native alone (NH) | 5 | 15 | 24 | 36 | 0.11% | 0.13% | 0.13% | 0.14% |
| Asian alone (NH) | 12 | 186 | 1,148 | 3,813 | 0.26% | 1.63% | 6.20% | 15.21% |
| Pacific Islander alone (NH) | — | 2 | 8 | 12 | — | 0.02% | 0.04% | 0.05% |
| Other race alone (NH) | 0 | 18 | 46 | 152 | 0.00% | 0.16% | 0.25% | 0.61% |
| Mixed race or multiracial (NH) | — | 119 | 283 | 979 | — | 1.04% | 1.53% | 3.90% |
| Hispanic or Latino (any race) | 80 | 1,039 | 3,636 | 4,732 | 1.76% | 9.11% | 19.63% | 18.87% |
| Total | 4,557 | 11,399 | 18,522 | 25,076 | 100.00% | 100.00% | 100.00% | 100.00% |

=== 2024 estimate ===
As of the 2024 estimate, there were 28,598 people, 8,545 households, and _ families residing in the city. The population density was 2,530.57 inhabitants per square mile (977.1/km^{2}). There were 8,698 housing units at an average density of 769.67 per square mile (297.2/km^{2}). The racial makeup of the city was 53.4% White (49.4% NH White), 16.2% African American, 0.7% Native American, 13.0% Asian, 0.0% Pacific Islander, _% from some other races and 12.2% from two or more races. Hispanic or Latino people of any race were 18.8% of the population.

=== 2020 census ===
As of the 2020 census, Sugar Hill had a population of 25,076. The median age was 35.8 years. 28.8% of residents were under the age of 18 and 9.4% were 65 years of age or older. For every 100 females there were 94.9 males, and for every 100 females age 18 and over there were 90.3 males age 18 and over.

100.0% of residents lived in urban areas, while 0.0% lived in rural areas.

There were 8,067 households and 6,618 families in the city. 48.9% had children under the age of 18 living in them. Of all households, 62.7% were married-couple households, 11.9% were households with a male householder and no spouse or partner present, and 20.8% were households with a female householder and no spouse or partner present. About 13.9% of all households were made up of individuals and 4.7% had someone living alone who was 65 years of age or older.

There were 8,308 housing units at an average density of 746.72 per square mile (288.3/km^{2}), and the population density was 2,253.82 inhabitants per square mile (870.2/km^{2}). Housing vacancies accounted for 2.9% of units; the homeowner vacancy rate was 1.1% and the rental vacancy rate was 4.5%.

Racial composition as of the 2020 census
| Race | Number | Percent |
|---|---|---|
| White | 13,081 | 52.2% |
| Black or African American | 3,183 | 12.7% |
| American Indian and Alaska Native | 166 | 0.7% |
| Asian | 3,830 | 15.3% |
| Native Hawaiian and Other Pacific Islander | 19 | 0.1% |
| Some other race | 2,072 | 8.3% |
| Two or more races | 2,725 | 10.9% |
| Hispanic or Latino (of any race) | 4,732 | 18.9% |

== Economy ==
Sugar Hill, as with the rest of Gwinnett County, has a sales tax of 6.0%, which comprises the 4.0% state sales tax and a 2.0% local tax.

On April 28, 2011, Governor Nathan Deal signed legislation that allowed individual local communities to vote on whether to allow alcohol sales on Sundays, which had previously been prohibited by the Georgia General Assembly since the 1800s. Supporters of the proposal to allow Sunday sales of alcohol argued that doing so would help the economy. A total of 97 cities and counties in Georgia held referendums on November 8, 2011, including Sugar Hill. The Sugar Hill city council voted to allow Sugar Hill residents vote on the issue and on November 15, 2011, Sugar Hill became one of several cities that voted to allow Sunday sales of alcohol. In 2012, the remaining areas of Gwinnett County that did not hold November 8 referendums voted to allow Sunday sales.

== Government ==
The city of Sugar Hill is governed by a mayor and five member city council.

When Sugar Hill was established in 1939, the town charter called for a mayor and five city councilmen, and that these elected officials were to be elected every two years. An amendment to the town's charter in 1952 changed the election process so that the mayor and three members of the town council are elected on even years for a term of two years, and two other members of the council are elected on odd years for a term of two years. In 1975, when the new charter was enacted that reincorporated the Town of Sugar Hill as the City of Sugar Hill, it added the requirement that a councilmen be appointed as mayor pro tempore, and retained the election method established in 1952.

The city's budget in 2012 was $28.2 million, and in 2013 was $19.4 million. In 2010, Sugar Hill approved the process of constructing a larger city hall to accommodate for the city's increase in population. The new city hall was completed and opened in January 2013.

Sugar Hill is part of Georgia's 9th congressional district The city is part of the Georgia State Senate's 45th and 48th districts, and the 99th, 100th, and 103rd districts for the Georgia House of Representatives.

== Education ==
Gwinnett county operates Gwinnett County Public Schools for K-12 students living in Sugar Hill. Sugar Hill Elementary, White Oak Elementary, Sycamore Elementary, Lanier Middle School and Lanier High School are the public schools serving the city of Sugar Hill residents. Portions of Sugar Hill also fall under the North Gwinnett district, encompassing Riverside Elementary, North Gwinnett Middle School, and North Gwinnett High School.

The Gwinnett County Public Library operates the Buford-Sugar Hill Branch in Buford.

== Media ==
As part of the Metro Atlanta area, Sugar Hill's primary network-affiliated television stations are WXIA-TV (NBC), WANF (CBS), WSB-TV (ABC), and WAGA-TV (Fox). WGTV is the local station of the statewide Georgia Public Television network and is a PBS member station.

Sugar Hill is served by the North Gwinnett Voice and Gwinnett Daily Post, which is the most widely distributed newspaper in Sugar Hill as well as Gwinnett County's legal organ. The Atlanta Journal-Constitution is also distributed in Sugar Hill. The weekly Gwinnett Herald served Sugar Hill from 1871 until 1885.

== Infrastructure ==
=== Roads and freeways ===
Sugar Hill's major road is State Route 20, which travels through Sugar Hill in a general northwest–southeast direction, going southeast into the adjoining city of Buford and northwest into Forsyth County. The nearest interstates are I-985 and I-85, which are both accessible via State Route 20 in Buford.

=== Pedestrians and cycling ===
- Sugar Hill Greenway (Under construction)
- Western Gwinnett Bikeway (Under construction)

=== Utilities ===
The city is a member of the Municipal Gas Authority of Georgia and manages the Sugar Hill Gas Department, which provides natural gas for the city's residents.

== Notable people ==
- Derrick Brown, NFL football player
- Zach Calzada, College football player
- Sion James, NBA basketball player
- Kurt Johnson, former NHRA pro stock driver
- Warren Johnson, former NHRA pro stock driver
- Daryl Mitchell, television and movie actor
