= Sugar Hill Greenway =

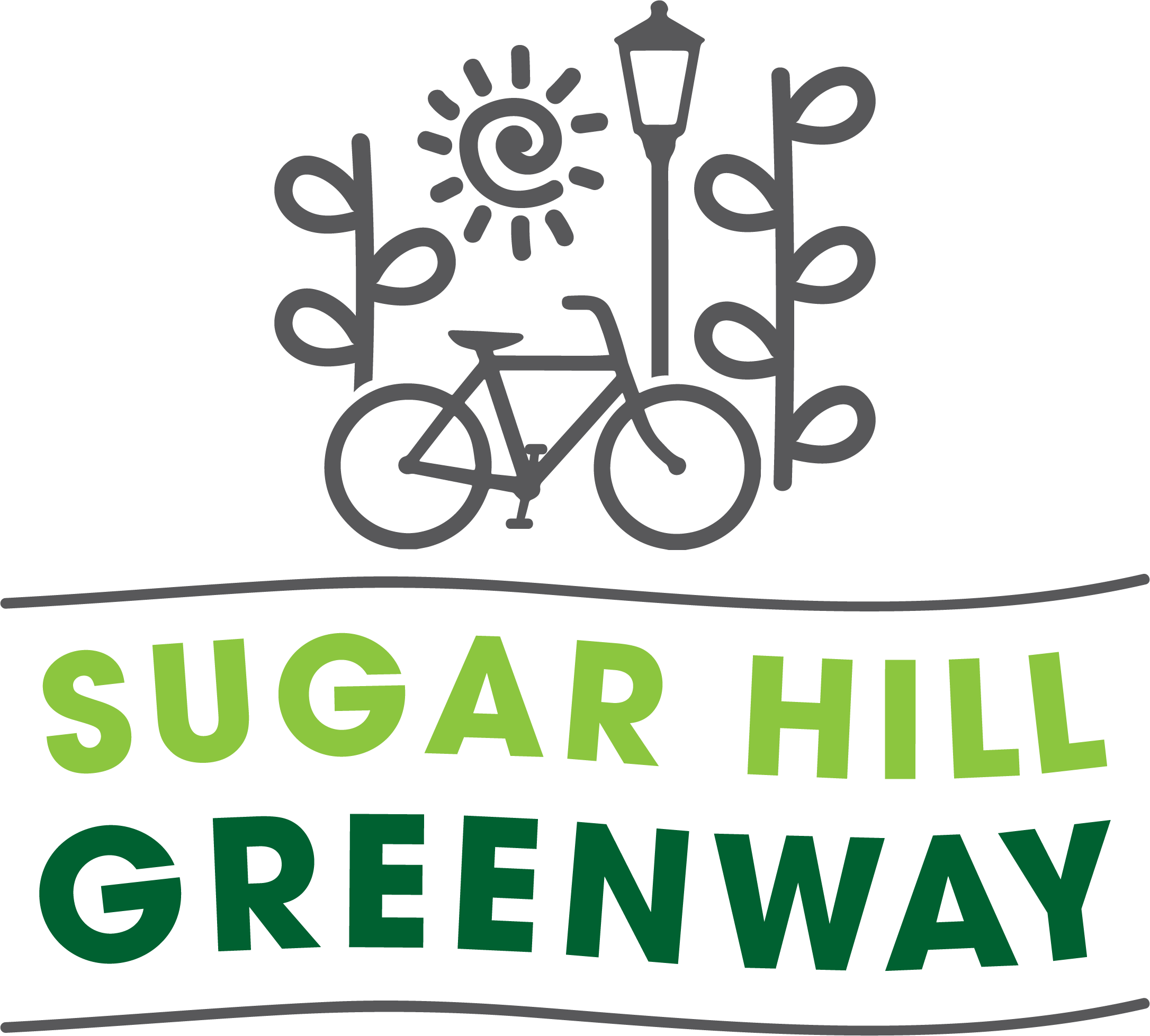
- Length: 16.5 miles (26.6 km)
- Location: Sugar Hill, Georgia, USA
- Established: 2016
- Trailheads: Sugar Hill (north) to; Western Gwinnett Bikeway (south)
- Use: Cycling and pedestrians
- Season: Year round
- Surface: Concrete
- Website: Sugar Hill Greenway

The Sugar Hill Greenway is a 16.5-mile (26.6 km) multi-use trail under construction in and around the city of Sugar Hill, Georgia, in the United States. Once complete, the trail will be 12 feet (3.7 m) wide and will connect Sugar Hill to the Western Gwinnett Bikeway.

The first phase of this project will be connecting the city’s downtown with the two parks on Level Creek and Peachtree Industrial Boulevard along with some new stops on Level Creek Road and Whitehead Road is in the final stages of design.

On February 27, 2018, the greenway was designated as one of the signature trails of Gwinnett County.

== Objectives ==
The greenway project of this size and scale will be transformative for Sugar Hill. Specifically, the city and its residents can expect to experience economic, health, environmental, transportation, and community benefits from the greenway’s development.

== Funding ==
Funding source consist of a combination of federal, state and local.

According to the AJC, total capital improvements for the city of Sugar Hill's FY2018 are at $7,196,717. Most of the funding is dedicated to the start of the Sugar Hill Greenway, sidewalk improvements along Suwanee Dam Road, Whitehead Road and Sycamore Road, transportation improvements as well as improvements to the historic downtown Sugar Hill Cemetery.

== See also ==
- Cycling infrastructure
- 10-Minute Walk
- Smart growth
- Walkability
