= Georgia's 96th House of Representatives district =

State district in Georgia, USA

Georgia's 96th State House of Representatives district
Representative
Arlene Beckles; D–Norcross
- Demographics: 22.9% White; 22.5% Black; 32.1% Hispanic; 20.4% Asian
- Population: 60,470

District 96 elects one member of the Georgia House of Representatives. It contains parts of Gwinnett County.

== Members ==
- Pedro Marin (2005–2025)
- Arlene Beckles (since 2025)
