= Donna McLeod =

Jamaican-born American politician from Georgia

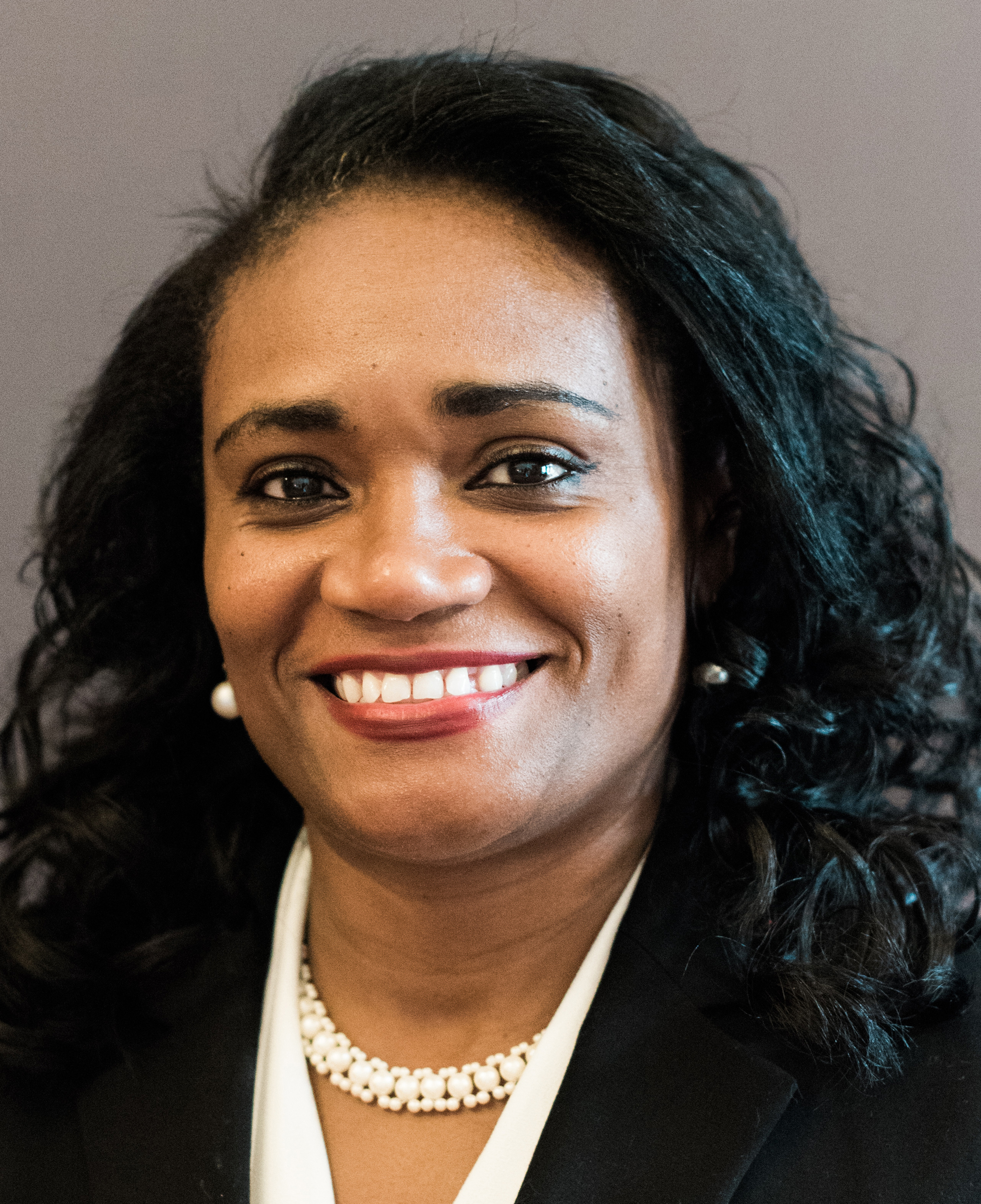
- Official portrait, 2019

Member of the Georgia House of Representatives from the 105th district
- In office January 14, 2019 – January 9, 2023
- Preceded by: Joyce Chandler
- Succeeded by: Segun Adeyina (Redistricting)

Personal details
- Born: March 19, 1968 (age 58) Kingston, Jamaica
- Party: Democratic
- Education: Humber College

Donna Theresa McLeod (born March 19, 1968) is a Jamaican-born American politician from Georgia. McLeod is a former member of the Georgia House of Representatives from the 105th District from 2019 to 2023. She is the first Jamaican-American to become a Representative in Georgia. She defeated Republican Donna Sheldon in the 2018 election to replace retiring Representative Joyce Chandler.

== Biography ==
=== Early life ===
On March 19, 1968, McLeod was born in Kingston, Jamaica. She migrated to Canada in 1977, where she grew up. In 1989, McLeod earned a bachelor's degree in chemical engineering from Humber College. She moved to Georgia in 1998 and became a US citizen in 2012.

=== Career ===
She served as the Committee Chair for Voter Outreach and Outreach for the Gwinnett County Democratic Party and continues to be an active member of the Gwinnett Democrats.

McLeod was a grassroots organizer for Senator Obama’s 2008 campaign. In 2012, she was National Director for Voter Outreach for Black Women for Obama.

In 2016, she ran for State House Representative, District 105, in Gwinnett County, GA. McLeod was endorsed by President Barack Obama. She lost the general election to incumbent Joyce Chandler by 222 votes. McLeod ran again for State House Representative, District 105 in 2018. On November 6, 2018, she was elected State Representative for District 105, defeating Republican Donna Sheldon and securing over 4000 votes. In 2018, she received the endorsements of both President Barack Obama and Attorney General Eric Holder. In 2020, she ran for a third time and defeated Erik Dieks.

McLeod sat on the following committees:

- Code Revision
- Human Relations & Aging
- Interstate Cooperation
- Science and Technology

During the 2019 Legislative Session, Representative McLeod worked with the Department of Corrections and the Department of Community Services to update their release documents to ensure that Ex-Felons that have served their time will be informed that their Voting Rights are restored.

McLeod is a chemical engineer with over 30 years of experience in quality assurance management/ engineering; she is now the president/CEO of Enviroqual, LLC, a quality assurance/regulatory consulting company specializing in medical devices, food, plastics, and pharmaceuticals.

McLeod is a co-founder of C.A.N.I, Inc., (Community Action Network Initiatives) a non-profit 501c3 organization that helps educate and inform people of their civic and societal rights and responsibilities.

== Personal life ==
McLeod is a non-practicing Catholic.

== Electoral history ==
2016 Democratic primary: Georgia House of Representatives, District 105
Party	Candidate	Votes	%
Democratic	Donna McLeod	638	67.37%
Democratic	Perry Green	309	32.63%

2016 general election: Georgia House of Representatives, District 105
Party	Candidate	Votes	%
Republican	Joyce Chandler	12,411	50.45%
Democratic	Donna McLeod	12,189	49.55%

In 2018, Mcleod was unopposed in the Democratic primary for the District 105 seat.

2018 general election: Georgia House of Representatives, District 105
Party	Candidate	Votes	%
Democratic	Donna McLeod	14,335	58.4%
Republican	Donna Sheldon	10,224	41.6%

== Awards ==
She was awarded the Georgia Secretary of State Outstanding Citizen Award in 2015, RevUp’s Sankofa Leadership in 2017, Gwinnett County Democratic Party Leadership/Service Award in 2017, and Freedom Fighter Award from the Family in 2018. She also sits on the STEM Board at Discovery High School.</ref>

In December 2022, Donna McLeod was recognized by the Jamaican Museum and Cultural Center (JMCC) in Atlanta for her outstanding representation as a leader and mentor to her constituents as the first Jamaican-American to become a Representative in the state of Georgia.

== Gallery ==
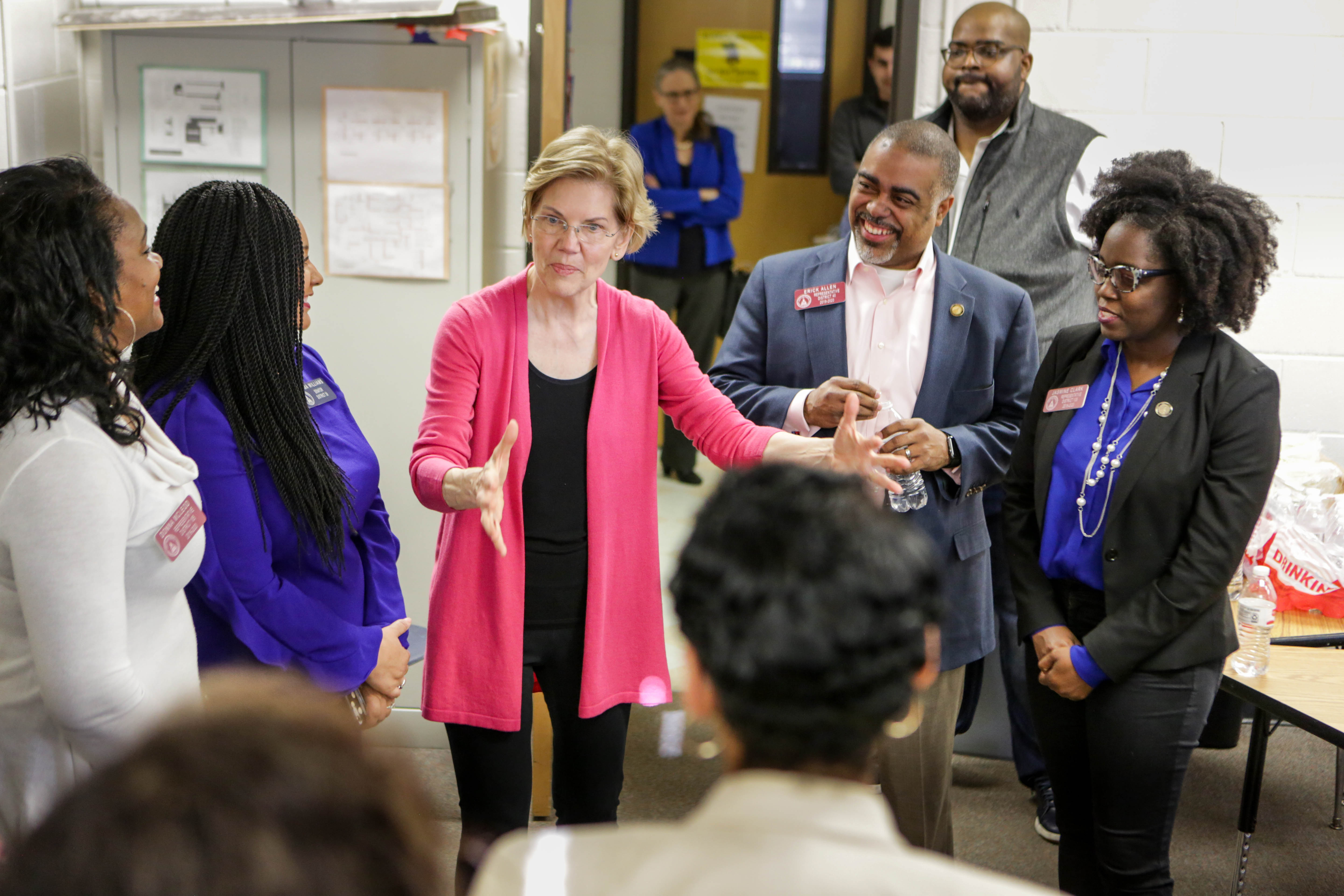
McLeod (far left) and other Georgia state politicians meet with Elizabeth Warren in 2019

Georgia House of Representatives
Preceded by Joyce Chandler	Member of the Georgia House of Representatives from the 105th district 2019–2023	Succeeded by Farooq Mughal
