= Georgia's 98th House of Representatives district =

State district in Georgia, USA

Georgia's 96th State House of Representatives district
Representative
Marvin Lim; D–Norcross
- Demographics: 57.9% White; 13.3% Black; 18.2% Hispanic; 8.3% Asian
- Population: 59,741

District 96 elects one member of the Georgia House of Representatives. It contains parts of Gwinnett County.

== Members ==
- David Clark (2015–2023)
- Marvin Lim (since 2023)
