= Dan Lakly =

American politician

Member of the Georgia House of Representatives from the 105th district
- In office 1992–1998
- In office 2004–2007

Personal details
- Born: 1942
- Died: October 29, 2007 (aged 65)
- Party: Republican

Dan Lakly (1942 – October 29, 2007) was an American politician from the Republican Party of Georgia.

== Biography ==
Lakly was born as the son of Yugoslavian immigrants. He served on Peachtree City Council in the 1980s. He was elected to the General Assembly in 1992 in District 105 before losing the Republican primary in 1998 to Kathy Cox. He was re-elected in 2004 and 2006. In total Lakly served five terms in the Georgia House of Representatives. In 2007, Lakly died from a heart attack at the age of 65. Dan Lakly Drive in Peachtree is named after him.
