= Donna Sheldon =

American politician

Member of the Georgia House of Representatives from the 71st district
- In office January 3, 2003 – January 3, 2007

Member of the Georgia House of Representatives from the 105th district
- In office January 3, 2007 – January 14, 2013
- Preceded by: David E. Lucas, Sr.
- Succeeded by: Joyce Chandler

Member of the Georgia House of Representatives from the 104th district
- In office January 14, 2013 – August 27, 2013
- Succeeded by: Chuck Efstration

Personal details
- Party: Republican
- Occupation: Politician

Donna Sheldon is an American politician from the state of Georgia. Sheldon is a former Republican member of Georgia House of Representatives for District 104.

== Education ==
In 1984, Sheldon earned a degree in Science from Gainesville College.

== Career ==
Sheldon is a founder and former director of Dacula Classical Academy in Georgia.

On November 5, 2002, Sheldon won the election unopposed and became a Republican member of Georgia House of Representatives for District 71.

On November 2, 2004, Sheldon won the election and became a Republican member of Georgia House of Representatives for District 105. Sheldon defeated John Kenney with 78.36% of the votes.

On November 6, 2012, Sheldon won the election unopposed and became a Republican member of Georgia House of Representatives for District 104.

On August 26, 2013, Sheldon announced her resignation from Georgia House of Representatives to focus on her campaign as a candidate for Georgia's 10th congressional district to replace Paul Broun. On May 20, 2014, Sheldon finished third in the race for Georgia's 10th congressional district after receiving 15% of the vote, as Jody Hice and Mike Collins advanced to a runoff election.

In 2018, as a real estate agent, Sheldon campaigned for a seat in Georgia House of Representatives. On November 6, 2018, Sheldon lost the election for Georgia House of Representatives for District 105. Sheldon was defeated by Donna McLeod and received only 41.63% of the votes.

== Personal life ==
Sheldon's husband is Bob. They have two children. Sheldon and her family live in Dacula, Georgia.
