= Rest Haven, Georgia =

- Town
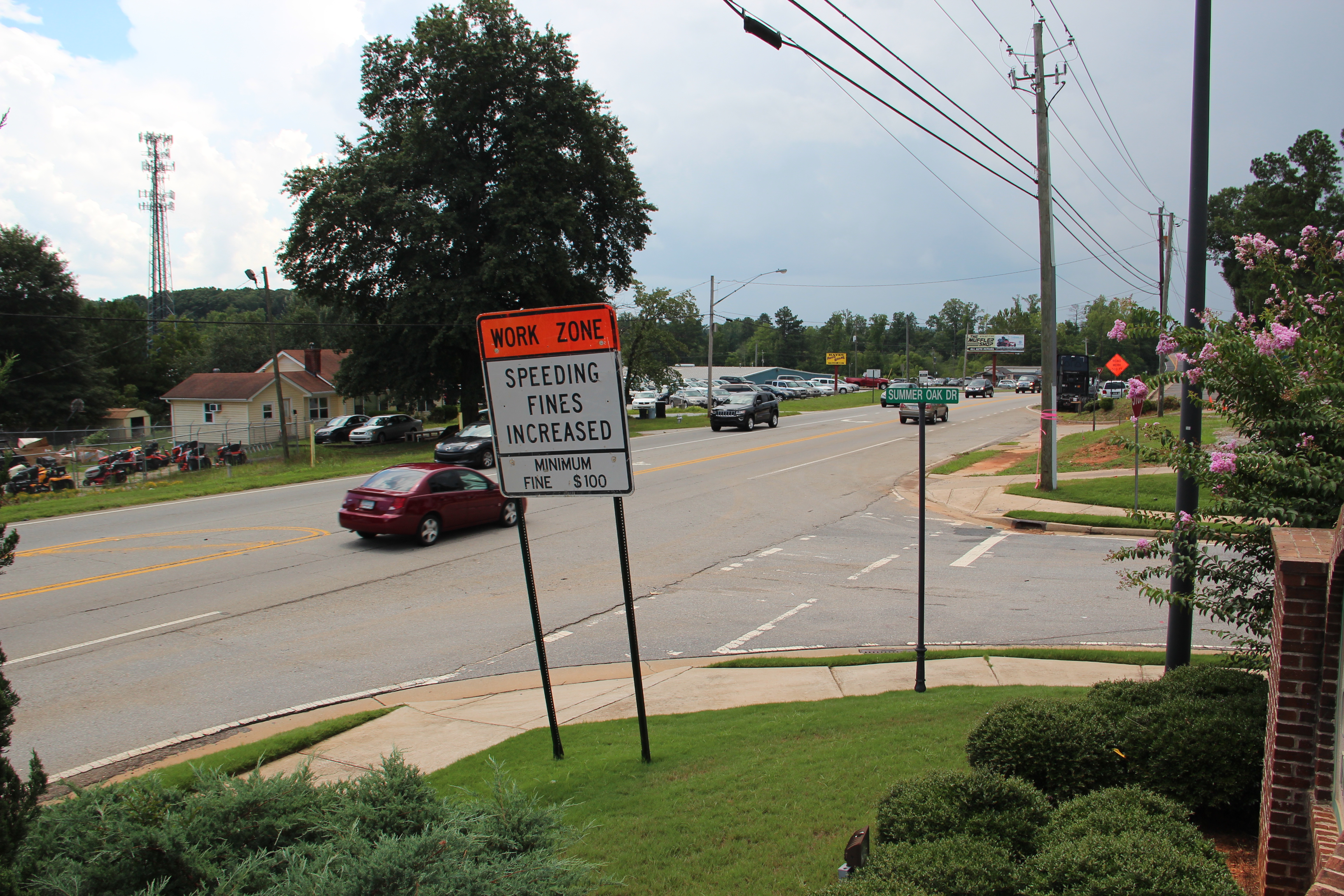
- Georgia State Route 13 in Rest Haven

- Location in Gwinnett County and the state of Georgia

- Location in Metro Atlanta
- Coordinates: 34°7′59″N 83°58′36″W
- Country: United States
- State: Georgia
- Counties: Gwinnett, Hall

Government
  - Mayor: Kenneth Waycaster
  - City Clerk: Monica Montgomery

Area
  - Total: 0.15 sq mi (0.40 km^{2})
  - Land: 0.15 sq mi (0.40 km^{2})
  - Water: 0 sq mi (0.00 km^{2})
- Elevation: 1,099 ft (335 m)

Population (2020)
  - Total: 45
  - Density: 291.0/sq mi (112.34/km^{2})
- Time zone: UTC-5 (Eastern (EST))
  - Summer (DST): UTC-4 (EDT)
- FIPS code: 13-64792
- GNIS feature ID: 332834

Rest Haven is a town primarily in northern Gwinnett and partly in southern Hall counties in the U.S. state of Georgia. As of 2020, its population was 45.

Rest Haven is located along Georgia State Route 13, a highway from Atlanta to Gainesville that is immediately west of Interstate 985. The Gwinnett County portion of Rest Haven is part of the Atlanta–Sandy Springs–Marietta, GA-AL metropolitan statistical area, while the Hall County portion is part of the Gainesville, GA metropolitan statistical area.

== History ==
The town was granted a municipal charter in 1938.

It was announced on September 19, 2005, that the town leaders wished to be annexed into Buford, a much larger city which surrounds Rest Haven except on the north. A previous attempt to do so in 2001 ended in a lawsuit and a judge ordered Rest Haven to remain a city. Some property owners have already de-annexed from the town and annexed into Buford. ()

State law prohibits annexation of one city into another, so the town would first have to vote in a referendum to dissolve. It would then go through the annexation process, requiring approval of the Buford city council and a second referendum of the former Rest Haven residents.

Additional legal battles ensued in 2015 by some local residents' request to be annexed by Buford, which was granted.

As of 2022, the city of Rest Haven still exists with Kenneth Waycaster serving as Mayor. All planning, zoning, utilities, and permitting services are provided by Buford.

== Geography ==
According to the United States Census Bureau, the town has a total area of 0.4 square miles (1.0 km^{2}), all land.

== Demographics ==
Historical population
Census	Pop.	Note	%±
1940	91		—
1950	147		61.5%
1960	167		13.6%
1970	188		12.6%
1980	231		22.9%
1990	176		−23.8%
2000	151		−14.2%
2010	62		−58.9%
2020	45		−27.4%
U.S. Decennial Census; 1850-1870 1870-1880; 1890-1910 1920-1930; 1940 1950 1960; 1970 1980 1990; 2000 2010 2020

Rest Haven town, Georgia – Racial and ethnic composition Note: the US Census treats Hispanic/Latino as an ethnic category. This table excludes Latinos from the racial categories and assigns them to a separate category. Hispanics/Latinos may be of any race.
Race / Ethnicity (NH = Non-Hispanic)	Pop 2000	Pop 2010	Pop 2020	% 2000	% 2010	% 2020
White alone (NH)	136	54	29	90.07%	87.10%	64.44%
Black or African American alone (NH)	4	1	5	2.65%	1.61%	11.11%
Native American or Alaska Native alone (NH)	0	0	0	0.00%	0.00%	0.00%
Asian alone (NH)	1	0	3	0.66%	0.00%	6.67%
Native Hawaiian or Pacific Islander alone (NH)	0	0	0	0.00%	0.00%	0.00%
Other race alone (NH)	0	0	0	0.00%	0.00%	0.00%
Mixed race or Multiracial (NH)	4	1	2	2.65%	1.61%	4.44%
Hispanic or Latino (any race)	6	6	6	3.97%	9.68%	13.33%
Total	151	62	45	100.00%	100.00%	100.00%

=== 2000 census ===
As of the census of 2000, there were 151 people, 57 households, and 42 families residing in the town. The population density was 145.8/km^{2} (373.5/mi.²). There were 67 housing units at an average density of 64.7/km^{2} (165.7/mi.²). The racial makeup of the town was 90.07% White, 2.65% African American, 0.66% Asian, 3.97% from other races, and 2.65% from two or more races. Hispanic or Latino of any race were 3.97% of the population.

There were 57 households, out of which 28.1% had children under the age of 18 living with them, 63.2% were married couples living together, 8.8% had a female householder with no husband present, and 24.6% were non-families. 22.8% of all households were made up of individuals, and 14.0% had someone living alone who was 65 years of age or older. The average household size was 2.65 and the average family size was 3.07.

In the town, the population was spread out, with 25.2% under the age of 18, 11.3% from 18 to 24, 24.5% from 25 to 44, 24.5% from 45 to 64, and 14.6% who were 65 years of age or older. The median age was 35 years. For every 100 females, there were 101.3 males. For every 100 females age 18 and over, there were 85.2 males.

The median income for a household in the town was $50,156, and the median income for a family was $51,250. Males had a median income of $31,875 versus $25,781 for females. The per capita income for the town was $15,275. There were 11.8% of families and 12.9% of the population living below the poverty line, including 13.5% of under eighteens and 14.3% of those over 64.
