= Georgia's 99th House of Representatives district =

State district in Georgia, USA

Georgia's 99th State House of Representatives district
Representative
| Matt Reeves; R–Duluth |
- Demographics: 14.0% White; 21.9% Black; 51.5% Hispanic; 10.6% Asian
- Population: 54,482

District 99 elects one member of the Georgia House of Representatives. It contains parts of Gwinnett County.

== Members ==
- Hugh Floyd (2002–2017)
- Brenda Lopez Romero (2017–2021)
- Marvin Lim (2021–2023)
- Matt Reeves (since 2023)
