= Georgia's 105th House of Representatives district =

American legislative district

Georgia's 105th State House of Representatives district
Representative
Sandy Donatucci; R

Georgia's 105th House district elects one member of the Georgia House of Representatives. Its current representative is Republican Sandy Donatucci.

== Elected representatives ==
Representative	Party	Years of service	Hometown	Notes
Dan Lakly	Republican	1993-1999	Peachtree City, Georgia	
Kathy Cox	Republican	1999–2003	Peachtree City, Georgia	
David E. Lucas, Sr.	Democrat	2003-2005		
Donna Sheldon	Republican	2005–2013	Dacula, Georgia	
Joyce Chandler	Republican	2013–2019	Grayson	
Donna McLeod	Democrat	2019–2023	Lawrenceville	
Farooq Mughal	Democrat	2023–2025	Dacula	
Sandy Donatucci	Republican	2025–present	Buford	
