= Mulberry, Georgia =

City in Gwinnett County, Georgia, U.S.

Mulberry
- City
- City of Mulberry
- Location in Gwinnett County and the State of Georgia
- Interactive map of Mulberry
- Coordinates: 34.053410°N 83.885844°W
- Country: United States
- State: Georgia
- County: Gwinnett
- Incorporated: 2024
- Named for: Mulberry trees

Government
  - Type: Mayor-council
  - Body: City Council
  - Mayor: Michael Coker

Area
  - Total: 27.990 sq mi (72.495 km^{2})
  - Land: 27.750 sq mi (71.873 km^{2})
  - Water: 0.240 sq mi (0.622 km^{2})
- Elevation: 932 ft (284 m)

Population (2020)
  - Total: 39,560
- Time zone: UTC-5 (Eastern (EST))
  - Summer (DST): UTC-4 (EDT)
- ZIP codes: 30011,30019,30046, 30517,30519,30548
- GNIS feature ID: 2832427
- Website: https://www.mulberryga.gov/

Mulberry is a city in northeastern Gwinnett County, in the U.S. state of Georgia. It was created in 2024. As of the 2020 census, the city had a population of 39,560 in the areas it first incorporated. It is now around 28 square miles (73 km^{2}), making it the largest city in Gwinnett County by total area.

== History ==
On January 8, 2024, Georgia State House Majority Leader, Chuck Efstration, introduced legislation that would pave the way for the creation of the city of Mulberry located in Gwinnett County, unrelated to the already established unincorporated Mulberry located nearby in Barrow County. Efstration’s office worked with KB Advisory Group to develop a feasibility study for prospective cityhood.

The proposal faced both support and criticism from local residents. Additionally, the Gwinnett County government opposed the creation of the city on financial and legal grounds. Mulberry cityhood was approved as a "city lite" that would never have a millage rate in a vote of 56.96% on May 21, 2024 in an election held that day.

On January 1, 2025, the City of Mulberry began operations with Michael Coker elected as the city's first mayor.

On February 10, 2025, SB138 and SB139 were introduced in the Georgia Senate which sought to modify the funding of services within the city and expand the city's area respectively. SB138 required Gwinnett County to continue to pay for some city services for a two-year transition period back-dated to January 1, 2025. Furthermore, the bill established legal consequences if Gwinnett County were found not upholding these requirements. Proponents argued the bill would streamline the operations of new cities and ensure the continuity of services. Gwinnett County opposed this measure arguing that the bill was "a dangerous precedent for other counties across the state of Georgia". Both bills would later pass and be signed into law on May 14, 2025.
