= Georgia Legal Services Program =

Georgia Legal Services Program was founded in 1971 by members of the Young Lawyers Section of The Georgia State Bar Association. However the program was initially unaffiliated with the state bar. The program provides low income individuals with access to representation in healthcare, housing, education, farmers rights, and public benefits.

== Offices ==
Georgia Legal Services has offices in Albany, Athens, Augusta, Brunswick, Columbus, Dalton, Gainesville, Macon, Piedmont, Savannah, and Valdosta

== History ==
In 1969 the United States Department of Health, Education, and Welfare mandated that every state include legal services so that welfare recipients receive fair representation in hearings. This enabled states like Georgia to establish free legal aid services.
