= Arlene Beckles =

American politician

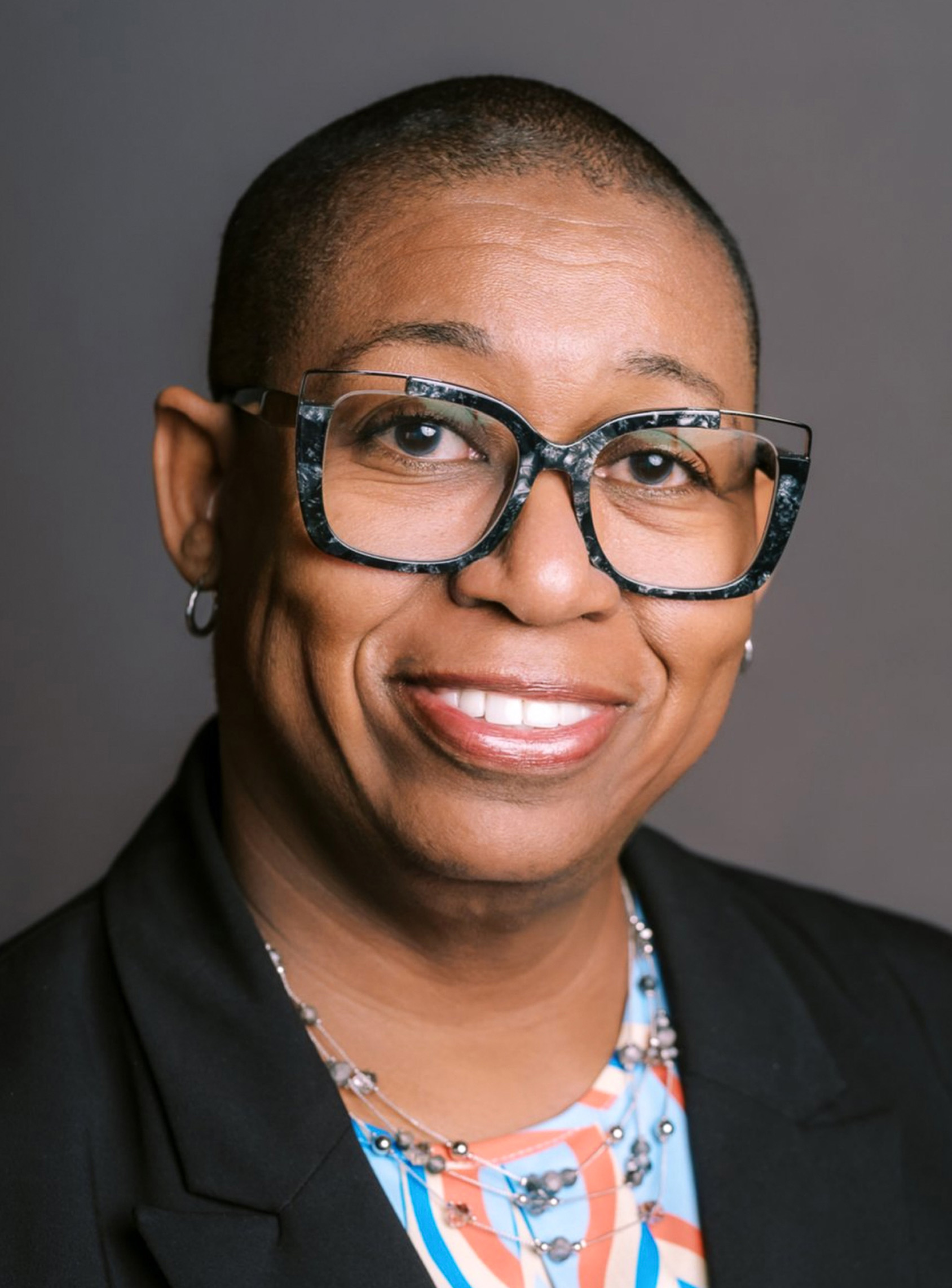
- Official portrait, 2025

Member of the Georgia House of Representatives from the 96th district
- Incumbent
- Assumed office January 13, 2025
- Succeeded by: Pedro Marin

Personal details
- Born: August 3, 1963 (age 63)
- Party: Democratic

Arlene Patricia Beckles (born August 3, 1963) is an American politician of Barbadian origin who was elected member of the Georgia House of Representatives for the 96th district in 2024.

She is a former Norcross City Council member.
