= Joyce Chandler =

American educator and politician from Georgia

Member of the Georgia House of Representatives from the 105th district
- In office 2013 – January 14, 2019
- Preceded by: Donna Sheldon
- Succeeded by: Donna McLeod

Personal details
- Born: 1939 (age 86–87) Georgia, United States
- Party: Republican
- Spouse: Martin Chandler
- Education: Samford University, Auburn University, Georgia State University, University of Georgia
- Occupation: Educator, politician

Joyce Chandler is an American former educator and politician from Georgia. Chandler is a former Republican member of the Georgia House of Representatives representing District 105 from 2013 until January 14, 2019. Chandler has sponsored 125 bills.

== Early life ==
In 1939, Chandler was born in Georgia.

== Education ==
Chandler earned a Bachelor of Arts degree in English and Social Studies from Samford University. Chandler earned a Masters of Science degree in School Counseling from Auburn University. Chandler earned an Education Specialist degree in Counseling from Georgia State University. Chandler earned a doctorate degree in Education Counseling from the University of Georgia.

== Career ==
Chandler is a former teacher and school counselor in Georgia.

On November 6, 2012, Chandler won the election and became a Republican member of Georgia House of Representatives for District 105. Chandler defeated Renita Hamilton with 51.35% of the votes. On November 4, 2014, as an incumbent, Chandler won the election and continued serving District 105. Chandler defeated Renita Hamilton with 52.78% of the votes. On November 8, 2016, as an incumbent, Chandler won the election and continued serving District 105. Chandler defeated Donna McLeod with 50.45% of the votes.

In 2018, Chandler confirmed that she would not seek re-election for Georgia House of Representatives.

== Awards ==
- 2016 Legislator of the Year. Named by Gwinnett County Public Schools. Inaugural winner.
- 2016 State Representative of the Year. Presented by Georgia Life Alliance at the Life at the Party for HB 555.

== Personal life ==
Chandler's husband is Martin Chandler, a retired accountant. They have two children. Chandler and her family live in Grayson, Georgia.
