= Marvin Lim =

American politician (born 1984)

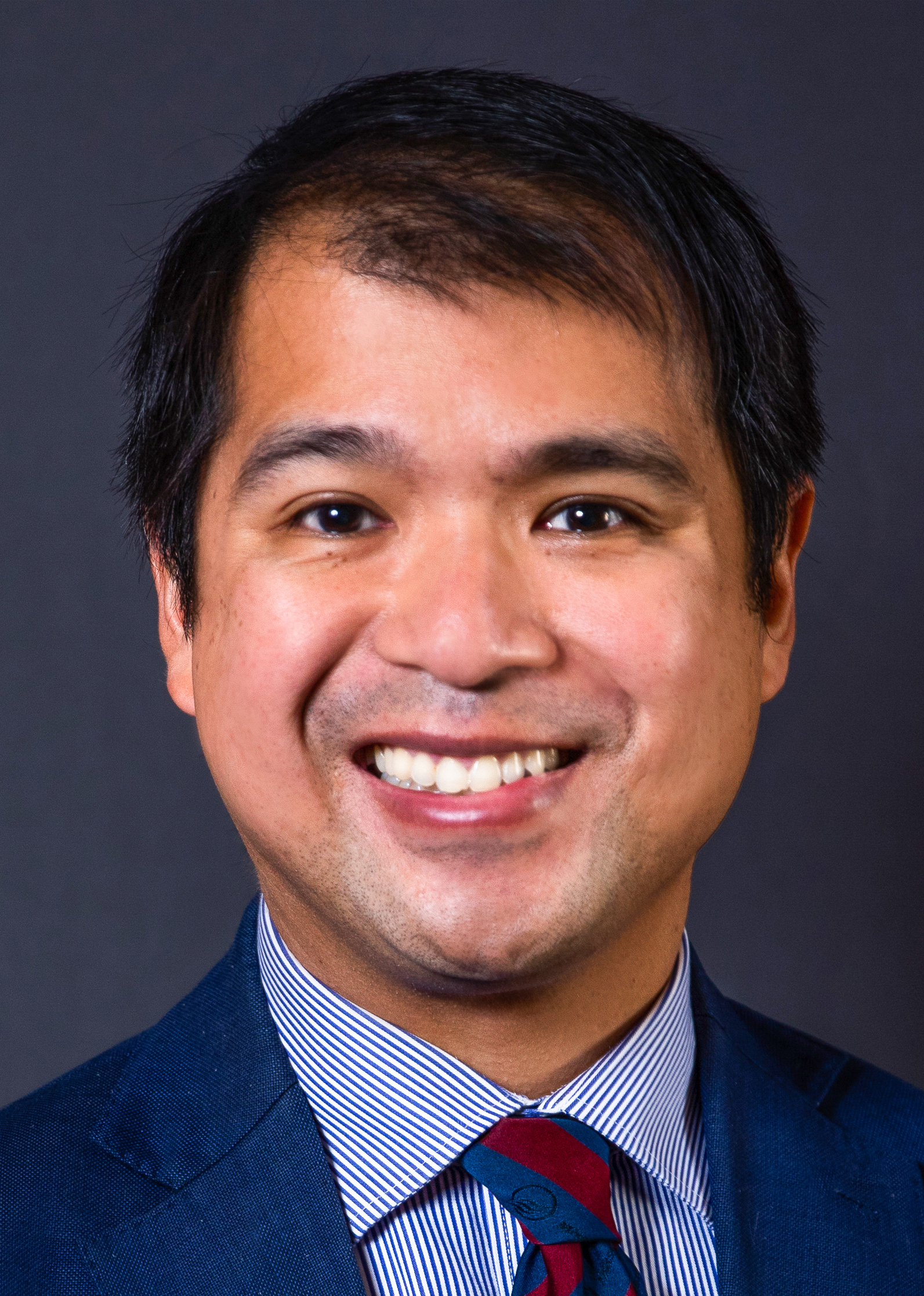
- Official portrait, 2021

Member of the Georgia House of Representatives
- Incumbent
- Assumed office January 11, 2021
- Preceded by: Brenda Lopez Romero
- Constituency: 99th District (2021–2023); 98th District (2023–Present)

Personal details
- Born: Marvin Certeza Lim; April 7, 1984 (age 42) Philippines
- Party: Democratic
- Education: Emory University (BA); Yale Law School (JD)

Marvin Certeza Lim (born April 7, 1984) is an American attorney and politician from Georgia. Lim is a Democratic member of Georgia House of Representatives for District 98.

== Early life and career ==
Lim was born in the Philippines and immigrated to Atlanta, Georgia at the age of 7. He graduated from Emory University with a Bachelor of Arts and from Yale Law School with a Juris Doctor. He currently works on securities litigation as an attorney at Holcomb + Ward, LLP— which fellow state representative Scott Holcomb is a partner of.

== Personal life ==
Lim is openly gay and part of the AAPI Legislative Caucus in the Georgia General Assembly.

Georgia House of Representatives
Preceded by Brenda Lopez Romero	Member of the Georgia House of Representatives from the 99th district 2021–2023	Succeeded by Matt Reeves
Preceded by David Clark	Member of the Georgia House of Representatives from the 98th district 2023–Present	Incumbent
