= Matt Reeves (politician) =

American politician

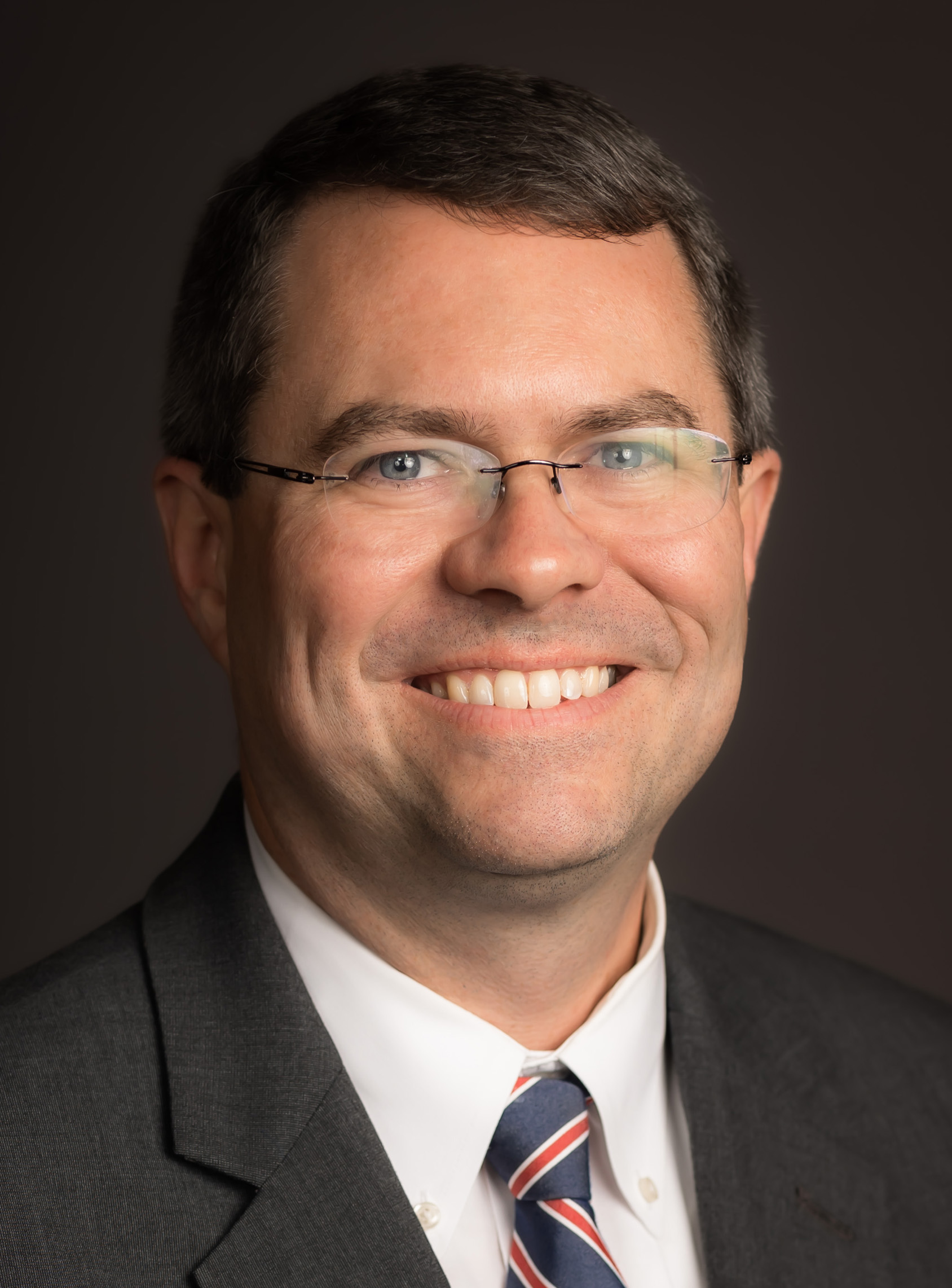
- Official headshot

Member of the Georgia House of Representatives from the 99th district
- Incumbent
- Assumed office January 9, 2023
- Preceded by: Marvin Lim (redistricting)

Personal details
- Party: Republican
- Education: Mercer University (B.A.); University of Georgia (J.D.)
- Occupation: Attorney, Politician
- Website: https://reevesforhouse.com/

Robert Matthew Reeves is an American politician who has been a member of the Georgia House of Representatives from the 99th district since 2022.
