= Chuck Efstration =

American politician

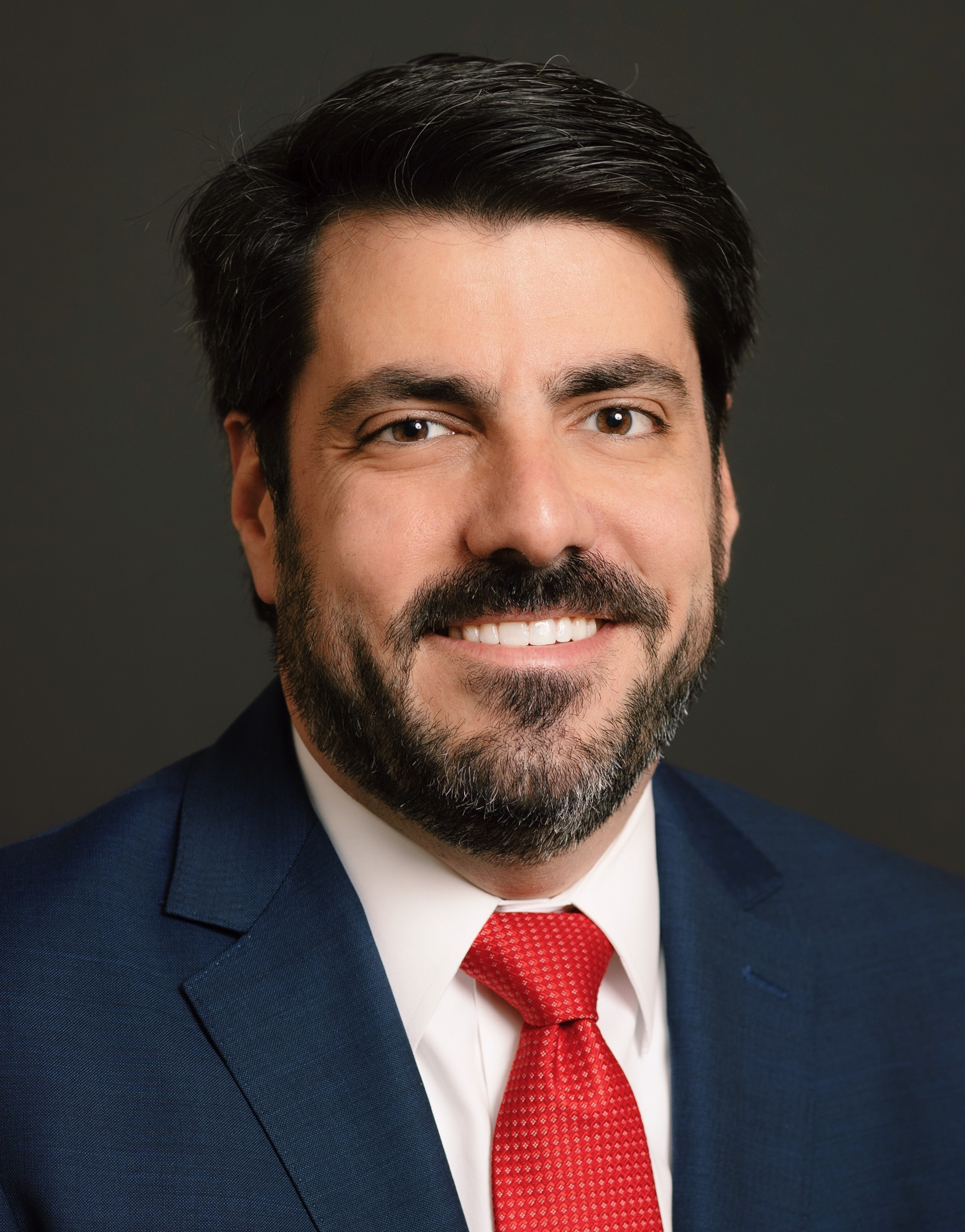
- Official headshot

Majority Leader of the Georgia House of Representatives
- Incumbent
- Assumed office January 9, 2023
- Preceded by: Jon G. Burns

Member of the Georgia House of Representatives from the 104th district
- Incumbent
- Assumed office December 13, 2013
- Preceded by: Donna Sheldon

Personal details
- Born: Charles Paul Efstration III; April 24, 1983 (age 43) Mulberry, Georgia, U.S.
- Party: Republican
- Spouse: Ashley Efstration
- Children: 2
- Education: University of Georgia (BA); Mercer University (JD)

Charles Paul Efstration III (born April 24, 1983) is a Republican member of the Georgia House of Representatives from the 104th District, serving since 2013. In 2022, Efstration was elected Majority Leader.

== Career ==
In 2008, Efstration became an Assistant District Attorney of Gwinnett County Judicial Circuit, until 2013. In 2013, Efstration was an attorney at Efstration Law Firm, Professional Corporation, until 2018.

On November 5, 2013, Efstration and Teresa Cantrell were top candidates in the election and required a runoff. On December 3, 2013, Efstration won the special runoff election and became a Republican member of the Georgia House of Representatives for District 104. Efstration defeated Teresa Cantrell with 64.57% of the votes. On November 3, 2020, as an incumbent, Efstration won the election and continued serving District 104. Efstration defeated Nakita Hemingway with 51.15% of the votes. He previously ran for the United States House of Representatives in Georgia's 7th congressional district in 2010.

Efstration was a sponsor of a hate crimes law allowing for the imposition of extra penalties to criminals motivated by a victim's race, color, religion, national origin, sex, sexual orientation, gender or disability, which passed after the murder of Ahmaud Arbery.

In 2018, Efstration became an attorney at McGarity and Efstration.

== Personal life ==
Efstration's wife is Ashley Efstration. They have two children.

Georgia House of Representatives
Preceded by Jon G. Burns	Majority Leader of the Georgia House of Representatives; 2023–present	Incumbent
