= Pedro Marin (politician) =

American politician

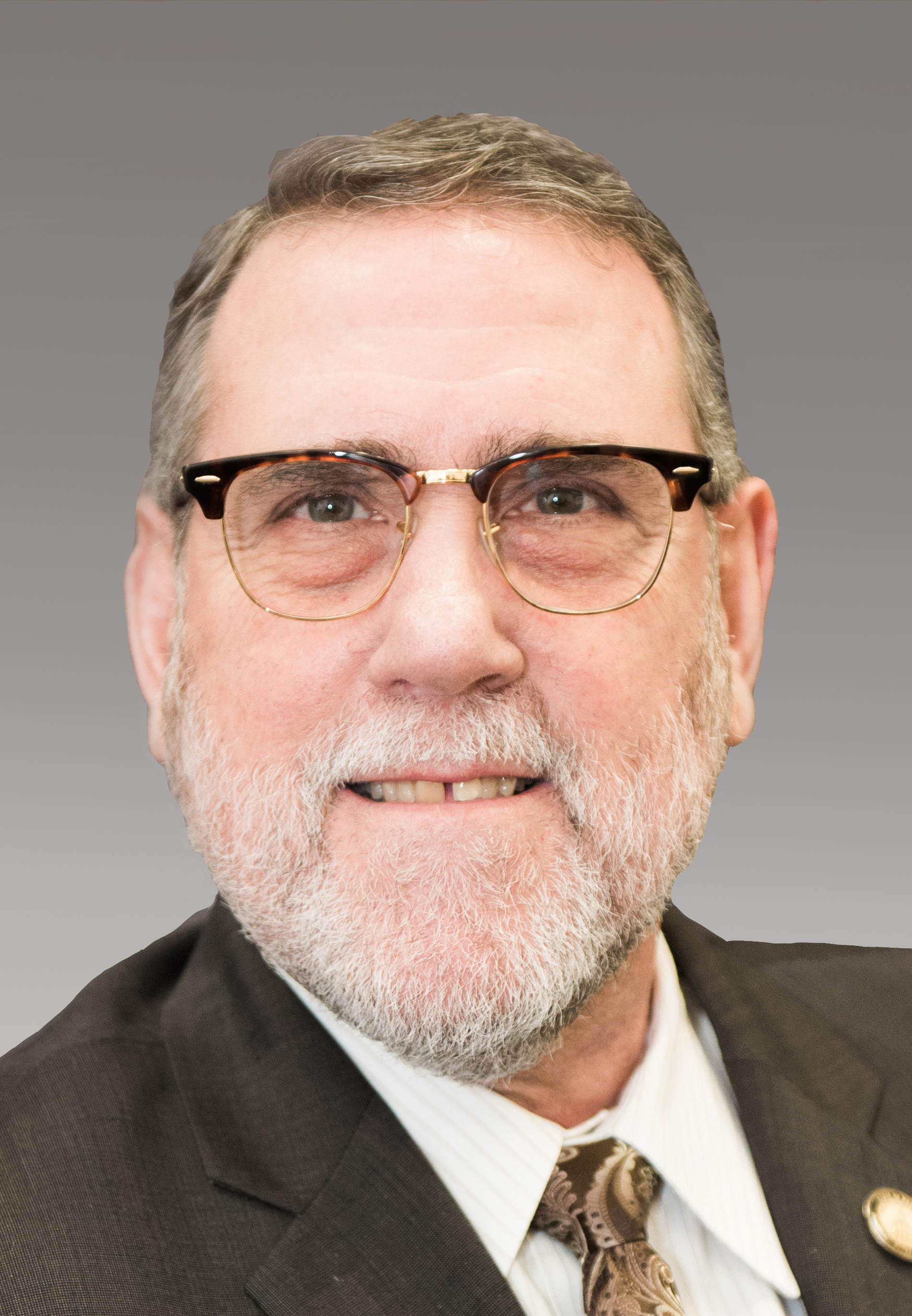

Member of the Georgia House of Representatives
- In office January 13, 2003 – January 13, 2025
- Preceded by: District established
- Succeeded by: Arlene Beckles
- Constituency: 66th district (2003–2005); 96th district (2005–2025)

Personal details
- Born: Pedro Rafael Marin; March 30, 1958 (age 68)
- Party: Democratic
- Spouse: Nereida

Pedro Rafael Marin (born March 30, 1958) is an American politician. He was a member of the Georgia House of Representatives, from 2003 to 2025. He is a member of the Democratic Party.
