= List of city and town halls in the United States =

This is a list of city and town halls in the United States.

== Alabama ==
=== Former ===
- Mobile City Hall

== Arizona ==
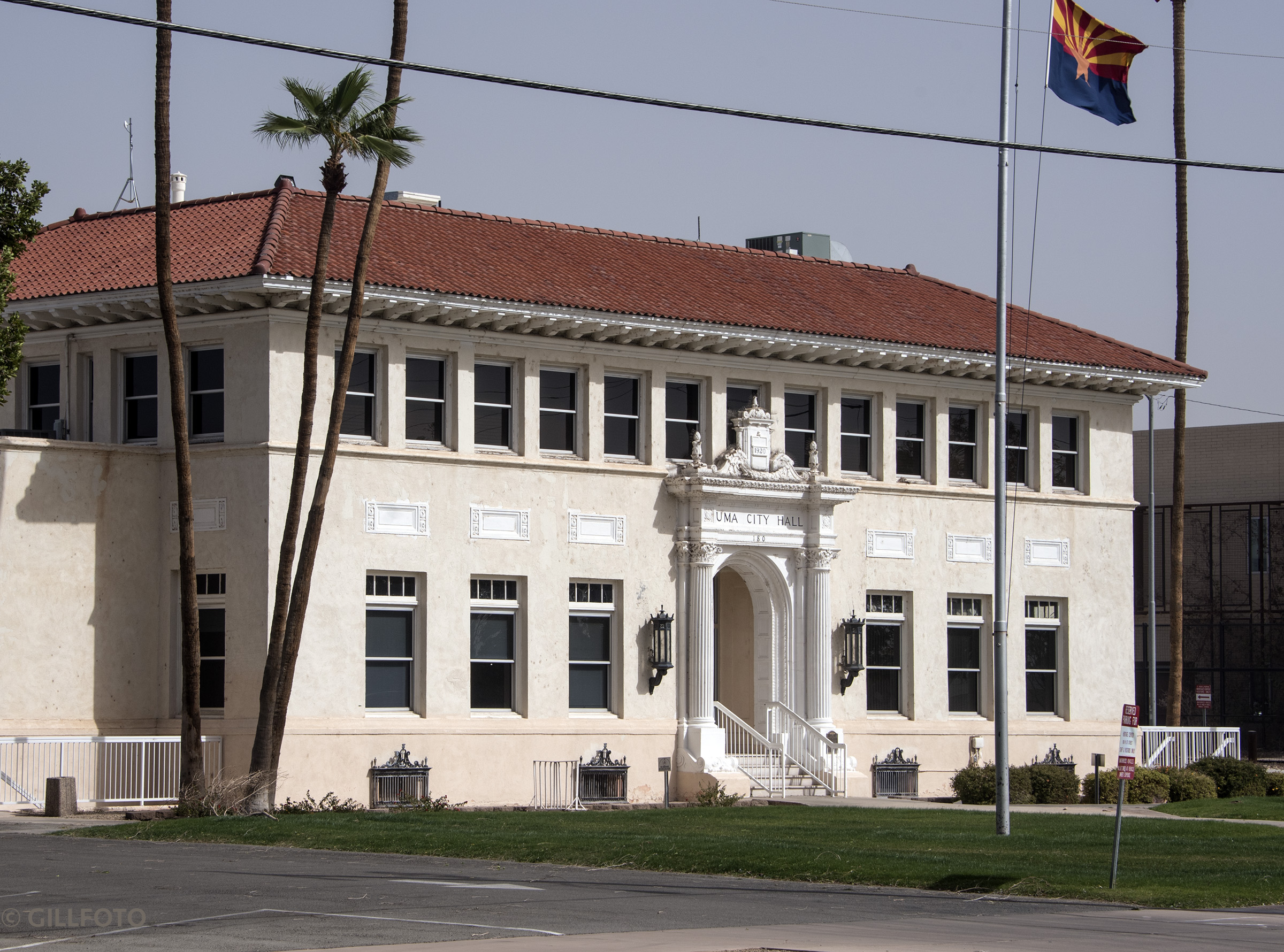
Yuma's City Hall is constructed with Spanish Colonial Revival architecture referencing the Spanish colonial period of Arizona's history

- Phoenix City Hall
- Yuma City Hall

=== Former ===
- Maricopa County Courthouse (formerly Phoenix's City Hall)

== Arkansas ==
- El Dorado Municipal Building
- Eudora City Hall
- Little Rock City Hall
- Texarkana Municipal Building

== California ==
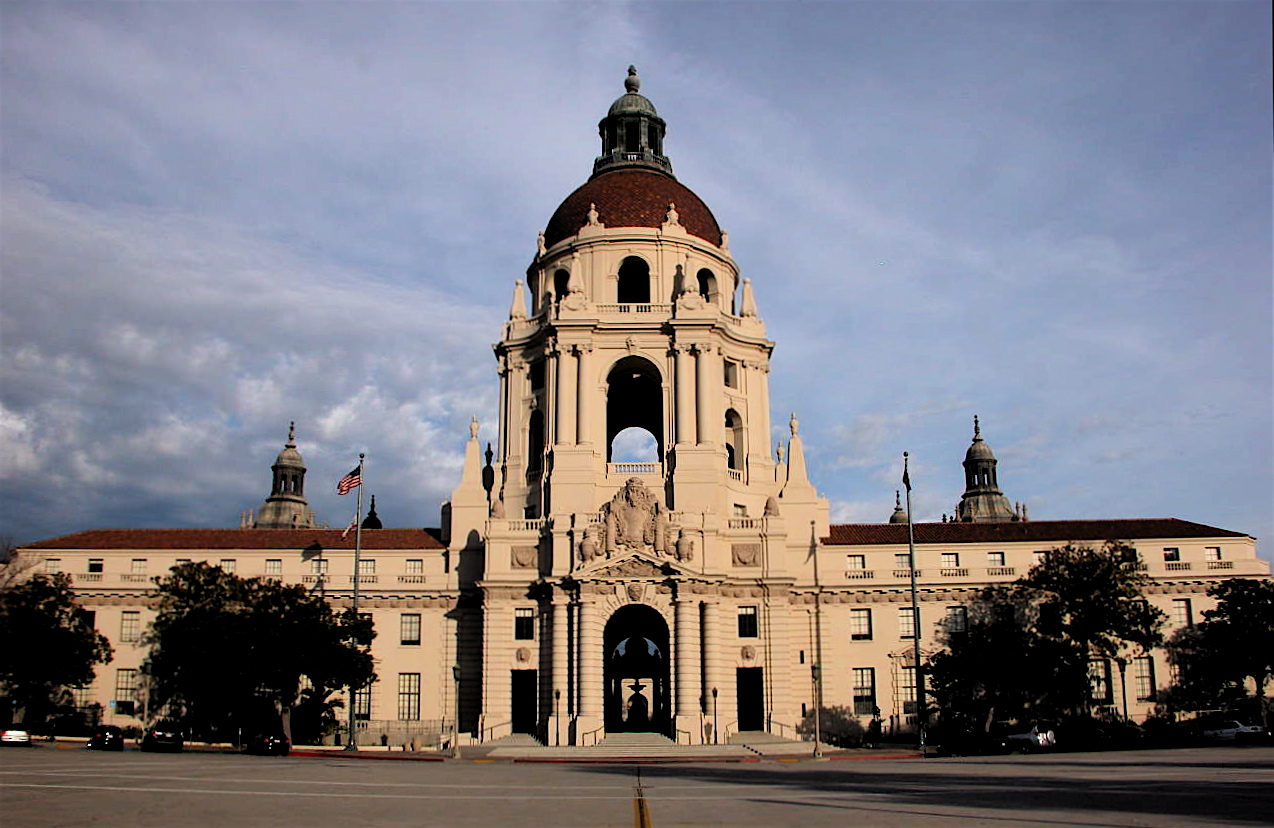
Pasadena City Hall

- Bakersfield City Hall
- Beverly Hills City Hall
- Burbank City Hall
- Chula Vista City Hall
- Fresno City Hall
- Hayward City Hall
- Los Angeles City Hall
- Nevada City City Hall
- Oakland City Hall
- Pasadena City Hall
- Sacramento City Hall
- San Francisco City Hall
- San José City Hall
- Santa Monica City Hall
- Thousand Oaks City Hall
- West Hollywood City Hall

== Colorado ==
- Denver City and County Building
- Ouray City Hall and Walsh Library

== Connecticut ==
- Knowlton Memorial Hall (Ashford)
- Branford Town Hall
- Bridgeport City Hall
- Deep River Town Hall
- Enfield Town Meetinghouse
- Greenwich Town Hall
- Hartford Municipal Building
- New Haven City Hall and County Courthouse
- Norwalk City Hall
- Old Town Hall (Stamford, Connecticut)
- Waterbury City Hall — part of Waterbury Municipal Center Complex
- Town Hall (Westport, Connecticut) (former; moved municipal offices in 1979)
- Windham Town Hall

== District of Columbia ==
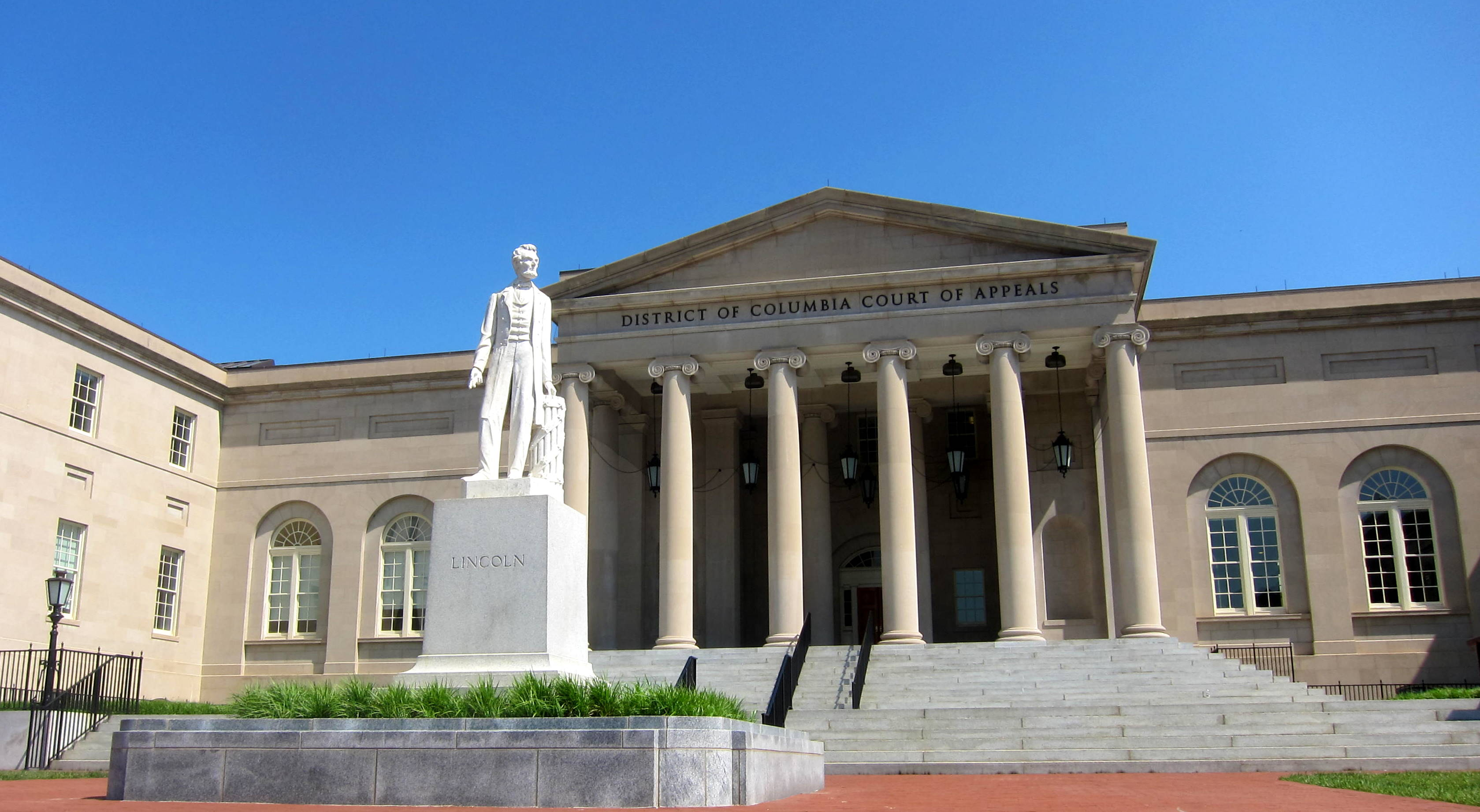
Washington DC's former city hall is an example of neoclassical architecture, which was in vogue when it was built

- John A. Wilson Building, current municipal building, also known as the District Building
- District of Columbia City Hall, former municipal building, now serves as a courthouse

== Florida ==
- Coral Gables City Hall
- Holly Hill City Hall
- Kelsey City City Hall
- Miami City Hall
- Orange City Town Hall
- Orlando City Hall
- Pensacola City Hall
- Tampa City Hall
- Jacksonville City Hall
- Windermere Town Hall

=== Former ===
- Belleair Town Hall
- Boca Raton Town Hall
- Chipley City Hall
- Crystal River City Hall
- Fort Pierce City Hall
- Homestead Town Hall
- Lake Wales City Hall
- Lake Worth City Hall Annex
- Live Oak City Hall
- Tarpon Springs City Hall

== Georgia ==
- Atlanta City Hall
- City Hall and Firehouse
- City Hall (Macon, Georgia)
- Griffin City Hall
- Jaeckel Hotel
- Ponce City Market (former)
- Savannah City Hall
- Statesboro City Hall and Fire Station
- Sumner High School and auditorium
- United States Post Office and Customs House (Atlanta) (former)

== Hawaii ==
- Honolulu Hale

== Illinois ==
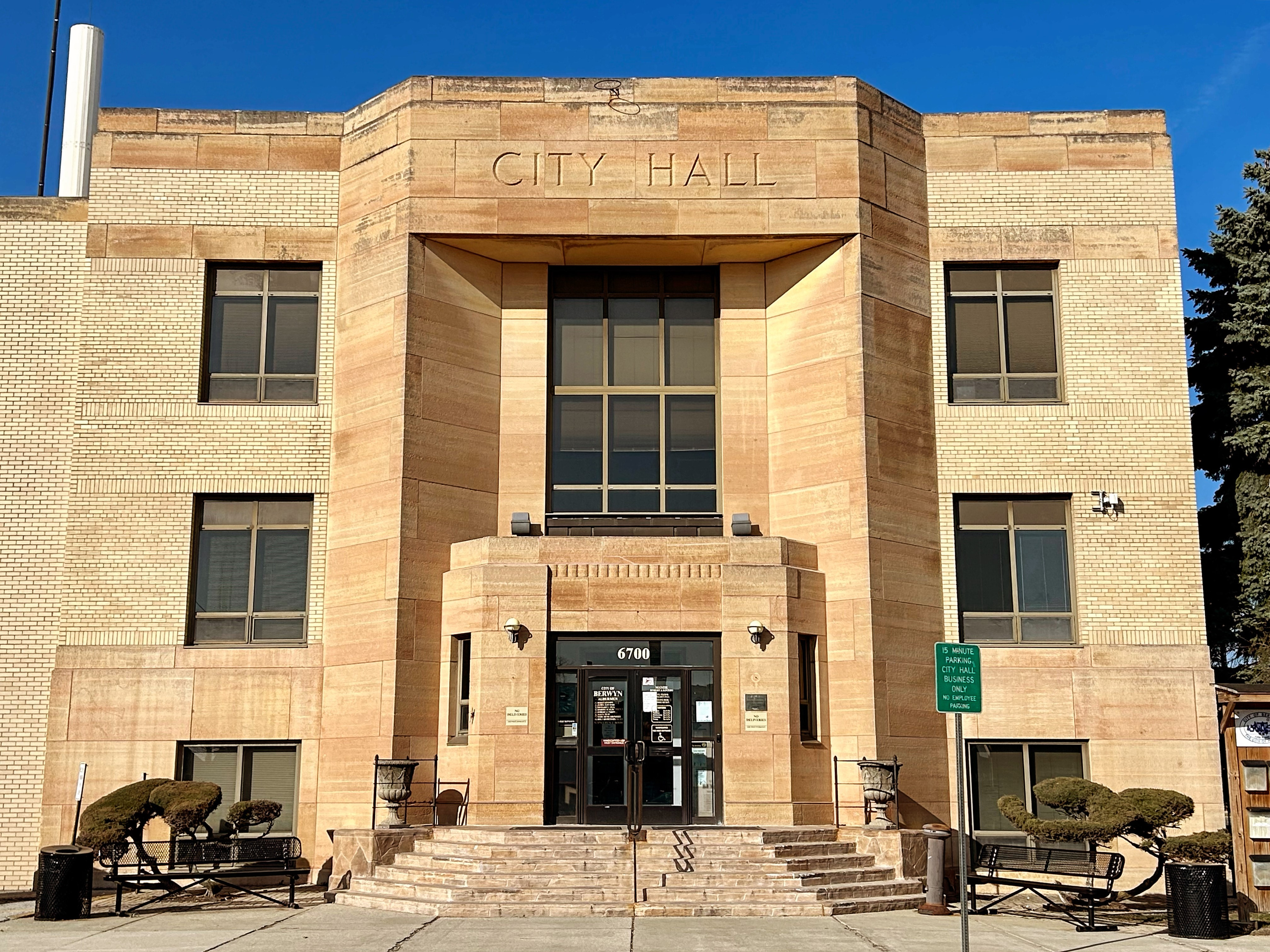
Because it was built by the PWA, the Berywn Illinois City Hall is done in the PWA Moderne style

- Berwyn Municipal Building
- Champaign City Building
- Chicago City Hall
- Charleston City Hall
- Fairbury City Hall
- Oregon City Hall
- Hillsboro Civic Center
- Peoria City Hall
- St. Charles Municipal Building

== Indiana ==
- City-County Building (Indianapolis)

=== Former ===
- Fort Wayne Old City Hall Building
- Old Indianapolis City Hall

== Iowa ==
- Davenport City Hall
- Des Moines City Hall
- Ottumwa City Hall

== Kentucky ==
- Louisville City Hall

== Maine ==
- Portland City Hall

== Maryland ==
- Baltimore City Hall
- College Park City Hall
- Cumberland City Hall

=== Former ===
- Cumberland, Maryland City Hall & Academy of Music

== Massachusetts ==
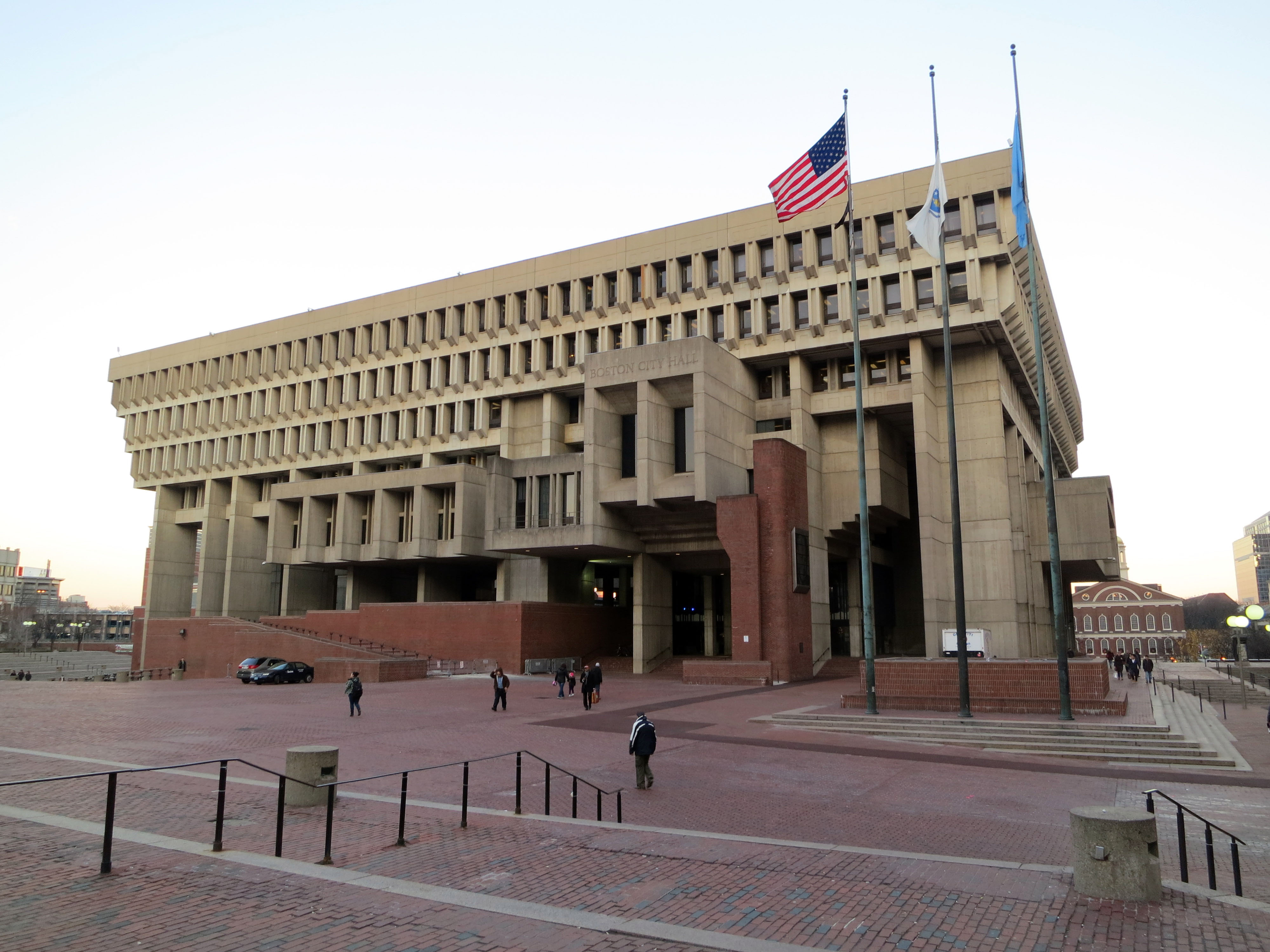
Boston City Hall is famous for its brutalist style

- Boston City Hall
- Worcester City Hall and Common

=== Former ===
- Boston City Hall

== Michigan ==
- Coleman A. Young Municipal Center
- Marquette City Hall

=== Former ===
- Detroit City Hall
- Old Grand Rapids City Hall

== Minnesota ==
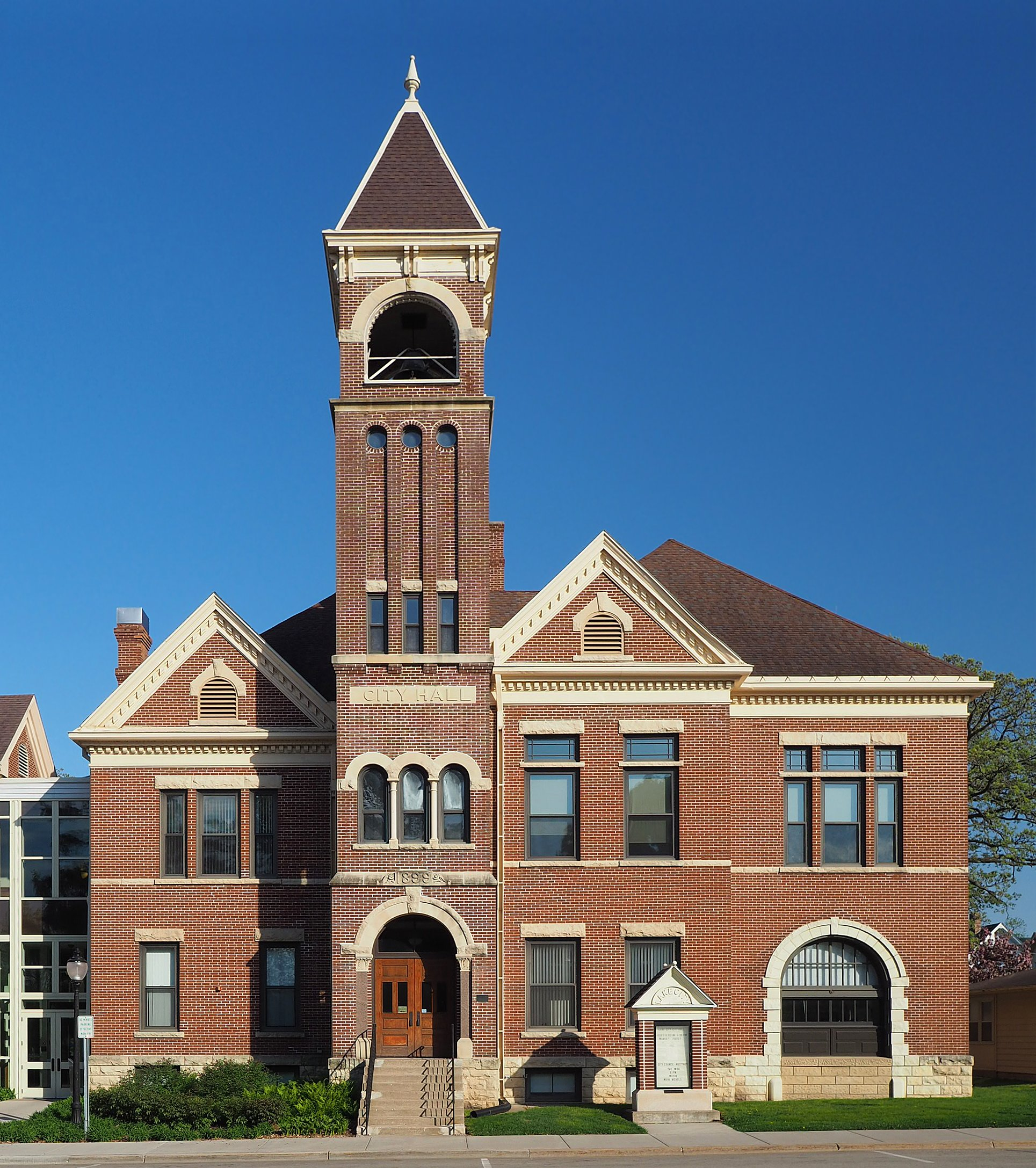
Lake City City Hall

- Bigfork Village Hall
- Buhl City Hall
- Cloquet City Hall
- Faribault City Hall
- Hastings City Hall
- Henderson Community Building
- Howard Lake City Hall
- Ironton City Hall
- Kimball City Hall
- Lake City City Hall
- Mahnomen City Hall
- Minneapolis City Hall
- Saint Paul City Hall and Ramsey County Courthouse
- Virginia City Hall
- Waverly Village Hall
- Winona City Hall

=== Former ===
- Ada Village Hall
- Appleton City Hall
- Delano Village Hall
- Gibbon Village Hall
- Grey Eagle Village Hall
- Kasson Municipal Building
- Milaca Municipal Hall
- Nerstrand City Hall
- Owatonna City and Firemen's Hall
- Wadena Fire and City Hall
- Young America City Hall

== Missouri ==
- Columbia City Hall
- Kansas City City Hall
- St. Louis City Hall
- University City City Hall

=== Former ===
- California City Hall
- St. Charles City Hall

== Nebraska ==
- Cedar Rapids City Hall and Library
- Hartington City Hall and Auditorium
- Omaha City Hall
- Schuyler City Hall

=== Former ===
- Omaha City Hall

== Nevada ==
- Las Vegas City Hall

== New Jersey ==
- Camden City Hall
- Edgewater Borough Hall
- Hoboken City Hall
- Metuchen Borough Hall
- Newark City Hall
- Ocean City City Hall
- Paterson City Hall
- Perth Amboy City Hall
- Trenton City Hall

== New York ==
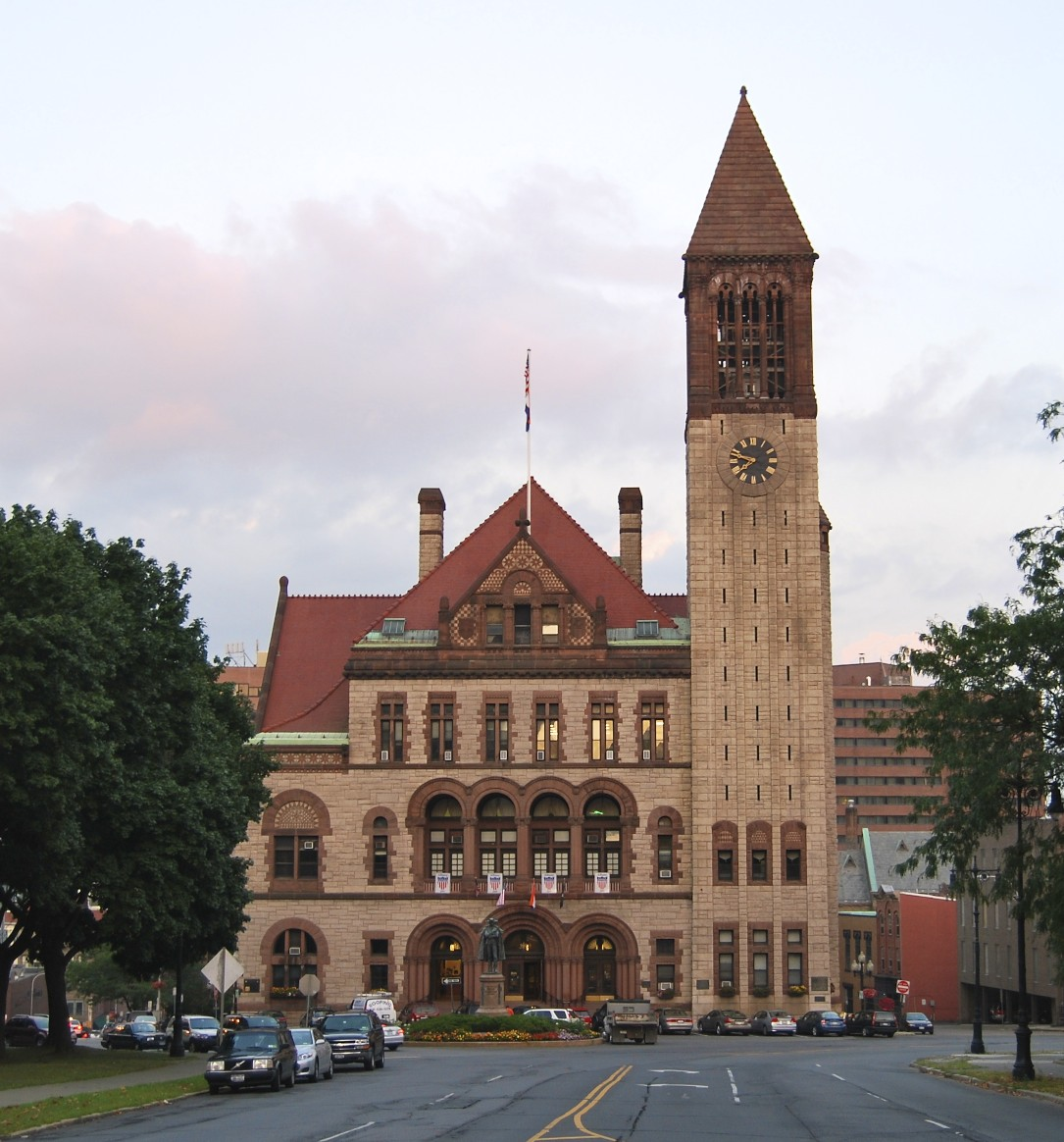
Albany City Hall was designed by the namesake of the Richardsonian Romanesque style

- Albany City Hall
- Buffalo City Hall
- Binghamton City Hall
- Cohoes City Hall
- Kingston City Hall
- New York City Hall
- Poughkeepsie City Hall
- Rochester City Hall
- Schenectady City Hall
- Syracuse City Hall
- Tonawanda Municipal Building

=== Former ===
- Brooklyn City Hall

== North Carolina ==
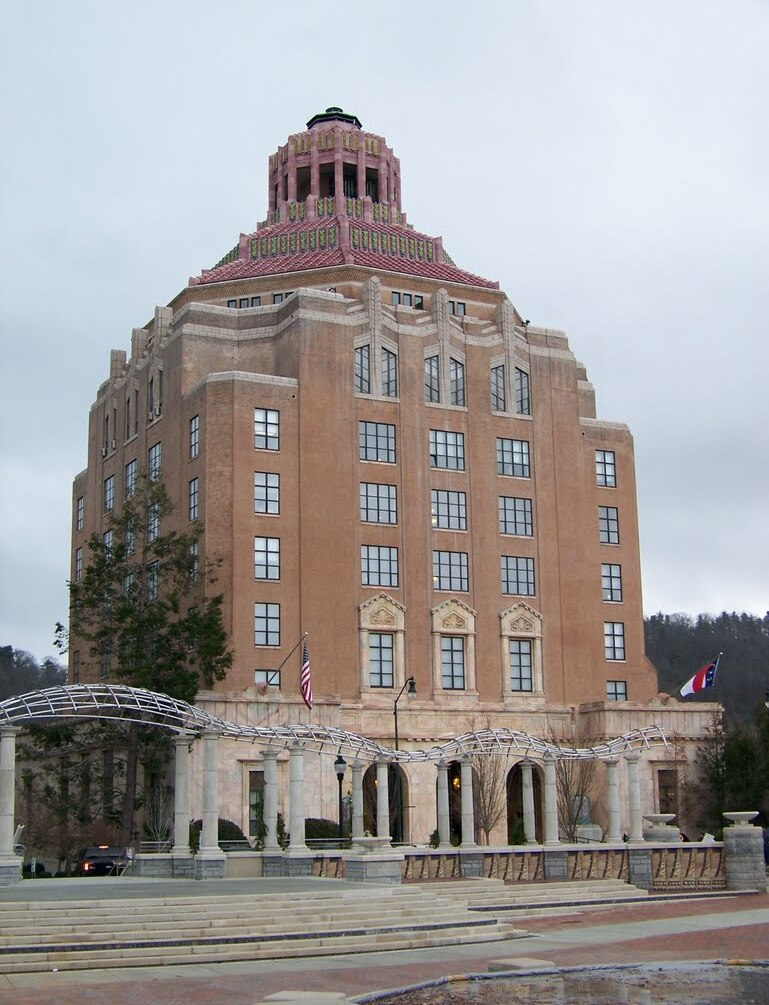
Ashville's City Hall demonstrates the art deco style.

- Asheville City Hall
- Winston-Salem City Hall

=== Former ===
- Kinston City Hall
- Wilmington City Hall

== Ohio ==
- Anna Town Hall
- Athens Governmental Buildings
- Cincinnati City Hall
- Cleveland City Hall
- College Hill Town Hall
- Columbus City Hall
- Franklin Township Hall

== Oregon ==
- Astoria City Hall
- Klamath Falls City Hall
- Portland City Hall
- Milwaukie City Hall

=== Former ===
- Astoria City Hall
- Eugene City Hall

== Rhode Island ==
- Pawtucket City Hall
- Providence City Hall
- Woonsocket City Hall

== Pennsylvania ==
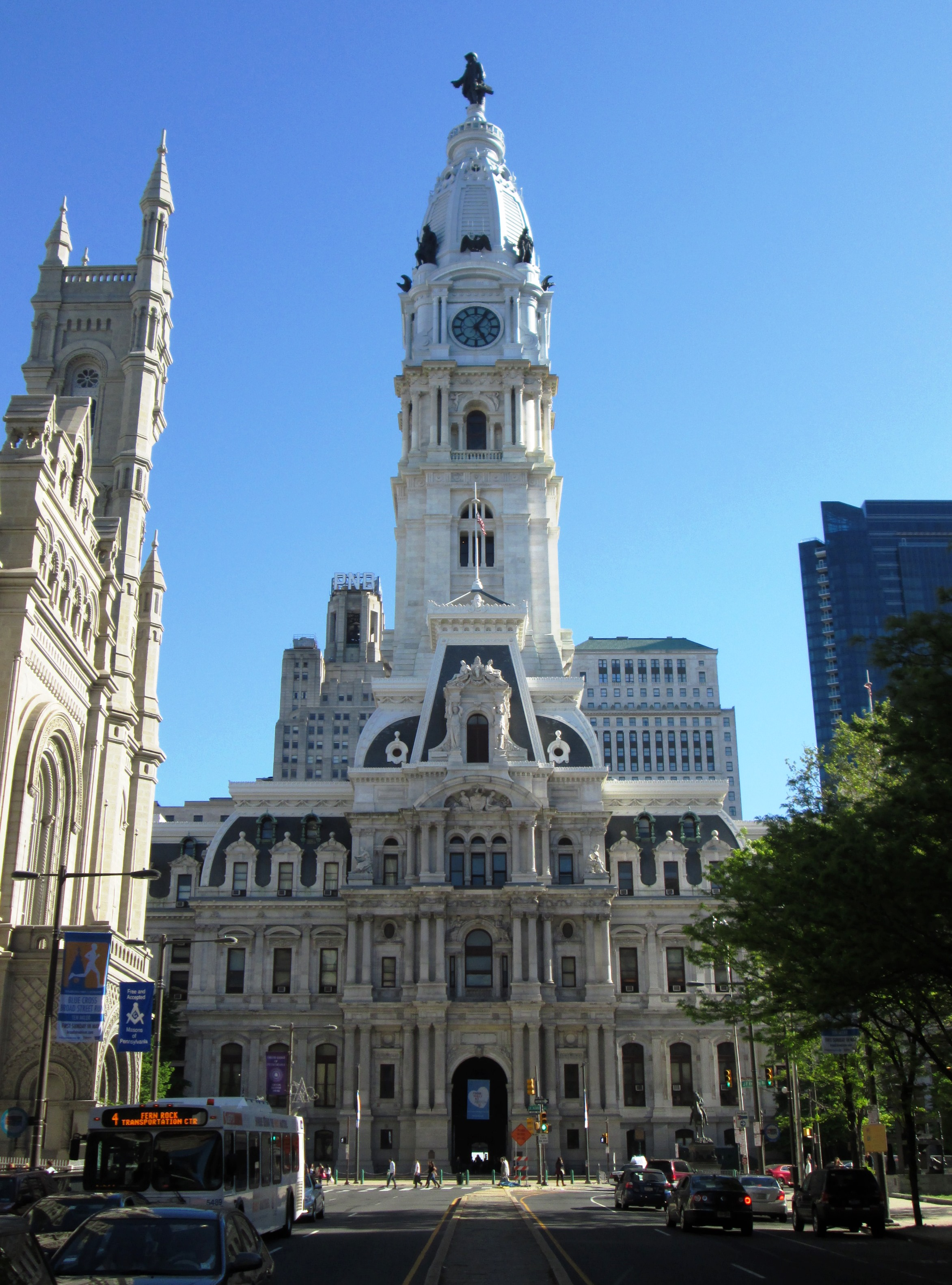
Philadelphia City Hall is associated with the Curse of Billy Penn.

- Bradford Old City Hall
- Scranton City Hall
- Philadelphia City Hall
- Pittsburgh City Hall

== Tennessee ==
- Coalmont City Hall

== Texas ==
- Dallas City Hall
- Houston City Hall
- Tyler City Hall

== Vermont ==
- Montpelier City Hall

== Virginia ==
- Alexandria City Hall

=== Former ===
- Norfolk City Hall
- Richmond City Hall

== West Virginia ==
- Charleston City Hall

== Wisconsin ==
- Milwaukee City Hall

== See also ==
- List of city and town halls
