= National Register of Historic Places listings in Bulloch County, Georgia =

Map of George with Bulloch County highlighted

This is a list of properties and districts in Bulloch County, Georgia that are listed on the National Register of Historic Places (NRHP).

This National Park Service list is complete through NPS recent listings posted March 21, 2025.

== Current listings ==
	Name on the Register	Image	Date listed	Location	City or town	Description
1	Sol Akins Farm		March 22, 1990 (#90000487)	Old Register Rd. off US 301, 1.2 mi. S of Statesboro; 32°24′21″N 81°48′11″W	Statesboro	On private property
2	James Alonzo Brannen House	James Alonzo Brannen House	September 6, 1989 (#89001154)	112 S. Main St./US 301; 32°26′46″N 81°47′00″W	Statesboro	
3	Bulloch County Courthouse	Bulloch County Courthouse	September 18, 1980 (#80000978)	Courthouse Sq. 32°26′57″N 81°46′59″W	Statesboro	
4	Donehoo-Brannen House	Donehoo-Brannen House	July 7, 1995 (#95000826)	332 Savannah Ave. 32°26′36″N 81°46′23″W	Statesboro	Also part of the Savannah Avenue Historic District
5	East Main Street Commercial Historic District	East Main Street Commercial Historic District	September 6, 1989 (#89001155)	Roughly E. Main St./US 301 between Siebald and Oak Sts. 32°26′56″N 81°46′56″W	Statesboro	
6	East Vine Street Warehouse and Depot District	East Vine Street Warehouse and Depot District	September 6, 1989 (#89001156)	Roughly bounded by E. Vine St., Central of Georgia Railroad tracks, and Cherry St. 32°26′51″N 81°46′52″W	Statesboro	Partially demolished in 2016
7	Dr. Madison Monroe Holland House	Dr. Madison Monroe Holland House	September 6, 1989 (#89001157)	27 S. Main St./US 301; 32°26′52″N 81°47′02″W	Statesboro	
8	Jaeckel Hotel	Jaeckel Hotel	June 17, 1982 (#82002389)	50 E. Main St. 32°26′55″N 81°46′54″W	Statesboro	Currently used as City Hall
9	John A. McDougald House	John A. McDougald House	June 21, 1982 (#82002390)	121 S. Main St. 32°26′44″N 81°47′03″W	Statesboro	Currently the Beaver House Restaurant
10	Dr. John C. Nevil House	Dr. John C. Nevil House	August 10, 1989 (#89001105)	US 301 S of Register; 32°17′08″N 81°52′37″W	Register	
11	Norris Hotel		October 19, 2023 (#100009454)	9 Hill St. 32°27′02″N 81°46′57″W	Statesboro	
12	North College Street Residential Historic District	North College Street Residential Historic District	September 6, 1989 (#89001158)	Roughly N. College St. from Northside Dr. to Elm St. 32°27′12″N 81°47′06″W	Statesboro	
13	North Main Street Commercial Historic District	North Main Street Commercial Historic District	September 6, 1989 (#89001159)	Roughly N. Main St. between Courtland and W. Main Sts. 32°26′57″N 81°47′00″W	Statesboro	
14	William W. Olliff Farm	William W. Olliff Farm	December 4, 1987 (#87002113)	New Hope Rd. 32°17′25″N 81°56′33″W	Register	
15	William G. Raines House	William G. Raines House	August 31, 1987 (#87000942)	106 S. Main St. 32°26′47″N 81°47′00″W	Statesboro	Currently known as "The Historic Statesboro Inn"
16	Savannah Avenue Historic District	Savannah Avenue Historic District	November 15, 1996 (#96001339)	Along Savannah Ave. and E. Grady St. between S. Crescent Cir. 32°26′38″N 81°46′24″W	Statesboro	
17	South Main Street Historic District	South Main Street Historic District	September 6, 1989 (#89001160)	Roughly S. Main St. between W. Main and Vine Sts. 32°26′55″N 81°47′00″W	Statesboro	
18	South Main Street Residential Historic District	South Main Street Residential Historic District	September 6, 1989 (#89001161)	Roughly College Ln., Southern Railway right-of-way, Walnut, Mikell, and S. Main Sts. 32°26′25″N 81°47′01″W	Statesboro	
19	Statesboro City Hall and Fire Station		September 6, 1989 (#89001162)	Siebald and Courtland Sts. 32°26′59″N 81°46′56″W	Statesboro	Demolished before 1997
20	Stewart Stores	Stewart Stores	May 20, 1993 (#93000430)	Jct. of Railroad St. (Mullet Row) and Grady St. 32°32′18″N 81°55′55″W	Portal	Only one of the stores is still there as of 2016. It is also known as the Portal Drugstore and is a Place in Peril.
21	Dr. James A. Stewart House	Dr. James A. Stewart House	May 27, 1993 (#93000439)	Grady St. 32°32′22″N 81°55′52″W	Portal	
22	Upper Lott's Creek Primitive Baptist Church and Cemetery	Upper Lott's Creek Primitive Baptist Church and Cemetery	December 4, 2008 (#08000967)	Metter-Portal Hwy. and Westside Rd. 32°29′17″N 81°58′23″W	Metter	
23	US Post Office-Statesboro	US Post Office-Statesboro	September 6, 1989 (#89001163)	26 S. Main St./US 301; 32°26′52″N 81°47′00″W	Statesboro	Was also used as City Hall. Currently houses offices of AgSouth Farm Credit
24	West Main Street Commercial Historic District	West Main Street Commercial Historic District	September 6, 1989 (#89001164)	Roughly W. Main St. between Walnut and N. and S. Main Sts. 32°26′56″N 81°47′03″W	Statesboro	
