= Buhl City Hall (Minnesota) =

Historic municipal building in Minnesota

- Buhl Village Hall
- U.S. National Register of Historic Places
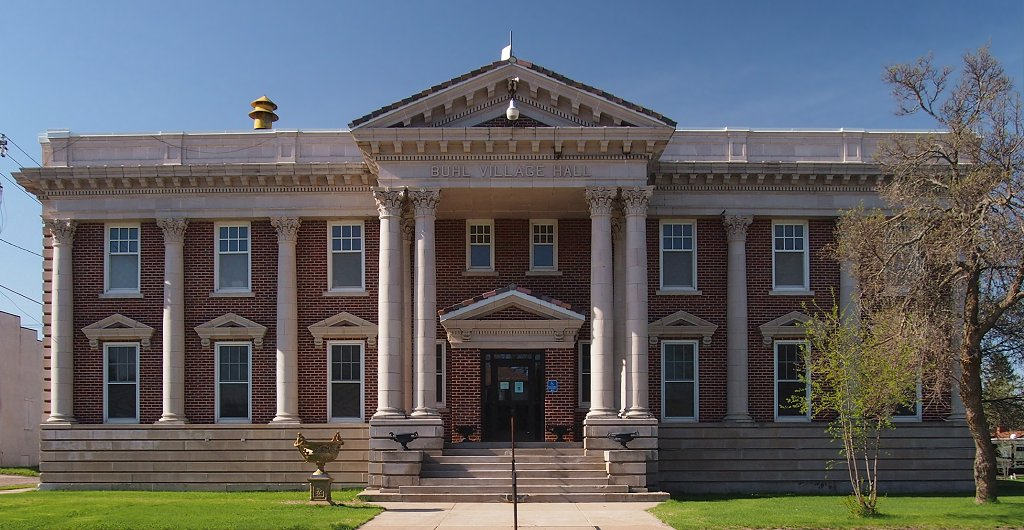
- Buhl City Hall viewed from the north-northeast

- Location within Minnesota Location within the United States
- Location: 300 Jones Avenue, Buhl, Minnesota
- Coordinates: 47°29′44″N 92°46′40″W
- Area: Less than one acre
- Built: 1913
- Built by: Bowe
- Architect: Keith Architectural Services
- Architectural style: Beaux-Arts
- NRHP reference No.: 83000944
- Added to NRHP: February 10, 1983

Buhl City Hall is the seat of municipal government for Buhl, Minnesota, United States. It was built in 1913 during the city's rapid expansion as a mining community on the Iron Range. It was listed as Buhl Village Hall on the National Register of Historic Places in 1983 for its local significance in the themes of architecture and politics/government. It was nominated for being a well preserved early-20th-century Beaux-Arts municipal hall and Buhl's long-serving government center.

== See also ==
- List of city and town halls in the United States
- National Register of Historic Places listings in St. Louis County, Minnesota
