= Gibbon, Minnesota =

City in Minnesota, United States

Gibbon
- City
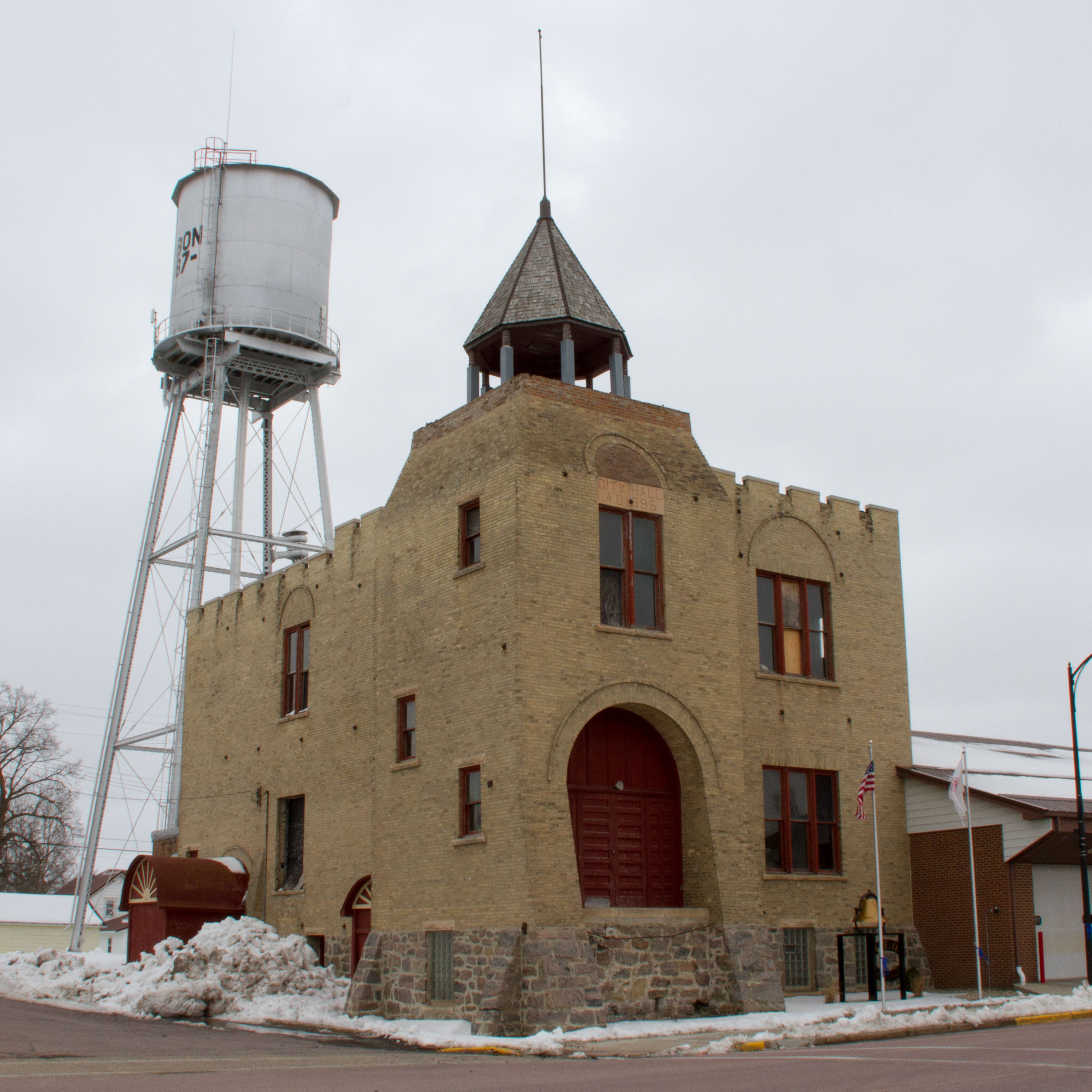
- Gibbon Village Hall, built in 1895, is listed on the National Register of Historic Places.

- Location of Gibbon within Sibley County, Minnesota
- Coordinates: 44°32′0″N 94°31′27″W
- Country: United States
- State: Minnesota
- County: Sibley
- Incorporated: 1887

Government
  - Type: Mayor – Council
  - Mayor: Steve Klukas

Area
  - Total: 0.66 sq mi (1.72 km^{2})
  - Land: 0.66 sq mi (1.72 km^{2})
  - Water: 0 sq mi (0.00 km^{2})
- Elevation: 1,050 ft (320 m)

Population (2020)
  - Total: 784
  - Density: 1,125.7/sq mi (434.63/km^{2})
- Time zone: UTC-6 (Central (CST))
  - Summer (DST): UTC-5 (CDT)
- ZIP code: 55335
- Area code: 507
- FIPS code: 27-23678
- GNIS feature ID: 0644116
- Website: www.cityofgibbon.com

"Gibbon Merchants Do Things", Postcard from around 1900

Gibbon is a city in Sibley County, Minnesota, United States. As of the 2020 census, Gibbon had a population of 784.

== History ==
Gibbon originated as a railway town that was first settled by German and Scandinavian immigrants around 1865. The town was incorporated in 1887 and named for General John Gibbon, a commandant at Fort Snelling from 1880 to 1882. By 1900, the town had grown to a population of 545.

== Geography ==
According to the United States Census Bureau, the city has a total area of 0.88 square miles (2.28 km^{2}), all of it land.

Gibbon is located along Minnesota State Highway 19 at its junction with Sibley County Road 2.

== Demographics ==
Historical population
Census	Pop.	Note	%±
1890	282		—
1900	545		93.3%
1910	533		−2.2%
1920	583		9.4%
1930	612		5.0%
1940	761		24.3%
1950	830		9.1%
1960	896		8.0%
1970	877		−2.1%
1980	787		−10.3%
1990	712		−9.5%
2000	808		13.5%
2010	772		−4.5%
2020	784		1.6%
U.S. Decennial Census

As of 2000 the median income for a household in the city was $37,321, and the median income for a family was $53,125. Males had a median income of $31,413 versus $30,694 for females. The per capita income for the city was $17,897. About 3.6% of families and 7.4% of the population were below the poverty line, including 10.7% of those under age 18 and 8.0% of those age 65 or over.

=== 2010 census ===
As of the census of 2010, there were 772 people, 353 households, and 210 families residing in the city. The population density was 877.3 inhabitants per square mile (338.7/km^{2}). There were 394 housing units at an average density of 447.7 per square mile (172.9/km^{2}). The racial makeup of the city was 95.5% White, 1.3% African American, 0.3% Asian, 2.3% from other races, and 0.6% from two or more races. Hispanic or Latino of any race were 3.4% of the population.

There were 353 households of which 26.1% had children under the age of 18 living with them, 47.6% were married couples living together, 8.5% had a female householder with no husband present, 3.4% had a male householder with no wife present, and 40.5% were non-families. 37.4% of all households were made up of individuals and 20.4% had someone living alone who was 65 years of age or older. The average household size was 2.19 and the average family size was 2.85.

The median age in the city was 44.6 years. 22.8% of residents were under the age of 18; 5.4% were between the ages of 18 and 24; 22.1% were from 25 to 44; 25.7% were from 45 to 64; and 23.8% were 65 years of age or older. The gender makeup of the city was 48.6% male and 51.4% female.

== Notable people ==
- Doloris Bridges, New Hampshire politician

== Education ==
Gibbon is the district office and elementary school home of GFW ISD #2365. It also hosts Prairie Lutheran School, and the Starland School.

== Sports ==
Gibbon has a Tomahawk East League baseball team, the Gibbon Reds.
