= Gibbon Village Hall =

Government building in Minnesota, United States

- U.S. National Register of Historic Places
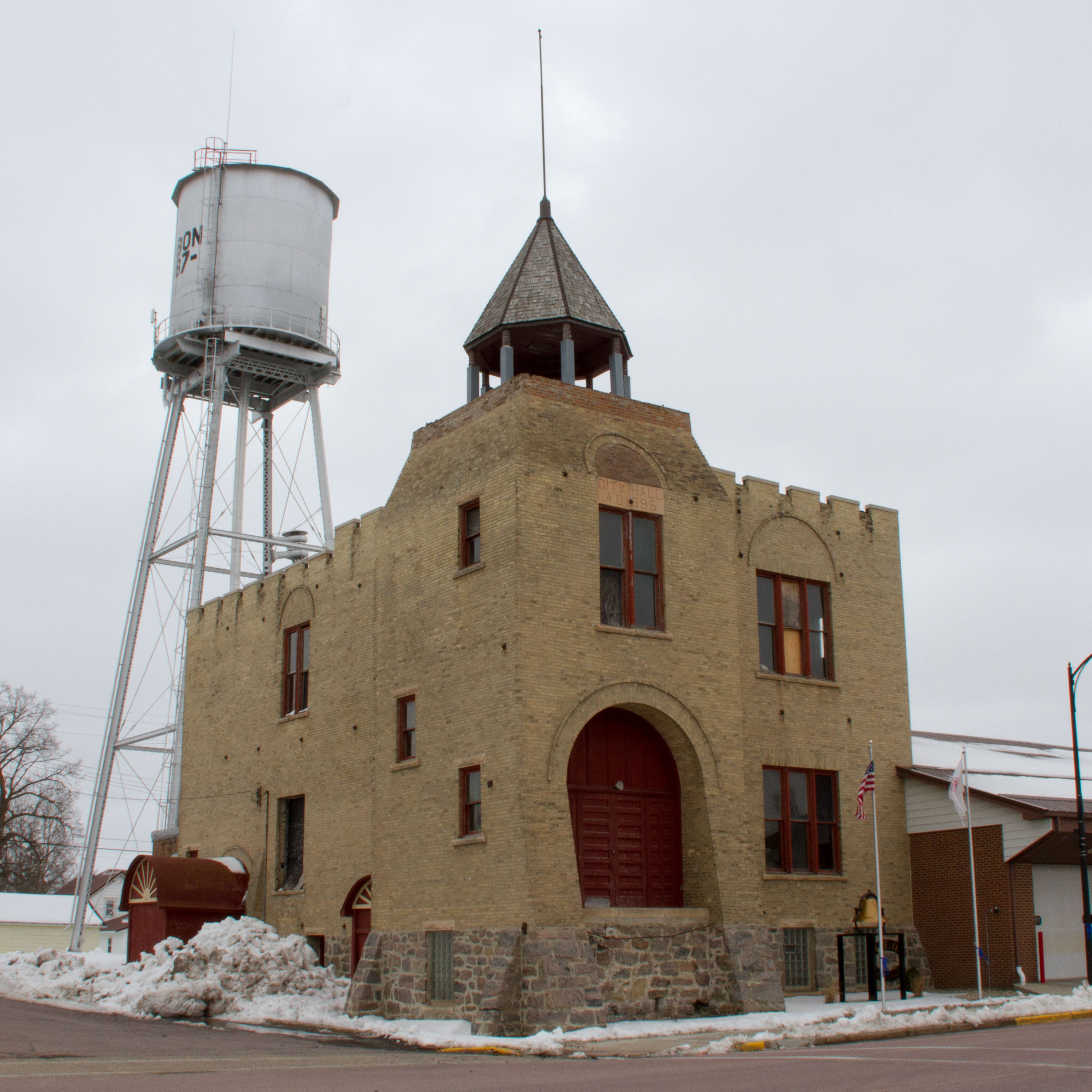
- Gibbon Village Hall viewed from the northwest

- Location within Minnesota Location within the United States
- Location: 1173 1st Avenue, Gibbon, Minnesota
- Coordinates: 44°32′4″N 94°31′35″W
- Area: Less than one acre
- Built: 1895
- Architect: Charles Webster
- Architectural style: Romanesque Revival
- NRHP reference No.: 82003036
- Added to NRHP: August 19, 1982

Gibbon Village Hall is a former municipal hall in Gibbon, Minnesota, United States. It was built in 1895 with medieval-themed Romanesque Revival architecture. It was listed on the National Register of Historic Places in 1982 for its local significance in the theme of architecture. Gibbon Village Hall was nominated for being a well-preserved example of an unusual variation on Romanesque Revival style.

Gibbon's government services relocated to other buildings in the 1970s.

== Description ==
Gibbon Village Hall is a two-story brick building on a corner lot. It stands on a raised basement of Morton Gneiss with angled buttresses. The roofline is mostly crenellated, though the prominent corner tower has a battered top. Surmounting this is an open belfry with an octagonal roof. The original entrance was on the west side of the tower under a large, semicircular arch, accessed by steep stairs which have since been removed. A semicircular arched canopy and entryway at the north rear provide access to the basement.

== History ==
Gibbon Village Hall was built in 1895 at a cost of $7,500 (equivalent to $290,250 in 2025) and dedicated on November 29 of that year. It originally housed Gibbon's government offices, fire station, jail, and civic auditorium. The fire station and jail were in the basement, the auditorium occupied the first floor, and the second floor comprised offices and meeting rooms.

The hall served Gibbon as seat of government and community center until the mid-1970s. At that time Gibbon's fire services moved to a new facility directly adjacent to the old hall, and the government offices moved to a former bank building two blocks away.

== See also ==
- List of city and town halls in the United States
- National Register of Historic Places listings in Sibley County, Minnesota
