= James Alonzo Brannen House =

Historic house in Georgia, United States

- U.S. National Register of Historic Places
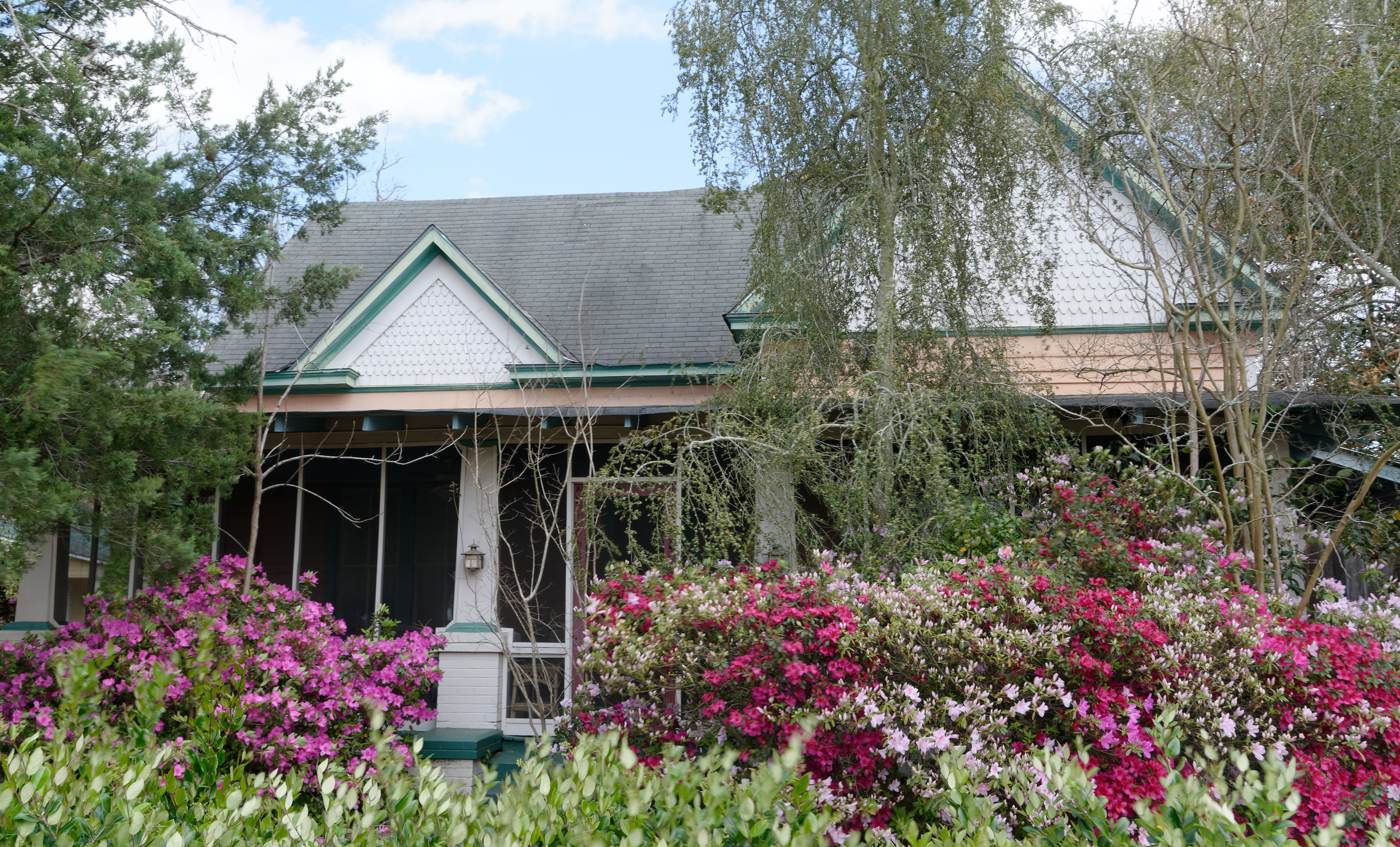
- The house in 2017

- Location within Georgia Location within the United States
- Location: 112 S. Main St./US 301
- Coordinates: 32.44625°N 81.78335°W
- Area: less than one acre
- Built: 1881
- MPS: Downtown Statesboro MPS
- NRHP reference No.: 89001154
- Added to NRHP: September 6, 1989

The James Alonzo Brannen House is a house built in 1881 in Statesboro, Georgia. It is notable as the oldest residence in the town and for its association with lawyer J. A. Brannen (1858-1923), for whom it was built, and who served as the town's first mayor.

The house is a single-story frame house with an L-shaped plan. Its porch, with four columns on brick piers, was added c.1917.

Brannen founded the Statesboro Eagle and Statesboro News newspapers, and he owned and developed property that is now in the West Main Street Commercial Historic District.

It has some elements of Late Victorian / Queen Anne style, such as its fish-scale shingles on the end and front gables. It was listed on the National Register of Historic Places (NRHP) in 1989.

Statesboro was the subject of a wider survey of historic resources completed at the same time as the NRHP nomination for the district.
