= Winona City Hall =

- U.S. National Register of Historic Places
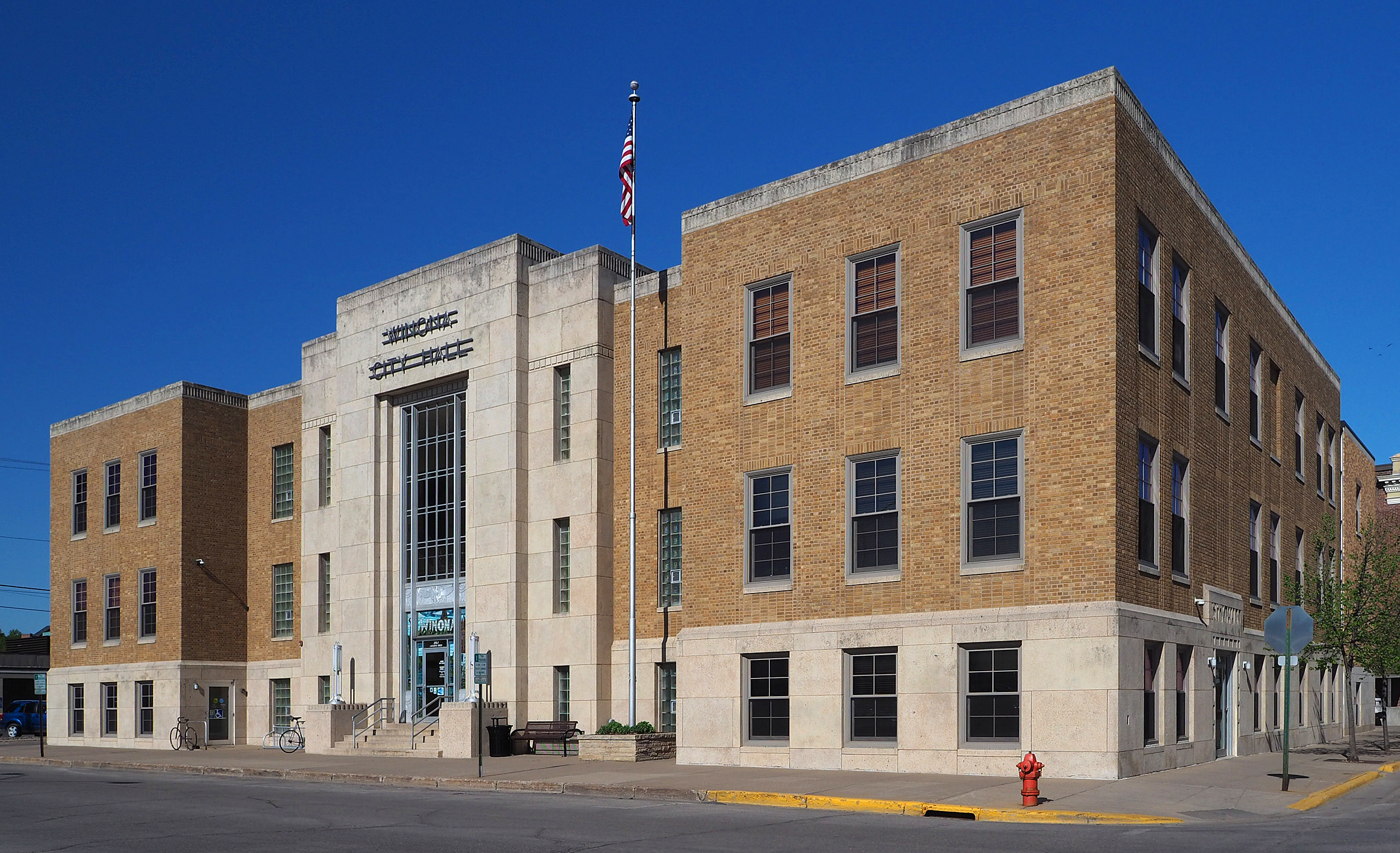
- Winona City Hall viewed from the east

- Location within Minnesota Location within the United States
- Location: 207 Lafayette Street, Winona, Minnesota
- Coordinates: 44°3′3″N 91°38′10″W
- Area: Less than one acre
- Built: 1939
- Built by: Standard Construction Co.
- Architect: Boyum, Schubert & Sorenson
- Architectural style: PWA Moderne
- MPS: Federal Relief Construction in Minnesota MPS
- NRHP reference No.: 99000806
- Designated: July 8, 1999

Winona City Hall is the seat of municipal government for Winona, Minnesota, United States. It was built with federal funding from the Public Works Administration in 1939.

The building was listed on the National Register of Historic Places in 1999 for having local significance in the themes of architecture and politics/government. It was nominated as a local example of the massive federal relief efforts of the New Deal and for its exceptional Classical Moderne architecture.

The building was designed by the local firm of Boyum, Schubert and Sorensen in 1938. It is partially faced in local travertine stone. Winona City Hall originally included a police station with police garage and jail cells, which were removed when the interior of the building was remodeled in the early 1980s.

== See also ==
- List of city and town halls in the United States
- National Register of Historic Places listings in Winona County, Minnesota
