= Ironton City Hall =

- U.S. National Register of Historic Places
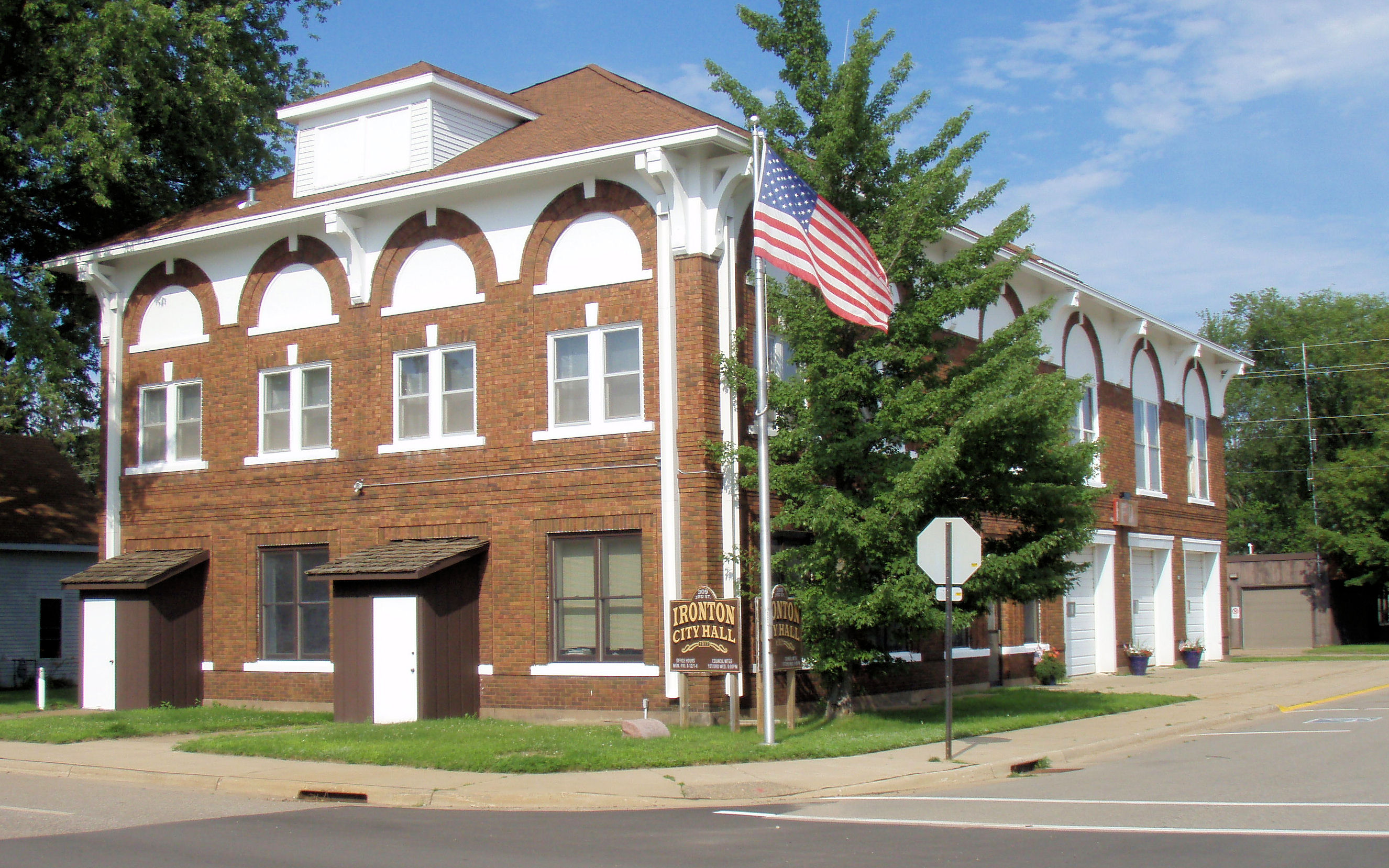
- Ironton City Hall from the southwest

- Location within Minnesota Location within the United States
- Location: 309 3rd Street, Ironton, Minnesota
- Coordinates: 46°28′43.5″N 93°58′37.5″W
- Built: 1917
- Architect: Alex Nelson
- Architectural style: American Craftsman, Colonial Revival
- NRHP reference No.: 02000637
- Designated: June 14, 2002

Ironton City Hall is a historic municipal building in Ironton, Minnesota, United States. It was built in 1917 to house the city's offices, fire department, library, jail, and an auditorium that hosted numerous community organizations and events. Ironton City Hall was listed on the National Register of Historic Places in 2002 for having local significance in the themes of politics/government and social history. It was nominated for being the longstanding focal point of Ironton's government services and community activities.

== Description ==
Ironton City Hall is a two-story rectangular building measuring about 94 by 46 feet (29 by 14 m). The principal façades are to the west and south. A one-story, 36-by-16-foot (11.0 by 4.9 m) extension at the northeast corner originally housed the jail. Centered on the east façade is a two-and-a-half-story tower used to dry the fire department's hoses.

The building rests on a limestone foundation with a partial basement. The walls are polychrome brick in shades of red, brown, black, and orange. The hip roof has wide eaves supported by projecting wooden brackets. A hip-roofed dormer is centered on the western façade.

The west and south façades have the most decorative elements. Decorative brickwork frames the ground-floor windows and doors, and two belt courses of corbeled bricks accentuate the division between the upper and lower floors. Bricks above the second-floor windows are set to form flat relief arches. Each is surmounted by a semicircular transom window set into a brick arch. However these fanlights were covered over with plywood around 1980. The negative space defined by the arches is stucco rather than brick. All three rows of windows have wide limestone window sills, and the upper two rows are punctuated with white keystones. The prominent downspouts at the corners were added in a 1996 remodeling.

There are three primary doorways, one on the south and two on the west. The latter two were enclosed in shed-like additions around 1980. Three garage doors on the south façade provide access for firefighting equipment.

The second-floor interior originally consisted of a large auditorium with a balcony, plus a kitchen and two small reading rooms.

== Origin ==
The city of Ironton was platted in 1910 as iron mining of the Cuyuna Range fueled a local economic boom. Inspired by the City Beautiful movement, co-founder John H. Hill envisioned a town with wide streets, public parks, and fashionable amenities to attract cultured residents and families to what would otherwise have been a rough mining town. His suggestion for a centrally located, multipurpose city hall was not approved by the city council, however, until 1916. A public vote that November overwhelmingly supported construction of such a hall and the issuance of a $20,000 municipal bond to finance the project.

By then the boomtown had no suitable empty lots, so the city cleared one by paying nominal fees to the owners of three houses and covering the cost of relocating the structures elsewhere. The selected site was adjacent to Ironton's main business district and across the street from the railroad depot. Four bids for construction of the hall were received in June 1917 and the contract went to Alex Nelson of Perham, Minnesota. Construction began the next week and the building was dedicated in December of that year.

== Use ==
Upon opening, Ironton City Hall included space for city council meetings, the fire department, and the jail. The city's public library was officially established in 1920 and immediately moved into the hall as well.

The fire department's space included an equipment room with three garage doors, and a club room with lockers, showers, and recreational furnishings. The department received its first motorized fire engine shortly after completion of the hall. Its staff also performed the maintenance activities for the building and used the basement as a gymnasium. In 1920 an alarm bell at the top of the hose tower was replaced with an electric siren and the garage doors were modified because they were too short to accommodate some new firefighting equipment.

Law enforcement remained an issue in the mining town, and one or two marshals worked out of the hall. The jail wing included four cells. This allowed Ironton to stop contracting with the adjacent city of Crosby to house its prisoners, and in fact it began housing prisoners for nearby Deerwood.

The second-floor auditorium could seat up to 400 people and was available for rent by community groups. Booking fees were discounted for organizations raising money for charity. Many of the first events held in the hall were benefits for American soldiers serving in World War I or their dependents at home. A wide variety of organizations booked the auditorium, including fraternal societies, ethnic clubs, sports teams, scout groups, and the local high school. Events ranged from "dramatic readings" to dances, concerts, craft bazaars, and at least one indoor carnival. The room was also pressed into service as a hospital during the 1918 flu pandemic.

== Later history ==
The need for police services in Ironton waned with the demise of the mining industry. The Ironton police department was disbanded in 1971 and law enforcement services were contracted to a neighboring city once again. The city hall's upper floor and basement were closed off in 1993 due to accessibility issues. Accessible restrooms were installed on the ground floor in 1996, part of a renovation that also reconfigured the division between the government offices and the library. At the time of the property's National Register nomination in 2002, the building still housed the city council chambers, county clerk's office, children's library, and fire department.

== See also ==
- List of city and town halls in the United States
- National Register of Historic Places listings in Crow Wing County, Minnesota
