= Upper Lott's Creek Primitive Baptist Church and Cemetery =

United States historic place in Metter, Georgia

- Upper Lotts Creek Primitive Baptist Church and Cemetery
- U.S. National Register of Historic Places
- U.S. Historic district
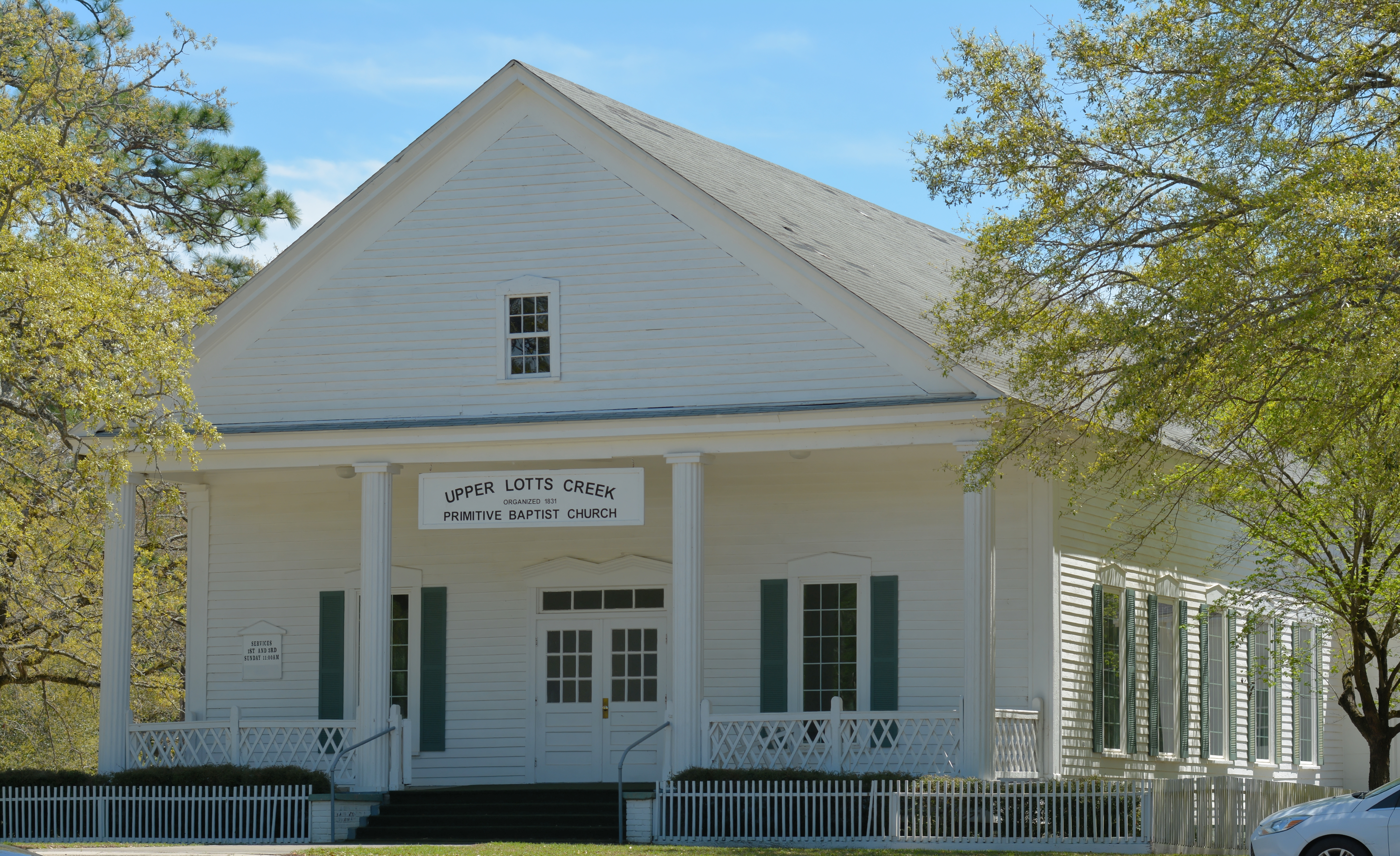

- Location within Georgia
- Nearest city: Metter, Georgia
- Area: 15 acres (6.1 ha)
- Built: 1881
- Architectural style: Greek Revival
- NRHP reference No.: 08000967
- Added to NRHP: December 4, 2008

The Upper Lott's Creek Primitive Baptist Church and Cemetery is a historic site in Upper Lotts Creek or Upper Lott's Creek in Metter, Georgia. It was added to the National Register of Historic Places on December 4, 2008. It is located on the Metter-Portal Highway and Westside Road.

The one-room, one-story church, built in 1881, has elements of Greek Revival style. An annex was added to the rear, in 1959.

As of 2008 the cemetery had 328 marked graves, dating back to 1902, but also had unmarked plots that may go back as far as 1841.

== See also ==
- National Register of Historic Places listings in Bulloch County, Georgia
