= Wadena Fire and City Hall =

- U.S. National Register of Historic Places
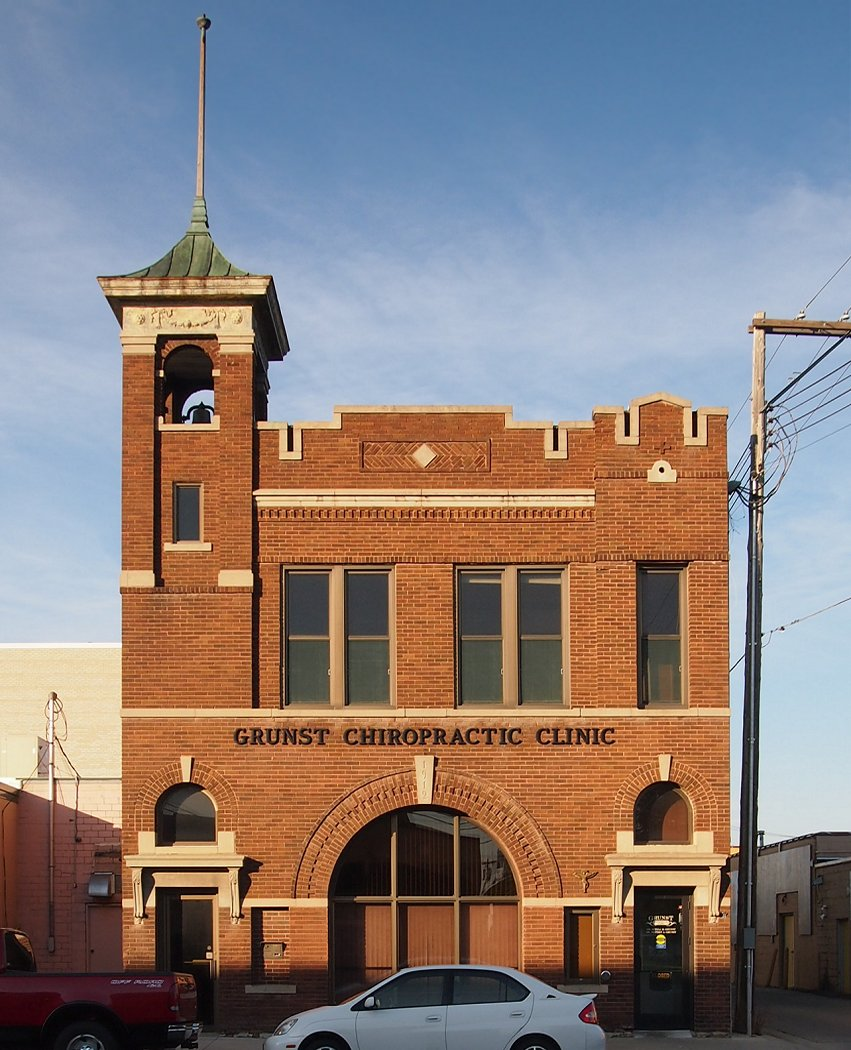
- Wadena Fire and City Hall from the southwest

- Location within Minnesota Location within the United States
- Interactive map showing the location of Wadena Fire and City Hall
- Location: 10 Southeast Bryant Avenue, Wadena, Minnesota
- Coordinates: 46°26′24.5″N 95°8′12.5″W
- Area: Less than one acre
- Built: 1912–13
- Built by: Harrison Bros.
- Architect: Kirby T. Snyder
- Architectural style: Renaissance Revival
- NRHP reference No.: 88003228
- Designated: January 19, 1989

The former Wadena Fire and City Hall is a historic government building in Wadena, Minnesota, United States, built in 1912. It was listed on the National Register of Historic Places in 1989 for having local significance in the theme of politics/government. It was nominated for being a representative example of early-20th-century civic development and of the municipal buildings common to many small Minnesotan cities. The building now houses a chiropractic clinic.

== Description ==
The old Wadena Fire and City Hall is a rectangular, two-story building of red brick with concrete details. The center of the ground floor façade is dominated by a large, semicircular arch with a raised concrete keystone. This is flanked by symmetrical doors with corbeled concrete lintels topped by smaller arched windows. The second floor is topped by a dentillated false cornice, a decorative panel of bricks in a herringbone pattern, and a crenelated parapet. Many of these decorations derive from Renaissance Revival architecture. The southwest corner of the building has an open belfry with a pyramidal roof and a concrete frieze embellished with festoons.

== History ==
Wadena's first combination city hall and fire station was built in 1885. Within a quarter of a century the facility was inadequate for both purposes, and city officials began planning a replacement in late 1911. Minneapolis architect Kirby T. Snyder drafted a compact design for a new multipurpose hall. Construction began on a new lot the following summer and was completed in early January 1913. The period of 1910 to 1915 saw a major construction boom in Wadena, with new public, commercial, and residential buildings appearing, plus two large new churches.

== See also ==
- List of city and town halls in the United States
- List of fire stations
- National Register of Historic Places listings in Wadena County, Minnesota
