= Lake City City Hall =

- U.S. National Register of Historic Places
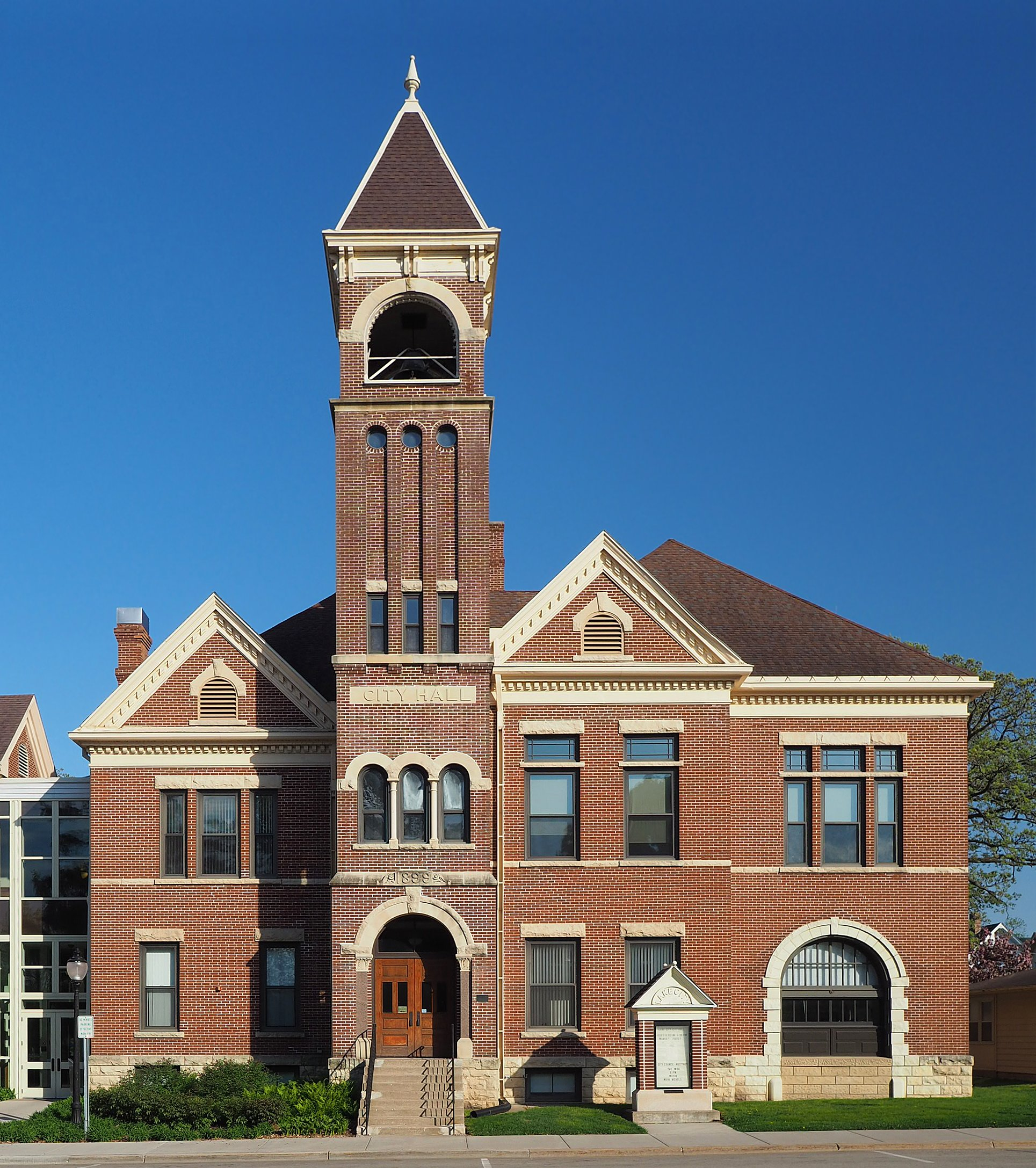
- The historic section of Lake City City Hall viewed from the northwest

- Location within Minnesota Location within the United States
- Interactive map showing the location of Lake City City Hall
- Location: 205 W. Center Street, Lake City, Minnesota
- Coordinates: 44°26′51.5″N 92°16′0″W
- Area: Less than one acre
- Built: 1899
- Built by: Robert White
- Architect: E. Alexander
- Architectural style: Queen Anne/Romanesque Revival
- NRHP reference No.: 81000325
- Designated: June 16, 1981

Lake City City Hall is the seat of government for Lake City, Minnesota, United States. It was built in 1899 and later expanded with a large addition. The original section was listed on the National Register of Historic Places in 1981 for its local significance in the themes of architecture and politics/government. It was nominated for being Lake City's most architecturally prominent public building and its longstanding government center.

== Description ==
The original section of Lake City City Hall is a two-story brick building with a four-story bell tower. It stands on a limestone foundation, a material also used for the water table, window lintels, and archways. It exhibits an eclectic mix of Queen Anne and Romanesque Revival architecture. Queen Anne elements include the asymmetrical massing, flat brick façade, windows grouped in twos and threes with transom lights, fluted chimneys, and detailing with brackets, dentils, and finials. The Romanesque elements include the semicircular arches, rusticated foundation, coping and corbelling of the gables, and the open bell tower with circular arched windows and pyramidal roof.

== History ==
Upon its completion in 1899, Lake City City Hall housed city offices, the public library, and the fire department on the ground floor. The second floor contained a large event space, referred to over the years as an opera house, an auditorium, or a ballroom. This area now houses the Lake City Historical Society Museum.

== See also ==
- List of city and town halls in the United States
- National Register of Historic Places listings in Wabasha County, Minnesota
