= Donehoo-Brannen House =

Historic house in Georgia, United States

- U.S. National Register of Historic Places
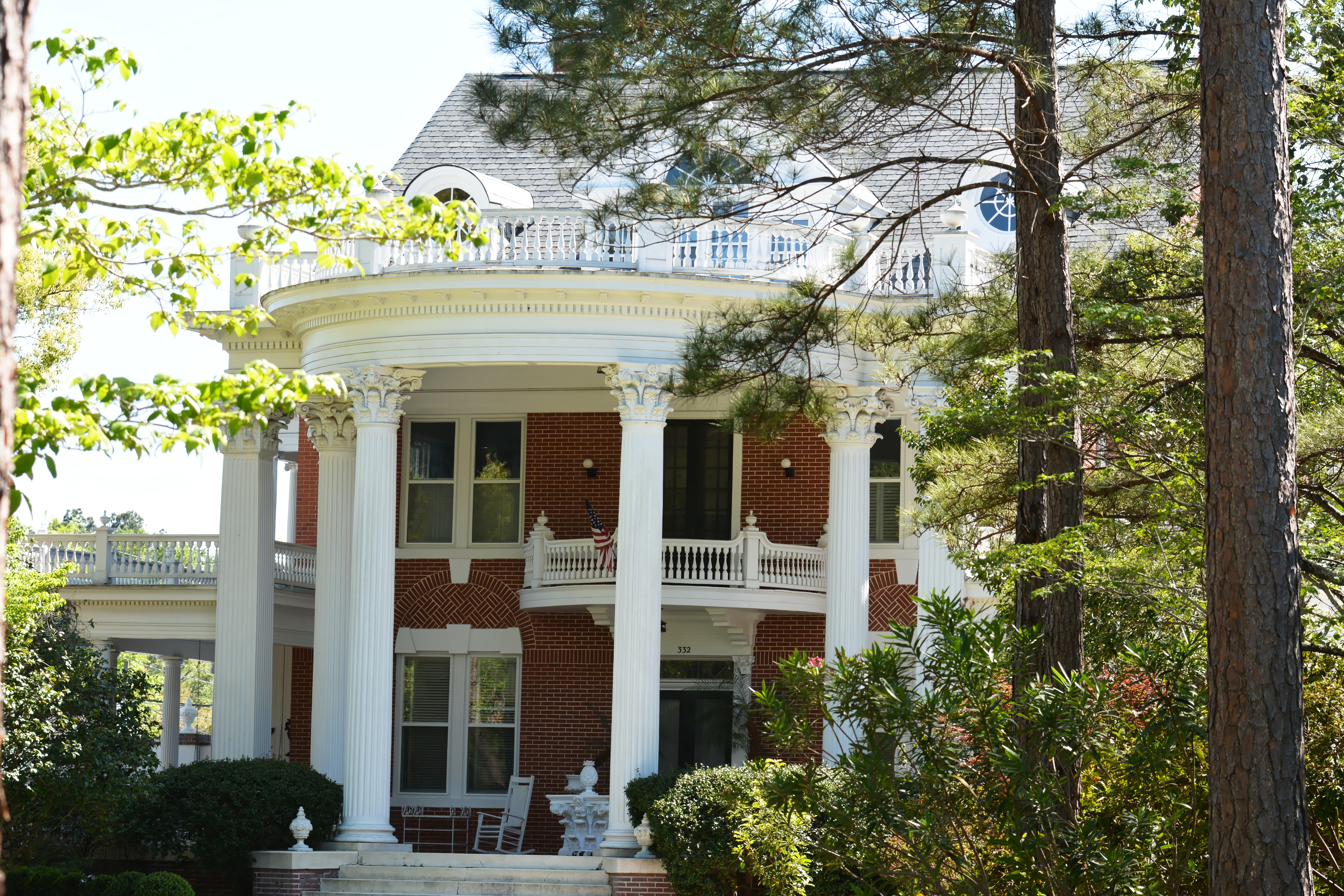
- Donehoo-Brannen House (2017)

- Location within Georgia Location within the United States
- Location: 332 Savannah Avenue, Statesboro, Georgia
- Coordinates: 32.44324°N 81.77292°W
- Built: 1917; 109 years ago
- Architects: Edward Columbus Hosford of Edward C. Hosford, & Co.; J. B.Sargent, builder
- Architectural style: Classical Revival
- NRHP reference No.: 95000826
- Added to NRHP: July 7, 1995

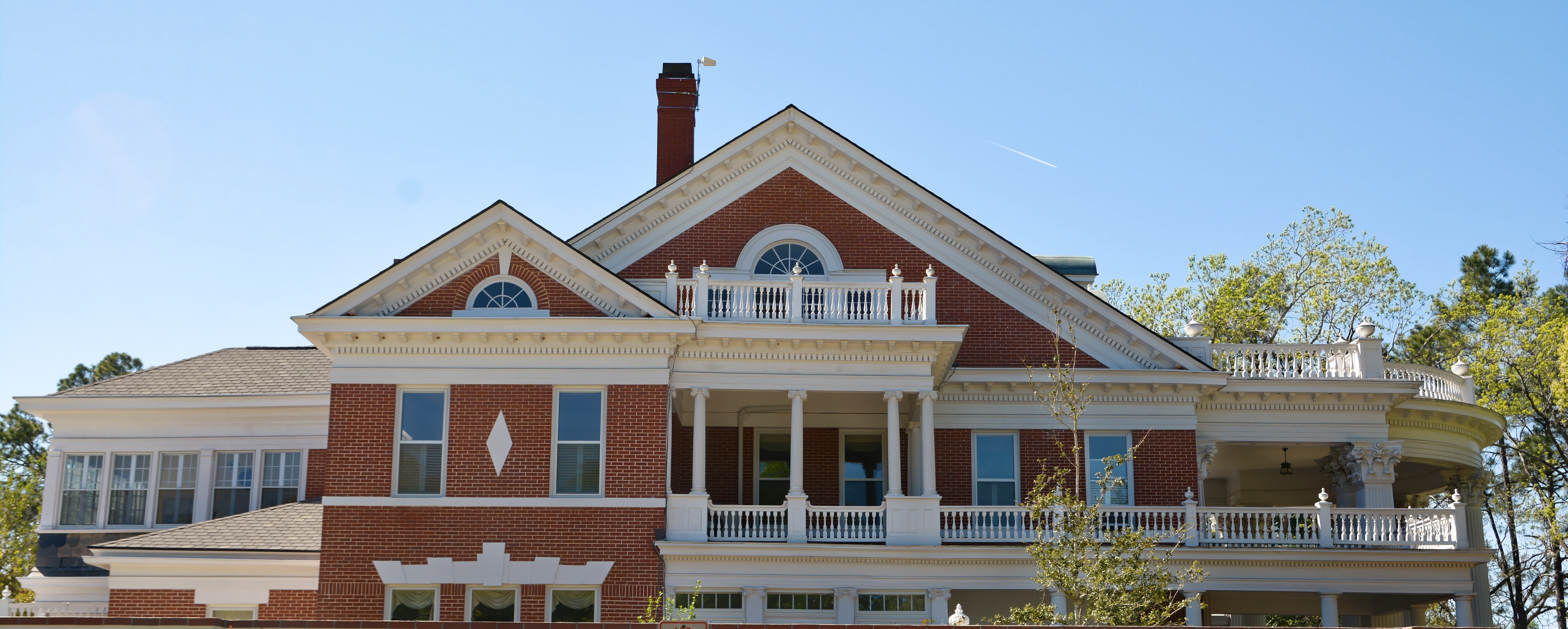
top and side of the house

The Donehoo-Brannen House (also known as the Donehoo-Brannen-Nesmith House) is a historic house located at 332 Savannah Avenue in Statesboro, Georgia.

== Description and history ==
The Classical Revival style house was completed in 1917 and was designed by the Georgia-born American architect Edward Columbus Hosford, who is noted for the courthouses and other buildings that he designed in Florida, Georgia and Texas. He designed the 1914 renovations to the historic Bulloch County Courthouse in Statesboro.

On July 7, 1995, the house was added to the National Register of Historic Places. It is also part of the Savannah Avenue Historic District (NRHP #96001339).

The home's architectural classification is 19th Century/Neo-Classical Revival. The home is a two-and-a-half-stories with a partial basement and patterned slate roof, made from Pennsylvanian slate. The Donehoo-Brannen Mansion features ten bedrooms, six baths, a grand ballroom with curved staircase, huge formal dining room and large kitchen. The floor plan is asymmetrical. On the first floor there is a central entrance which enters into a large front parlor, but no central hall. On the second floor there is a more symmetrical arrangement with an L-shaped hall and an attic. There are two staircases - the main circular staircase connecting the first two floors and an L-shaped rear staircase which connects the rear of all three floors. The house retains most of its original materials. There is Tiger oak flooring on the first floor, and heart-pine flooring on the second. The house has 18-inch thick masonry walls and is built of common bond brick.

No historic outbuildings survive, though there were several at the time the house was completed: a carriage house, two servants quarters, a barn/stable, and a pigeon or dove cote. Many of these predated the current house and served the earlier residence of W. M. Foy which burned in 1915. By the late 1940s both servants quarters, the barn, and carriage house had been destroyed by fire or to make the right of way for the Grady Street entrance to the nearby hospital.

Since the Donehoo House completion in 1917, there have been few changes. During 1920-30 the back porch was enclosed. A support column was added in the drawing room, and a shower was added. During 1942-43 the upstairs hall was enclosed with doors and the kitchen remodeled. In the 1950s a bathroom was added to the music room and the kitchen remodeled again. There have been major repairs to the front columns and alterations to several capitals. In 1969 the carport was added; and in 1974 there were additional repairs. The house has been restored in the late 1980s-early 1990s.

== See also ==
- National Register of Historic Places listings in Bulloch County, Georgia
