= Old Belleair Town Hall =

- U.S. National Register of Historic Places
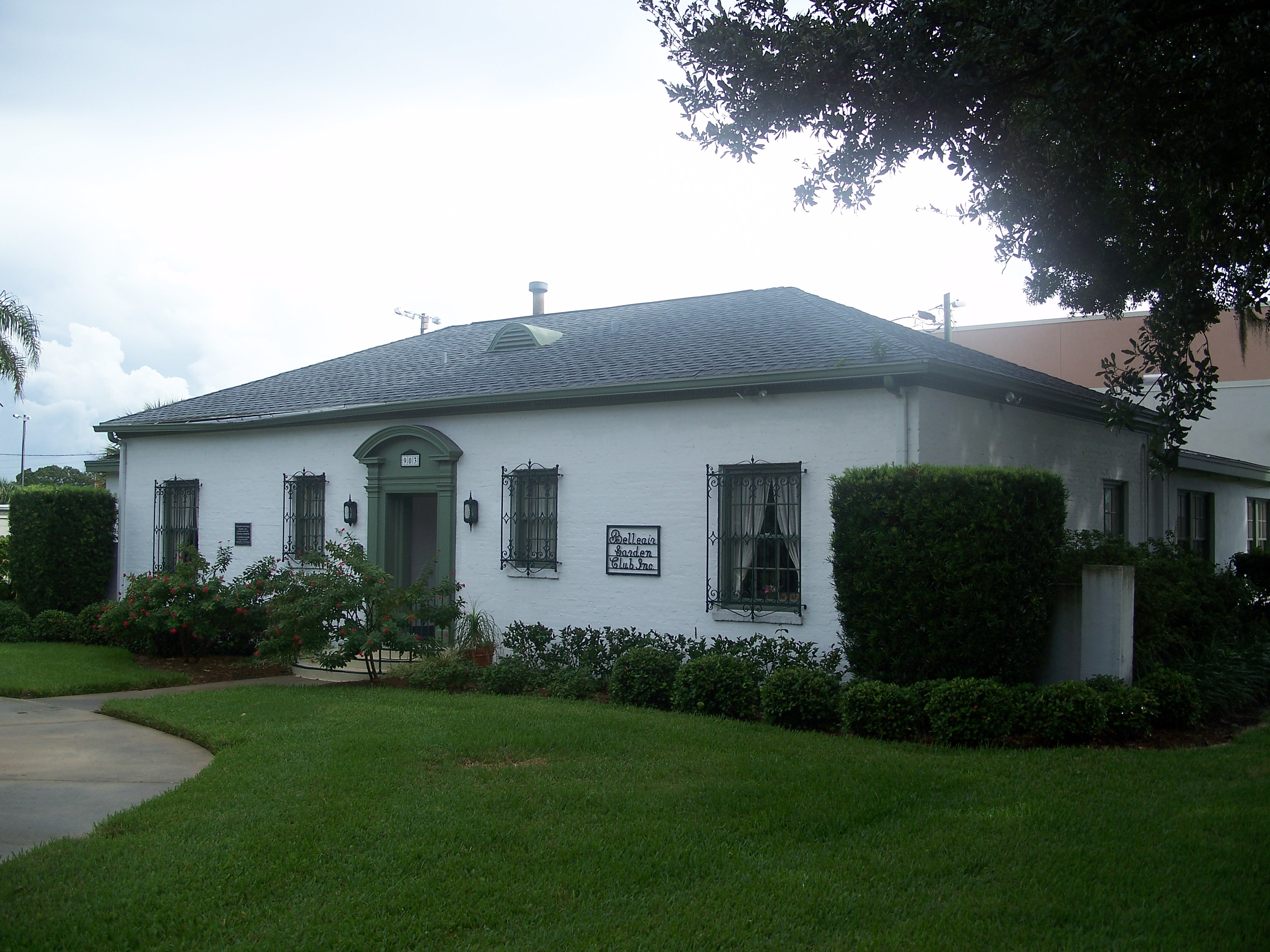

- Location within Florida Location within the United States
- Location: Belleair, Florida
- Coordinates: 27°56′5″N 82°48′14″W
- Area: 4,250 acres (17.2 km^{2})
- NRHP reference No.: 94000421
- Added to NRHP: May 6, 1994

The Old Belleair Town Hall (also known as the Belleair Garden Club) is a historic site in Belleair, Florida. It is located at 903 Ponce de Leon Boulevard. On May 6, 1994, it was added to the U.S. National Register of Historic Places. The current Town Hall is located next door at 901 Ponce de Leon Boulevard.
