= Holly Hill Municipal Building =

- U.S. National Register of Historic Places
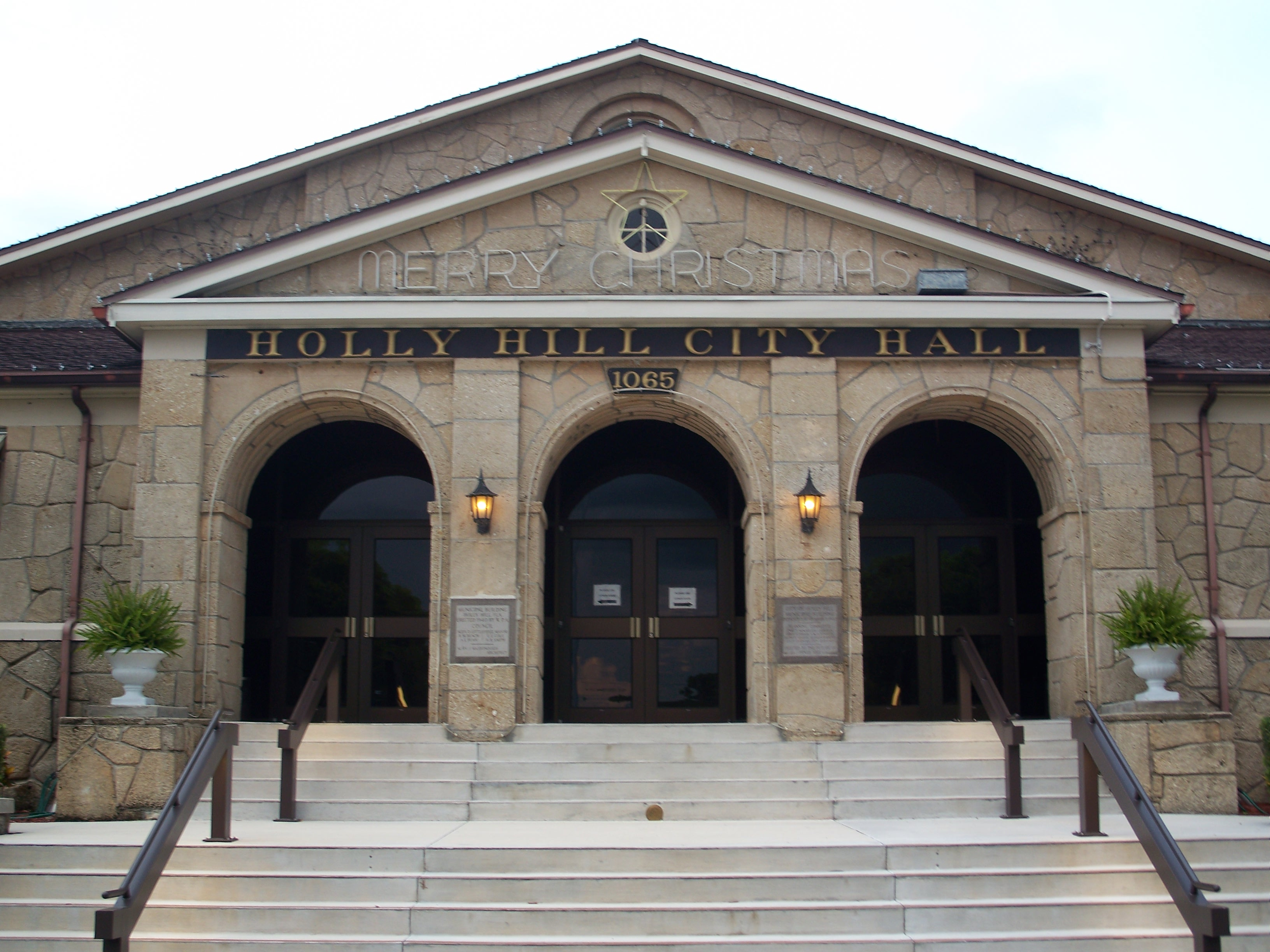

- Location within Volusia County
- Location: Holly Hill, Florida
- Coordinates: 29°14′43″N 81°2′25″W
- Built: 1942
- Architect: Alan J. MacDonough
- Architectural style: Masonry Vernacular
- NRHP reference No.: 93000285
- Added to NRHP: April 8, 1993

The Holly Hill Municipal Building (also known as the Holly Hill City Hall) is a historic building in Holly Hill, Florida, United States. It is located at 1065 Ridgewood Avenue. On April 8, 1993, it was added to the U.S. National Register of Historic Places.
