= Cedar Rapids City Hall and Library =

- U.S. National Register of Historic Places
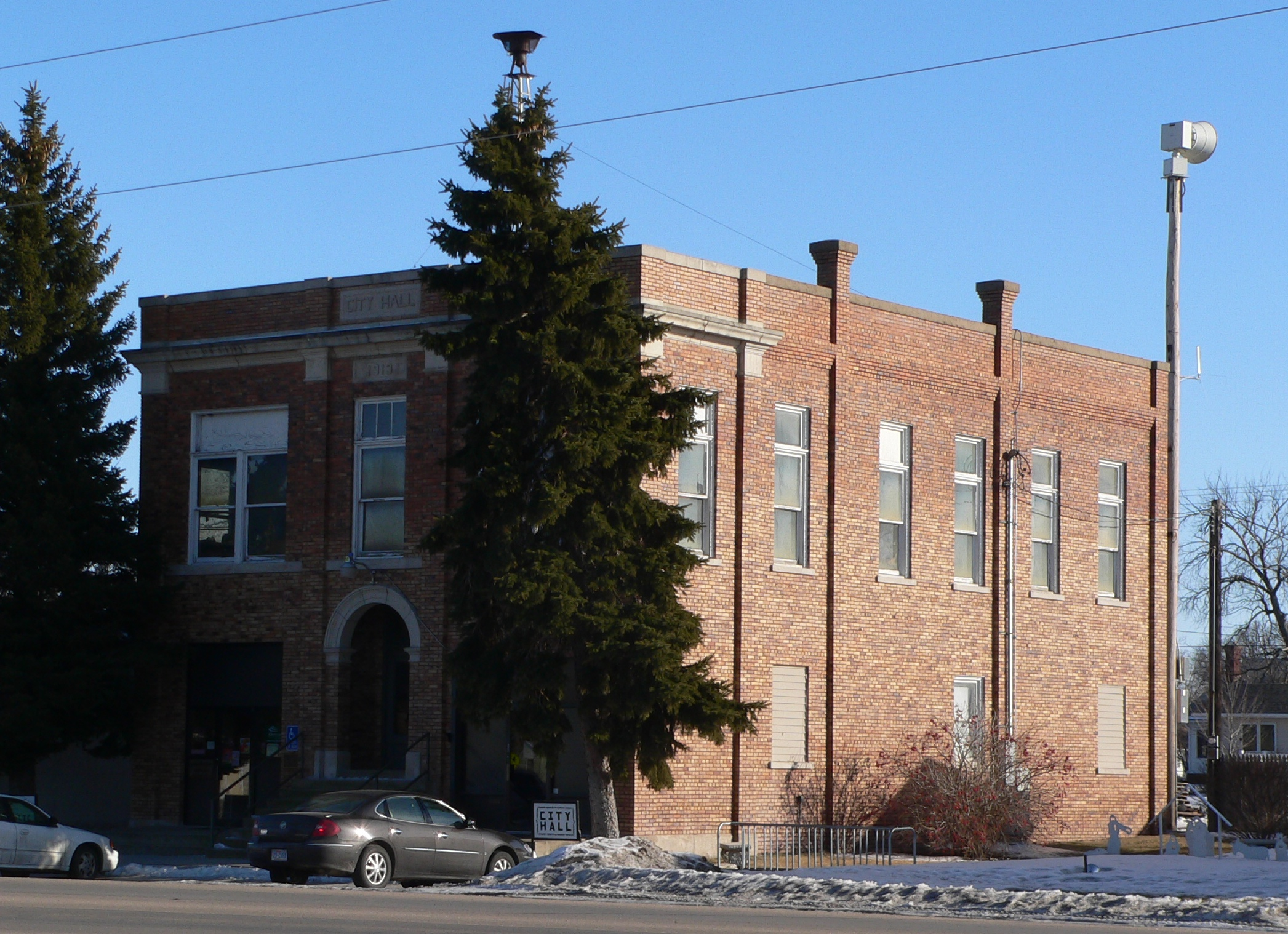

- Location within Nebraska Location within the United States
- Location: 423 W. Main St., Cedar Rapids, Nebraska
- Coordinates: 41.559764°N 98.148862°W
- Area: less than one acre
- Built: 1913
- Architectural style: Renaissance
- NRHP reference No.: 94000654
- Added to NRHP: July 1, 1994

The Cedar Rapids City Hall and Library, in Cedar Rapids in Boone County, Nebraska, was built in 1913. It was listed on the National Register of Historic Places in 1994.

It is a multi-function municipal hall featuring Italian Renaissance Revival architecture.

The building has a flat roof and parapets. It also was a fire station, with a wide garage door on the west side of the main facade. The area was converted in 1974 to office space. There was also a garage door at the rear of the building providing access to storage.

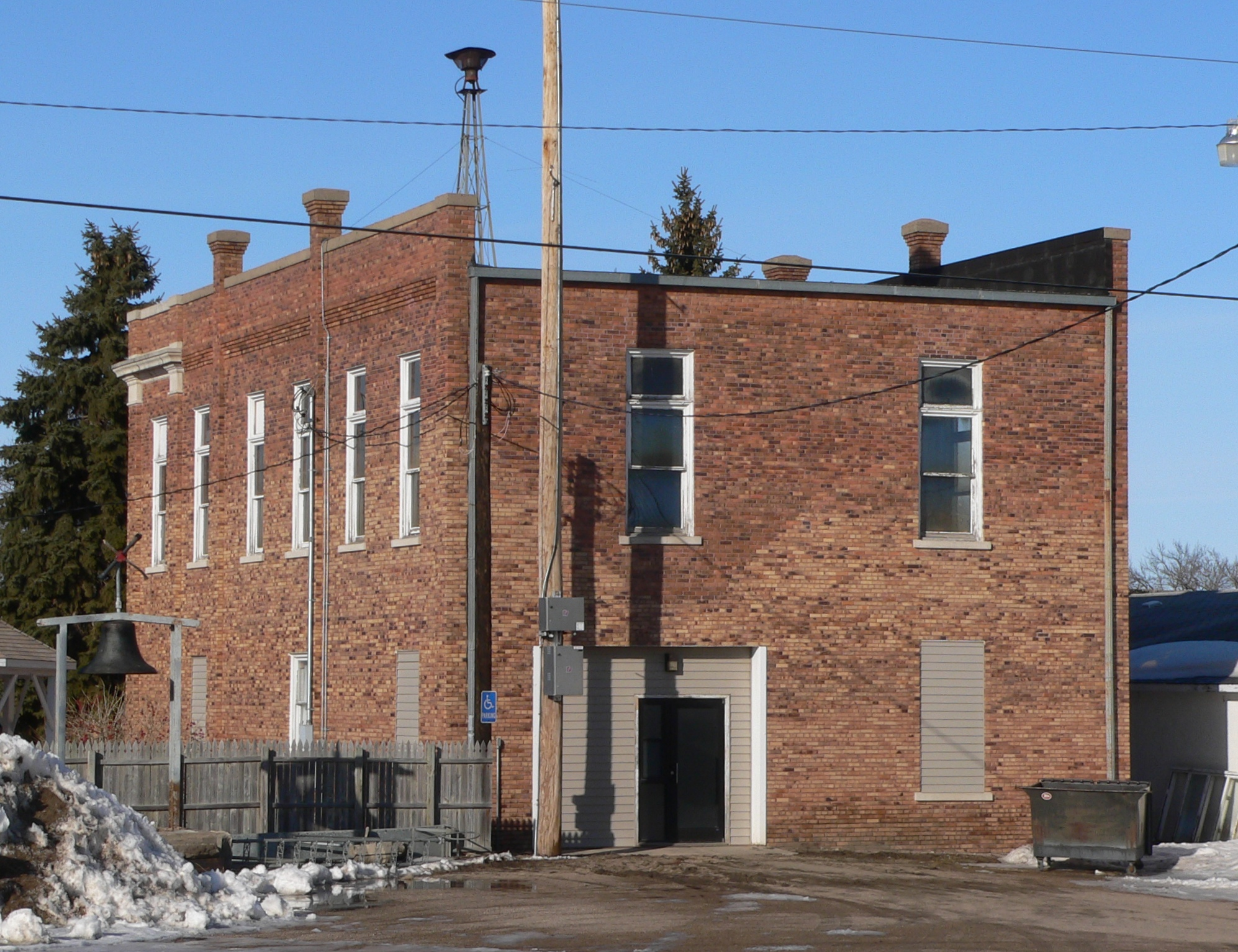
