= North Main Street Commercial Historic District (Statesboro, Georgia) =

Historic district in Georgia, United States

- U.S. National Register of Historic Places
- U.S. Historic district
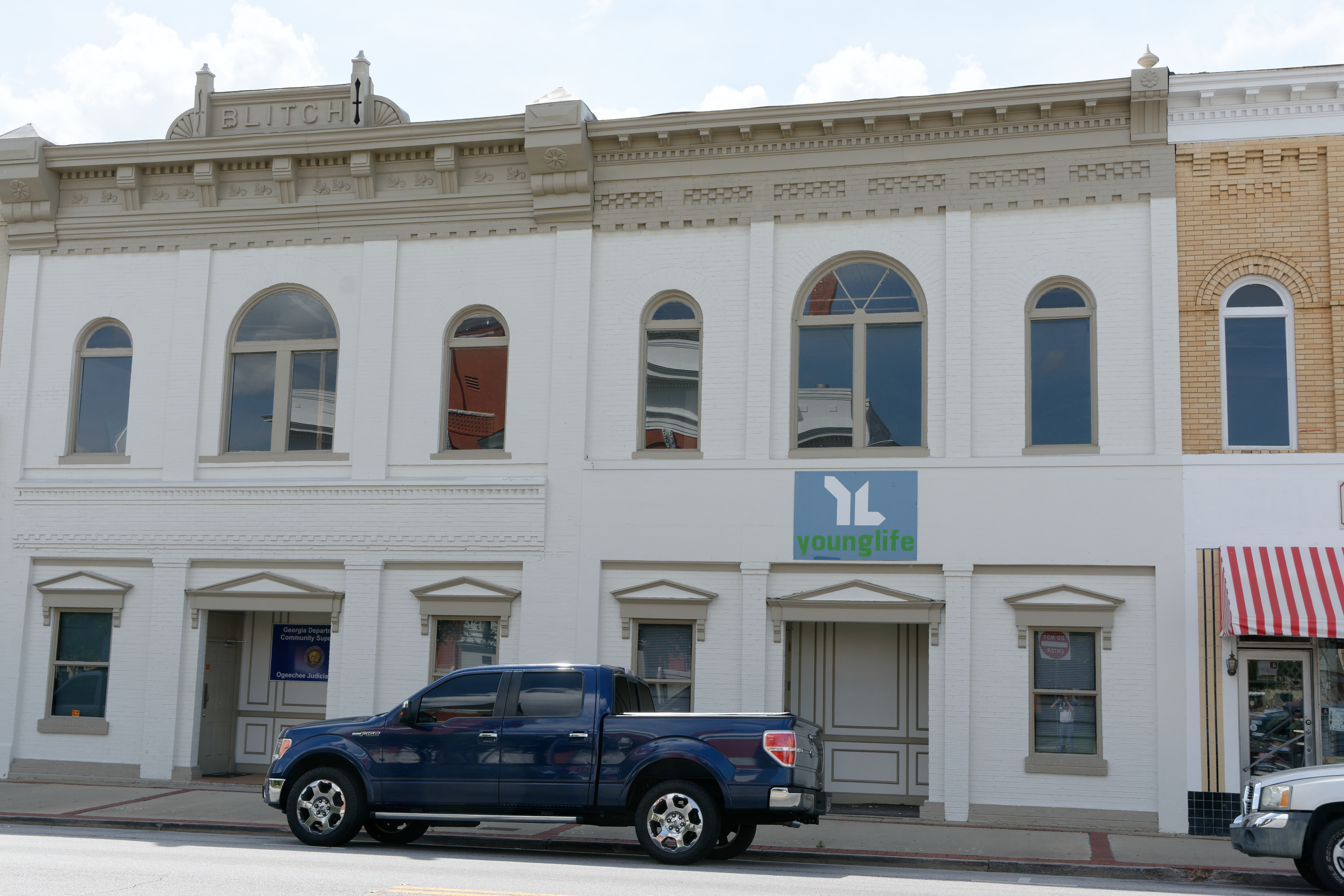
- The Blitch Building, 2017

- Location within Georgia Location within the United States
- Location: Roughly N. Main St. between Courtland and W. Main Sts., Statesboro, Georgia
- Coordinates: 32.449167°N 81.783333°W
- Area: less than one acre
- Built: c.1900
- Architect: Blackburn, L.R.
- Architectural style: Chicago, Italianate, Commercial Style
- MPS: Downtown Statesboro MPS
- NRHP reference No.: 89001159
- Added to NRHP: September 6, 1989

The North Main Street Commercial Historic District in Statesboro, Georgia is a historic district that was listed on the National Register of Historic Places in 1989. It includes eight adjacent contributing buildings on the west side of the first block of North Main Street. It does not include the property at the corner of West Main and North Main, but rather is the next eight buildings going north from that, to and including the corner of Courtland Street.

The buildings are one- and two-story brick commercial buildings with shared walls. The two-story ones have pressed-metal cornices. The main architectural style is Italianate, reflected in round-arched window openings. No original storefronts are present; all have been modernized.

Statesboro was the subject of a wider survey of historic resources completed at the same time as the NRHP nomination for the district.
