= Savannah Avenue Historic District =

Historic district in Georgia, United States

- U.S. National Register of Historic Places
- U.S. Historic district
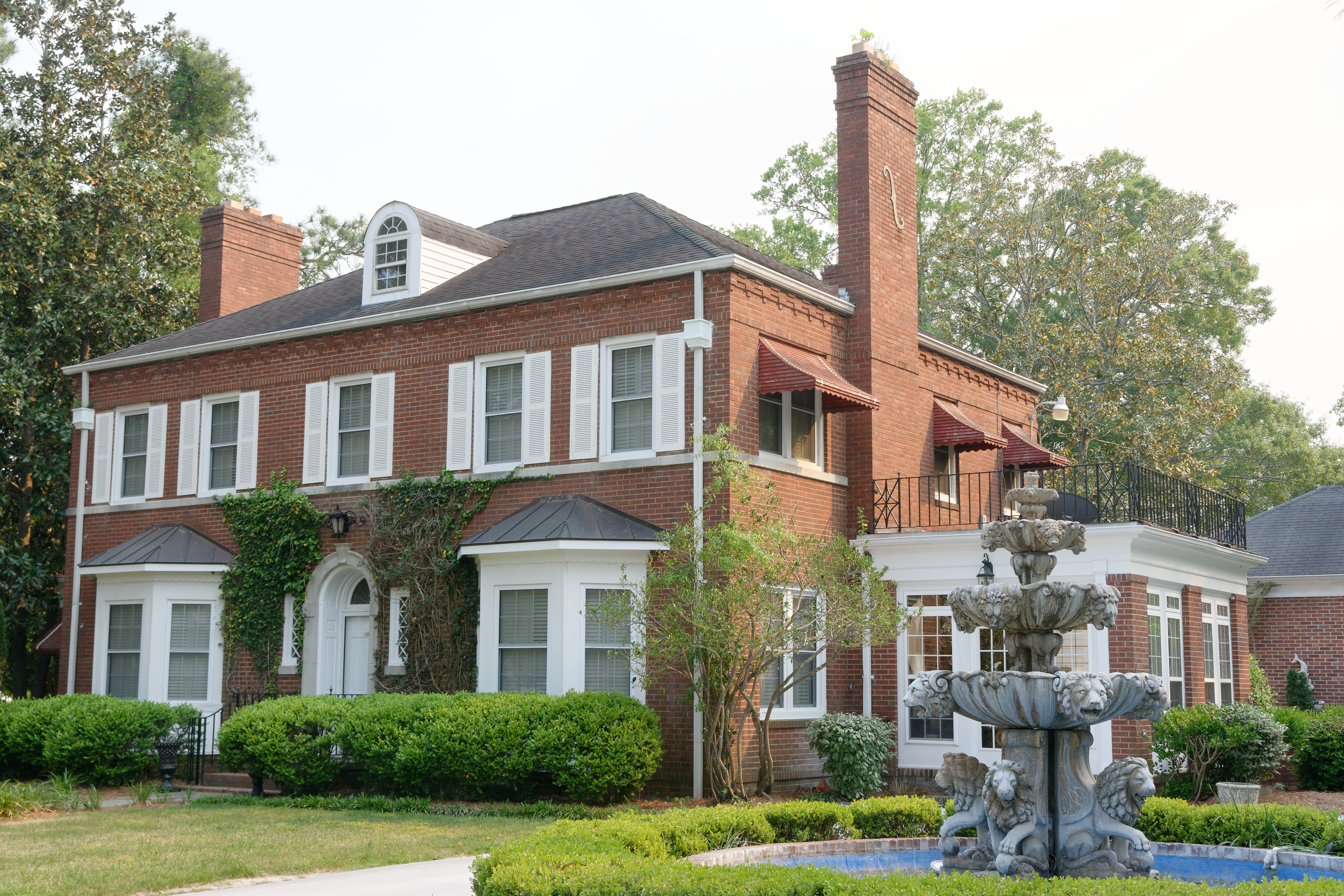

- Location within Georgia Location within the United States
- Location: Along Savannah Ave. and E. Grady St. between S. Crescent Cir., Statesboro, Georgia
- Coordinates: 32.443889°N 81.773333°W
- Area: 50 acres (20 ha)
- Built: 1920
- Architect: Edward C. Hosford & Co.; Walter Alred; others
- Architectural style: Colonial Revival, Tudor Revival, Bungalow/craftsman
- NRHP reference No.: 96001339
- Added to NRHP: November 15, 1996

The Savannah Avenue Historic District is a 50 acres (20 ha) historic district in Statesboro, Georgia which was listed on the National Register of Historic Places in 1996. It then included 49 contributing buildings and 29 non-contributing ones.

It includes the Donehoo-Brannen House, 332 Savannah Avenue, separately listed on the NRHP, which was designed by Edward C. Hosford & Company.

Houses at 322, 326, and 340 Savannah Avenue were designed by architect Walter Alred.
