= Jaeckel Hotel =

- U.S. National Register of Historic Places
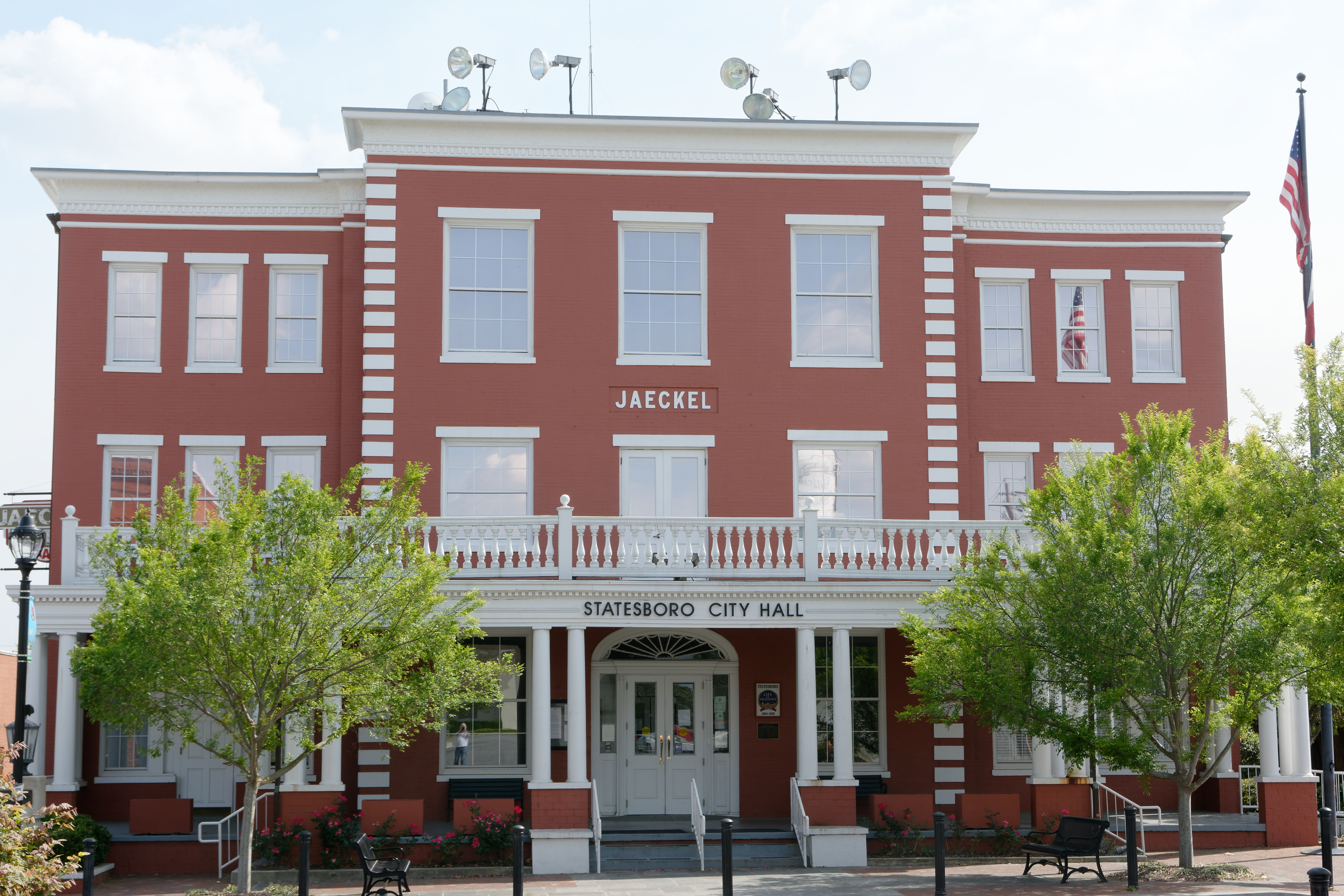

- Location within Georgia
- Location: 50 E. Main St., Statesboro, Georgia
- Coordinates: 32.44853°N 81.78158°W
- Area: 0.6 acres (0.24 ha)
- Built: 1905
- Built by: A.J. Franklin (general contractor); J. Roy Blackburn (masonry)
- Architectural style: Classical Revival
- NRHP reference No.: 82002389
- Added to NRHP: June 17, 1982

The Jaeckel Hotel is a historic hotel in Statesboro, Georgia that is now being used as Statesboro City Hall. It is located at 50 East Main Street.

The hotel was built in 1905 and it is three stories tall built of terra cotta block with brick veneer. The building faces Main Street, where it has a Neoclassical porch. The building was renovated sometime after 1939 when the columns were removed and shortened and the capitals were removed. The interior is details in Neoclassical style. The ceilings are pressed tin. In 1935 a three-story addition was added in the back. An elevator was added in 1939.

The hotel served as the center of local social life in the early part of the 20th century. William Jennings Bryan, Cornelius Vanderbilt and Henry Ford stayed at the hotel.

An adjacent small lot was acquired in 1910; on the rear of it a "Drummers' Building" was built of brick. It had three display rooms used by traveling salesmen ("drummers") who could stay at the hotel and store and sell their merchandise there. The merchants arrived by roadway or by the railroad.

The sidewalk in front of the hotel and the Drummers' Building is the only surviving section of hexagonal block sidewalk, from approximately the turn of the 20th century, that remains in the city.

The property, including Drummers' Building and sidewalk, was added to the National Register of Historic Places on June 17, 1982, as "Jaeckel Hotel".

The building is now the Statesboro City Hall. In 2016, the City Council had its twice-monthly meetings in the City Council Room on the second floor of the building. Also meeting there, on a monthly basis, were two committees, the Statesboro Planning Commission and the city's Alcohol Control Board. At least two committees, the Statesboro Beautification Commission and the Tree Committee, held their regular monthly meetings in the Drummers' Building.

== See also ==
- Statesboro City Hall and Fire Station, which includes a former city hall, also NRHP-listed
- National Register of Historic Places listings in Bulloch County, Georgia
