= Statesboro City Hall and Fire Station =

- U.S. National Register of Historic Places
- Location within Georgia
- Location: Siebald and Courtland Sts., Statesboro, Georgia
- Coordinates: 32°26′59″N 81°46′56″W
- Area: less than one acre
- Built: 1911
- MPS: Downtown Statesboro MPS
- NRHP reference No.: 89001162
- Added to NRHP: September 6, 1989

The Statesboro City Hall and Fire Station (now the Bulloch County Emergency Medical Services building) is a historic structure in Statesboro, Georgia. It is located at the corner of Siebald Street and Courtland Street, immediately northeast of the courthouse square. It is a one-story brick building of commercial design. It was built in 1911 as the city stables and remodeled several times. In 1933 there was a major addition and the whole structure may have been rebuilt. The city government and fire department once occupied this building. An awning was added before 1966 and a vehicle bay was added in 1970.

It was added to the National Register of Historic Places on September 6, 1989. The Statesboro City Hall is now located in the former Jaeckel Hotel building. The building was demolished before 1997.

== See also ==
- National Register of Historic Places listings in Bulloch County, Georgia
