= Town Hall (Westport, Connecticut) =

- Westport CT - Old Town Hall
- U.S. National Register of Historic Places
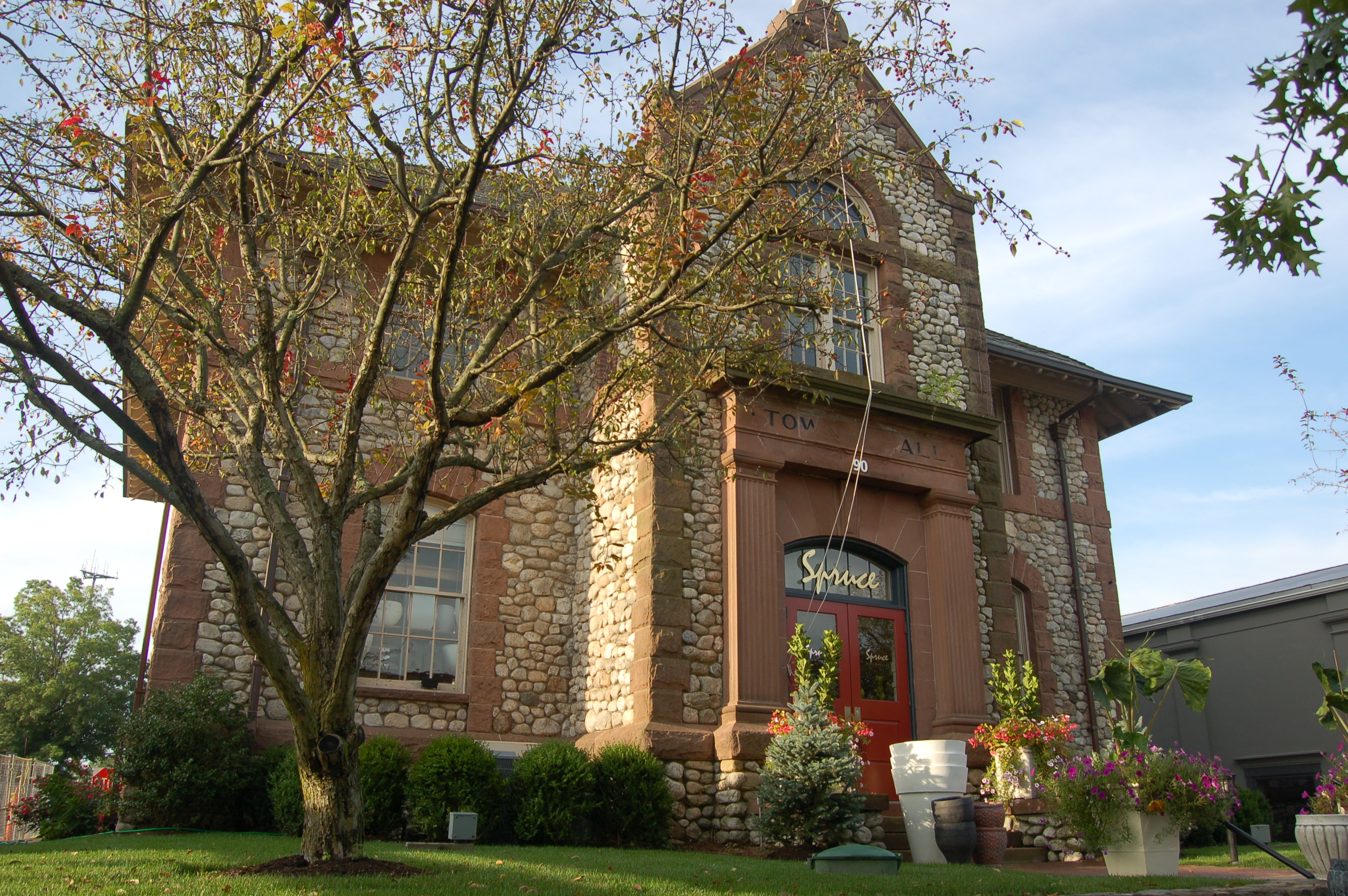

- Location within Connecticut Location within the United States
- Map showing the location of Old Town Hall
- Location: 90 Post Road East, Westport, Connecticut
- Coordinates: 41°08′27.9″N 73°21′37.8″W
- Area: 0.4 acres (0.16 ha)
- Built: 1909
- Built by: Ralson & St. John
- Architect: Brown & von Beren
- Architectural style: Classical Revival
- NRHP reference No.: 82004343
- Added to NRHP: May 18, 1982

The Old Town Hall is a historic former municipal building at 90 Post Road East in Westport, Connecticut. It was completed in 1909 as the town's first purpose-built municipal office building. In 1908 the lot was acquired by the town and plans for the new building were solicited from architects. The building committee selected the proposal of Brown & von Beren of New Haven. Proposals were also received from Meloy & Beckwith, Ernest G. Southey and John R. Taylor of Bridgeport. The architectural design of the building is unusual for using cobblestones within a design that is, overall, Classical Revival in style. The building contract was let to Ralston & St. John of Westport and the completed building was first used for town meetings in May 1909.

In 1979 Westport moved its municipal offices to a rehabilitated grade school building on Myrtle Avenue. The building has been occupied by several restaurants in the past, and is currently occupied by Massi Co., a Neapolitan restaurant, and Walrus Alley, a southern-style BBQ restaurant and bar.

The building was listed on the National Register of Historic Places in 1982.

== See also ==
- National Register of Historic Places listings in Fairfield County, Connecticut
