= Sol Akins Farm =

Historic farm in Georgia, US

- Akins, Sol, Farm
- U.S. National Register of Historic Places
- U.S. Historic district
- Location within Georgia
- Location: Old Register Rd. off US 301, 1.2 mi. S of Statesboro, Georgia
- Coordinates: 32.4057°N 81.8031°W
- Area: 78 acres (32 ha)
- Built: c.1864, 1880s
- Built by: Akins, Solomon
- Architectural style: Plantation Plain
- NRHP reference No.: 90000487
- Added to NRHP: March 22, 1990

The Sol Akins Farm near Statesboro in Bulloch County, Georgia dates from c.1864. It was listed on the National Register of Historic Places in 1990.

The Sol Akins House is a two-story Plantation Plain-style house with brick exterior chimneys at its ends, and a rear ell, and a Z-shaped back porch. It was added in the 1880s onto an original c.1864 one-story four-room dogtrot log house. The listing includes a second contributing building, which is a c. 1864 double-crib log barn, and a cemetery.

It is located on private property.
