= Chula Vista City Hall =

Seat of government for Chula Vista, California, US

Coordinates: 32.64066°N 117.08578°W

- Interactive map of the Chula Vista City Hall area

General information
- Type: Seat of local government
- Location: Chula Vista, California, 276 Fourth Avenue
- Completed: 1951
- Owner: City of Chula Vista

Chula Vista City Hall is the seat of the government of the city of Chula Vista, California. It houses the five members of city council, which includes the mayor.

The city hall was built in 1923 on Third Avenue in the recently incorporated city. It was replaced by a new structure in 1951 at a cost of around $99,000. The city hall initially also served as the headquarters for the fire and police departments.
