= Crystal River Old City Hall =

- U.S. National Register of Historic Places
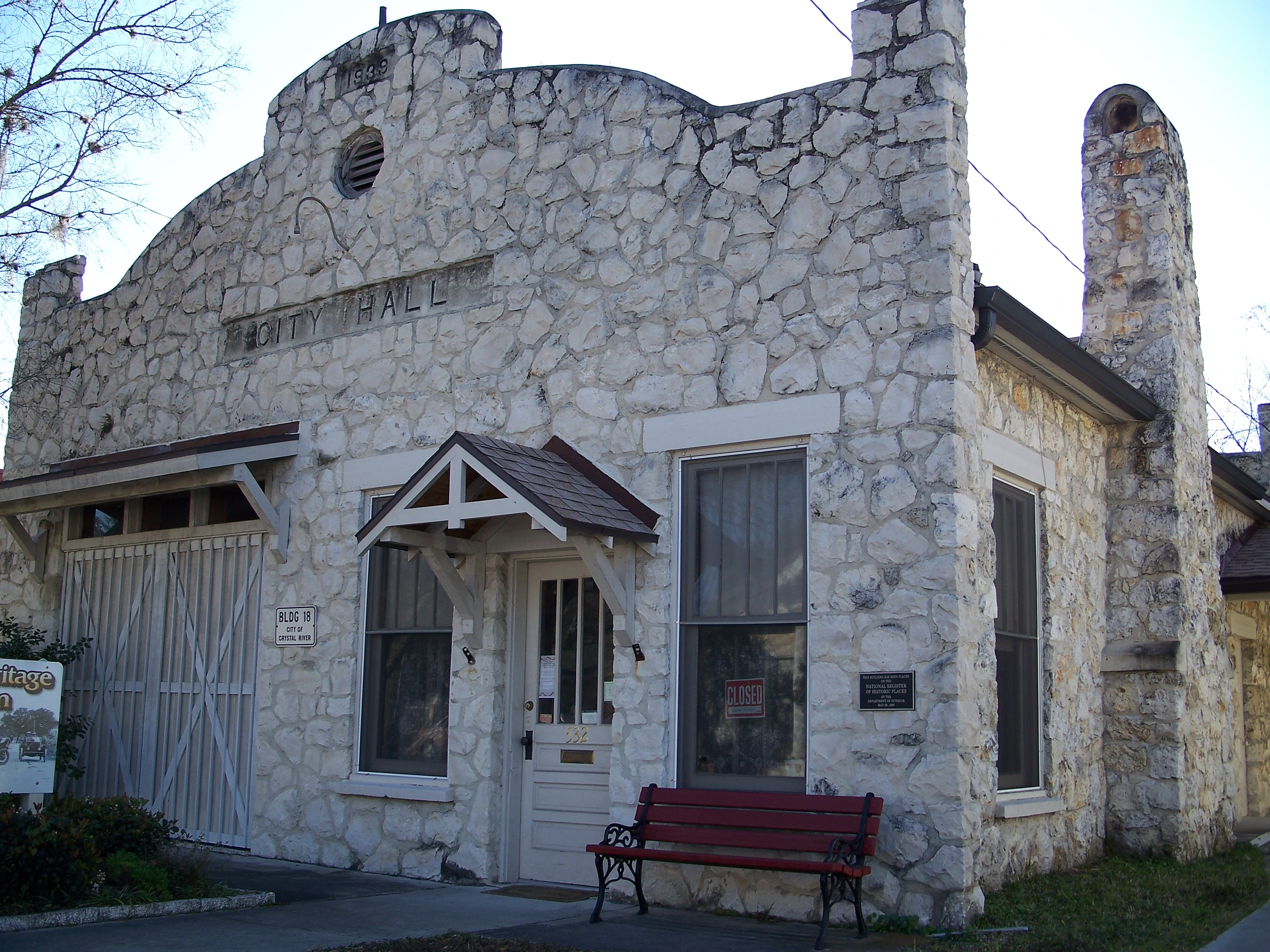

- Location within Florida Location within the United States
- Interactive map showing the location of Crystal River Old City Hall
- Location: Crystal River, Florida
- Coordinates: 28°53′55″N 82°35′36″W
- Built: 1939
- Architect: Works Progress Administration
- Architectural style: Mission/Spanish Revival
- NRHP reference No.: 98000588
- Added to NRHP: May 29, 1998

The Crystal River Old City Hall is a historic building in Crystal River, Florida, in the United States. It is located at 532 North Citrus Avenue, off U.S. 19/98. On May 29, 1998, it was added to the National Register of Historic Places.

The building now houses the Coastal Heritage Museum, operated by the Citrus County Historical Society. Exhibits focus on the early history of the west side of Citrus County, Florida and include a 1929 diorama of downtown Citrus Avenue, a fish house facade, and an original jail cell. Admission is free.
