= West Main Street Commercial Historic District (Statesboro, Georgia) =

Historic district in Georgia, United States

- U.S. National Register of Historic Places
- U.S. Historic district
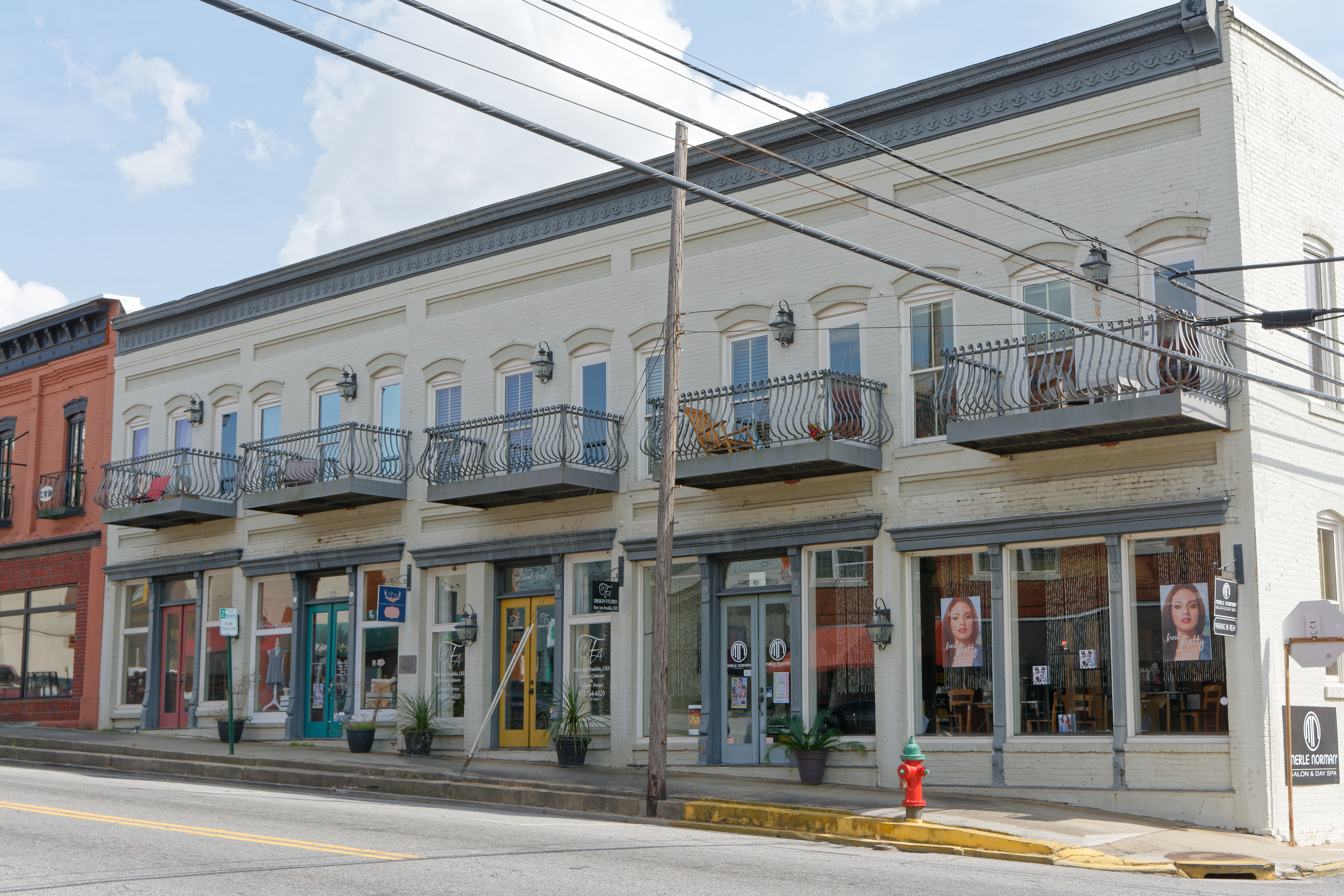
- The Brannen Building, 2017

- Location within Georgia Location within the United States
- Location: Roughly W. Main St. between Walnut and N. and S. Main Sts., Statesboro, Georgia
- Coordinates: 32°26′56″N 81°47′3″W
- Area: less than one acre
- Built: 1905-1923
- Built by: Blackburn, L.R.
- Architectural style: Italianate, Commercial
- MPS: Downtown Statesboro MPS
- NRHP reference No.: 89001164
- Added to NRHP: September 6, 1989

The West Main Street Commercial Historic District is a historic district consisting of five brick buildings in downtown Statesboro, Georgia that were built between 1905 and 1923 and that hold a total of 16 storefronts. It was listed on the National Register of Historic Places in 1989.

The "most outstanding" is the Brannen Building, on the south side of West Main St. running east from the corner of Walnut, which hosts a row of five storefronts. The storefronts have pressed metal pilasters and cornices.

The next two buildings further east, each with three storefronts, are also included. And the first two buildings on the north side of West Main St. running east, with three and two storefronts respectively. Four of the buildings are two-story and one is one-story. Some were built by local builder L.R. Blackburn.

Statesboro was the subject of a wider survey of historic resources completed at the same time as the NRHP nomination for the district.
