= Main Street Historic District =

Main Street Historic District or Old Main Street Historic District may refer to:

- Main Street Historic District (Tuskegee, Alabama)
- Main Street Historic District (Bristol, Connecticut)
- Main Street Historic District (Cromwell, Connecticut)
- Main Street Historic District (Danbury, Connecticut)
- Main Street Historic District (Durham, Connecticut)
- Main Street Historic District (Manchester, Connecticut)
- Main Street Historic District (Middletown, Connecticut)
- Main Street Historic District (Willimantic, Connecticut), in the town of Windham
- Main Street Historic District (Tampico, Illinois)
- Old Main Street Historic District (Dubuque, Iowa)
- Main Street Historic District (Murray, Kentucky), listed on the NRHP in Calloway County
- Main Street Historic District (Baton Rouge, Louisiana)
- Main Street Historic District (Broussard, Louisiana)
- Main Street Historic District (Auburn, Maine)
- Main Street Historic District (Damariscotta, Maine)
- Main Street Historic District (Fryeburg, Maine)
- Main Street Historic District (Rockland, Maine)
- Main Street Historic District (Easthampton, Massachusetts)
- Main Street Historic District (Greenfield, Massachusetts)
- Main Street Historic District (Haverhill, Massachusetts)
- Main Street Historic District (Millville, Massachusetts)
- Main Street Historic District (Stockbridge, Massachusetts)
- Main Street Historic District (Webster, Massachusetts)
- Main Street Historic District (Flushing, Michigan)
- Main Street Historic District (Menominee, Michigan), listed on the NRHP as the "First Street Historic District"
- Main Street Historic District (Milan, Michigan)
- Main Street Historic District (Bay St. Louis, Mississippi)
- Main Street Historic District (Vicksburg, Mississippi), listed on the NRHP in Warren County
- Main Street Historic District (Bozeman, Montana), listed on the NRHP in Gallatin County
- Main Street Historic District (Miles City, Montana)
- Main Street Historic District (Red Cloud, Nebraska), listed on the NRHP in Webster County
- Main Street Historic District (Addison, New York)
- Main Street Historic District (Afton, New York)
- Main Street Historic District (Brockport, New York)
- Main Street Historic District (Cold Spring Harbor, New York)
- Main Street Historic District (Cuba, New York)
- Main Street Historic District (Geneseo, New York)
- Main Street Historic District (McGraw, New York)
- Main Street Historic District (Medina, New York)
- Main Street Historic District (Millerton, New York)
- Main Street Historic District (New Hamburg, New York)
- Main Street Historic District (Roslyn, New York)
- Main Street Historic District (Roxbury, New York)
- Main Street Historic District (Stone Ridge, New York)
- Main Street Historic District (Whitehall, New York)
- Main Street Historic District (Brevard, North Carolina)
- Main Street Historic District (Forest City, North Carolina)
- Main Street Historic District (Hendersonville, North Carolina)
- Main Street Historic District (Marion, North Carolina)
- Main Street Historic District (Rutherfordton, North Carolina)
- Main Street Historic District (Bowling Green, Ohio), listed on the NRHP in Wood County
- Main Street Historic District (Genoa, Ohio), listed on the NRHP in Ottawa County
- Main Street Historic District (Spring Valley, Ohio), listed on the NRHP in Greene County
- Main Street Historic District (Westerly, Rhode Island)
- Main Street Historic District (Woonsocket, Rhode Island)
- Main Street Historic District (Newberry, South Carolina)
- Main Street Historic District (Chappell Hill, Texas)
- Main Street Historic District (Darlington, Wisconsin)
- Main Street Historic District (Fort Atkinson)
- Main Street Historic District (Lake Geneva, Wisconsin)
- Main Street Historic District (Mayville, Wisconsin)
- Main Street Historic District (Menomonee Falls, Wisconsin)
- Old Main Street Historic District (Racine, Wisconsin)
- Main Street Historic District (Thiensville, Wisconsin)
- Main Street Historic District (Trempealeau, Wisconsin)
- Main Street Historic District (Waupaca, Wisconsin)
- Main Street Historic District (Whitewater, Wisconsin)
- Mathias Mitchell Public Square–Main Street Historic District
- Main Street Historic District (Buffalo, Wyoming)

== See also ==
- Downtown Main Street Historic District (disambiguation)
- East Main Street Historic District (disambiguation)
- Lower Main Street Commercial Historic District, Boise, Idaho, U.S.
- Main Avenue Historic District (disambiguation)
- North Main Street Historic District (disambiguation)
- South Main Street Historic District (disambiguation)
- Upper Main Street Historic District (disambiguation)
- West Main Street Historic District (disambiguation)
