= East Main Street Historic District =

East Main Street Historic District, or variations with Residential or Commercial, may refer to:

- Batesville East Main Historic District, Batesville, AR, listed on the NRHP in Arkansas
- East Main Street Historic District (Bridgeport, Connecticut), listed on the NRHP in Connecticut
- East Main Street-Johnson Street Historic District, Hogansville, GA, listed on the NRHP in Georgia
- East Main Street Residential Historic District (Lumpkin, Georgia), listed on the NRHP in Georgia
- East Main Street Residential District (Marshallville, Georgia), listed on the NRHP in Georgia
- East Main Street Commercial Historic District (Statesboro, Georgia), listed on the NRHP in Georgia
- East Main Street-Glen Miller Park Historic District, Richmond, IN, listed on the NRHP in Indiana
- Upper East Main Street District, Bowling Green, KY, listed on the NRHP in Kentucky
- East Main Street Historic District (Danville, Kentucky), listed on the NRHP in Kentucky
- East Main Street Historic District (Wilmore, Kentucky), listed on the NRHP in Kentucky
- East Main Street Historic District (New Iberia, Louisiana), listed on the NRHP in Louisiana
- East Main Street Historic District (Searsport, Maine), listed on the NRHP in Maine
- East Main-High Street Historic District, Greenfield, MA, listed on the NRHP in Massachusetts
- East Main Street-Cherry Street Historic District, Spencer, MA, listed on the NRHP in Massachusetts
- East Main-Cherry Street Historic District, Spencer, MA, listed on the NRHP in Massachusetts
- East Main Street Historic District (Waltham, Massachusetts), listed on the NRHP in Massachusetts
- East Main Street Historic District (West Point, Mississippi), listed on the NRHP in Mississippi
- East Main Street Residential Historic District (Miles City, Montana), listed on the NRHP in Montana
- East Main Street Historic District (Richfield Springs, New York), listed on the NRHP in New York
- East Main Street Commercial Historic District (Palmyra, New York), listed on the NRHP in New York
- East Main-Mechanic Streets Historic District, Springville, NY, listed on the NRHP in New York
- East Main Street Historic District (Westfield, New York), listed on the NRHP in New York
- East Main Street Historic District (Brevard, North Carolina), listed on the NRHP in North Carolina
- East Main Street Historic District (Forest City, North Carolina), listed on the NRHP in North Carolina
- East Main Street Historic District (Hillsboro, Ohio), listed on the NRHP in Ohio
- East Main Street Historic District (Ravenna, Ohio), listed on the NRHP in Ohio
- East Main Street Historic District (Chesterfield, South Carolina), listed on the NRHP in South Carolina
- East Main Street-Douglass Heights Historic District, Union, SC, listed on the NRHP in South Carolina
- East Main Street and Exchange Street Historic District, Union City, TN, listed on the NRHP in Tennessee
- East Main Street Historic District (Jackson, Tennessee), listed on the NRHP in Tennessee
- East Main Street Historic District (Murfreesboro, Tennessee), listed on the NRHP in Tennessee
- East Main Street Residential Historic District (Cuero, Texas), listed on the NRHP in Texas
- East Main Street Historic District (Pflugerville, Texas), listed on the NRHP in Travis County, Texas
- East Main Street Historic District (Christiansburg, Virginia), listed on the NRHP in Virginia

== See also ==
- Georgetown East Main Street Residential District, Georgetown, KY, listed on the NRHP in Kentucky
- Main Street Historic District (disambiguation)
- North Main Street Historic District (disambiguation)
- South Main Street Historic District (disambiguation)
- West Main Street Historic District (disambiguation)
