= Madison Historic District =

Madison Historic District may refer to:

in the United States

(by state)

- Madison Station Historic District, Madison, Alabama, listed on the National Register of Historic Places (NRHP) in Madison County, Alabama
- Madison Green Historic District, Madison, Connecticut, listed on the NRHP in New Haven County, Connecticut
- Madison Historic District (Madison, Georgia), NRHP-listed
- Madison Historic District (Madison, Indiana), a National Historic Landmark in Indiana
- Fort Madison Downtown Commercial Historic District, Fort Madison, Iowa, listed on the NRHP in Iowa
- Madison Civic Commercial District, Madison, New Jersey, listed on the NRHP in New Jersey
- Madison County Fairgrounds, Twin Bridges, Montana, listed on the NRHP in Madison County, Montana
- Madison-Putnam-60th Place Historic District, New York, New York, NRHP-listed
- Madison Square-West Main Street Historic District, Rochester, New York, NRHP-listed
- Madison-Stewart Historic District, Cincinnati, Ohio, NRHP-listed
- Madison and Woodburn Historic District, Cincinnati, Ohio, NRHP-listed
- Madison Avenue Historic District, Toledo, Ohio, listed on the NRHP in Lucas County, Ohio
- Madison Historic District (Madison, South Dakota), listed on the NRHP in Lake County, South Dakota
- Madison Ranch, Rapid City, South Dakota, a historic district listed on the NRHP in Pennington County, South Dakota
- Madison Street Historic District (Clarksville, Tennessee), NRHP-listed
- Madison-Monroe Historic District, Memphis, Tennessee, listed on the NRHP in Shelby County, Tennessee
- Madison-Barbour Rural Historic District, Barboursville, Virginia, listed on the NRHP in Orange County, Virginia
- Madison Farm Historic and Archeological District, Elliston, Virginia, listed on the NRHP in Montgomery County, Virginia
- Madison County Courthouse Historic District, Madison, Virginia, listed on the NRHP in Madison County, Virginia
- Madison Street Historic District (Waukesha, Wisconsin), listed on the NRHP in Waukesha County, Wisconsin

== See also ==
- Madison Street Historic District (disambiguation)
