= Madison Street Historic District =

Madison Street Historic District may refer to:

- Madison Street Historic District (Clarksville, Tennessee), listed on the National Register of Historic Places (NRHP)
- Madison Street Historic District (Waukesha, Wisconsin), listed on the NRHP in Waukesha County, Wisconsin

== See also ==
- Madison Historic District (disambiguation)
