= South Main Street Historic District =

South Main Street Historic District may refer to:

- South Main Street Apartments Historic District, Little Rock, Arkansas
- South Main Street Commercial Historic District (Little Rock, Arkansas)
- South Main Street Residential Historic District (Little Rock, Arkansas)
- South Main and Washington Streets Historic District, Norwalk, Connecticut
- South Main-South Lee Streets Historic District, Fitzgerald, Georgia
- South Main Street Historic District (Statesboro, Georgia), listed on the National Register of Historic Places
- South Main Street Residential Historic District (Statesboro, Georgia)
- South Main Street Historic District (Watkinsville, Georgia)
- South Main and South Elm Streets Historic District, Henderson, Kentucky, listed on the National Register of Historic Places
- South Main Street Historic District (Versailles, Kentucky), listed on the National Register of Historic Places
- South Main Street Historic District (Walton, Kentucky), listed on the National Register of Historic Places
- South Main Historic District (Grenada, Mississippi), listed on the National Register of Historic Places
- South Main Street Historic District (Fayette, Missouri)
- South Main Street Historic District (Joplin, Missouri)
- South Main Street Historic District (Kernersville, North Carolina)
- South Main Street Historic District (Geneva, New York)
- South Main Street Historic District (Mount Morris, New York)
- South Main Street District (Middletown, Ohio)
- South Main Street District (Poland, Ohio), listed on the National Register of Historic Places
- South Main Street Commercial Historic District (Pendleton, Oregon), listed on the National Register of Historic Places
- South Main Street Historic District (Coventry, Rhode Island)
- South Main Street Historic District (Woonsocket, Rhode Island)
- South Main Historic District (Bishopville, South Carolina)
- South Main Street Historic District (Covington, Tennessee), listed on the National Register of Historic Places
- South Main Street Historic District (Memphis, Tennessee)
- South Main Street Historic District (Pikeville, Tennessee) listed on the National Register of Historic Places
- South Main Street Historic District (Fort Worth, Texas) listed on the National Register of Historic Places
- South Main Street Historic District (Fond du Lac, Wisconsin)
- South Main Street Historic District (Janesville, Wisconsin)
- South Main Street Historic District (Oregon, Wisconsin)

== See also ==
- South Main Street District (disambiguation)
- South Main Street Commercial Historic District (disambiguation)
- South Main Street Residential Historic District (disambiguation)
- Main Street Historic District (disambiguation)
- North Main Street Historic District (disambiguation)
- East Main Street Historic District (disambiguation)
- West Main Street Historic District (disambiguation)
