= West Main Street Historic District =

West Main Street Historic District, or West Main Street District or variations, may refer to:

== United States (by state then city) ==
=== Georgia ===
- West Main Street Commercial Historic District (Statesboro, Georgia), listed on the National Register of Historic Places (NRHP) in Bulloch County

=== Kentucky ===
- West Main Street Historic District (Georgetown, Kentucky), listed on the NRHP in Scott County, Kentucky
- West Main Street District (Greenup, Kentucky), listed on the National Register of Historic Places in Greenup County, Kentucky
- West Main Street Historic District (Louisville, Kentucky), NRHP-listed

=== Massachusetts ===
- West Main Street Historic District (Marlborough, Massachusetts), NRHP-listed in Middlesex County
- West Main Street Historic District (Westborough, Massachusetts), NRHP-listed in Worcester County

=== North Carolina ===
- West Main Street Historic District (Forest City, North Carolina), NRHP-listed in Rutherford County
- West Main Street Historic District (Lincolnton, North Carolina), NRHP-listed in Lincoln County

=== Ohio ===
- West Main Street District (Kent, Ohio), NRHP-listed in Portage County
- Lancaster West Main Street Historic District, Lancaster, Ohio, listed on the NRHP in Fairfield County
- West Main Street District (Norwalk, Ohio), listed on the National Register of Historic Places in Huron County

=== South Carolina ===
- West Main Street Historic District (Chesterfield, South Carolina), NRHP-listed in Chesterfield County

=== Virginia ===
- West Main Street Historic District (Charlottesville, Virginia), NRHP-listed

=== Wisconsin ===
- West Main Street Historic District (Oconto, Wisconsin), NRHP-listed in Oconto County
- West Main Street Historic District (Platteville, Wisconsin), listed on the NRHP in Grant County

== See also ==
- Madison Square–West Main Street Historic District, NRHP-listed in Monroe County, New York
- West Main Street–West James Street Historic District, NRHP-listed in Otsego County, New York
- Main Street Historic District (disambiguation)
- North Main Street Historic District (disambiguation)
- South Main Street Historic District (disambiguation)
- East Main Street Historic District (disambiguation)
