= South Main Street Residential Historic District =

South Main Street Residential Historic District may refer to:

- South Main Street Residential Historic District (Little Rock, Arkansas), listed on the NRHP in Arkansas
- South Main Street Residential Historic District (Statesboro, Georgia), listed on the NRHP in Georgia

== See also ==
- South Main Street Historic District (disambiguation)
