= Main Avenue Historic District =

Main Avenue Historic District may refer to:

- Main Avenue Historic District (Durango, Colorado), listed on the NRHP in La Plata County, Colorado
- Main Avenue Historic District (De Pere, Wisconsin), listed on the NRHP in Brown County, Wisconsin
- North Main Avenue Historic District, Newton, North Carolina, listed on the NRHP in Catawba County, North Carolina

== See also ==
- Main Street Historic District (disambiguation)
