= Downtown Main Street Historic District =

Downtown Main Street Historic District may refer to:

- Downtown Main Street Historic District (East Hartford, Connecticut)
- Downtown Main Street Historic District (North Wilkesboro, North Carolina)

== See also ==
- Main Street Historic District (disambiguation)
