= North Main Street Historic District =

North Main Street Historic District may refer to:

- North Main Street Historic District (Tuskegee, Alabama), listed on the National Register of Historic Places (NRHP) in Macon County
- Monticello North Main Street Historic District, Monticello, Arkansas, listed on the NRHP in Drew County
- North Main Street Historic District (Kennesaw, Georgia), listed on the NRHP in Cobb County
- North Main Street Commercial Historic District (Statesboro, Georgia), listed on the NRHP in Bulloch County
- Central Park-North Main Street Historic District, Charles City, Iowa, listed on the NRHP in Floyd County
- North Main Street Historic District (Greenville, Kentucky), listed on the NRHP in Muhlenberg County
- North Main Street Historic District (Henderson, Kentucky), listed on the NRHP in Henderson County
- North Main Street Historic District (Harrodsburg, Kentucky), listed on the NRHP in Mercer County
- North Main Street Historic District (Madisonville, Kentucky), listed on the NRHP in Hopkins County
- North Main-North Adams Historic District, Owenton, Kentucky, listed on the NRHP in Owen County
- North Main Street Historic District (Somerset, Kentucky), listed on the NRHP in Pulaski County
- North Main Street Historic District (Hattiesburg, Mississippi), listed on the NRHP in Forrest County
- North Main Street Historic District (Hannibal, Missouri), listed on the NRHP in Marion County
- North Main Street Historic District (Poplar Bluff, Missouri), listed on the NRHP in Butler County
- North Main-Bank Streets Historic District, Albion, New York, listed on the NRHP in Orleans County
- North Main Street Historic District (Canandaigua, New York), listed on the NRHP in Ontario County
- North Main Street Historic District (East Hampton, New York), listed on the NRHP in Suffolk County
- North Main Street Historic District (Moravia, New York), listed on the NRHP in Cayuga County
- North Main Street Historic District (Southampton, New York), listed on the NRHP in Suffolk County
- North Main Street Historic District (Graham, North Carolina), listed on the NRHP in Alamance County
- North Main Street Historic District (Mocksville, North Carolina), listed on the NRHP in Davie County
- North Main Street Historic District (Salisbury, North Carolina), listed on the NRHP in Rowan County
- North Main-North Detroit Street Historic District, Kenton, Ohio, listed on the NRHP in Hardin County
- North Main-North Gay Streets Historic District, Mount Vernon, Ohio, listed on the NRHP in Knox County
- Laverne's North Main Street District, Laverne, Oklahoma, listed on the NRHP in Harper County
- North Main Street Historic District (Bolivar, Tennessee), listed on the NRHP in Hardeman County
- Pinch-North Main Commercial District, Memphis, Tennessee, listed on the NRHP in Shelby County
- North Main Street Historic District (Mount Pleasant, Tennessee), listed on the NRHP in Maury County
- North Main Street Historic District (Fond du Lac, Wisconsin), listed on the NRHP in Fond du Lac County
- North Main Street Historic District (Janesville, Wisconsin), listed on the NRHP in Rock County
- North Main Street Historic District (Oshkosh, Wisconsin), listed on the NRHP in Winnebago County

== See also ==
- North Main Street (disambiguation)
- North Main Avenue Historic District, Newton, North Carolina
- Main Street Historic District (disambiguation)
- South Main Street Historic District (disambiguation)
- East Main Street Historic District (disambiguation)
- West Main Street Historic District (disambiguation)
