= North Main Street =

North Main Street may refer to

- North Main Street (Cork)
- North Main Street Historic District (disambiguation), multiple locations with this name

== See also ==
- Main Street (disambiguation)
