= South Main Street Commercial Historic District =

South Main Street Commercial Historic District may refer to:

- South Main Street Commercial Historic District (Little Rock, Arkansas)
- South Main Street Commercial Historic District (Pendleton, Oregon), listed on the National Register of Historic Places

== See also ==
- South Main Street Historic District (disambiguation)
