= South Main Street District =

South Main Street District may refer to:

- South Main Street District (Middletown, Ohio)
- South Main Street District (Poland, Ohio), listed on the National Register of Historic Places

== See also ==
- South Main Street Historic District (disambiguation)
