= Upper Main Street Historic District =

Upper Main Street Historic District may refer to:

- Upper Main Street Historic District (Ansonia, Connecticut)
- Upper Main Street Historic District (Lafayette, Indiana)
- Upper Main Street Historic District (Dubuque, Iowa)
- Upper Main Street Historic District (Hatfield, Massachusetts)
- Upper Main Street Historic District (Menasha, Wisconsin), listed on the National Register of Historic Places in Winnebago County, Wisconsin

== See also ==
- Main Street Historic District (disambiguation)
