= Madison Station Historic District =

Historic district in Alabama, United States

- U.S. National Register of Historic Places
- U.S. Historic district
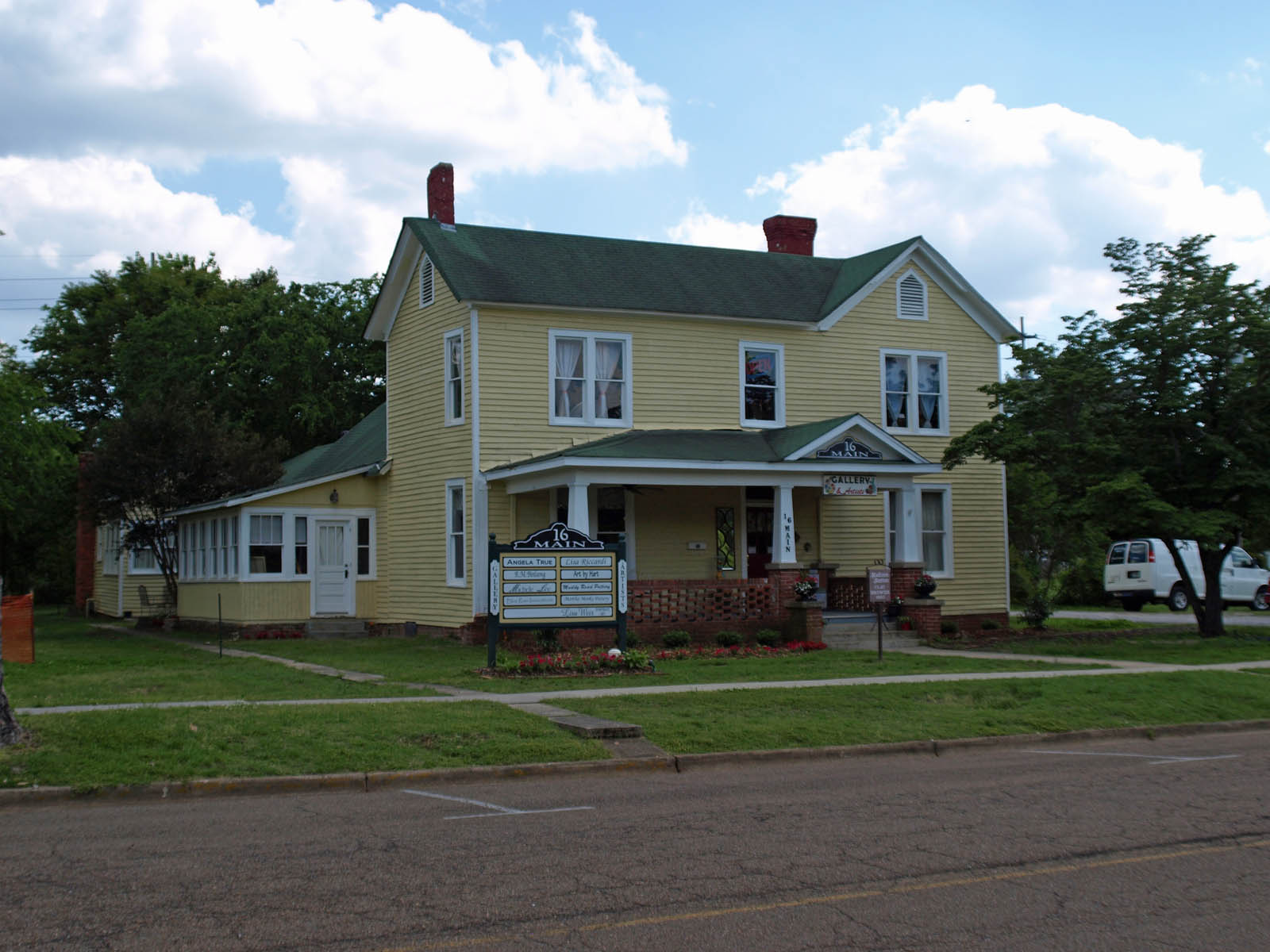
- The Clay House Museum, built in 1858

- Location within Alabama Location within the United States
- Location: Roughly bounded by Wall Triana Hwy., Mill Rd., Church St., Maple St., Martin St., and Bradley St., Madison, Alabama
- Coordinates: 34°41′46″N 86°44′51″W
- Area: 129 acres (52 ha)
- Architectural style: Queen Anne, Bungalow/Craftsman
- NRHP reference No.: 06000185
- Added to NRHP: March 29, 2006

The Madison Station Historic District is a historic district in Madison, Alabama. Madison was first settled around 1818 as a farming community, but significant growth began in 1858, when the first depot was built along the Memphis and Charleston Railroad line. Madison Station became an important loading point for the shipment of cotton, supplanting the Tennessee River as the preferred means of shipment. Merchants and other businesses soon followed, with many people moving from the river port of Triana. After a lull during the Civil War, the town's growth continued; Madison was incorporated in 1869. The town grew steadily until the 1950s, when industry spurred by the expansion of Redstone Arsenal replaced cotton as the primary economic force in Madison County.

The historic district contains the commercial strip along Main Street, running along the railroad tracks; cotton warehouses a few blocks from the depot; and numerous houses from the late 19th and early 20th centuries, mostly to the north of the tracks. The commercial buildings are grouped in two blocks on the eastern end of main street. Most date from after 1900, with the exception of the Robert P. Cain Mercantile store (built 1859) and the building that housed Madison's first drug store (built 1871). The houses in the district represent popular styles of the late 1800s and early 1900s, including Queen Anne, Folk Victorian, Colonial Revival, Tudor Revival, and American Craftsman. The oldest houses are on Front Street, paralleling the tracks on the north, most of which are in Queen Anne style. The majority of houses are on Church Street, and show the full range of architectural styles. Between Front Street and the railroad tracks is the Village Green, a public, open space that contains a gazebo and a replica of the Roundhouse, the first town hall. The Madison Station depot was housed in four buildings during its existence: the first, built in 1858, was destroyed in a Civil War battle in 1864; the second served from 1866 until 1885; the third from 1885 until 1901; and the final, a combined passenger and freight depot, closed in 1961 and has since been demolished.

The district was listed on the National Register of Historic Places in 2006.
