= East Main Street Commercial Historic District (Statesboro, Georgia) =

Historic district in Georgia, United States

Coordinates: 32.44889°N 81.78219°W

- U.S. National Register of Historic Places
- U.S. Historic district
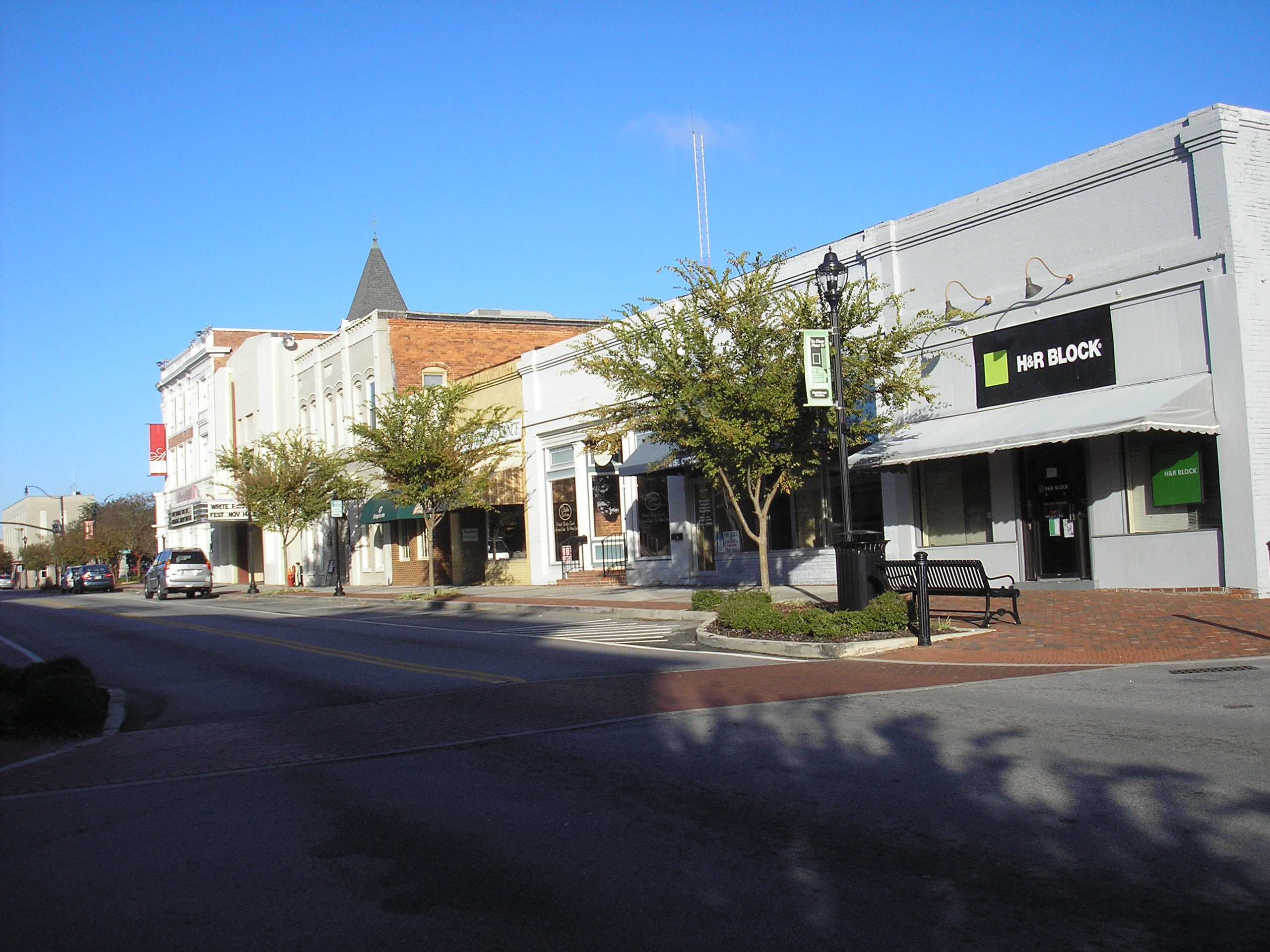
- North side of street, in 2014

- Location within Georgia Location within the United States
- Location: Roughly E. Main St./US 301 between Siebald and Oak Sts., Statesboro, Georgia
- Area: 1.5 acres (0.61 ha)
- Architect: Multiple
- Architectural style: Moderne, Beaux Arts, Italianate
- MPS: Downtown Statesboro MPS
- NRHP reference No.: 89001155
- Added to NRHP: September 6, 1989

The East Main Street Commercial Historic District in Statesboro, Georgia, is a historic district that was listed on the National Register of Historic Places in 1989. At the time, it included 16 contributing buildings: all eight buildings comprising the north side of East Main Street on the block from Siebold Street to Oak Street (including, from west to east, the Bank of Statesboro then from number 31 to number 47), and eight buildings on the south side of that block, from Oak Street returning to an alley before Siebold Street is reached (including numbers 46 to 32).

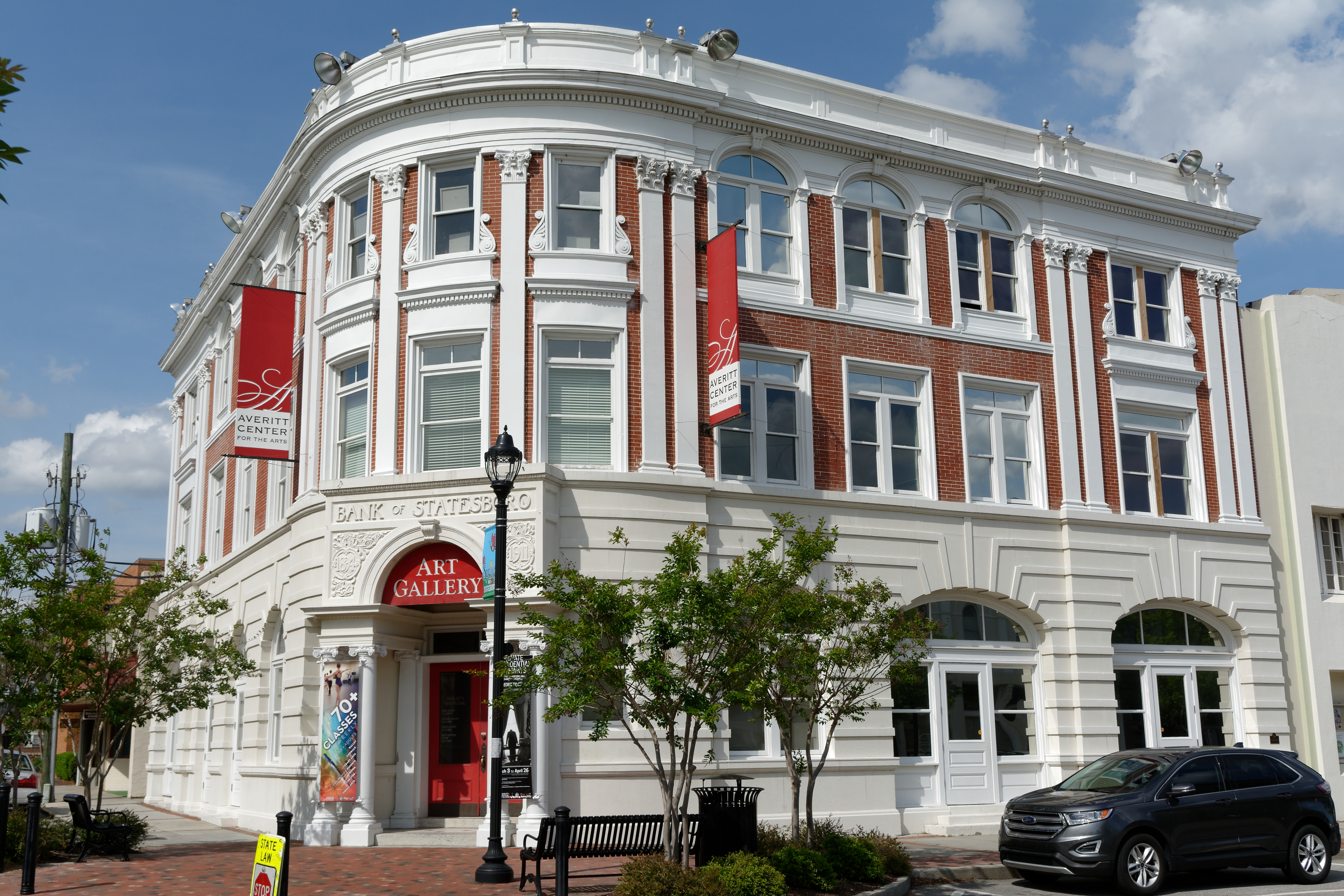
Bank of Statesboro in 2017

The three-story Beaux Arts-style Bank of Statesboro building at East Main and Siebold is one of two "outstanding" buildings in the district (it is now an art gallery). It has Ionic columns at its main entrance and Corinthian pilasters on its second and third floors. The other is the Art Moderne Georgia Theatre (1936) (now named the Emma Kelly Theater).

Statesboro was the subject of a wider survey of historic resources completed at the same time as the NRHP nomination for the district.
