= Main Street Historic District (Buffalo, Wyoming) =

Historic district in Wyoming, United States

- U.S. National Register of Historic Places
- U.S. Historic district
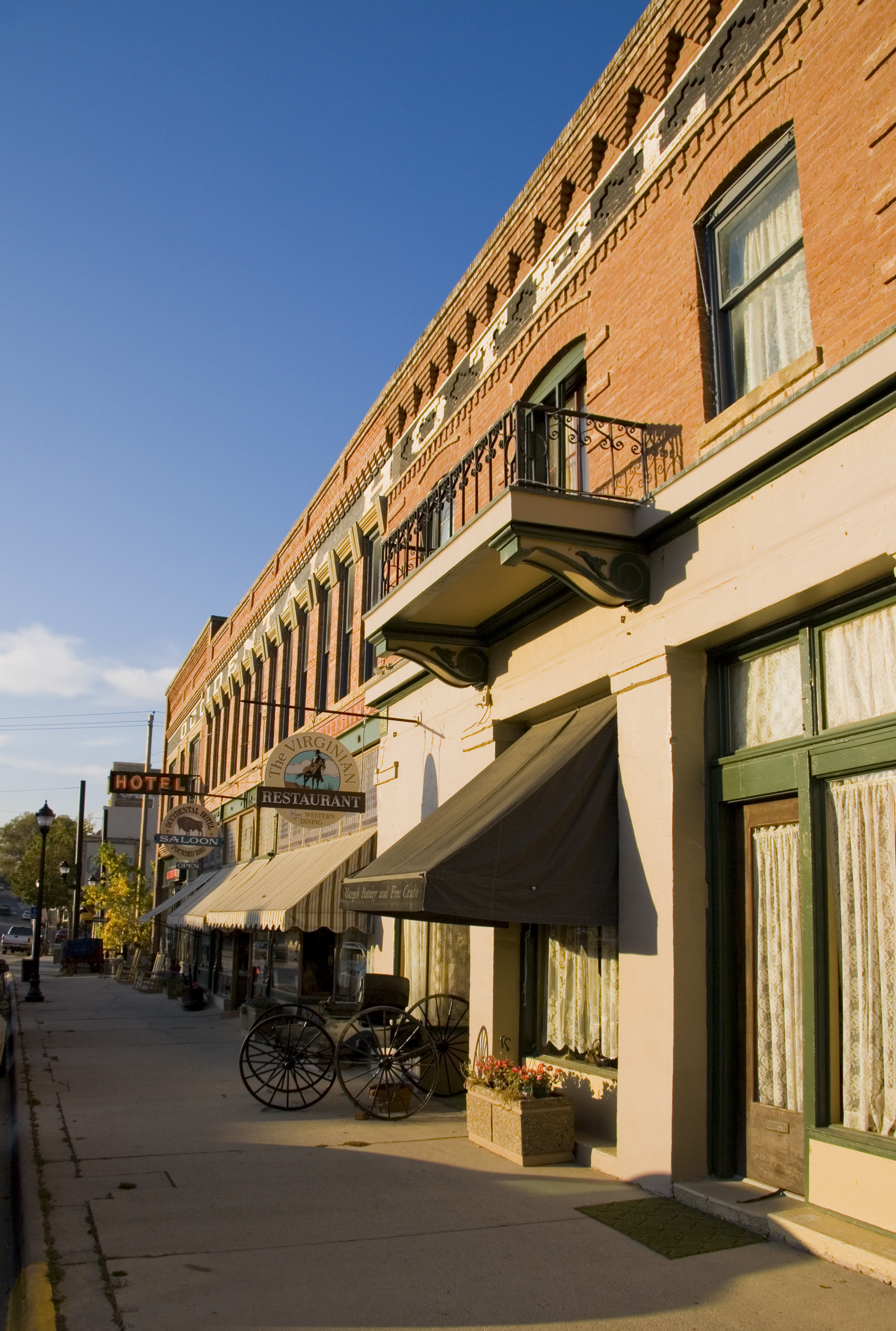

- Location within Wyoming Location within the United States
- Location: Main St., Buffalo, Wyoming
- Coordinates: 44°20′48″N 106°41′53″W
- Area: 5 acres (2.0 ha)
- NRHP reference No.: 84003676
- Added to NRHP: April 12, 1984

The Main Street Historic District of Buffalo, Wyoming, also known as Buffalo Main Street Historic District, is a 5-acre (2.0 ha) historic district that was listed on the National Register of Historic Places in 1984. The district included 12 contributing buildings.

According to its NRHP nomination, the district is "associated with and representative of the chain of events removal of Indian control, homesteading, cattle ranching and agricultural development, foreign investments, the tourist industry and mineral development which have made significant contributions to the broad patterns of Johnson County and Wyoming history."
