= Main Street Historic District (Millerton, New York) =

Historic district in New York, United States

- U.S. National Register of Historic Places
- U.S. Historic district
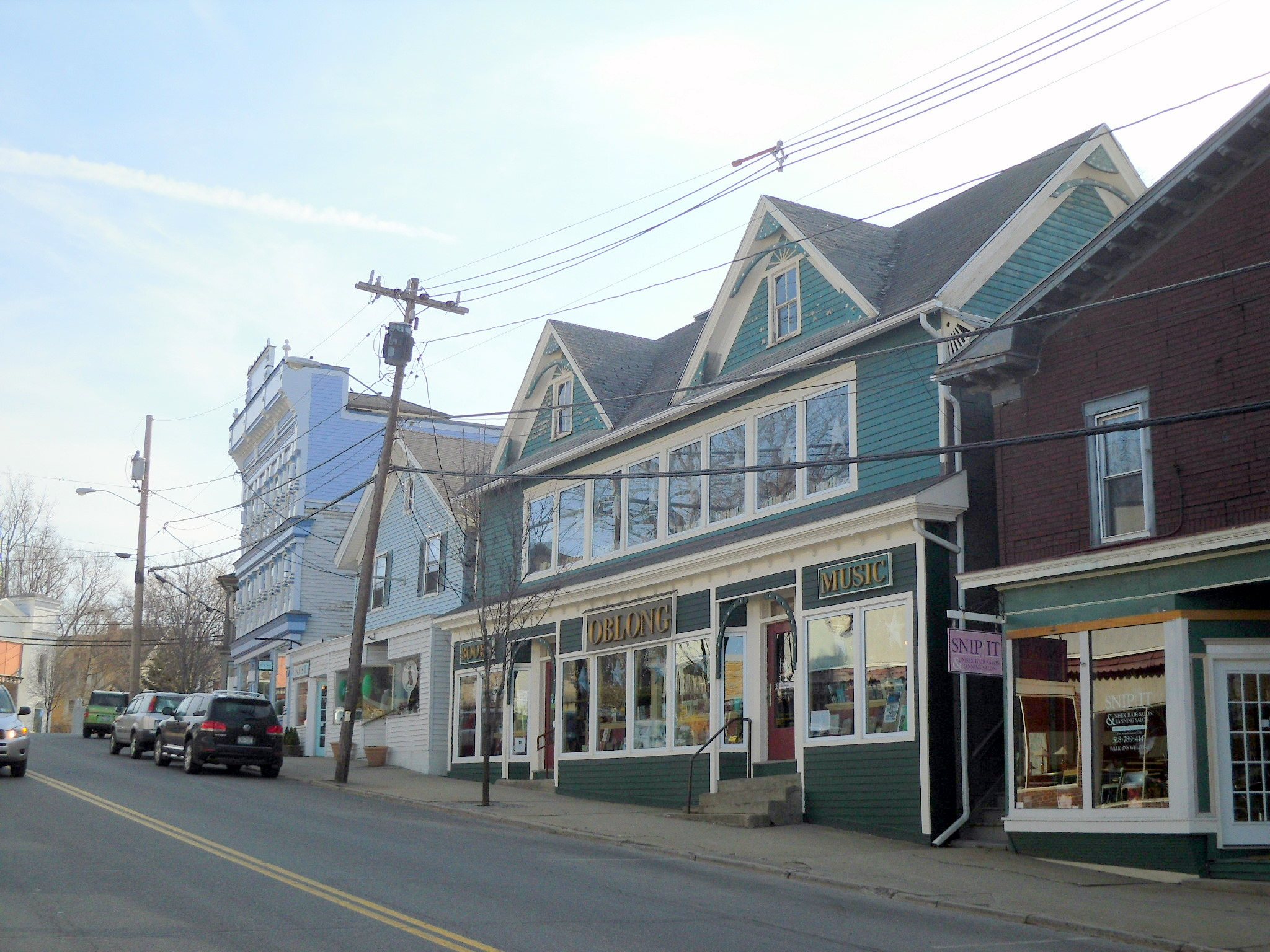
- Main Street Historic District, March 2010

- Location within New York Location within the United States
- Location: Main St., North, South Center St. and John St.; Dutchess Ave., Park Ave., South Maple Ave and Elm Ave., Millerton, New York
- Coordinates: 41°57′13.33″N 73°30′38.44″W
- Area: 26.58 acres (10.76 ha)
- NRHP reference No.: 09001284
- Added to NRHP: January 27, 2010

Main Street Historic District is a federally recognized historic district located at Millerton in Dutchess County, New York. It includes 65 contributing buildings, seven contributing sites, and one contributing structure. It encompasses the historic commercial core of the village.

It was added to the National Register of Historic Places in 2010.
