= Main Street Historic District (Newberry, South Carolina) =

Historic district in South Carolina, United States

- U.S. National Register of Historic Places
- U.S. Historic district
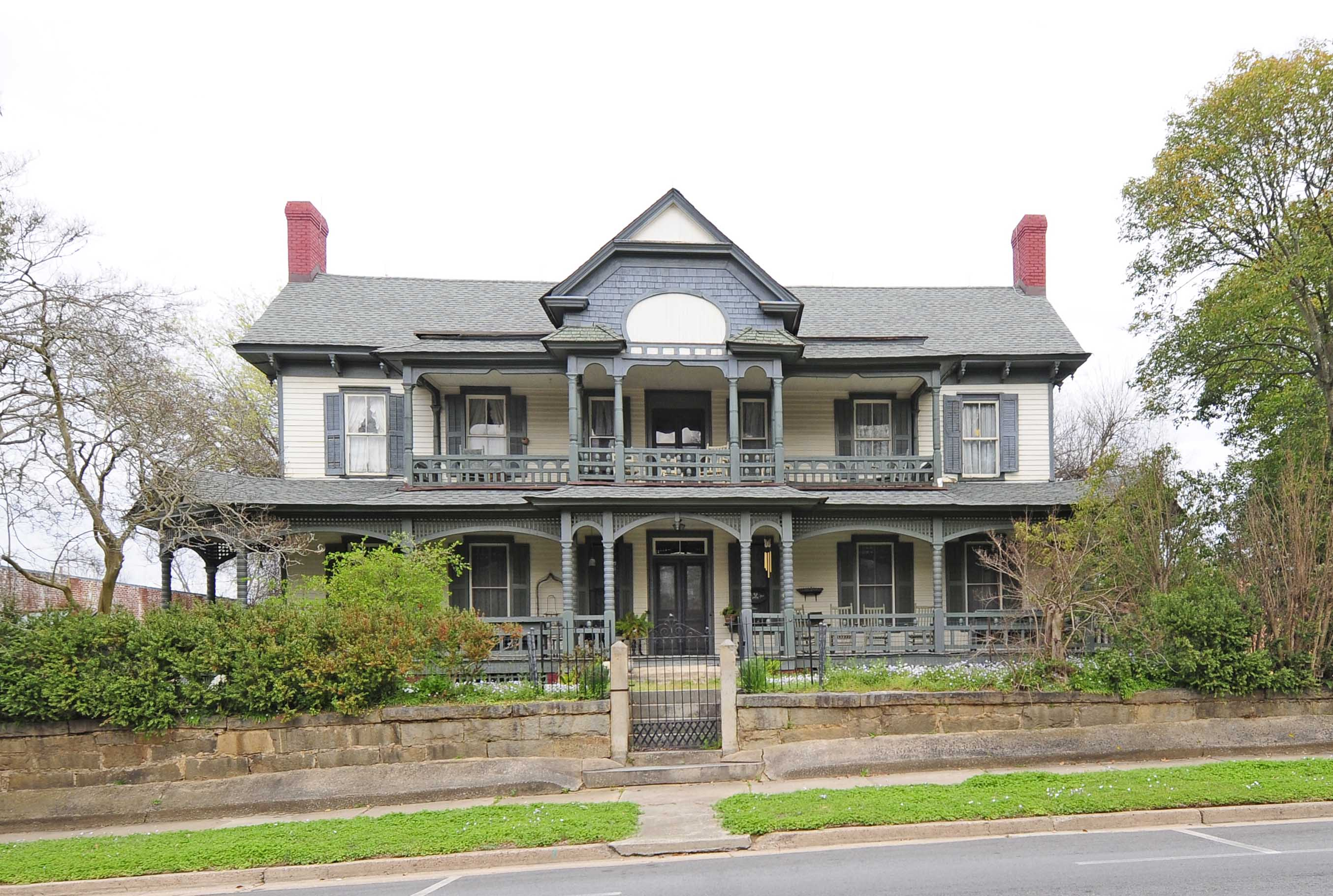
- House in the Main Street Historic District, March 2012

- Location within South Carolina Location within the United States
- Location: Roughly bounded by Harper, Summer, Douglas, Johnstone, Holman, and McMorris Sts., Newberry, South Carolina
- Coordinates: 34°16′47″N 81°36′40″W
- Area: 46.7 acres (18.9 ha)
- Built: 1830
- Built by: C. C. Davis, Frank P. Milburn
- Architectural style: Classical Revival, Greek Revival, Italianate
- MPS: Newberry MRA
- NRHP reference No.: 80004463
- Added to NRHP: November 26, 1980

Main Street Historic District is a national historic district located at Newberry, Newberry County, South Carolina. The district encompasses 51 contributing buildings in an upper-class neighborhood of Newberry. The district includes residences dating from about 1840 to 1950. They include notable examples of the Italianate, Greek Revival, Neoclassical styles. Also located in the district is the St. Luke's Episcopal Church and the Newberry Associate Reformed Presbyterian Church.

It was listed on the National Register of Historic Places in 1980.
