= East Main Street Historic District (Danville, Kentucky) =

Historic district in Kentucky, United States

- U.S. National Register of Historic Places
- U.S. Historic district
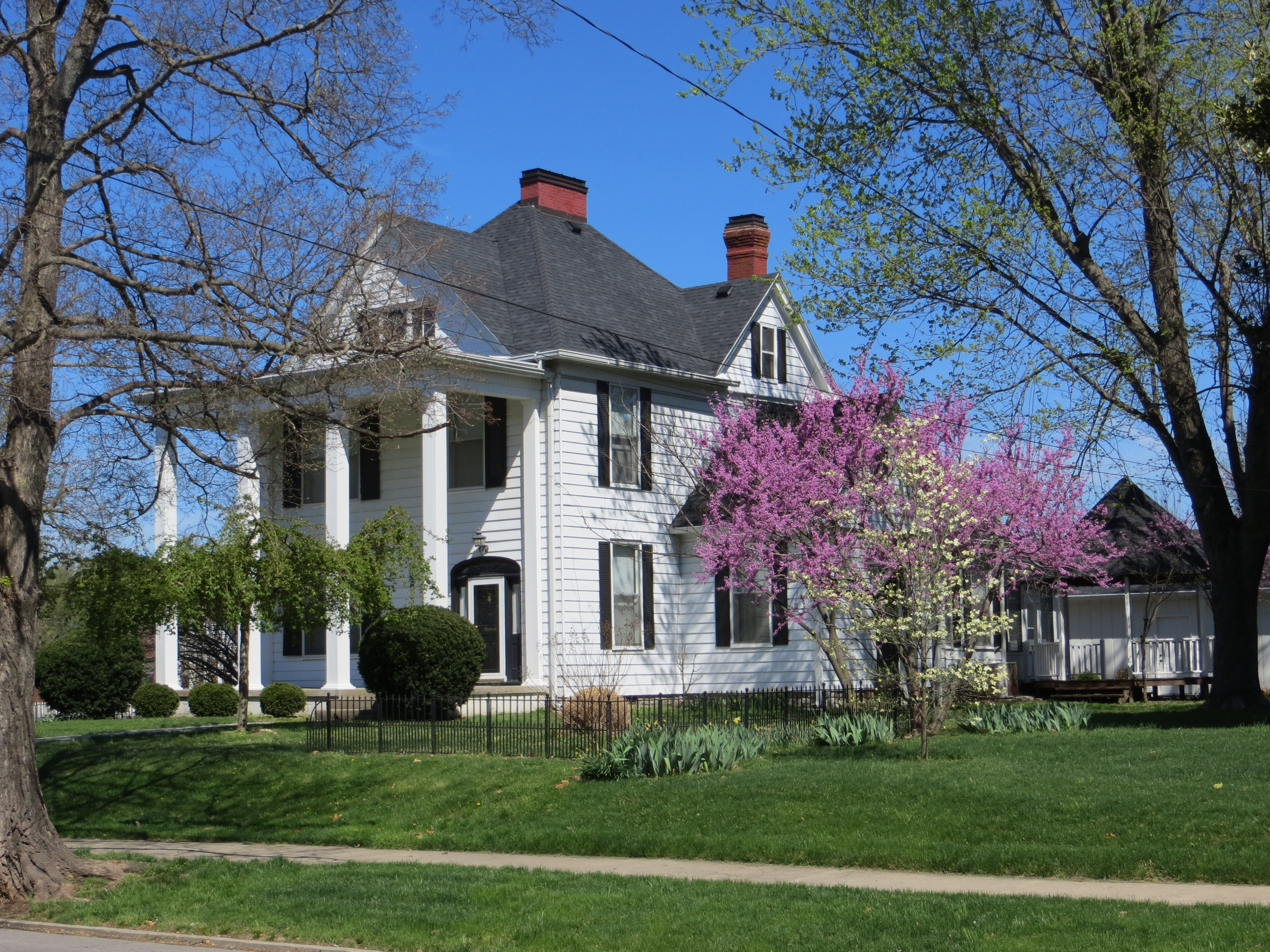

- Location within Kentucky Location within the United States
- Location: 419-619 E. Main St., Danville, Kentucky
- Coordinates: 37°38′42″N 84°45′42″W
- Built: 1890-1930
- Architectural style: Classical Revival, Queen Anne, American foursquare
- MPS: Danville MRA
- NRHP reference No.: 86000640
- Added to NRHP: March 31, 1986

East Main Street Historic District in Danville, Kentucky is a historic district that was listed on the National Register of Historic Places in 1986.

The district includes part or all of an area originally called "Otter's Addition". The Reid House is one example of Queen Anne architecture in the district, which was supported by the completion of the Danville railway which then facilitated use of pre-cut architectural woodwork details in construction in the area.

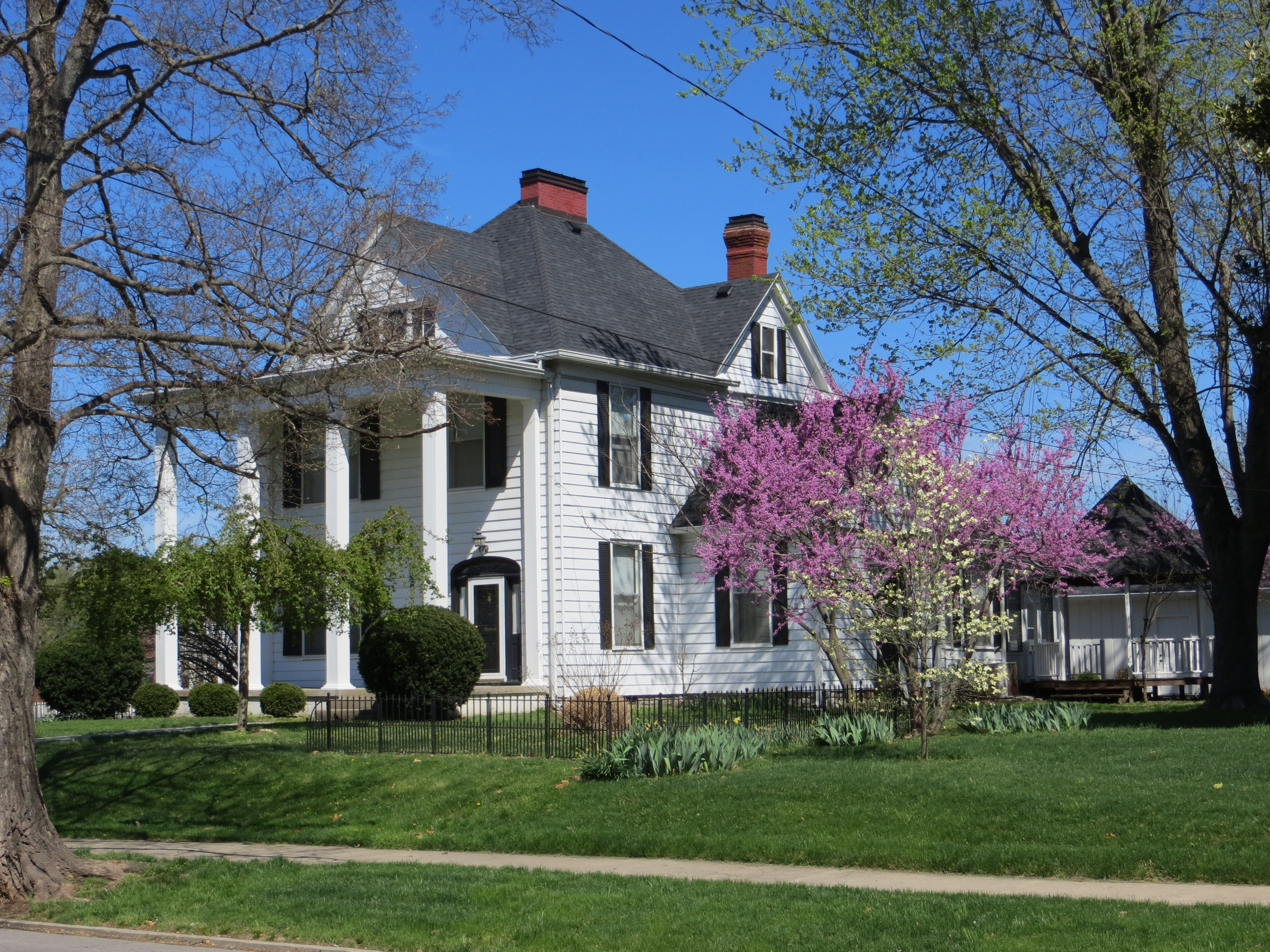
Colonial/Classical Revival house

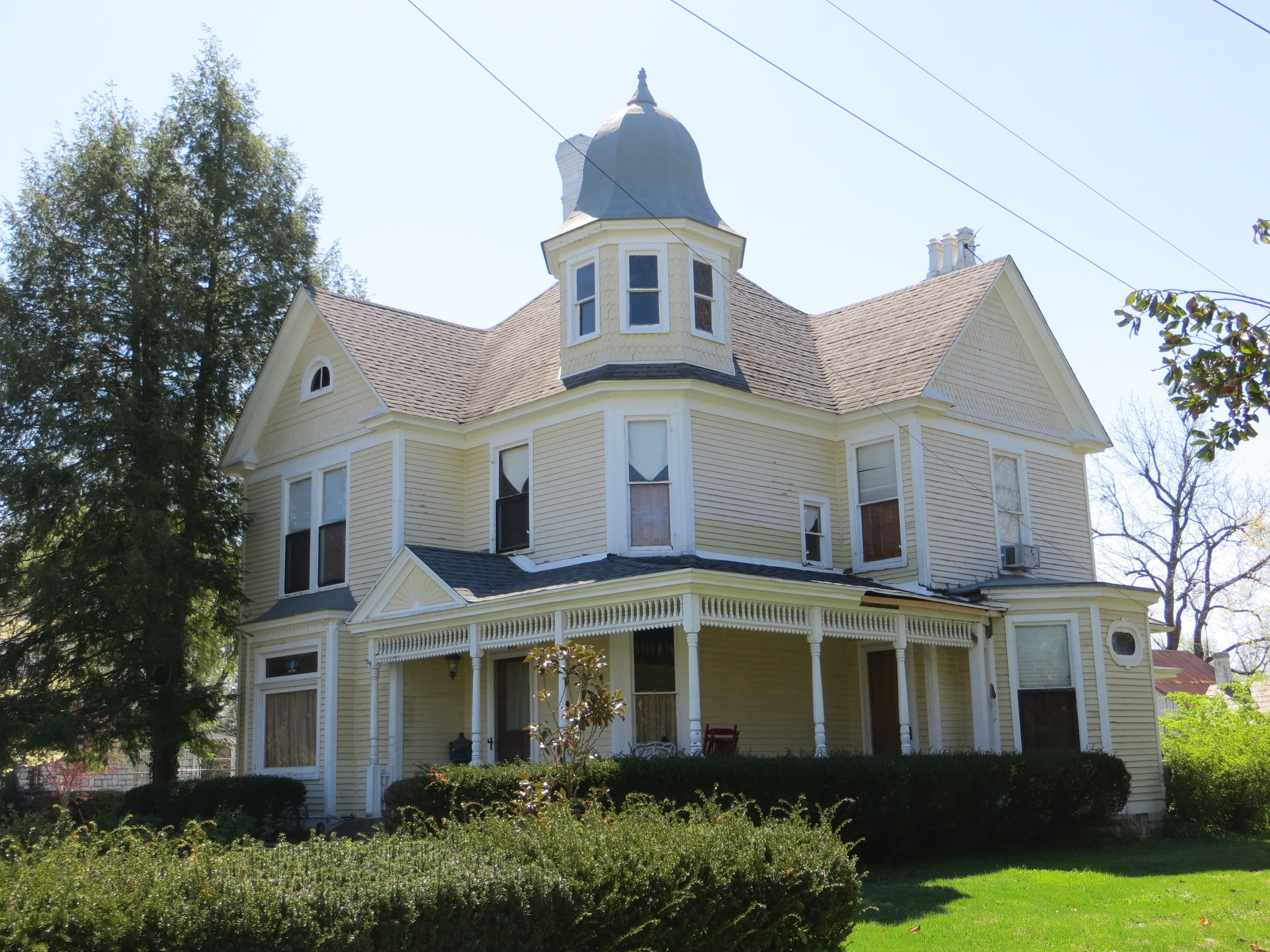
Queen Anne style house with cupola

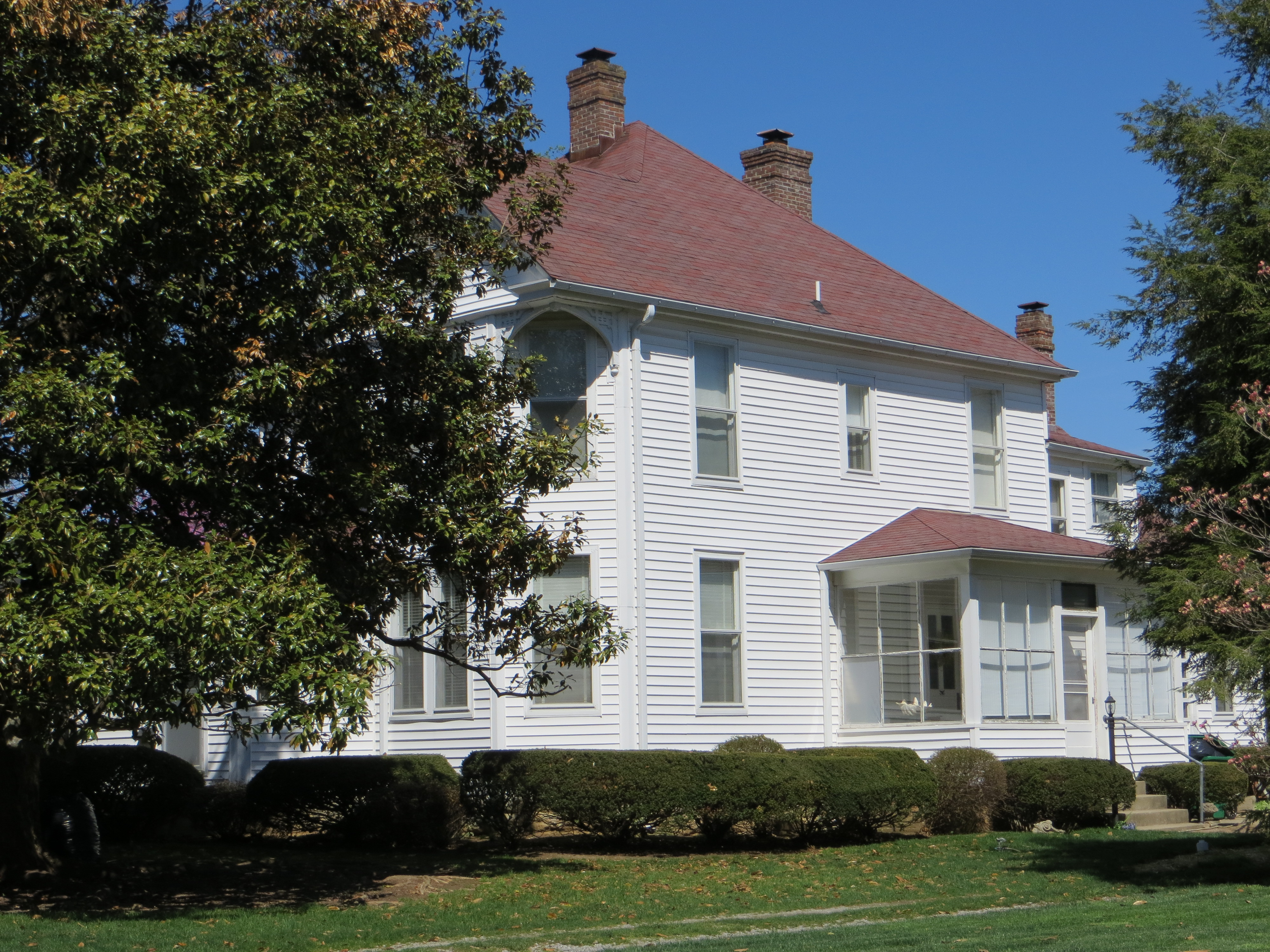
American foursquare house with sun porch

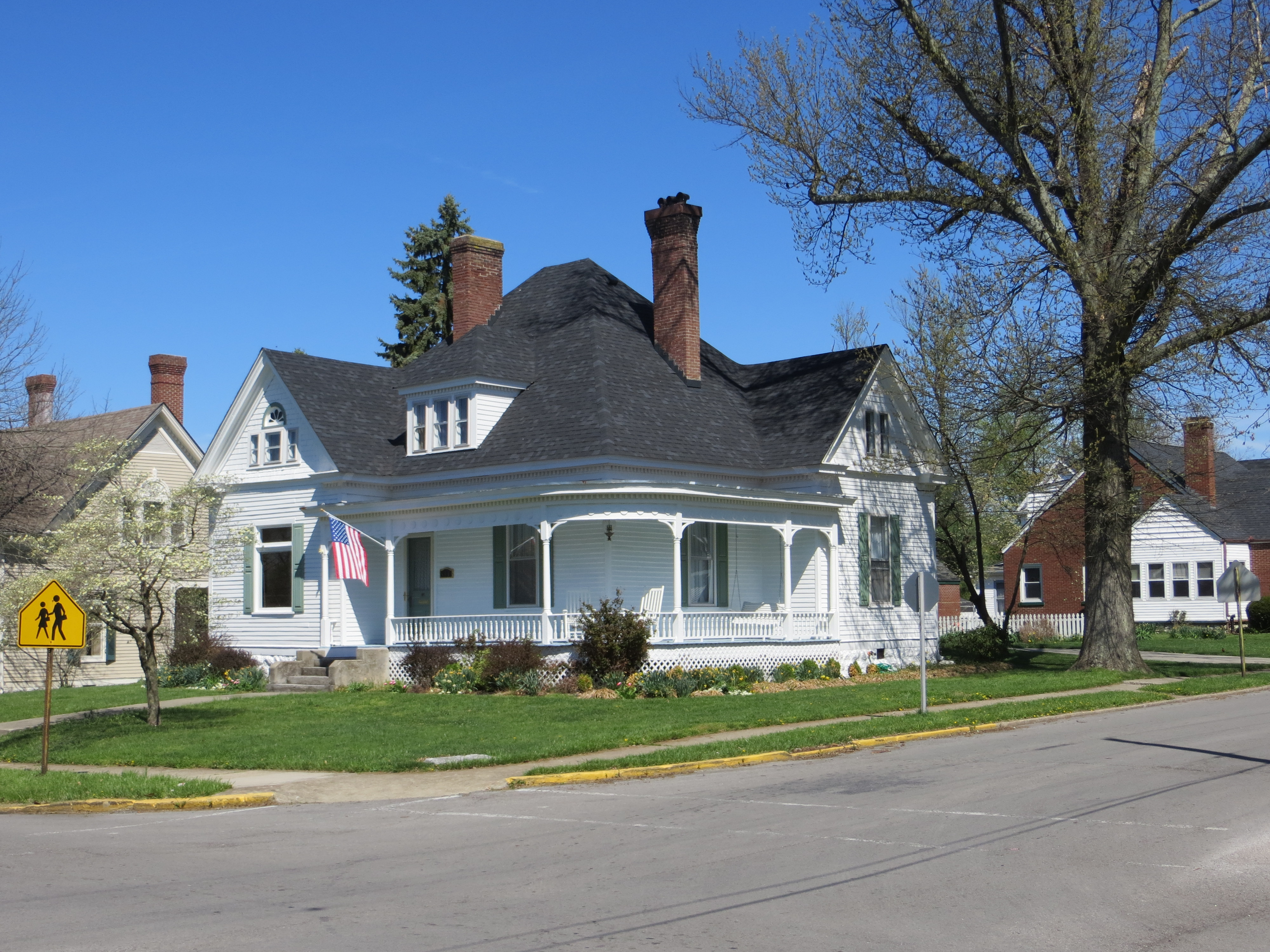
Queen Anne/bungalow style house

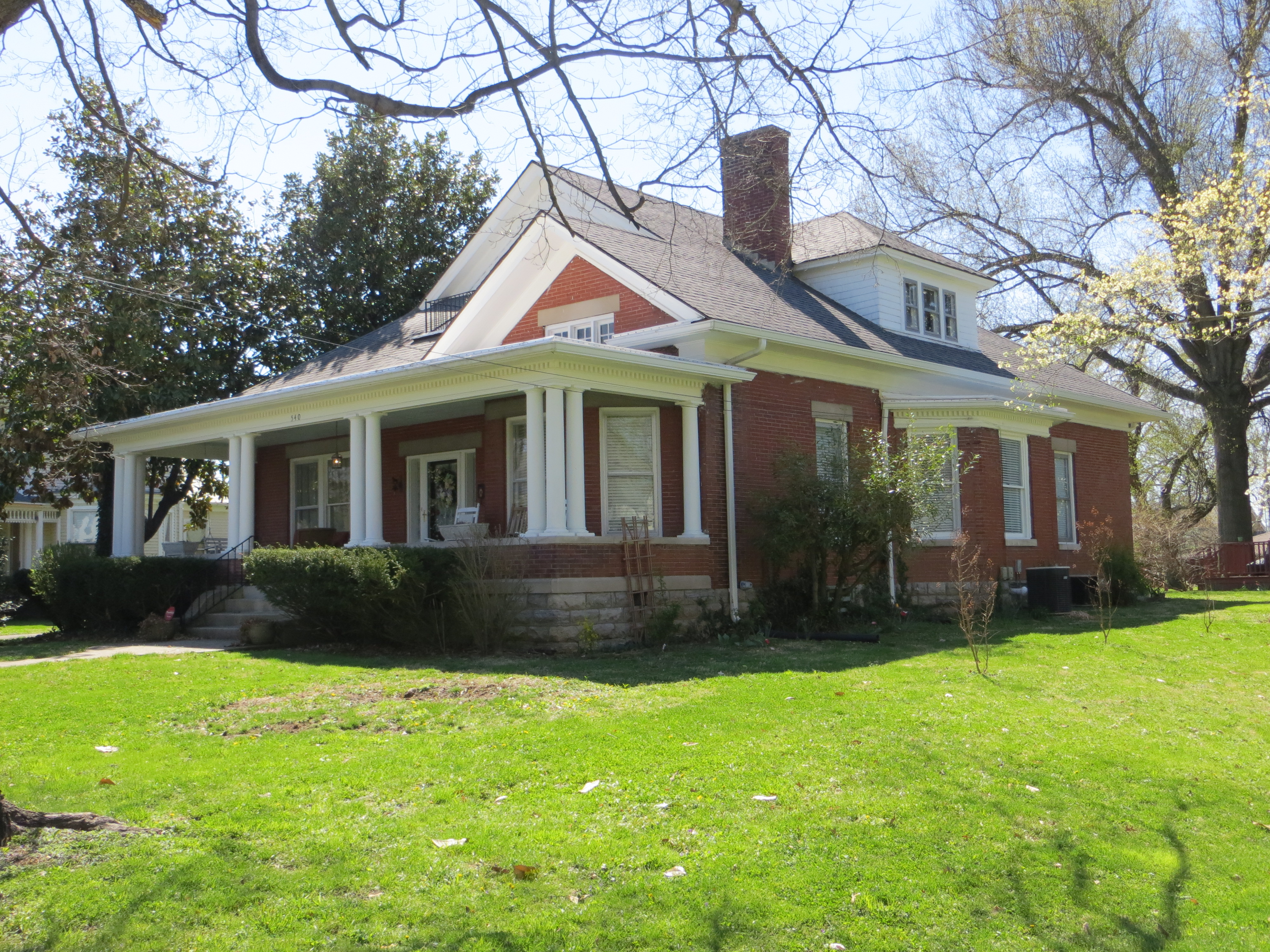
Brick house

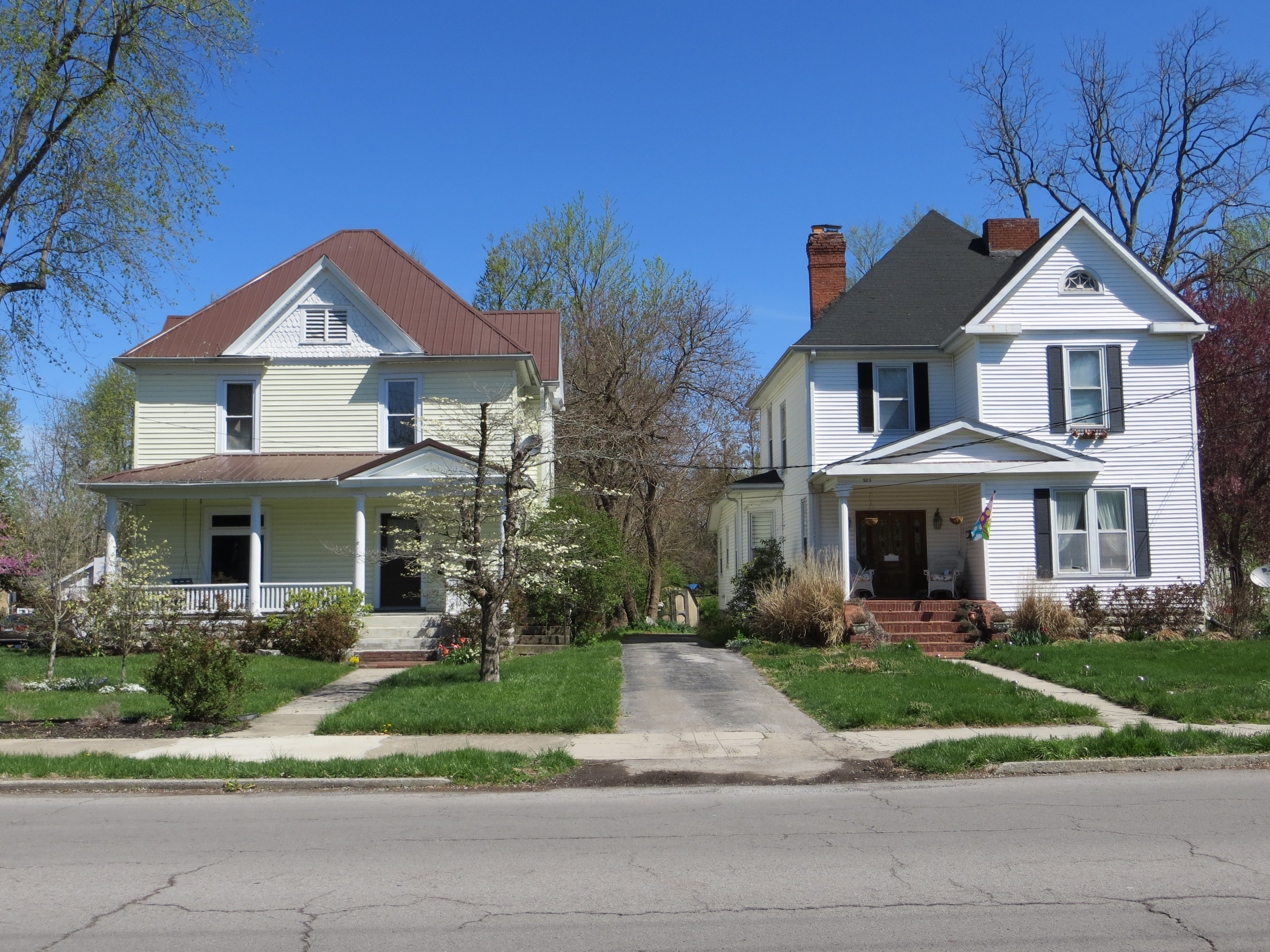
American foursquare house and neighbor
