= Main Street Historic District (Whitewater, Wisconsin) =

Historic district in Wisconsin, United States

- U.S. National Register of Historic Places
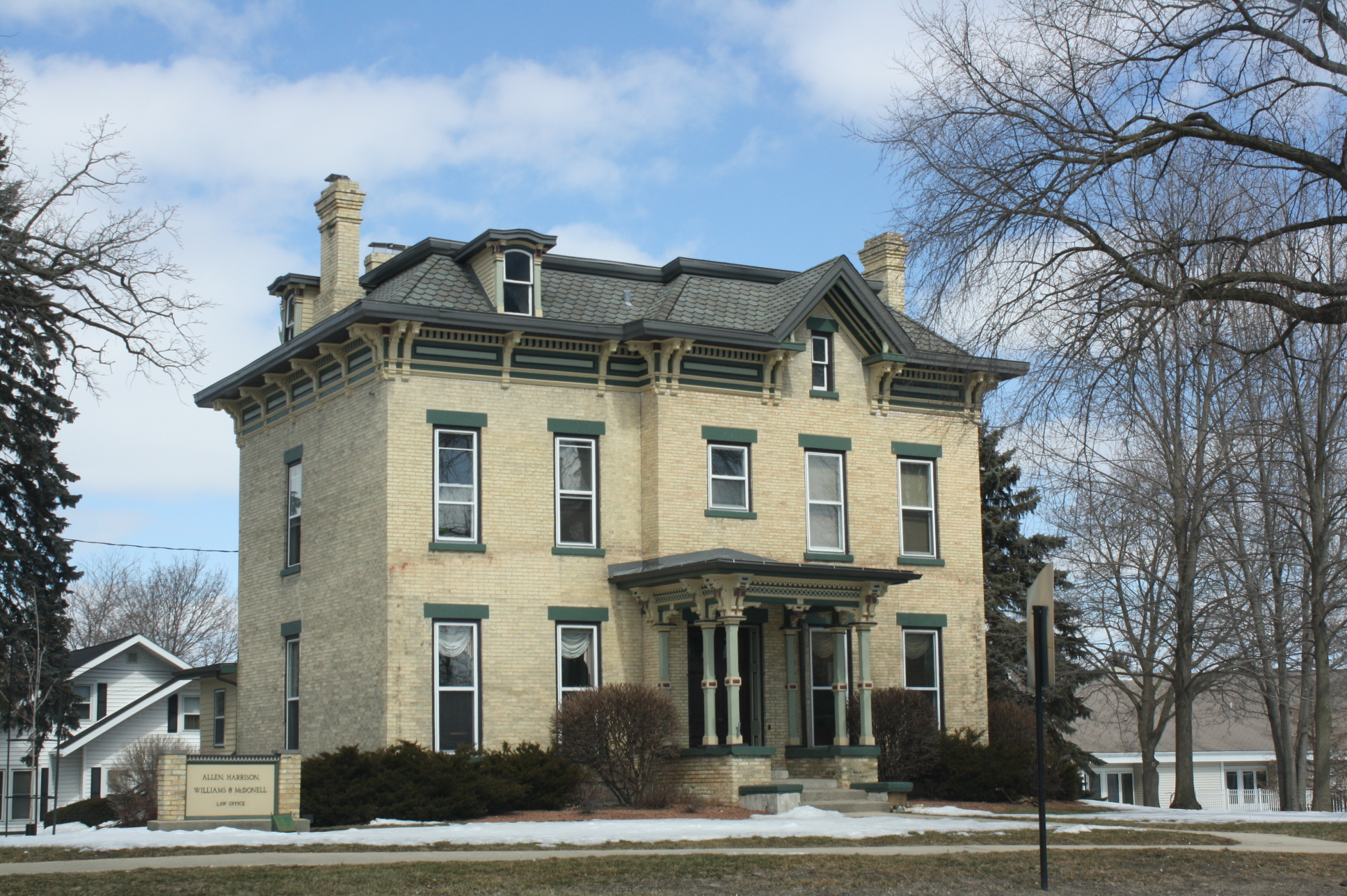
- A law office located in the district.
- Location: Roughly W. Main St./US 12 from Prairie St. to Fremont St. and Church St. from Forest Ave. to W. Main St., Whitewater, Wisconsin
- Area: 23 acres (9.3 ha)
- NRHP reference No.: 89002116
- Added to NRHP: December 21, 1989

The Main Street Historic District is located in Whitewater, Wisconsin.

== Description ==
The district is made up of a prestigious residential neighborhood between the central downtown and the UW, including the c.1847 Gothic Revival O'Connor house, the 1856 Italian Villa-style Smith-Allen house, the 1851/1878 Second Empire Kinney-Cox house, the 1882 Romanesque Revival First Congregational Church, the 1895 Queen Anne Engebretsen-Dorr house, the 1903 Birge fountain, and the 1904 Neoclassical White Memorial Library.
