= East Main Street Historic District (Waltham, Massachusetts) =

Historic district in Massachusetts, United States

- U.S. National Register of Historic Places
- U.S. Historic district
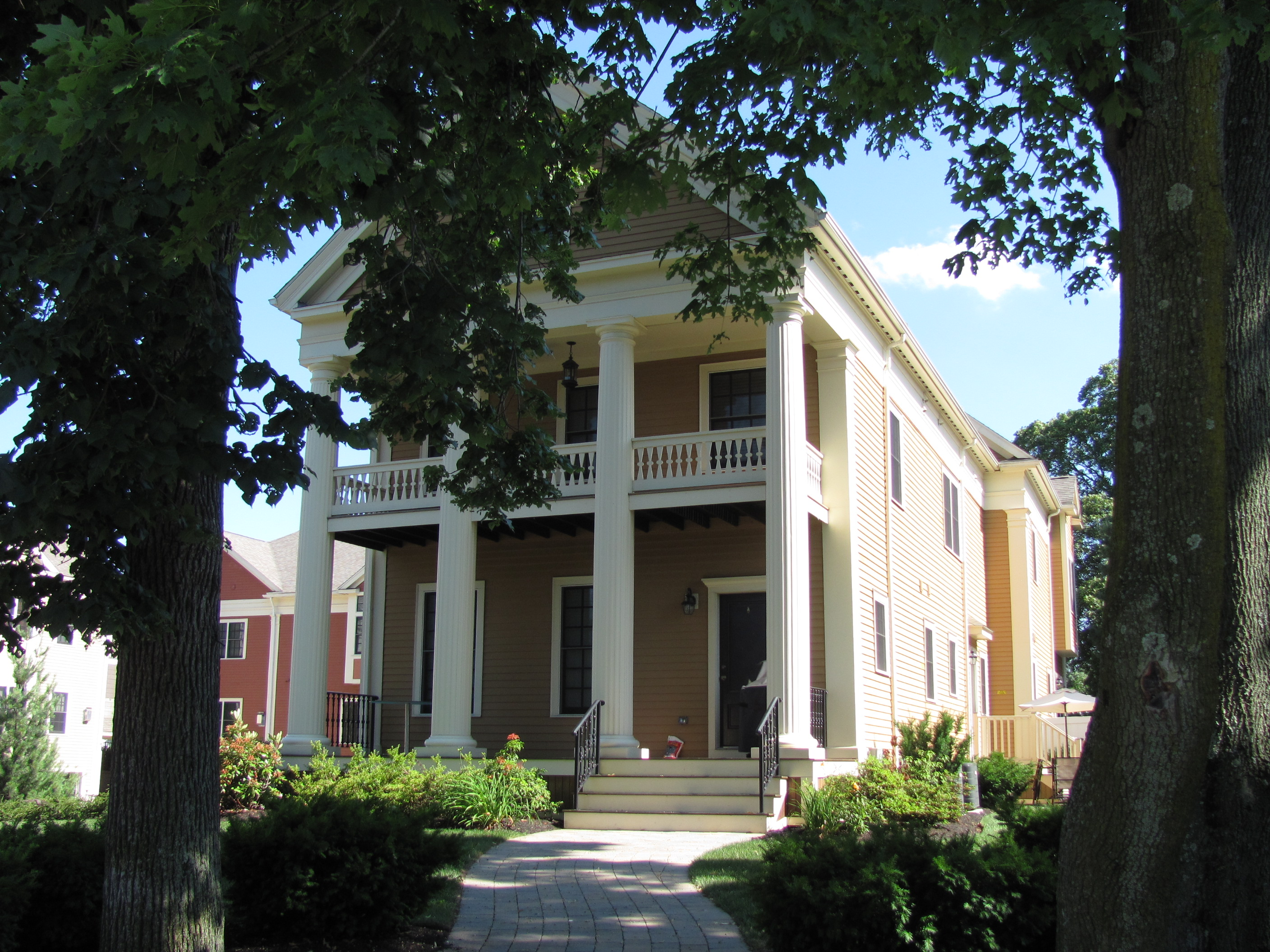
- House on East Main Street

- Location within Massachusetts Location within the United States
- Location: Roughly E. Main St. from Townsend St. to Chamberlain Ter., Waltham, Massachusetts
- Coordinates: 42°22′37″N 71°13′39″W
- Built: 1844
- Architectural style: Colonial Revival, Greek Revival, Italianate
- MPS: Waltham MRA
- NRHP reference No.: 89001498
- Added to NRHP: September 28, 1989

The East Main Street Historic District is a small residential historic district in Waltham, Massachusetts. It encompasses part of an area that was, before the 1813 construction of the Boston Manufacturing Company further west, developing as a center of the community. Because of the company's economic influence, the center was more fully developed further west, and East Main Street became a fashionable area for upper class housing. The four houses on the south side of East Main Street between Townsend Street and Chamberlain Terrace are a well-preserved remnant of this later period. The district was listed on the National Register of Historic Places in 1989.

The Lyman Reed House, at 436 Main Street, is the oldest of the four houses. Built in 1844, it is one of a few temple-front Greek Revival houses in the city. It has a full suite of high-style Greek Revival features, including pilastered corner boards, a full entablature, and full-length windows on the first floor of the main facade. The newest of the houses is the Charles P. Nutting House at 446 Main Street. Built c. 1900, it is a Colonial Revival structure with significant Queen Anne and Shingle style elements. Its gambrel roof sweeps down to the first floor, where it covers a veranda that extends across the front. The veranda has a fieldstone skirt and piers, with a round arch entry.

The other two houses are both Italianate in style. The Francis Blanchard House, at 428 Main Street, was built c. 1850-54, and has Greek Revival features, including a pedimented gable end facing the street and corner pilasters, but it also has a typically Italianate round-arch window in the gable. The George W. Chamberlain House at 418 Main Street (built about the same time) is more strongly Italianate, with a projecting gable roof that has paired brackets and a crowning belvedere. Greek Revival elements include flushboard siding and corner pilasters.

== See also ==
- National Register of Historic Places listings in Waltham, Massachusetts
