= East Main-High Street Historic District =

Historic district in Massachusetts, United States

- U.S. National Register of Historic Places
- U.S. Historic district
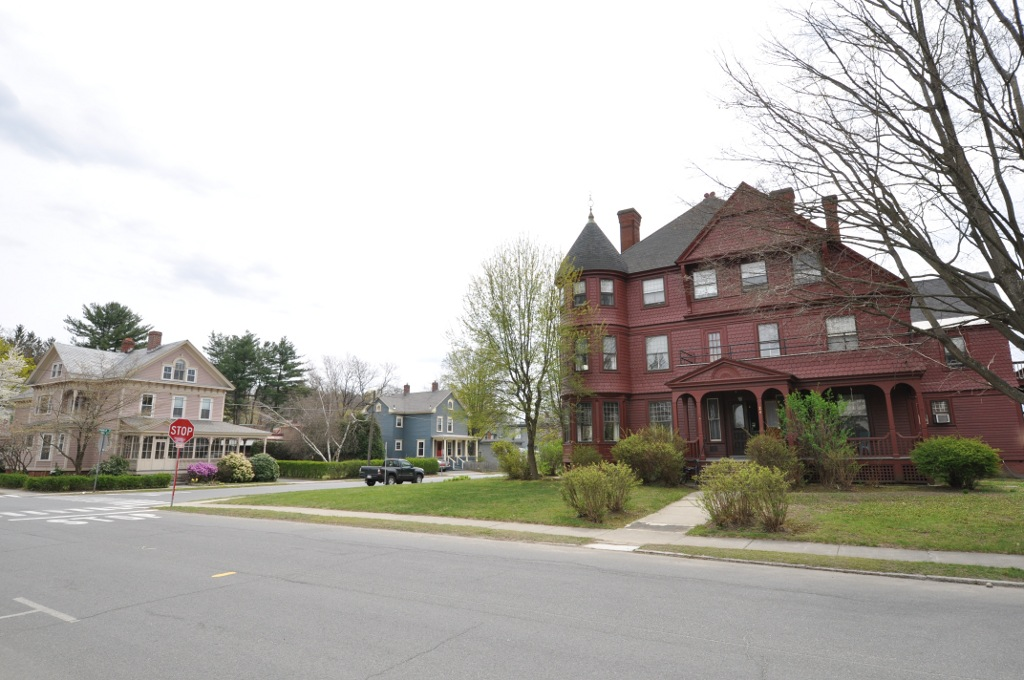

- Location within Massachusetts Location within the United States
- Location: Greenfield, Massachusetts
- Coordinates: 42°35′20″N 72°35′49″W
- Area: Franklink and Park Streets
- Built: 1902
- Architect: Benjamin, Asher; Et al.
- Architectural style: Mid 19th Century Revival, Late 19th And 20th Century Revivals, Late Victorian
- NRHP reference No.: 88002011
- Added to NRHP: March 16, 1989

The East Main–High Street Historic District is a historic district roughly bounded by Church, High, East Main and Franklin Streets in Greenfield, Massachusetts. It encompasses a predominantly residential area just east of Greenfield's central business district, historically where the town's wealthier residents lived, and features a wide variety of mainly 19th-century residential architecture. The district was listed on the National Register of Historic Places in 1989.

== Description and history ==
The city of Greenfield was settled as part of Deerfield in the 17th century, and was separately incorporated in 1753. It was reincorporated as a city in 2003. Due to its location near the confluence of the Deerfield and Connecticut Rivers, it developed in the 18th century as a regional center, and was named the shire town of Franklin County when it was established in 1813. The area east of its central business district was from the early 19th century a popular place for the well-to-do to live, a practice that continued through the 19th century.

The historic district consists of an area of roughly two square blocks, east of Federal Street (United States Route 5) and the commercial district of Main Street. It is bounded on the north by Church Street, the east by High Street, and the south by Main Street. Its western boundary is generally Franklin Street, although it extends westward nearly to Federal Street on Church Street. It has an area of about 33 acres (13 ha), and most of its architecture is residential, predominantly wood frame buildings of 1-1/2 to 2-1/2 stories. There are four churches. The buildings are architecturally diverse, with the Italianate one of the most common varieties found; many buildings exhibit multiple styles, owing to alterations made over time. The district's residents included the owners and management of major local businesses, as well as prominent lawyers and politicians.

== See also ==
- National Register of Historic Places listings in Franklin County, Massachusetts
