= Main Street Historic District (Cold Spring Harbor, New York) =

Historic district in New York, United States

- U.S. National Register of Historic Places
- U.S. Historic district
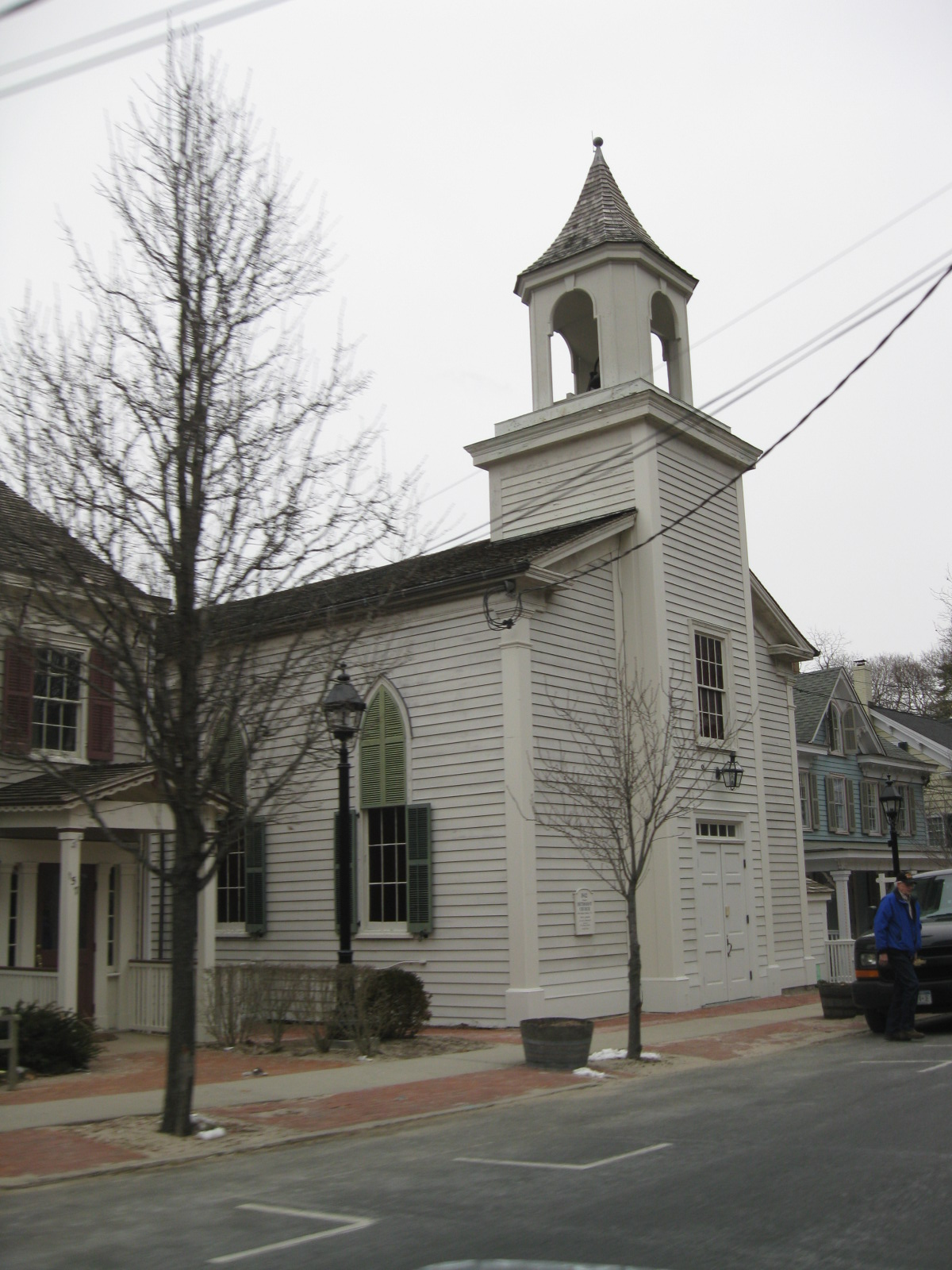
- Methodist Episcopal Church, February 2010

- Location within New York Location within the United States
- Location: Main St., Cold Spring Harbor, New York
- Coordinates: 40°52′18″N 73°27′21″W
- Area: 8 acres (3.2 ha)
- Architect: Brown & von Beren; Multiple
- Architectural style: Mid 19th Century Revival, Late Victorian, Federal
- MPS: Huntington Town MRA
- NRHP reference No.: 85002583
- Added to NRHP: September 26, 1985

Main Street Historic District is a national historic district located at Cold Spring Harbor in Suffolk County, New York. The district has 32 contributing buildings. The majority of the buildings were built between 1855 and 1890. It encompasses the village's historic core and charts its development from a major whaling port to a summer resort community.

It was added to the National Register of Historic Places in 1985.
