= East Main Street Historic District (Christiansburg, Virginia) =

Historic district in Virginia, United States

- U.S. National Register of Historic Places
- U.S. Historic district
- Virginia Landmarks Register
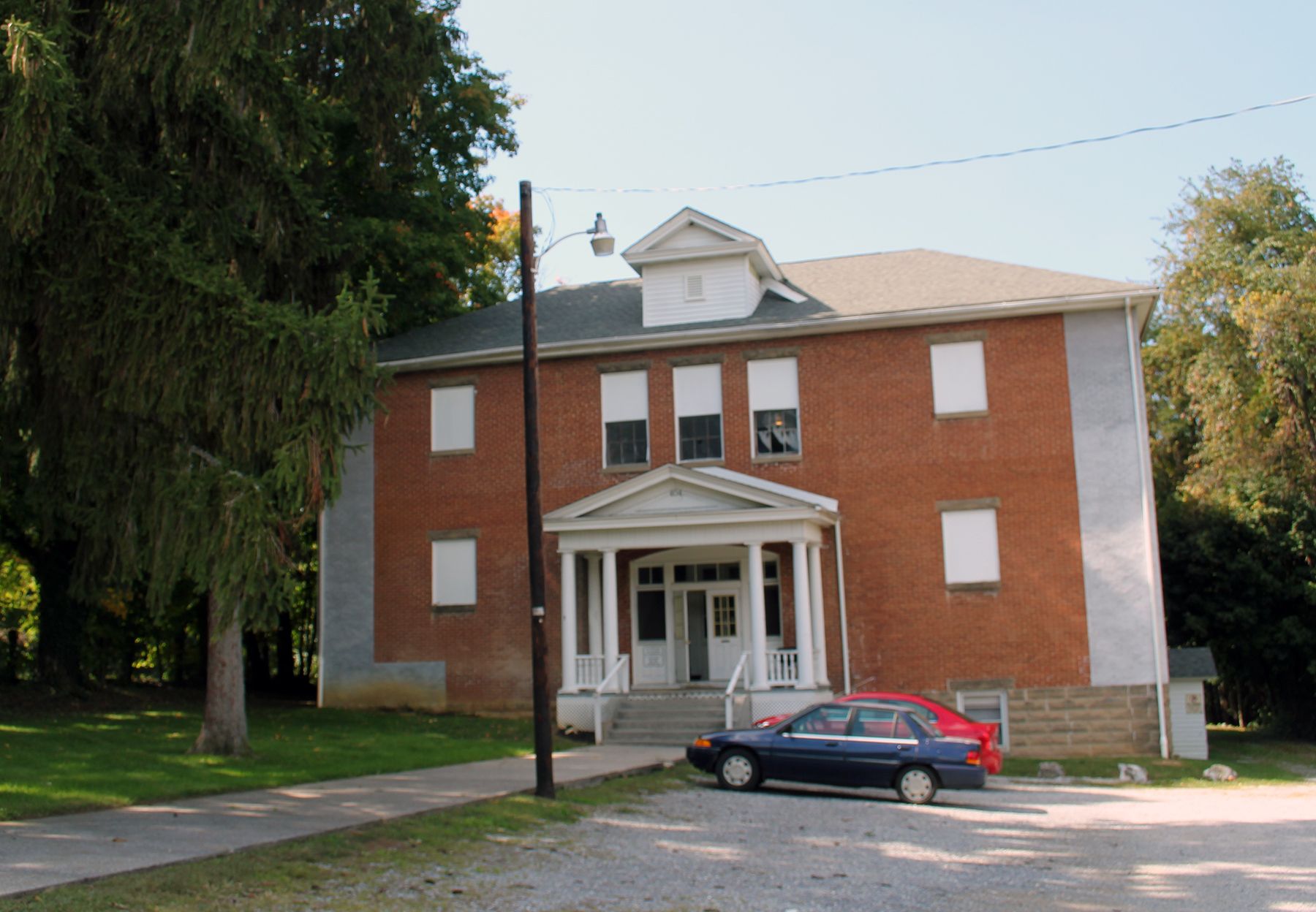
- Former school building

- Location within Virginia Location within the United States
- Location: E. Main St. from Roanoke and Pepper Sts. to the old high school and Park St. from E. Main to Lester St., Christiansburg, Virginia
- Coordinates: 37°7′57″N 80°24′22″W
- Area: 20 acres (8.1 ha)
- Architectural style: Colonial Revival, Queen Anne, Center-passage plan
- MPS: Montgomery County MPS
- NRHP reference No.: 90002008
- VLR No.: 154-0001

Significant dates
- Added to NRHP: January 10, 1991
- Designated VLR: June 20, 1989

East Main Street Historic District is a national historic district located at Christiansburg, Montgomery County, Virginia. The district encompasses 45 contributing buildings and 1 contributing site in the town of Christiansburg. It includes principally single family brick and frame dwellings dated to the late-19th and early-20th centuries. They are reflective of a variety of popular architectural styles, in including Colonial Revival and Queen Anne. It also includes two early 19th century log houses, St. Thomas Episcopal Church, the much altered Christiansburg Municipal Building, the early 20th century former Christiansburg High School buildings, and an elementary school.

It was listed on the National Register of Historic Places in 1991.

== Gallery ==
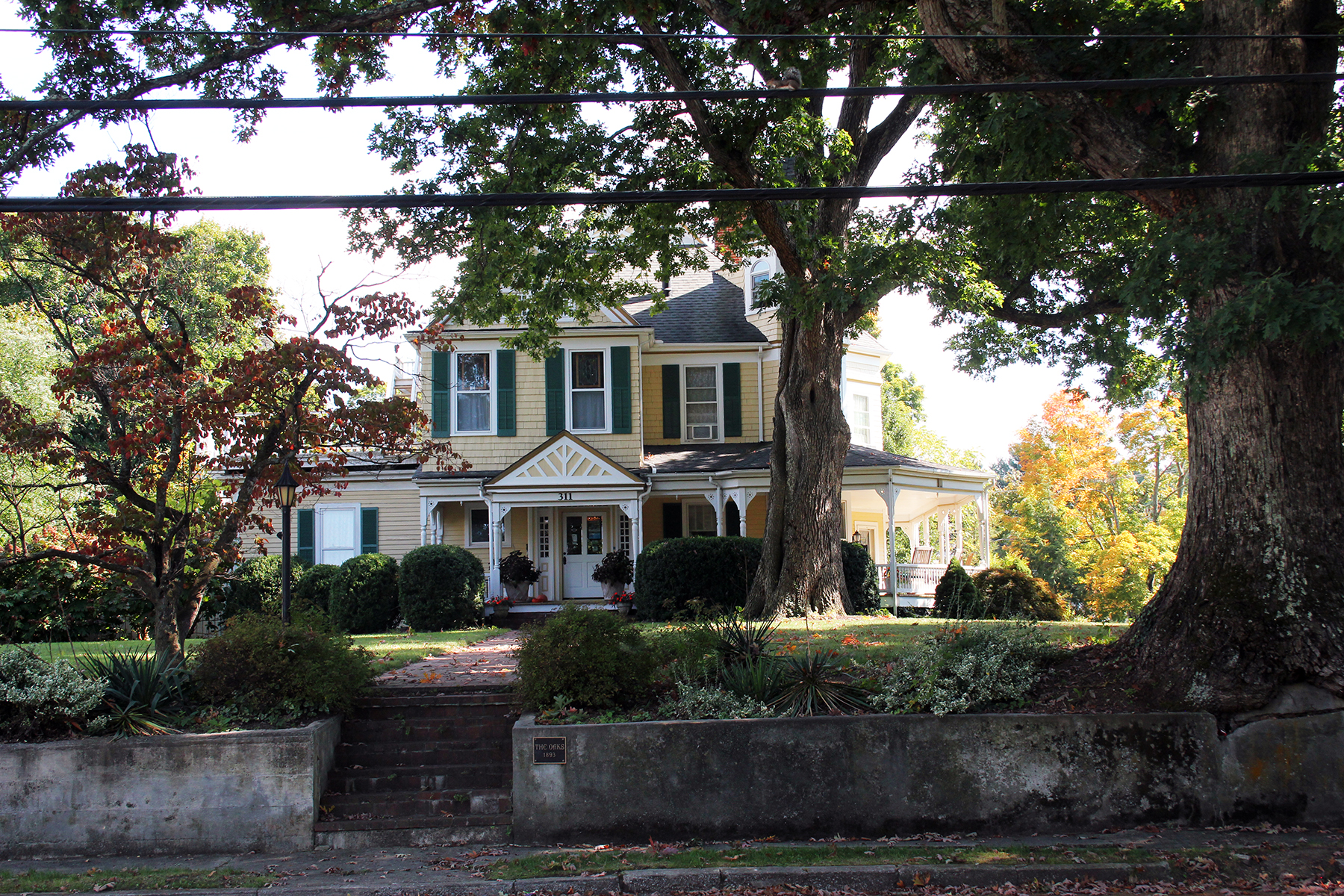
The Oaks at 311 East Main Street

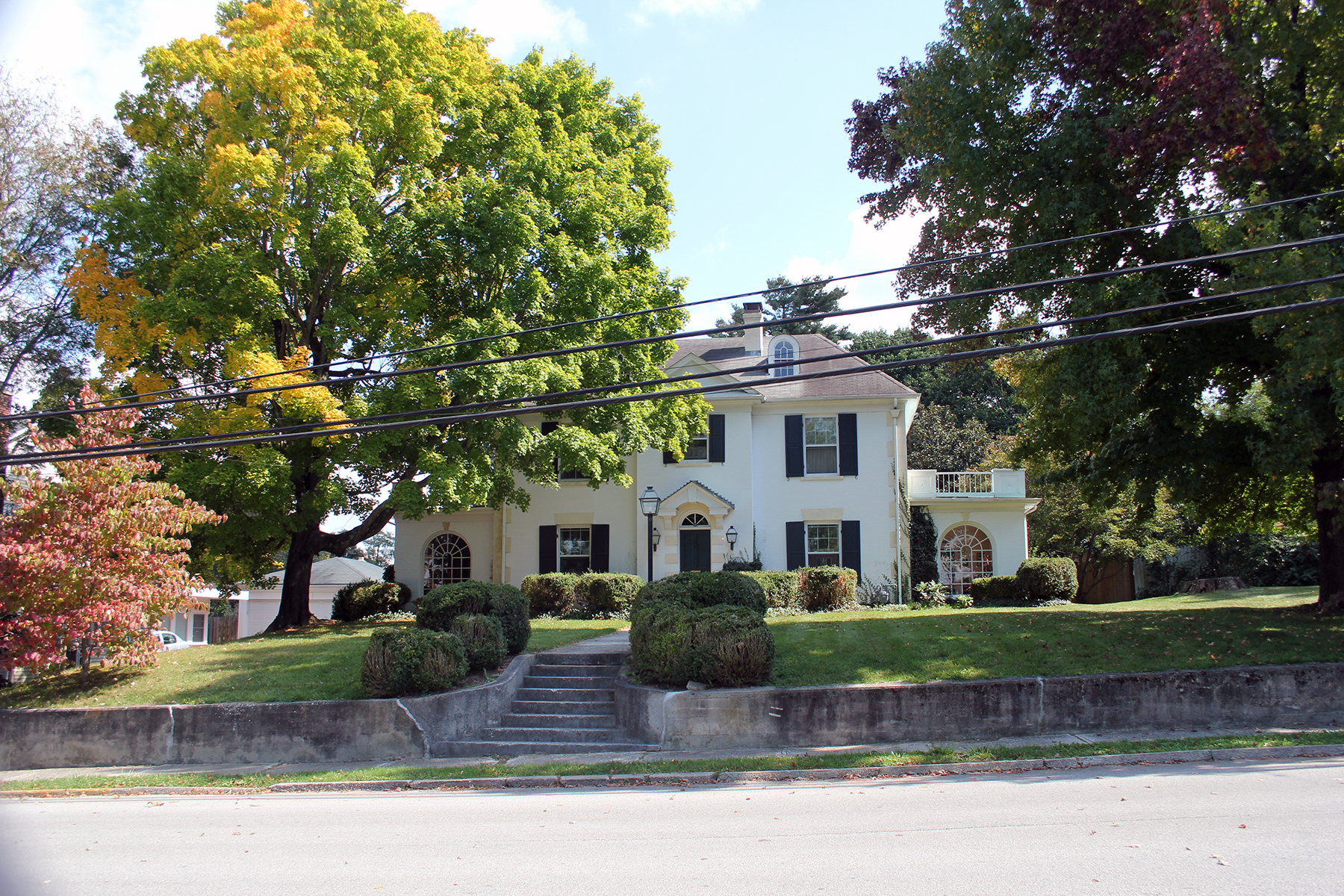
398 East Main Street

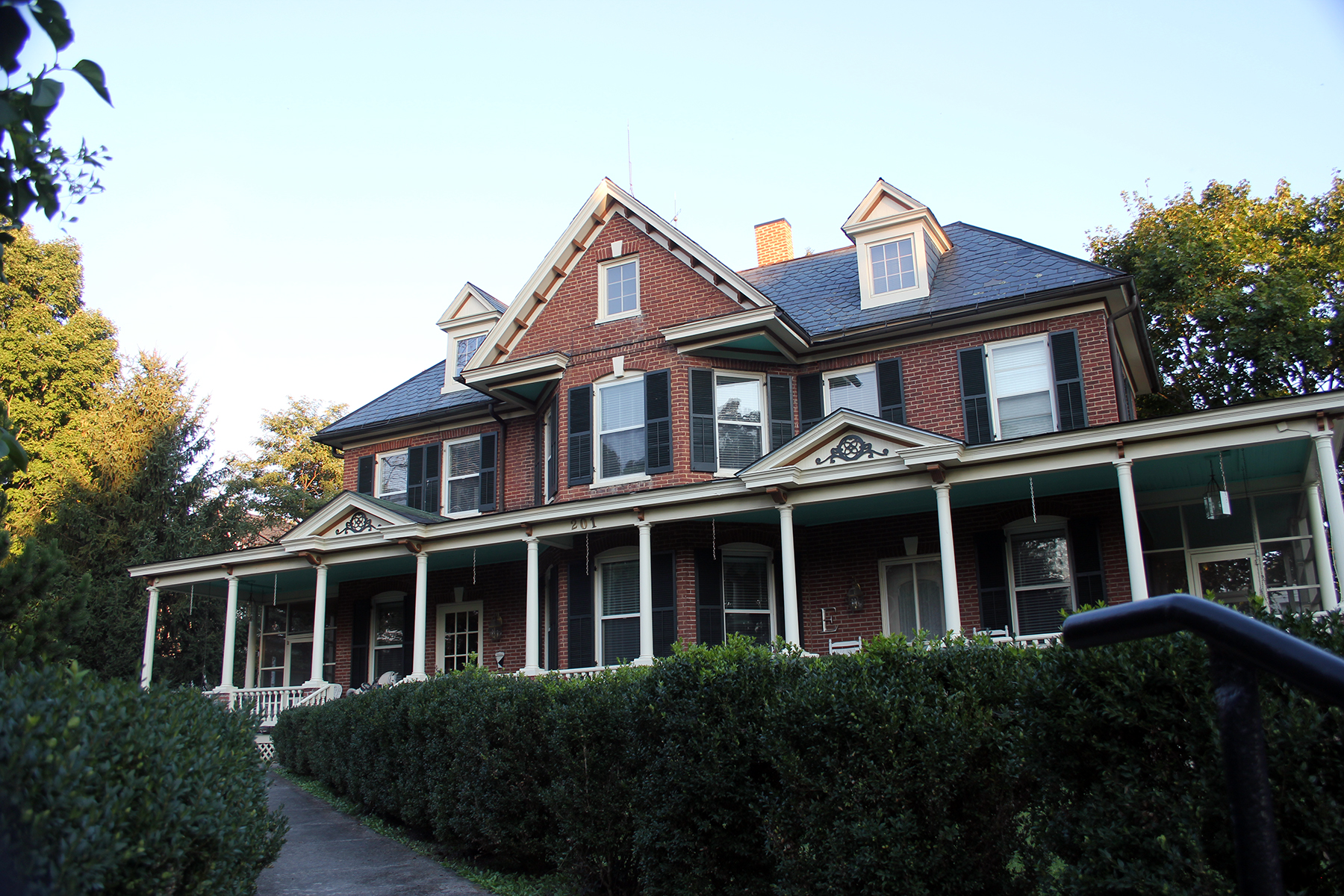
300 East Main Street

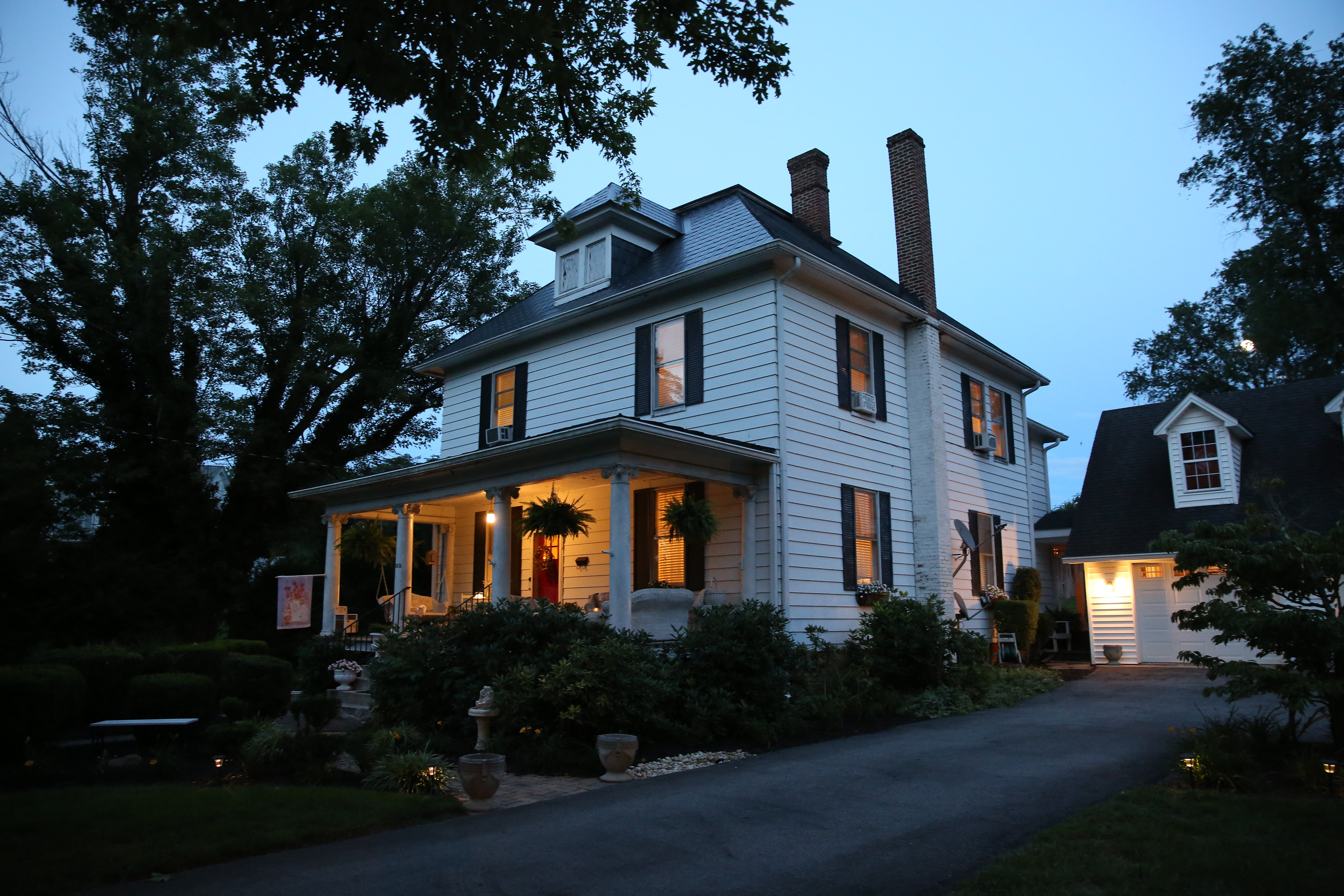
Inn The Park at 305 East Main Street
