= Mathias Mitchell Public Square–Main Street Historic District =

Historic district in Wisconsin, United States

- U.S. National Register of Historic Places
- U.S. Historic district
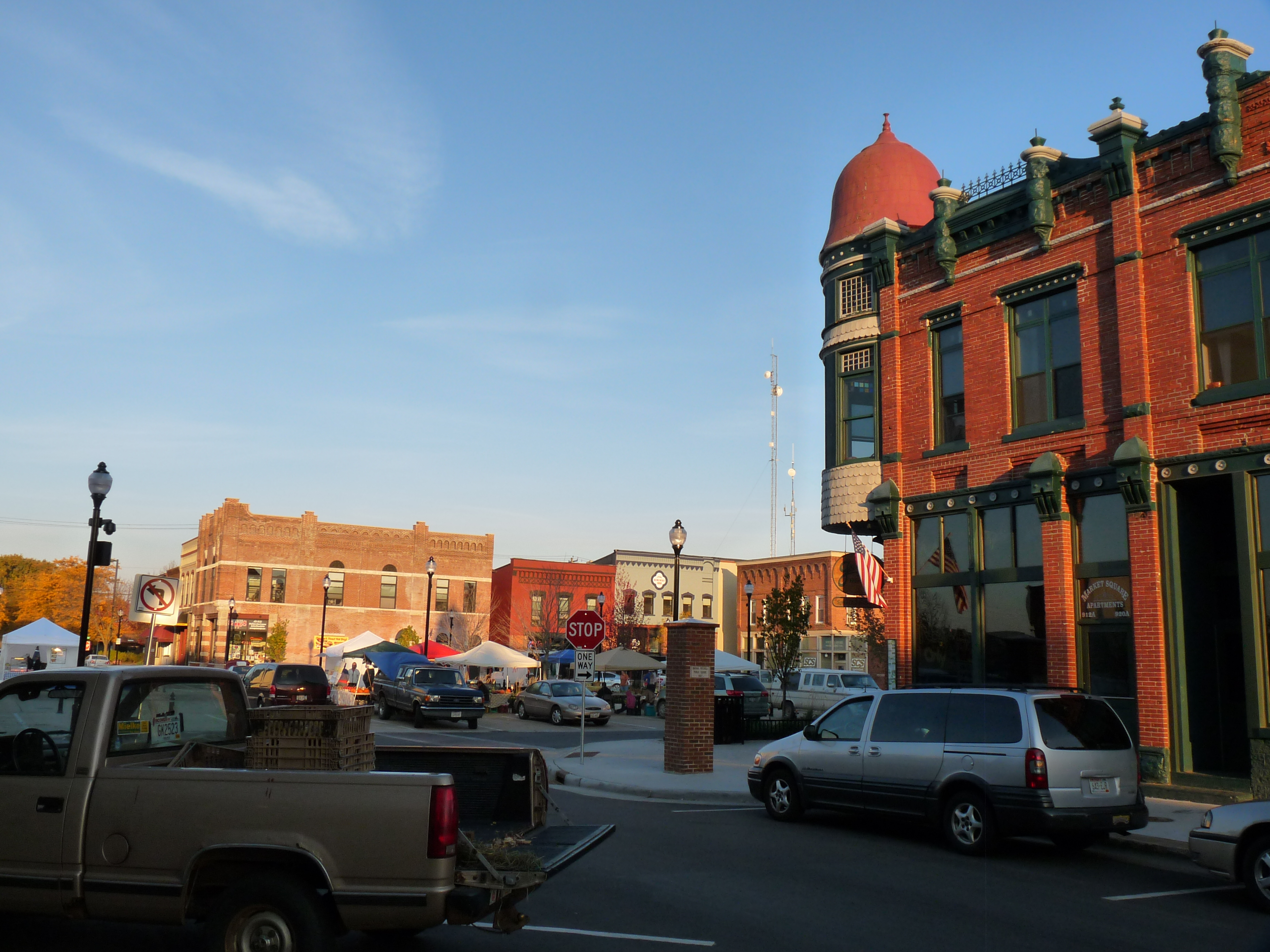
- A portion of the district.
- Location: Stevens Point, Wisconsin
- Coordinates: 44.52342°N 89.58447°W
- NRHP reference No.: 86001513
- Added to NRHP: August 13, 1986

The Mathias Mitchell Public Square–Main Street Historic District is located in Stevens Point, Wisconsin. It was added to the National Register of Historic Places in 1986.
