= Main Street Historic District (Manchester, Connecticut) =

Historic district in Connecticut, United States

- U.S. National Register of Historic Places
- U.S. Historic district
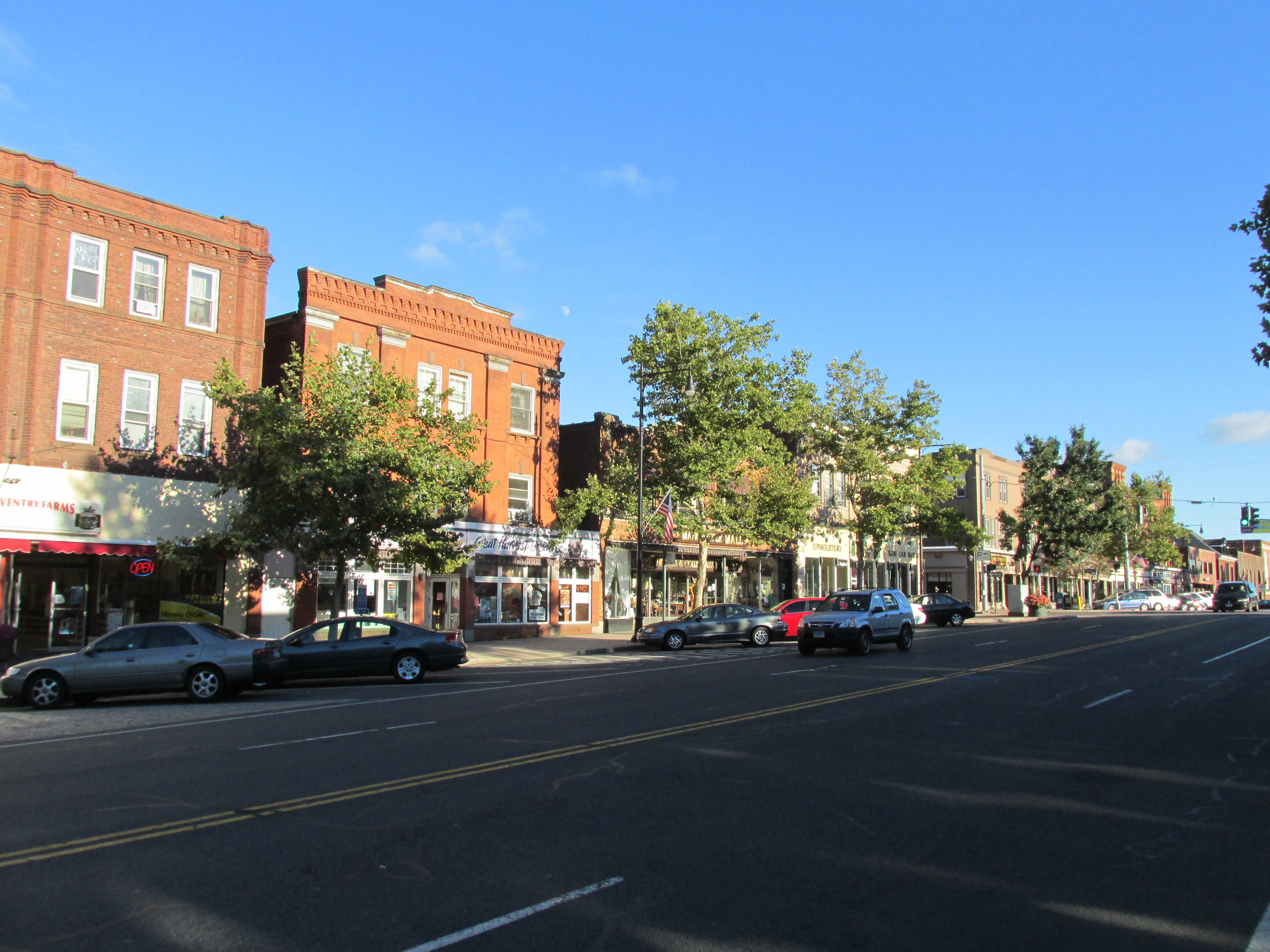
- Main Street

- Location within Connecticut Location within the United States
- Location: Roughly, Main Street from Center Street to Eldridge Street, Manchester, Connecticut
- Coordinates: 41.77157°N 72.52107°W
- Area: 50 acres (20 ha)
- Architect: Multiple
- Architectural style: Colonial Revival, Late Gothic Revival, Romanesque
- NRHP reference No.: 96000428
- Added to NRHP: April 18, 1996

The Main Street Historic District encompasses most of the historic central business district of Manchester, Connecticut. It runs along Main Street between Eldridge and Center Streets, including the cluster of civic and municipal buildings at Center Park. The district was largely built up between 1890 and 1940, and includes a remarkable concentration of high-quality Colonial Revival construction. The district was listed on the National Register of Historic Places in 1996.

== Description and history ==
Manchester was settled in the 17th century, but remained an essentially agricultural community until the 19th century. Its industrial growth was spurred most significantly by the Cheney Brothers silk manufacturing operation, established in 1838 and one of the most successful businesses of its type in the world. Main Street is a north-south thoroughfare east of the Cheney mills, and was developed over the period 1890-1940 to become the town's principal commercial area. The Cheney family were influential in this trend, building commercial buildings and donating land for parks and municipal facilities.

The historic district is anchored at the north end by Center Memorial Park, at the junction of Main and Center Streets. The park, whose land was donated by the Cheneys, is also home to the Cheney Memorial Library, also a Cheney donation, as was the probate court building adjacent to the library. Extending south as far as Edridge Street are a mixed collection of primarily commercial buildings. A significant majority of them are basically Colonial Revival in style, and as a group, form a distinctive catalog of adaptive changes in this style over time.

== See also ==
- National Register of Historic Places listings in Hartford County, Connecticut
