= Madison Square–West Main Street Historic District =

Historic district in New York, United States

- U.S. National Register of Historic Places
- U.S. Historic district
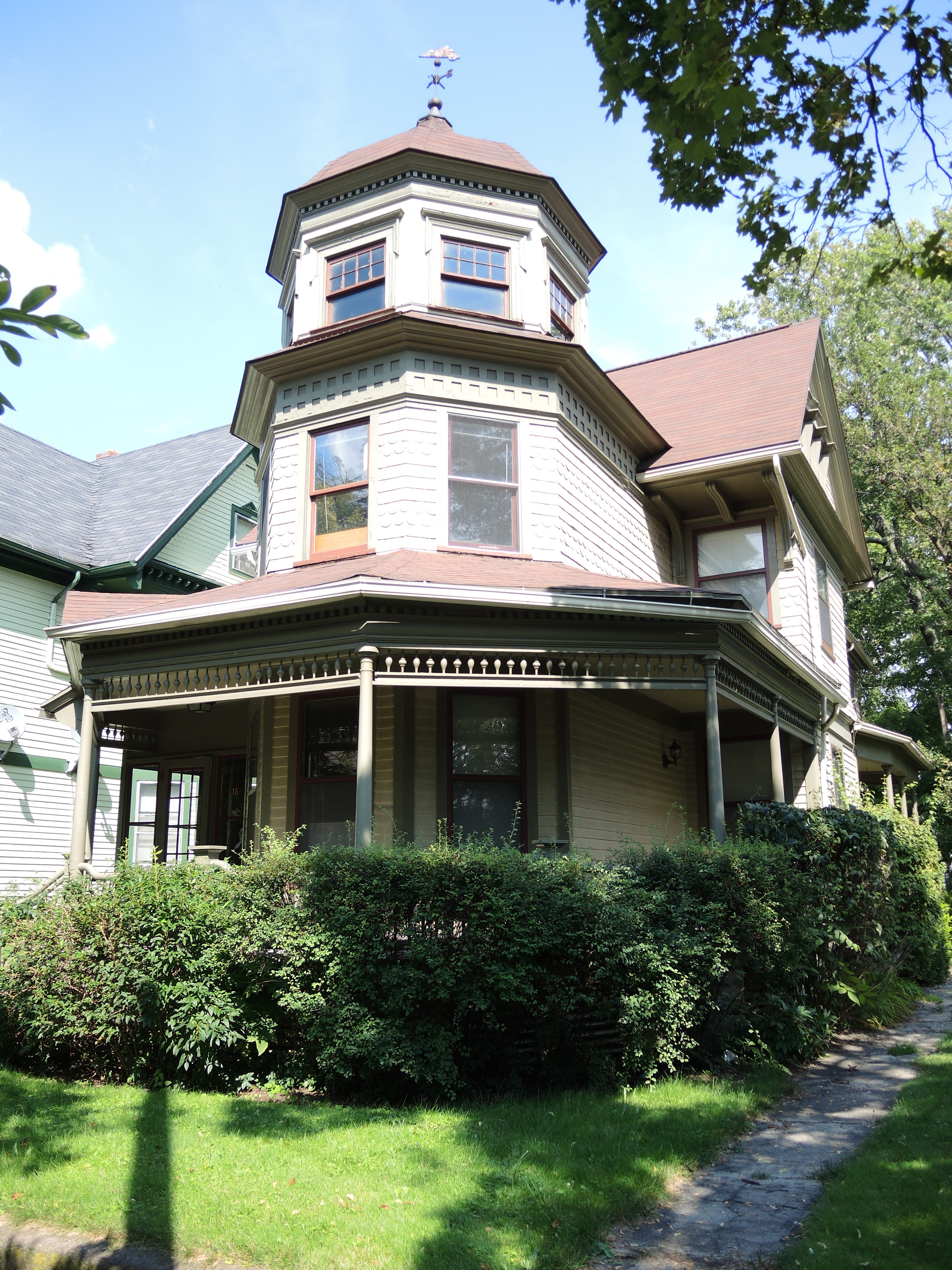
- 16 Madison Street in Rochester, New York

- Location within New York Location within the United States
- Location: Roughly bounded by Silver, Canal, W. Main and Madison Sts., Rochester, New York
- Coordinates: 43°9′14″N 77°37′37″W
- Area: 22.3 acres (9.0 ha)
- Architect: Multiple
- Architectural style: Late 19th And 20th Century Revivals, Greek Revival, Late Victorian
- NRHP reference No.: 88002382
- Added to NRHP: November 03, 1988

Madison Square–West Main Street Historic District is a national historic district located in the Susan B. Anthony Neighborhood of Rochester in Monroe County, New York. The district consists of 102 contributing structures and two contributing sites. Sixty five of the contributing structures are residential, with three contributing dependencies. Also in the district are 24 contributing commercial buildings and nine industrial buildings. The two sites are Susan B. Anthony Square and a former carriage company storage yard. Located within the district boundaries is the separately listed Susan B. Anthony House.

It was listed on the National Register of Historic Places in 1988.

== See also ==
- National Register of Historic Places listings in Rochester, New York
