= South Main Street Residential Historic District (Statesboro, Georgia) =

Historic district in Georgia, United States

- U.S. National Register of Historic Places
- U.S. Historic district
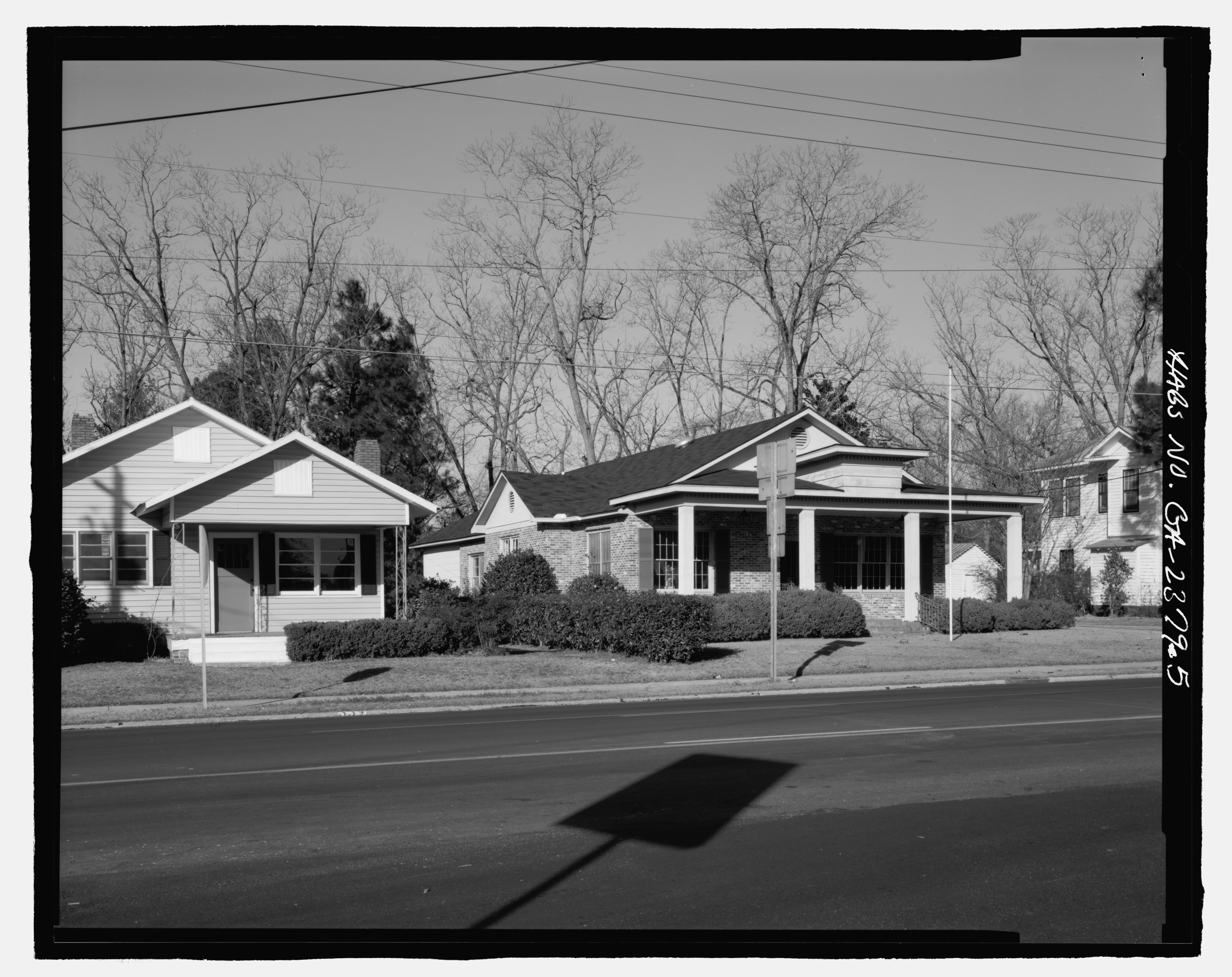

- Location within Georgia Location within the United States
- Location: Roughly College Ln., Southern Railway right-of-way, Walnut, Mikell, and S. Main Sts., Statesboro, Georgia
- Coordinates: 32°26′25″N 81°47′1″W
- Built: 1910
- Architect: Averott, K.B.; Franklin, A.J.
- Architectural style: Bungalow/Craftsman, Queen Anne, American Foursquare
- MPS: Downtown Statesboro MPS
- NRHP reference No.: 89001161
- Added to NRHP: September 6, 1989

South Main Street Residential Historic District in Statesboro, Georgia is a historic district that was listed on the National Register of Historic Places in 1989. It consists of 15 contributing buildings on properties along South Main Street and is bordered on the west by Walnut Street and on the east by railroad tracks.

It was deemed significant architecturally as collection of early 20th-century bungalows that make up an intact neighborhood of single-family homes. The houses were built during 1910 to 1930. The majority of the houses are 1- or 1 1/2-story houses with wide porches, broad roofs, and Craftsman woodwork details. The neighborhood includes an American Foursquare house and a few with Victorian Eclectic details.
