= Madison Street Historic District (Clarksville, Tennessee) =

Historic district in Tennessee, United States

- U.S. National Register of Historic Places
- U.S. Historic district
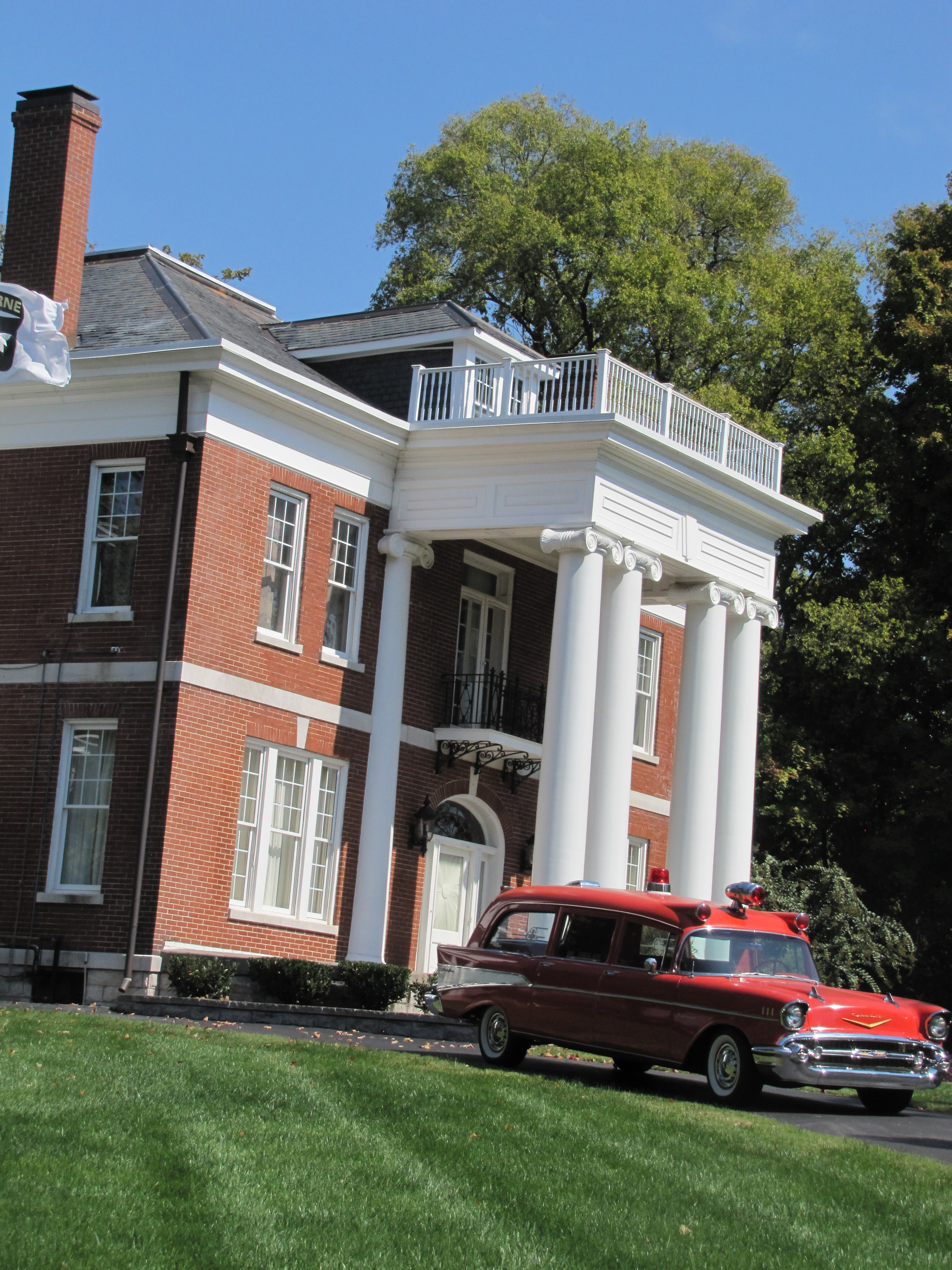

- Location within Tennessee Location within the United States
- Location: Address Restricted, Clarksville, Tennessee
- Coordinates: 36°31′29″N 87°20′32″W
- Architect: Clarence K. Colley
- Architectural style: Colonial Revival, Tudor Revival
- MPS: Clarksville MPS
- NRHP reference No.: 99001393
- Added to NRHP: November 22, 1999

Madison Street Historic District in Clarksville, Tennessee is a historic district that was listed on the National Register of Historic Places in 1999. The district includes work by Clarence Colley, a prominent Nashville architect active in the early decades of the 20th century.
