= National Register of Historic Places listings in Henderson County, Kentucky =

Location of Henderson County in Kentucky

This is a list of the National Register of Historic Places listings in Henderson County, Kentucky.

This is intended to be a complete list of the properties and districts on the National Register of Historic Places in Henderson County, Kentucky, United States. The locations of National Register properties and districts for which the latitude and longitude coordinates are included below, may be seen in a map.

There are 27 properties and districts listed on the National Register in the county, of which 4 are part of a National Historic Landmark spread across multiple counties. Another property was once listed but has been removed.

This National Park Service list is complete through NPS recent listings posted June 6, 2026.

== Current listings ==
| | Name on the Register | Image | Date listed | Location | City or town | Description |
|---|---|---|---|---|---|---|
| 1 | Alves Historic District | Alves Historic District | September 7, 1989 (#89001151) | Roughly bounded by Green, Center, S. Alvasia, Powell, S. Adams, and Washington Sts. 37°50′05″N 87°35′09″W | Henderson | |
| 2 | Archeological Site KHC-3 (15HE635) | Archeological Site KHC-3 (15HE635) | April 1, 1986 (#86000641) | In the lawn of a house on Reed Bluff City Rd., northeast of Bluff City; 37°48′54″N 87°22′12″W | Hebbardsville | Part of the Green River Shell Middens Archeological District National Historic Landmark |
| 3 | Archeological Site KHC-4 (15HE580) | Archeological Site KHC-4 (15HE580) | April 1, 1986 (#86000642) | Right bank of the Green River, 1 mile (1.6 km) above Bluff City; 37°48′25″N 87°21′56″W | Hebbardsville | Part of the Green River Shell Middens Archeological District National Historic Landmark |
| 4 | Audubon School | Audubon School | December 22, 1998 (#98001497) | 1400 Clay St. 37°49′32″N 87°34′48″W | Henderson | |
| 5 | John James Audubon State Park | John James Audubon State Park | March 10, 1988 (#87002220) | U.S. Route 41; 37°52′56″N 87°32′53″W | Henderson | |
| 6 | Barret House | Barret House | January 5, 1978 (#78001340) | 204 S. Elm St. 37°50′08″N 87°35′36″W | Henderson | |
| 7 | Barret-Keach Farm | Barret-Keach Farm | January 11, 2001 (#00001596) | 1586 Kentucky Route 136 W. 37°47′58″N 87°39′25″W | Henderson | |
| 8 | Bluff City Shell Mound (15HE160) | Bluff City Shell Mound (15HE160) | April 1, 1986 (#86000644) | 0.5 miles (0.80 km) above Bluff City on a Green River bluff 37°47′58″N 87°22′20″W | Hebbardsville | Part of the Green River Shell Middens Archeological District National Historic Landmark |
| 9 | Delano-Alves House | Delano-Alves House | February 11, 1993 (#93000044) | 536 Chestnut St. 37°49′34″N 87°35′50″W | Henderson | |
| 10 | E.L. Ehlen Livery and Sale Stable | | November 16, 1989 (#89002007) | 110 1st St. 37°50′22″N 87°35′36″W | Henderson | Building Demolished. Replaced by U.S. Post Office |
| 11 | Geibel House | Geibel House | December 10, 1998 (#98001491) | 327 N. Main St. 37°50′34″N 87°35′26″W | Henderson | |
| 12 | J. Hawkins Hart House | J. Hawkins Hart House | February 11, 2011 (#11000005) | 630 Center St. 37°50′06″N 87°35′11″W | Henderson | Designed by architect George Franklin Barber |
| 13 | Henderson Armory | Henderson Armory | September 6, 2002 (#02000928) | 735 N. Elm St. 37°50′51″N 87°35′09″W | Henderson | |
| 14 | Henderson Commercial District | Henderson Commercial District | November 13, 1989 (#89001975) | Roughly bounded by Main, 3rd, Elm, and 1st Sts. 37°50′24″N 87°35′27″W | Henderson | |
| 15 | Henderson Cotton Mill Workers Housing District | Henderson Cotton Mill Workers Housing District | December 10, 1998 (#98001495) | Roughly bounded by Washington, Letcher, and Powell Sts., and Ranklin Ave. 37°49′46″N 87°34′46″W | Henderson | |
| 16 | Henderson Louisville and Nashville Railroad Depot | Henderson Louisville and Nashville Railroad Depot | May 14, 1980 (#80001549) | 300 Clark St. 37°50′12″N 87°34′39″W | Henderson | |
| 17 | Jackson-Ijames Farm | Jackson-Ijames Farm | January 4, 2001 (#00001593) | 12500 S. Kentucky Route 1078; 37°46′50″N 87°27′54″W | Henderson | Also known as "Tallmadge" |
| 18 | James Giles Shell Midden (15HE589) | James Giles Shell Midden (15HE589) | April 1, 1986 (#86000646) | Left bank of the Green River, east of Bluff City; 37°48′20″N 87°19′31″W | Bluff City | Part of the Green River Shell Middens Archeological District National Historic Landmark |
| 19 | Klee Funeral Parlor | Klee Funeral Parlor | November 16, 1989 (#89002006) | 13-17 S. Main St. 37°50′18″N 87°35′37″W | Henderson | |
| 20 | John E. McCallister House | John E. McCallister House | September 21, 1982 (#82002701) | 839 N. Green St. 37°50′54″N 87°35′00″W | Henderson | |
| 21 | North Main Street Historic District | North Main Street Historic District | March 7, 1990 (#90000297) | N. Main St. from 5th to 8th Sts. 37°51′04″N 87°35′17″W | Henderson | |
| 22 | John O'Byrne House | John O'Byrne House | March 22, 1990 (#90000485) | 317 N. Main St. 37°50′34″N 87°35′27″W | Henderson | |
| 23 | Prichett House | Prichett House | December 10, 1998 (#98001490) | 311 N. Main St. 37°50′33″N 87°35′27″W | Henderson | |
| 24 | St. Paul's Episcopal Church | St. Paul's Episcopal Church | October 19, 1978 (#78001341) | 338 Center St. 37°50′13″N 87°35′25″W | Henderson | |
| 25 | William Soaper Farm | William Soaper Farm | January 11, 2001 (#00001595) | 2323 Zion Rd. 37°49′57″N 87°33′39″W | Henderson | |
| 26 | South Main and South Elm Streets Historic District | South Main and South Elm Streets Historic District | May 11, 1992 (#92000500) | Roughly bounded by Washington, Center, S. Green, Jefferson, S. Main, and Water Sts. 37°50′02″N 87°35′45″W | Henderson | |
| 27 | Stewart House | Stewart House | December 22, 1998 (#98001496) | 827 S. Green St. 37°49′40″N 87°35′58″W | Henderson | |

== Former listing ==
| | Name on the Register | Image | Date listed | Date removed | Location | City or town | Description |
|---|---|---|---|---|---|---|---|
| 1 | Douglass High School | | August 18, 1980 (#80001548) | February 3, 1988 | 300 S. Alvasia St. | Henderson | |

== See also ==
- List of National Historic Landmarks in Kentucky
- National Register of Historic Places listings in Kentucky
