= Barret House =

Barret House may refer to:

- Barret House (Henderson, Kentucky), listed on the National Register of Historic Places in Henderson County, Kentucky
- Barret-Keach Farm, Henderson, Kentucky, listed on the National Register of Historic Places in Henderson County, Kentucky
- Tol Barret House, Nacogdoches, Texas, listed on the National Register of Historic Places in Nacogdoches County, Texas
- Barret House (Richmond, Virginia), listed on the National Register of Historic Places in Richmond, Virginia

== See also ==
- Barrett House (disambiguation)
