= Barrett House =

Barrett House may refer to:

in the United States (by state then city)

- William G. Barrett House, Sausalito, California, listed on the National Register of Historic Places (NRHP) in Marin County
- Barrett-Blakeman House, Greensburg, Kentucky, listed on the NRHP in Green County
- Barret House (Henderson, Kentucky), NRHP-listed
- Dr. Lewis Barrett House, Munfordville, Kentucky, listed on the NRHP in Hart County
- P. J. Barrett Block, Adams, Massachusetts, listed on the NRHP in Berkshire County
- Col. James Barrett Farm, Concord, Massachusetts, listed on the NRHP in Middlesex County
- Randolph Columbus Barrett House, Doniphan, Missouri, National Register of Historic Places in Ripley County
- Martin Barrett House, Dillon, Montana, listed on the NRHP in Beaverhead County
- Barrett House (New Ipswich, New Hampshire)
- Oliver Barrett House, Millerton, New York, listed on the NRHP in Dutchess County
- Barrett House (Poughkeepsie, New York), listed on the NRHP in Dutchess County
- Barrett-Faulkner House, Peachland, North Carolina, listed on the NRHP in Anson County
- George Barrett Concrete House, Spring Valley, Ohio, listed on the NRHP in Greene County
- Rufus Barrett Stone House, Bradford, Pennsylvania, listed on the NRHP in McKean County
- William & Elizabeth Barrett Farmstead, Mendon, Utah, listed on the NRHP in Cache County
- Richard Barrett House, Park City, Utah, listed on the National Register of Historic Places in Summit County
- Barrett-Chumney House, Amelia Courthouse, Virginia, listed on the NRHP in Amelia County
- Everett P. Barrett House, Waukesha, Wisconsin, listed on the NRHP in Waukesha County
