= Henderson Commercial Historic District =

Henderson Commercial Historic District or Henderson Commercial District may refer to:

- Henderson Commercial District (Henderson, Kentucky), listed on the National Register of Historic Places (NRHP) in Henderson County, Kentucky
- Henderson Commercial Historic District (Henderson, Minnesota), listed on the NRHP in Minnesota
- Henderson Commercial Historic District (Henderson, Texas), NRHP-listed

== See also ==
- Henderson Central Business Historic District, Henderson, North Carolina, listed on the NRHP in Vance County, North Carolina
