= Geibel =

Geibel is a surname. Notable people with the surname include:

- Carl Geibel (1842–1910), Hungarian-born German book dealer and publisher
- Emanuel Geibel (1815–1884), German poet and playwright
- Hermann Geibel (1889–1972), German sculptor
- Paul Otto Geibel (1898–1966), German SS-Brigadeführer and Generalmajor of police

== See also ==
- Geibel Catholic High School, is a private Roman Catholic high school in Connellsville, Pennsylvania.
- Geibel House, at 327 N. Main St. in Henderson, Kentucky, was built in 1896.
