= Pierer =

Pierer is a German language surname. Notable people with the name include:

- Heinrich August Pierer (1794–1850), German lexicographer and publisher
- Heinrich von Pierer (born 1941), German manager
