= South Main and South Elm Streets Historic District =

- U.S. National Register of Historic Places
- Location within Kentucky Location within the United States
- Location: Roughly bounded by Washington, Center, S. Green, Jefferson, S. Main and Water Sts., Henderson, Kentucky
- Area: 49 acres (20 ha)
- Architect: Shopbell & Harris; Benjamin Bosworth Smith
- Architectural style: Late 19th and Early 20th Century American Movements architecture, Late 19th and 20th Century Revivals architecture, Late Victorian
- NRHP reference No.: 92000500
- Added to NRHP: May 11, 1992

The South Main and South Elm Streets Historic District in Henderson, Kentucky is a historic district which was listed on the National Register of Historic Places in 1992.

It includes all or part of 13 blocks roughly bounded by Washington, Center, S. Green, Jefferson, S. Main, and Water Streets, including 125 contributing buildings, four contributing structures, and a contributing site, on about 49 acres (20 ha).

Architects Shopbell & Harris and Benjamin Bosworth Smith designed works in the district.

It includes 125 contributing buildings, four contributing structures, and a contributing site, on 49 acres (20 ha).

It includes:

- Barret House, separately NRHP-listed in 1977
- St. Paul's Episcopal Church (1859), separately NRHP-listed in 1978, "the oldest Henderson church remaining in use by original denomination", which is in a "picturesque Gothic Revival style of stuccoed brick in a cruciform plan; all bays defined by simple stepped buttresses with stone caps and pointed arched windows with stone hood molds; gabled main facade has large pointed arch window topped by second, much larger stone hood mold in low relief and ornamental bracing with a pierced trefoil pattern; 3-stage square tower on northwest corner has Tudor-arched sain entrance, belfry with louvered lancet windows and tall 8-sided spire; 7-bay deep sanctuary has 3 aisles, original pews, exposed walnut beans and large pointed arch framing the chancel; geometrical tripartite window behind altar depicts scenes from life of St. Paul, said to be imported from Holland; parish house added 1881 by extending west transept 5 bays in same style as original; stucco added at unknown date; 2-story wing added to south side of parish house 1958; parish formed 1831 and built first church 1837 at corner Rain and Third; this second building designed by Bishop Benjamin Bosworth Smith, who visited England and is credited with designs of several mid-19th c. Episcopal churches in central KY inspired by a church in Stoke Poges, England; built by William Temperly of Maidson, IN. (NR nomination, OHH)" Also contributing is its "wrought iron fence with panelled posts and lancet pickets."

- Henderson County Public Library (1904), S. Main St.; designed "by prolific library architects Shopbell & Harris of Evansville, Indiana, the stone structure features a tall primary level on a full raised basement, an Ionic tetrastyle temple front at the entrance pavilion, tall windows with pedimented hoods, and a low dome on an octagonal drum." The library received funding from Andrew Carnegie as part of the philanthropist's Carnegie library program, but had issues finding a suitable lot in the town. The library was opened to the public on August 1, 1904. The Library underwent renovations in 2020, with a major expansion to the existing building.

== See also ==
- National Register of Historic Places listings in Henderson County, Kentucky
