= Fürstlich Sächsischer Hofbuchdruckerei zu Altenburg =

Fürstlich Sächsischer Hofbuchdruckerei (1594–1709)
- Founded: 1594
- Successor: Fürstl[ich]. Sächs[ischer].; Druckerey zu Torgau (1594–1604); Richter'sche Hofbuchdruckerei (1709–1799); Pierer'sche Hofbuchdruckerei (1799–1872); Pierer'sche Hofbuchdruckerei.; Stephan Geibel & Co. (1872–1919); Druckhaus "Maxim Gorki" Altenburg (1919–1947); Betrieb und VEB Druckhaus "Maxim Gorki" Altenburg (1950–1951); Thüringer Volksverlag GmbH (1951–1990); Maxim-Gorki-Druck GmbH (1990–1992); DZA Druckerei zu Altenburg GmbH (1992–present)
- Headquarters location: Altenburg, Germany
- Owner: Simon Tafertshofer (since 1993)
- Official website: www.dza-druck.de

Fürstlich Sächsischer Hofbuchdruckerei of Altenburg, Germany, is used generically in this article to denote a succession of book printers (sometimes synonymous with "publishers") based in Altenburg, in the German state of Thuringia (formerly East Germany), that — under various capacities, names, and owners – have endured as one continuous printing operation, without interruption (save and except wars), for four hundred and thirty-two years — since 1594, (Note: The earliest printing that was directly connected to the printers of this article is generally chronicled as 1594; however, Hans Stephan Geibel, while on a world tour in 1905, stated in the Salt Lake Tribune that the history of the printing operation dates back to 1540 – four hundred and eighty-six years ago (see citation below); or, put another way, 104 years after Johannes Gutenberg invented the printing press in 1436) the early modern German period. The bookbinding aspect of the business included a bindery.

== History ==
=== 16th century ===
The Fürstlich Sächsische Hofdruckerei, the ducal printing press, was established at the Hartenfels Castle (de) in Torgau in 1594 by appointment of Friedrich Wilhelm I, Duke of Saxe-Weimar (1562–1602). "Fürstlich Sächsische" roughly translates to "Prince of Saxony." The German prefix "Hof," an abbreviation for "Hoflieferant," denotes a royal appointment. The German word "druckerei" translates to "printer." The earliest extant publication is Torgauer Katechismus (Torgau Catechism) (c. 1594–95).

=== 17th century ===
In 1604, after the duke's death, the press moved to Altenburg. The earliest extant published work from the Altenburg press is Lotio Pedum (1606). In 1668, Gottfried Richter (1633–1696) received the book printing concession and, two years later, received the privilege of being a court publisher. During this period, his printing press was among the 20 known to produce the Biblia Germanica, the Luther Bible (1676), with the woodcut engravings of Jakob Mores (Mörs) (lived approx. 1540–1612). (Note: The Luther Bible was printed by Gottfried Richter – F.S. (Fürstlich Sächsischer) Hoff-buchdruckern an Altenbug – und Samuel Alolph Müllern zu Jena (see Archiv für Geschichte des Buchwesens, below))

=== 18th century ===
In 1709, Johann Ludwig Richter, one of Gottfried's sons, purchased the royal publishing house from Duke Ernest and, henceforth, it became known as Richter'sche Hofbuchdruckerei. Johann Ludwig Richter was appointed F.S. (Fürstlich Sächsischer) Hoff-buchdruckern and headed the firm until his death in 1736. His son, Paul Emanuel Richter, ran it from 1736 to 1742. The last owner, Karl Heinrich Emanuel Richter (1778–1800?), was young when he won control of the firm. Due partly to his inexperience and partly to a downturn in the economy, K.H.E. Richter sold the Hofbuchdruckdruckerei in 1799 under financial duress, mostly from pressure of creditors. K.H.E. Richter, who was also in the bookselling business, sold, in the same year, parts of his bookselling business to Hieronymus Wilhelm Christian Seidler (1765–1811) from Jena. Richter wanted to continue as a bookseller and did not want to lose his "Privilegium Exclusivum" (as a royal appointed book seller) but lost it nonetheless. K.H.E. Richter contested the loss of his royal appointment. His effort was an impetus for the founding of a publishing house that became Schnuphase'sche Buchhandlung of Altenburg, which was the forerunner to present-day firm, E. Reinhold Verlag (de).

=== 19th century ===
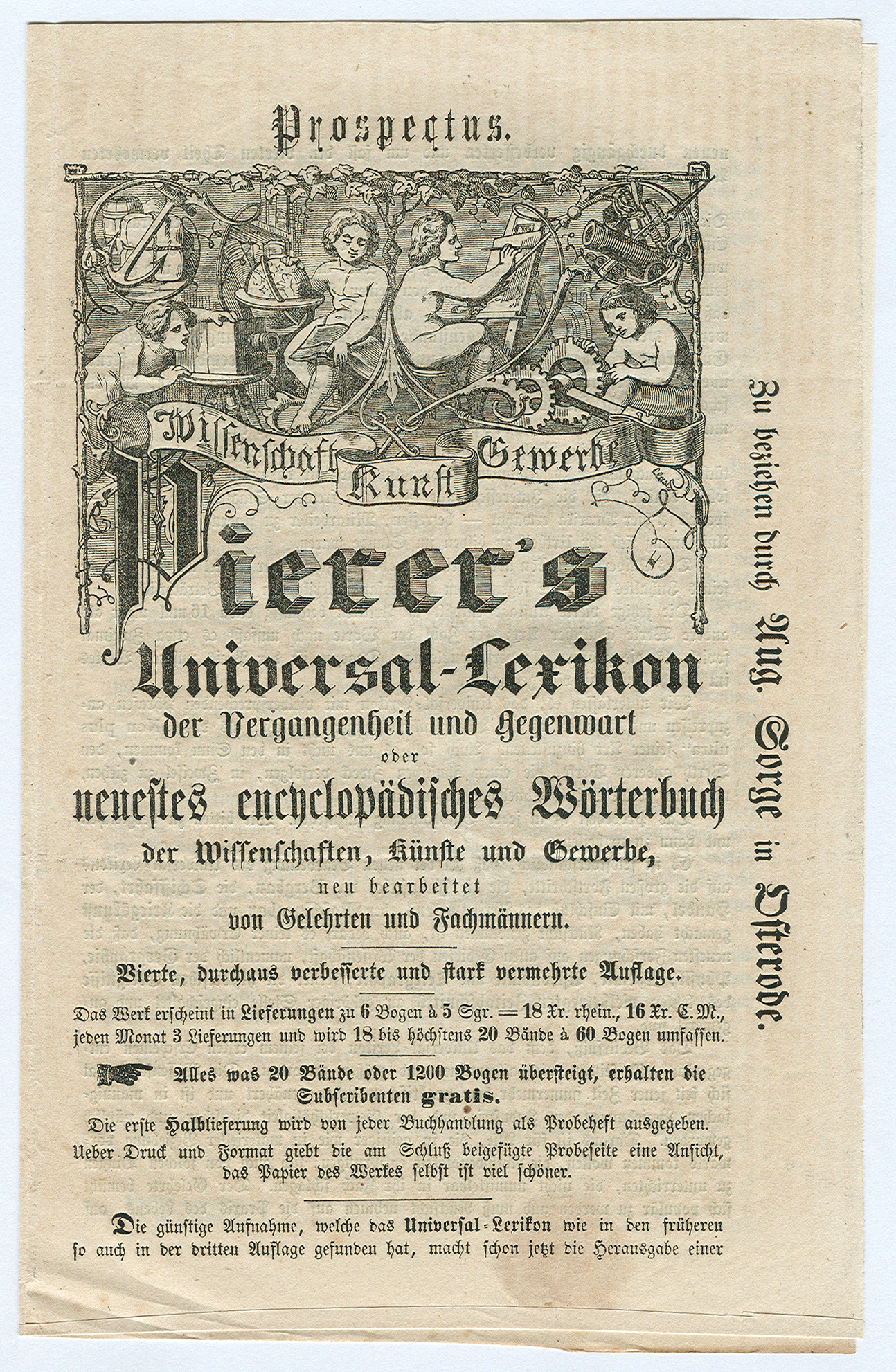
(1856) Prospectus (1 of 4 pages) forPierer's Universal-Lexikon(4th ed.)Distributed by August Sorge (de) (Note: August Sorge (de) was a book dealer — A. Sorge'sche Buchhandlung – in Osterode am Harz)

On 1 July 1799, the firm was acquired by Johann Friedrich Pierer (de) (1767–1832), and became known as Pierer'sche Hofbuchdruckerei. Pierer was a physician and, in 1826, became the official physician to the Duke. The book publishing company was owned by the Pierer family until 1871. During this time, the firm achieved international acclaim with published works that included Pierer's Universal-Lexikon (de), an encyclopedia edited by Heinrich August Pierer (1st ed. 1824–1826). (Note: Editions 1 through 5 of Pierer's Universal-Lexikon was published by Pierer'sche Hofbuchdruckerei, when Pierer was a court printer. Pierer did not control the publishing rights, which, in 1873, passed to Verlagshandlung von Ad. Spaarmann of Oberhausen, and in 1888, passed to publishing firm of Johann Wilhelm Spemann (de) (1844–1910) of Stuttgart. 1st ed. (1824–1826); Johann Friedrich Pierer (de) (ed.) 2nd ed. (1840–1846); Heinrich August Pierer (ed.) 3rd ed. (1848–1852); Heinrich August Pierer (ed.) 4th ed. (1857–1865); Julius Löbe (de) (1805–1900) (ed.) 5th ed. (1867–1873); Julius Löbe (de) (1805–1900) (ed.)) In 1843, Eugen Pierer (de) (1823–1890), one of H.A. Pierer's sons, joined the business. The Leipzig-Altenburg Railway – completed September 19, 1842 – greatly enhanced the supply chain from Pierer'sche Hofbuchdruckerei to bookdealers in Leipzig. The business managed to endure in the throes of the 1848 German revolution in Saxony. Upon the death of H.A. Pierer in 1850, Eugen became the sole managing director. In 1859, Eugen's brother, Alfred (1836–1901), joined the company and Eugen, henceforth, narrowed his responsibility to printing.

In 1872, the business was sold to a consortium of Leipzig publishers led by Stephan Geibel (1847–1903). In addition to Stephan Geibel, the consortium consisted of:

- Carl Geibel Jr. (1842–1910), brother of Stephan, who with his father, Carl Geibel Sr., around 1866, acquired the publishing firm of Duncker & Humblot (de)
- Richard Reisland (né Otto Richard Reisland; 1841–1915); in 1868, he became sole owner of Fues Verlag in Leipzig, which was founded in 1768 in Tübingen as L.W. Fues (Ludwig Friedrich Fues; 1765–1863); published works of Ferdinand Tönnies
- Otto Volckmar (né Otto Friedrich Friedrich Volckmar; 1835–1887), son of Friedrich Volckmar (de) (1799–1876) (Note: Friedrich Volckmar (de) (1799–1876) was the 1st cousin of Friedrich Arnold Brockhaus (1772–1823); that is, his mother, Johanne Justine Volckmar (née Brockhaus; 1763–1847) was the sister of Johann Adolf Henrich Brockhaus (1739–1811), the father of Friedrich Arnold Brockhaus)
- Carl Vörster (né Carl Frederich David Vörster; 1826–1899), son-in-law of Friedrich Volckmar (Note: F. Volckmar — a company founded in 1829 in Leipzig by Friedrich Volckmar (de) (1799–1876) and joined in 1849 by his son-in-law, Carl Voerster (1826–1899), who married his daughter, Marie Emilie Volckmar — became Koch, Neff und Volckmar (de); Jürgen Voerster (1926–2010), a fourth-generation managing heir, passed away sixteen years ago. The firm is currently co-managed by fifth-generation heirs; Carl Voerster's mother, Dorothea Sophia Francisca Voerster (née Volckmar; born 1793), was his wife's aunt – that is, his mother was the sister of his wife's father)
- Carl Geibel Sr. (de) (1806-1884)

In 1874, Stephan Geibel, the youngest son of Carl Geibel Sr., took over management and the firm became known as Offene Handelsgesellschaft (de) Pierer'sche Hofbuchdruckerei. Stephan Geibel & Co. Stephan was married to Wanda Geibel (née Freiin von Rothkirch-Trach), a granddaughter of Heinrich August Pierer.

=== 20th century ===
In 1919, the firm was reorganized as a Kommanditgesellschaft (limited partnership). By the 1920s, the firm began specializing in scientific publications. By 1925, the managing directors were Hans Stephan Geibel (Stephan Geibel's son) and Paul Hoffmann — Hoffman had been managing director since the death of Stephen Geibel in 1903.

In 1931, Pierersche Hofbuchdruckerei Stefan Geibel & Co. KG was located at 30/31 Hohe Straße. The personnel included Managing Director Hans Stephan Geibel, Director Curt Brandt, and authorized signatories Joachim von Baerensprung, Hanns Bretschneider, August Drescher, Hans Ernst and Heinrich Hansen. The firm had 500 employees. The equipment included 30 setting and casting machines, 45 printing machines, stereotypes, a font foundry, and a large bookbinding facility.

==== Post World War II ====
At the end of April 1945, near the end of World War II, the company resumed operations. The U.S. 304th Infantry Regiment was initially stationed at Altenburg until, in July 1945, Altenburg became part of the Soviet occupation zone. After Germany split into East and West Germany, the firm, based in East Germany, was forced to provide extensive reparation services to SWA-Verlag in Weimar, publisher for the Soviet Military Administration in Germany, and, to that end, printed more than 28 million books from 1947 to 1949.

On the basis of a denunciation, the directors, Hans Stephan Geibel and Max A. Geibel, sons of Stephan Geibel, were arrested in March 1950 and sentenced to prison by the District Court of Gera (de) in October 1950. The firm's assets were confiscated by the state of Thuringia at the turn of 1950–1951, which marked the end of the private enterprise, "Pierer'schen Hofbuchdruckerei Stephan Geibel & Co."

The company was reconstituted as Betrieb und VEB Druckhaus "Maxim Gorki" Altenburg, the namesake of a Russian and Soviet writer and five-time nominee for the Nobel Prize in Literature. In 1951, it was merged into Thüringer Volksverlag GmbH (de). From 1952 to 1990, the firm specialized in fiction and scientific publications. In 1956, the firm was transferred to the German Academy of Sciences at Berlin, and continued to print mostly scientific journals. (Note: As of 2001, company archives, documenting its history from 1929 to 1975, are housed at the Thuringian State Archives)

==== German reunification ====
On August 15, 1990, after the collapse of the GDR and the reunification of Germany, the firm was controlled by Treuhandanstalt, a government agency established to administer the selling of assets, including entire companies, that had been owned by the DDR. It was registered as Maxim-Gorki-Druck GmbH. Among other things, the firm upgraded from lead typesetting to photographic reproduction and offset printing. Maxim-Gorki-Druck GmbH dissolved on December 17, 1992.

=== 21st century ===
In 1993, the assets were purchased by Simon Tafertshofer and registered as a private entity in the state of Thüringen, registered court of Jena, as Druckerei zu Altenburg GmbH. The firm is currently known as DZA Druckerei zu Altenburg GmbH. Tafertshofer is managing director.

== Civic legacies ==
In 1991, the District of Altenburger Land opened a trade school, Johann-Friedrich-Pierer-Schule Altenburg (de).

== Selected published and printed works ==
=== Fürstlich Sächsischer Druckerei zu Torgau (1594–1604) ===
- (Torgauer Katechismus) Ein Christliches Handbüchlein, vor Die Durchlauchtige, Hochgeborne Fürstin und Fräulein, Fräulein Dorothea Sophia, und Fräulein Anna Maria, Hertzogin zu Sachssen, Landgräffin in Düringen, und Marggräffin zu Meißen, etc. Aus Christlicher, Gottseliger, und reiner Lehrer, Büchern und Schrifften zusam̄en getragen. Herr Jesu Christe, Segne meinen Eingang und Außgang, von nun an bis in Ewigkeit, In Fürstl[ich]. Sächs[ischer]. Druckerey zu Torgau, Anno M.D. XCIIII (1594); OCLC 258469096 (link via Deutsche Digitale Bibliothek (de), Martin Luther University of Halle-Wittenberg, Universitäts- und Landesbibliothek Sachsen-Anhalt (de))
  Later eds.
  1598 (Annaburg); OCLC 246297610
  1601 (Torgau); OCLC 950454619
  1634 (Leipzig) (alternate title), George Zöllner of Jena is credited as author in this edition; OCLC 935042318, 185193327, 923942308
- D[octoris]. Martini Lutheri Concionum Deibus Dominicis et Festis domi publiceq́[ue]; habitarum Ad Mandatum Illustriss: et Celsissimi Principis A[uria]C[i] D[omi]N[i]:
  D[omi]n[i]: Friderici Wilhelmi, Ducis Saxoniæ, Tutoris et Electoratus Saxonici Administratoris, Landgr[aviorum]. Thuringiæ, et Marchionis Mismiæ, etç., In Latinum sermonem à M[agister]. Johanne Wanckelio [(de)] traductarum
  - Pars I. Hyberna ("Winter") (1596); OCLC 837209122
  - Pars II. Æstiua ("Summer") (1596); OCLC 836983444, 257557900
  - Pars III. Autumnalis et de Festis ("Autumn and Holidays") (1597); OCLC 837209139

(these are teachings or sermons of Martin Luther, translated from German to Latin by Johanne Wanckel (de))

=== Gedruckt und Verlagen von Gottfried Richtern (1668–1670) / F.S. Hoff-Buchdruckern, Altenburg (1670–1709) ===
- Reifflich betrachtete und Christmüthig verachtete Eitelkeit des nichtig- und flüchtigen Welt-Wesens, by Johann Damian Ehrenholds von Rochlitz aus Meissen (pseudonym of Jacob Daniel Ernst; 1640–1707), Gedruckt und Verlagen von Gottfried Richtern / F.S. Hoff-Buchdruckern / Im Jahre 1676; OCLC 731476627, 56283935, 318400386, OCLC 54211849
- Die Neu-Zugerichtete Historische Confect-Taffel: Worauff in Einhundert anmuthigen, Schaaten, viel und mancherley außerlesene, sehr denckwürdige, und meistertheils neue Trauer- Lust- und Lehr-Geschichten also auffgesetzt worden: daß jedwede mit angenehmer Kürtze auffgetragene Erzehlung, einen sonderbahren Spruch H[eilige]. Schrifft, mit ihrer Hauptlehre bestätiget, und was bey denen vielfältigen Umbständen merckwürdig, durch beygefügte nützliche Erinnerungen, erbaulich gezeiget wird. Denen Geschichts-liebenden Gemüthern zu sonderbahren Nutz und Ergetzung verfertiget, und öffentlich auffgestellet Von M[agister]. Jacob Daniel Ernsten, P[astor]. [zu] C[riebitzsch]. (Jacob Daniel Ernst; 1640–1707)
  - 1677: OCLC 634581531
  - 1681: OCLC 257627379
  - 1682: OCLC 832512760, 303405845
  - 1690: OCLC 560518540, 891212051, 251692125
  - 1698: OCLC 696027592, 22567307, 833301942, OCLC 833301920, 833301930, 707095293
  - 1722: OCLC 311603427
- Around thirty Latin and German poems published on Dorothea Friderica Kuntsch's death (January 1690, age 9)
  1. Latin and German poems by Christoph [von] Kuntsch's friends and colleagues, "Cerbum Luctum Quem Vir Praenobilissimus"; OCLC 839751212, 257298502
  2. Latin and German poems by local teachers and clergymen, "Cupressus Funerea in funere Virginis"; OCLC 257299309
    Selected poems:
    1. "Das Beklagte und getröstet Vater- und Mutter Hertze," by Christoph Reim, a theological student
    2. "Schuldigste Condolentz," ... by J.H.S., Dorothea's tutor
    3. "Uber die Toden- Grufft Der Nummehro Seeligsten Jf. Dorotheen Friedericen Kuntschin," ... by Gottfried Stockman, Kuntsch's future son-in-law
    4. "Als Jhre Hertzlich-geliebte Einige Schwester ... Durch einen unverhofften wiewol seeligen Todt aus allen Jammer erlöset wurde," ... by Margarethe Elizabeth Kuntsch

=== Pierer'sche Hofbuchdruckerei, Stefan Geibel & Co., Altenburg (1872–1950) ===
- "Das Ursprungsjahr des Montanismus" (subject: Montanism), by Daniel Völter (sv) (1855–1942), published as a 16-page book (1884); OCLC 32953758
  Originally published in Zeitschrift für Wissenschaftliche Theologie (magazine), Adolf Hilgenfeld (ed.), Vol. 27, N° 1 (1883), pps. 23–36; OCLC 855580243, 312892038
- Unterm Birnbaum (de) (link via Google Books), by Theodor Fontane, Grote'sche Sammlung von Werken zeitgenössischer Schriftsteller (Grote's collection of works by Contemporary Writers), Dreiundzwanzigster Band (Vol. 23 of 77), Berlin: G. Grote'sche Verlagsbuchhandlung (publisher), Pierer’sche Hofbuchdruckerei. Stephan Geibel & Co. in Altenburg (printer) (1885); OCLC 918054256
Vintage ornate drop cap initials used in the 1885 edition of Unterm Birnbaum
A
16, 105, 126

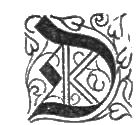
D
24, 60, 70, 115, 142

E
9, 34, 87, 150

F
121

H
92

T
138

S
45

U
50

V
1, 81
(aside from the ornate drop caps above, the body text of early German printers used schwabacher and fraktur blackletter fonts that,
in comparison to serif and sans-serif, are difficult to accurately digitize by way of optical character recognition)

=== Deutsche Akademie der Wissenschaften zu Berlin, Druckhaus "Maxim Gorki", Altenburg ===
- Deutsches Jahrbuch für Volkskunde (academic periodical)
  Wilhelm Fraenger (1890–1964) (ed. 1955–1964)
  Hermann Strobach (de) (born 1925) (ed.; 1965–1969)
  Published by the Instutut für Deutsche Volkskunde (Institute for German Folklore) and the German Academy of Sciences at Berlin

1955 (Vol. 1) thru 1969 (Vol. 15), semiannual; ISSN 0012-1312
(all issues can be viewed online via digi.evifa.de/viewer/toc/BV042275036/1/LOG_0000/, sponsored by Deutsche Forschungsgemeinschaft)

== Photo gallery ==
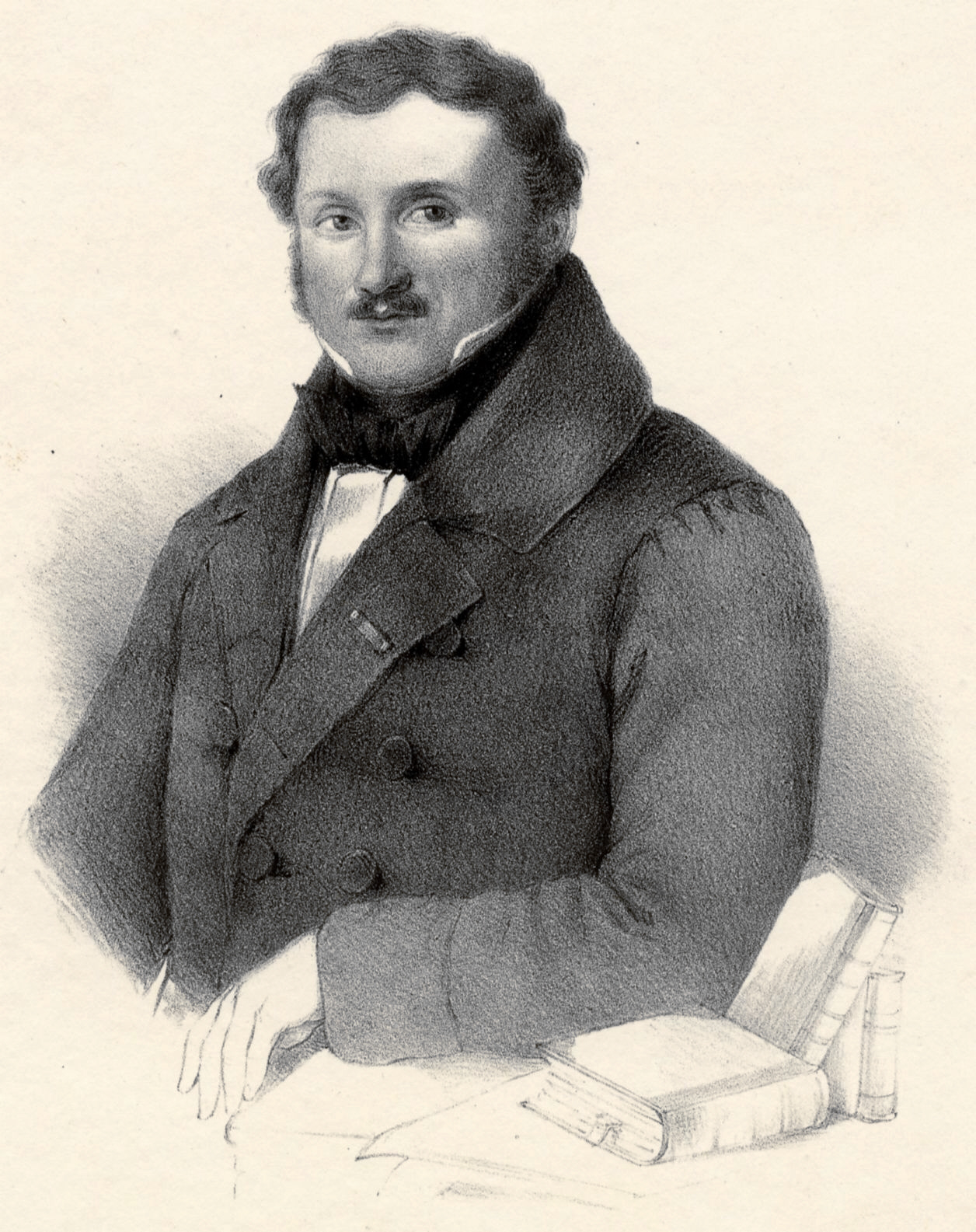
Heinrich August Pierer (c. 1850)
