= Alves Historic District =

Historic district in Kentucky, United States

- U.S. National Register of Historic Places
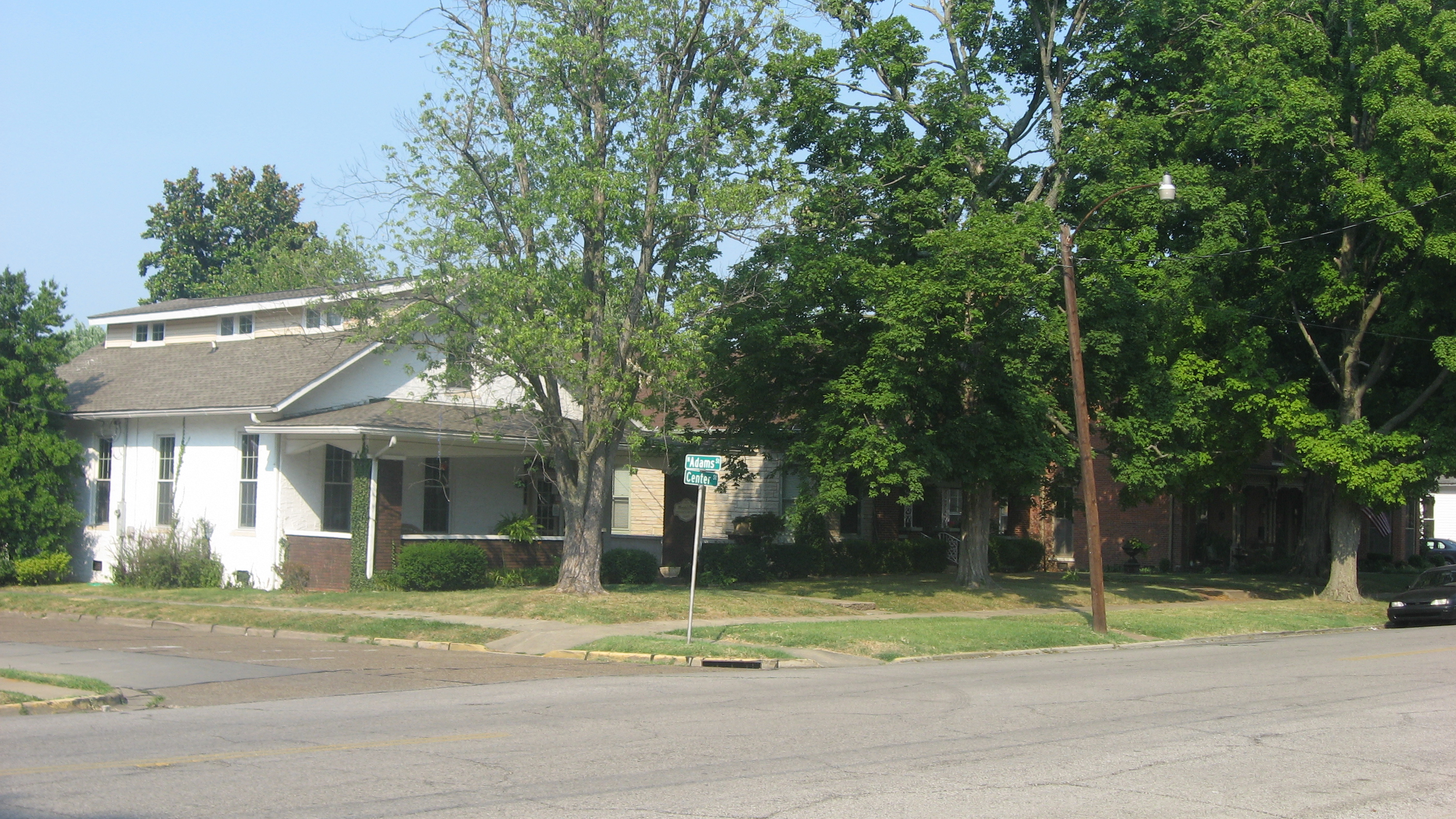

- Location within Kentucky Location within the United States
- Location: Roughly bounded by Green, Center, S. Alvasia, Powell, S. Adams and Washington Sts., Henderson, Kentucky
- Coordinates: 37°50′05″N 87°35′09″W
- Area: 28 acres (11 ha)
- Built: 1865
- Architectural style: Bungalow/craftsman, Late Victorian
- NRHP reference No.: 89001151
- Added to NRHP: September 7, 1989

The Alves Historic District, in Henderson, Kentucky, is a 28 acres (11 ha) historic district which was listed on the National Register of Historic Places in 1989.

The district is roughly bounded by Green, Center, S. Alvasia, Powell, S. Adams and Washington Streets, and included 94 contributing buildings and two contributing structures.

It includes the J. Hawkins Hart House, which is separately listed on the National Register.

It includes Bungalow/craftsman and Late Victorian architecture.
