= Audubon School =

Historic site in Henderson, Kentucky, US

- U.S. National Register of Historic Places
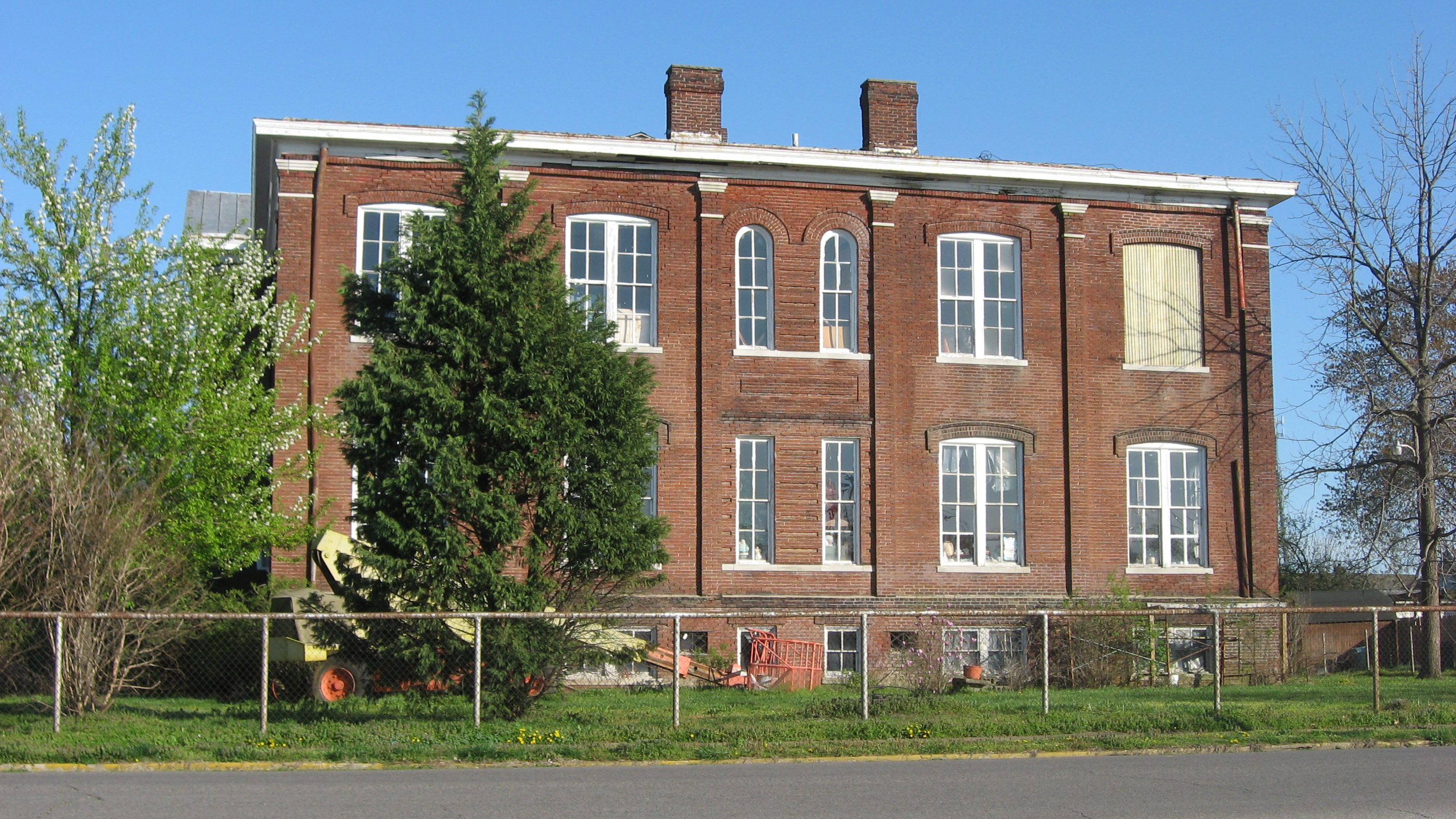
- Western end of school, in 2013

- Location within Kentucky
- Location: 1400 Clay Street, Henderson, Kentucky, U.S.
- Coordinates: 37°49′32″N 87°34′47″W
- Area: 1.3 acres (0.53 ha)
- Built: 1906
- Architect: Spalding Trible
- Architectural style: Late 19th and 20th Century Revivals, Romanesque
- NRHP reference No.: 98001497
- Added to NRHP: December 22, 1998

The Audubon School, at 1400 Clay Street in Henderson, Kentucky, is a historic site that was once an elementary school building, built in 1906, and which served as a school until a boiler explosion caused significant damage in 1976. The school was listed on the National Register of Historic Places in 1998.

There were hopes that it could be renovated for alternative use. However, when a developer seeking to create low-income housing on the site evaluated the structure, it was deemed unsaveable, and the building was demolished in 2019.

== History ==
The Audubon School was a two-story brick building designed by local builder and architect Spalding Trible.

It was the only contributing building on the 1.3 acres (0.53 ha) property; the ballfield and the playground were deemed contributing sites. "The ballfield was enlarged in the 1970s when two homes that faced Shelby Street were purchased by the Board of Education and torn down."

The school was deemed significant as a representative of history of education in Henderson: "Remaining in good condition, the Audubon School, which once played a vital part in the history of Henderson's educational growth and development, is the only surviving school building that represents a time period spanning between 1906 and 1976."

A 1950 local newspaper story was titled, "Every Citizen of Audubon Points With Pride To The Grade School Building"; the article included interviews with 30 persons.

== Closure and modern history ==
The school was closed in 1976 after a boiler explosion. The school educated children who lived in the surrounding residential neighborhood from 1906 until 1976 when the school closed unexpectedly due to structural damage caused by a boiler explosion."

"Demolition work is progressing for the old Audubon School.v/ Developers will be building the new Audubon Senior Apartments on the property where the school was. Developer Henry Olynger, says the finished project will be a three story building with 49 affordable housing units. "Henry Olynger, developer, stated we originally looked into remodeling it into a senior property, but shape, structure, condition it wasn't feasible. Some of the limestone from the front entry was to be reused in the new project to preserve some of the history. Hoped to have new project built in about a year.

It was the best or only school to preserve, in order to represent education in Henderson:

"Of all the early elementary schools constructed in Henderson, only Audubon School had a later addition, a gymnasium and stage in 1928 as confirmed by the 1931 Fire Insurance Sanborn Maps. See Figure 6. Audubon School’s continued existence and use since its closing as an educational facility in 1976 is a direct reflection of the community's interest in preserving a historic building that marks the end of an era in education as well as the school board's decisions to alter school district boundaries and plans for new construction. Several of the schools were replaced including the historic Jefferson Street School in 1963, and the Seventh Street School in 1975. Some schools were abandoned and students redistributed as with the Audubon School, while other schools were relocated such as the Center Street School in 1975. After the Audubon School closed in 1976, it was purchased and occupied by private citizens from 1976 to 1994. Several modifications occurred to the east wall of the gymnasium in 1978 and the ceilings were lowered. As of April 1996, the current owners, Shirley and Pauline Howell, respect the historic building and have retained all of the character defining features such as the beaded board wainscotting and ceilings; chalkboards; pressed tin ceilings, narrow wood floorboards; tall, narrow multilight wood windows; and transoms and doors; in an effort to preserve the building. The Howell's continue to restore the facility and landscape the schoolyard."

In 2012, it was noted that "Goodfellows Spread Christmas Cheer 100 Years Ago", including with some activity at the Audubon School. Times Tribune Newspaper Archives December 24, 2012 Page 17.

The replacement project is named the Audubon School Senior Apartments, it opened in March 2021. City officials hope the new residential community will eventually contribute to the revitalization of the entire East End. "It is hoped that this will be a catalyst for other developments in the area to join the three-residence Habitat for Humanity mini-development just a block down Letcher Street, as well as the East End Park and other improvements made by private property owners," Stinnett said.

The school, though demolished, apparently remains listed, as weekly lists of changes in National Register status have not yet shown a delisting.
