= Barret House (Richmond, Virginia) =

Historic house in Virginia, US

- U.S. National Register of Historic Places
- Virginia Landmarks Register
- Richmond City Historic District
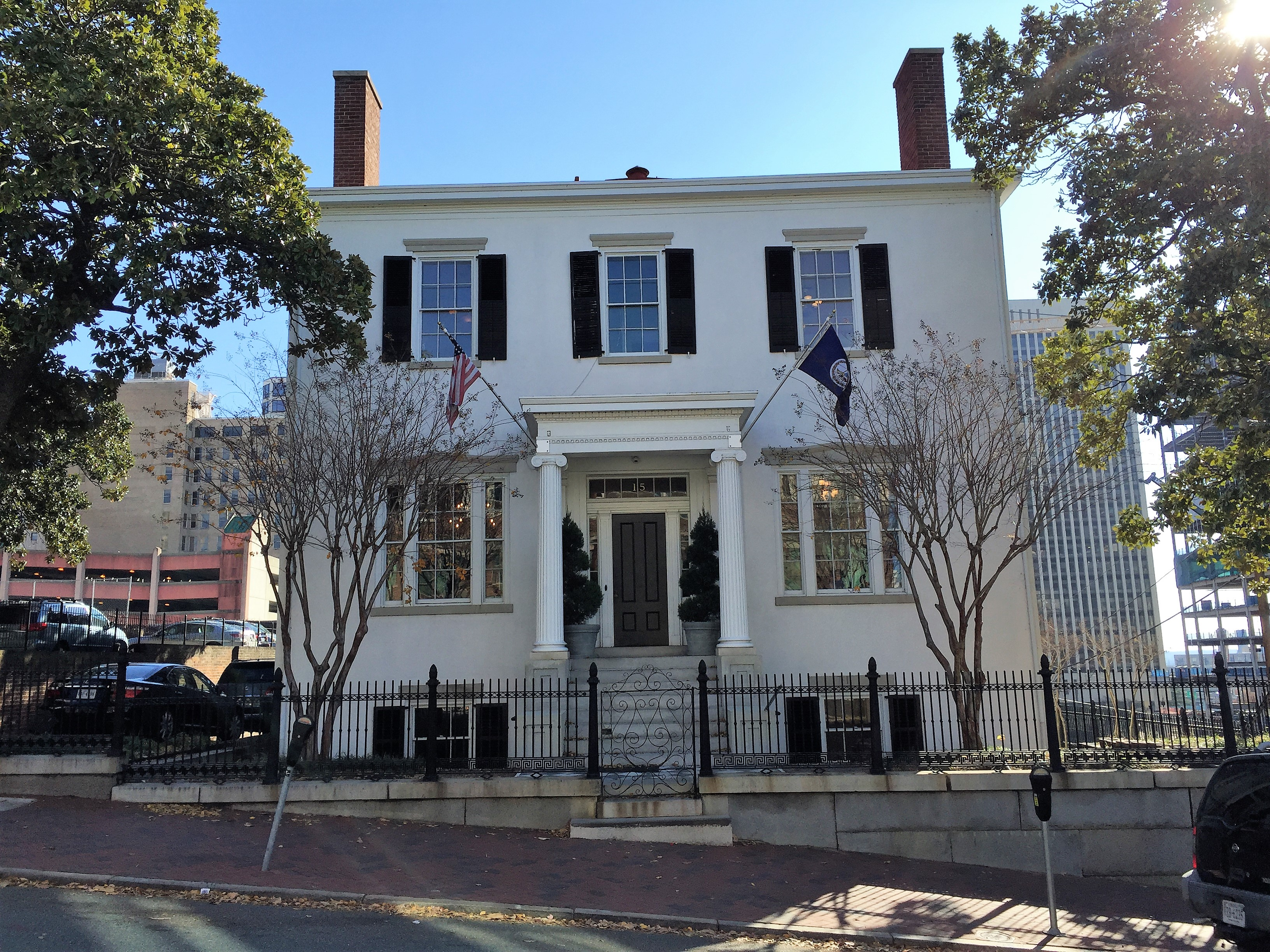
- Barret House in 2017

- Location within Virginia Location within the United States
- Location: 15 South 5th Street, Richmond, Virginia
- Coordinates: 37°32′22″N 77°26′26″W
- Area: 9.9 acres (4.0 ha)
- Built: 1844
- Architectural style: Greek Revival
- NRHP reference No.: 72001517
- VLR No.: 127-0029

Significant dates
- Added to NRHP: February 23, 1972
- Designated VLR: November 16, 1971

The William Barret House, located at 15 South 5th Street, Richmond, Virginia, is a mid-19th-century house, and has been listed on the National Register of Historic Places since 1972.

== History ==
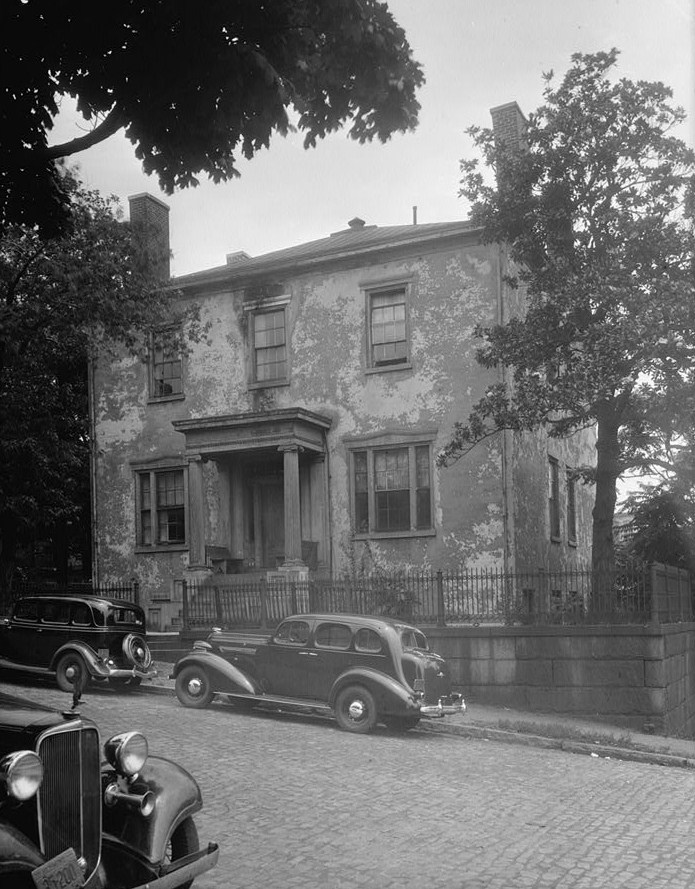
The Barret House, c. 1930s, Library of Congress

William Barret (1786 – 1871), a wealthy tobacconist in antebellum Richmond, built the Classical Revival styled house in 1844 in Richmond's Gambles Hill neighborhood. The house is situated on the southeast corner lot of 5th and Cary Streets. The residence and its dependencies survived the 1865 Richmond evacuation fire at the end of the American Civil War, and remain largely intact today.

Since it ceased use as a private residence, the Barret House has been used by a variety of organizations and for various purposes. The Navy League Club used it as a social club for sailors during the Second World War, and it later served as the offices for the Virginia Society of the American Institute of Architects Virginia Foundation for Architecture (now the Virginia Center for Architecture) and an antique book store — all which relocated in 2005 to Branch House on Monument Avenue.

Since 2009, Barret House has served as the corporate headquarters of Thompson Davis & Company, an asset management firm.
