= Martin Barrett House =

- U.S. National Register of Historic Places
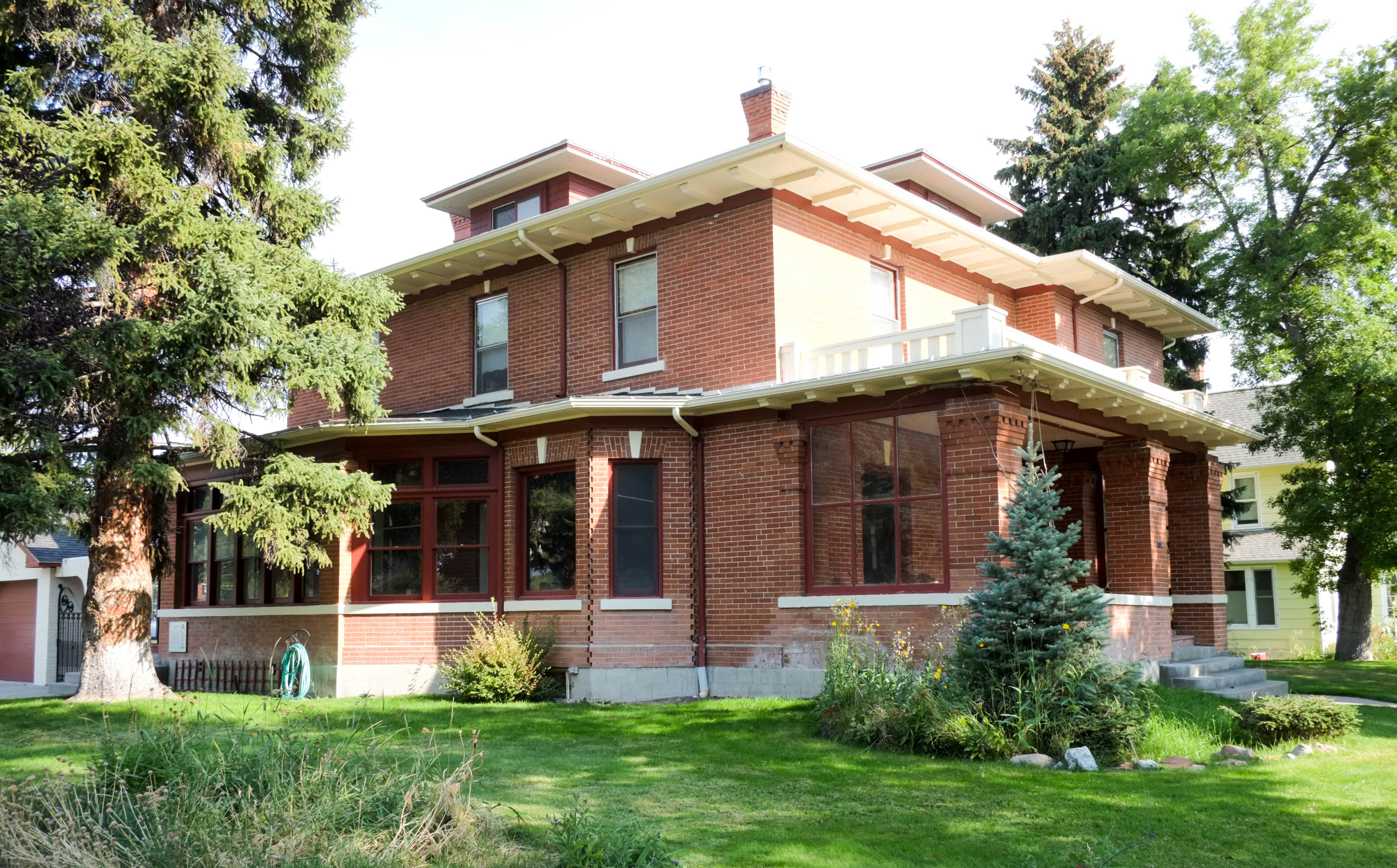

- Location within Montana
- Location: 733 S. Pacific, Dillon, Montana
- Coordinates: 45°12′39″N 112°38′25″W
- Area: less than one acre
- Built: 1912
- Architectural style: Colonial Revival, Prairie School
- NRHP reference No.: 86003675
- Added to NRHP: January 28, 1987

The Martin Barrett House, at 733 S. Pacific in Dillon, Montana, USA, was built in 1912. It was the retirement home of the politician and pioneer rancher Martin Barrett and his wife. It was listed on the National Register of Historic Places in 1987.

The eclectic house shows early 20th century architecture in Dillon. It is a two-story square plan building, with red brick facing over wood frame, which reflects influences of Colonial Revival and Prairie School styles.
