= Richard Barrett House =

- U.S. National Register of Historic Places
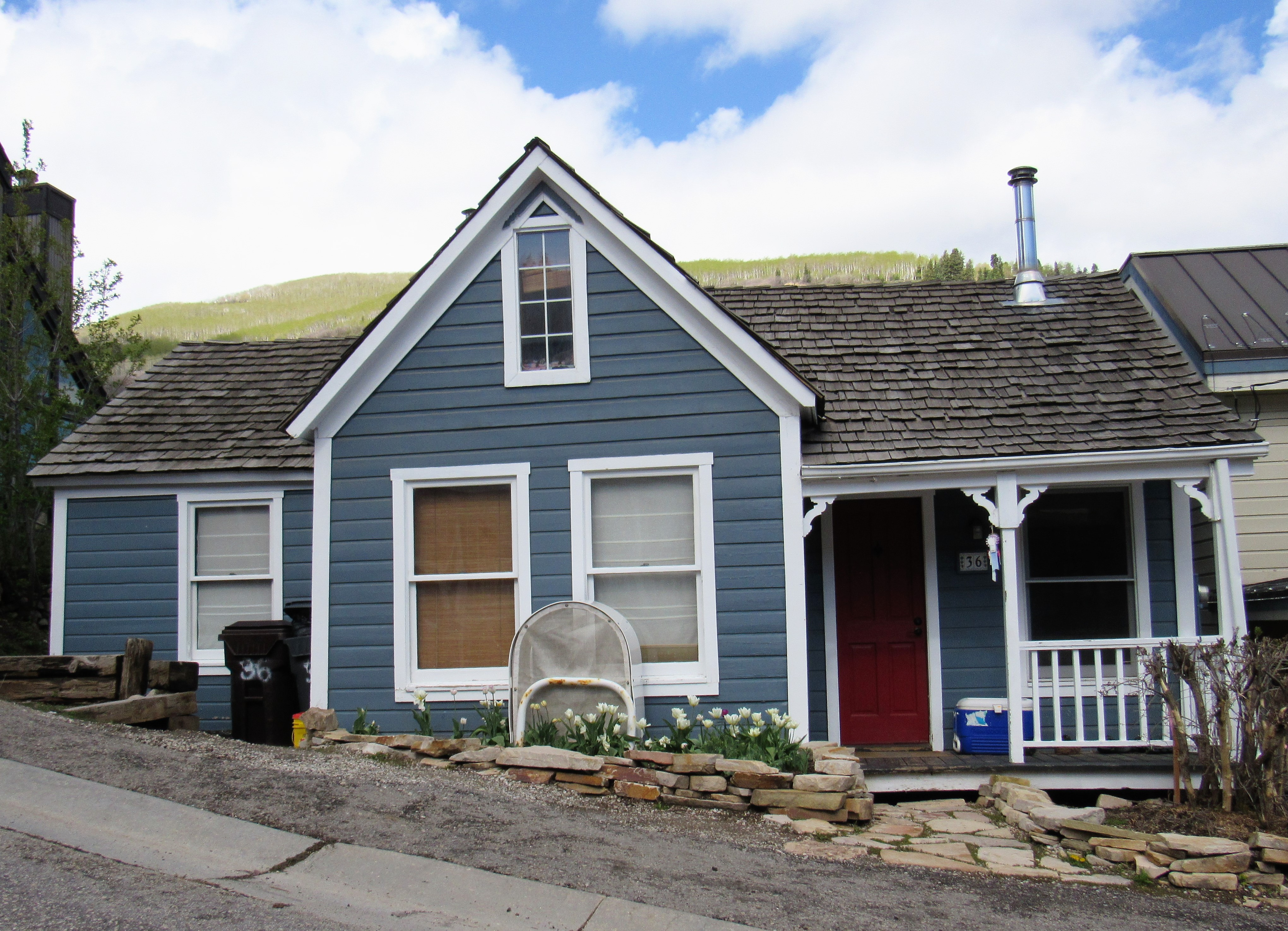

- Location within Utah Location within the United States
- Location: 36 Prospect Ave. Park City, Utah
- Coordinates: 40°38′21″N 111°29′35″W
- Area: less than one acre
- Built: c.1883
- MPS: Mining Boom Era Houses TR
- NRHP reference No.: 84002238
- Added to NRHP: July 11, 1984

The Richard Barrett House, at 36 Prospect Ave. in Park City, Utah, was built in the 1880s. It was listed on the National Register of Historic Places in 1984.

It was deemed

architecturally significant as one of 78 extant T/L cottages in Park City, 17 of which are included in this nomination. The T/L cottage is one of the three most common house types built during the early period of Park City's mining boom era, and significantly contributes to the character of the residential area. This house was built by at least 1889, as indicated by the Sanborn insurance maps, and was probably constructed for Richard and Annie Barrett soon after their arrival in Park City in 1882. Richard Barrett had come from his native England at the age of sixteen in 1866, and worked for a time in the mines of some of the other western states. His wife, Annie, whom he married in Virginia City, Nevada in 1876, was born in Pennsylvania in 1859. She came west with her parents in 1861 and lived in Grass Valley, California prior to her marriage with Richard. They had four children. Both Richard and Annie probably lived in this house until their deaths in 1900 and 1935, respectively. The house remained in the Barrett family until 1966.
