= William Soaper Farm =

- U.S. National Register of Historic Places
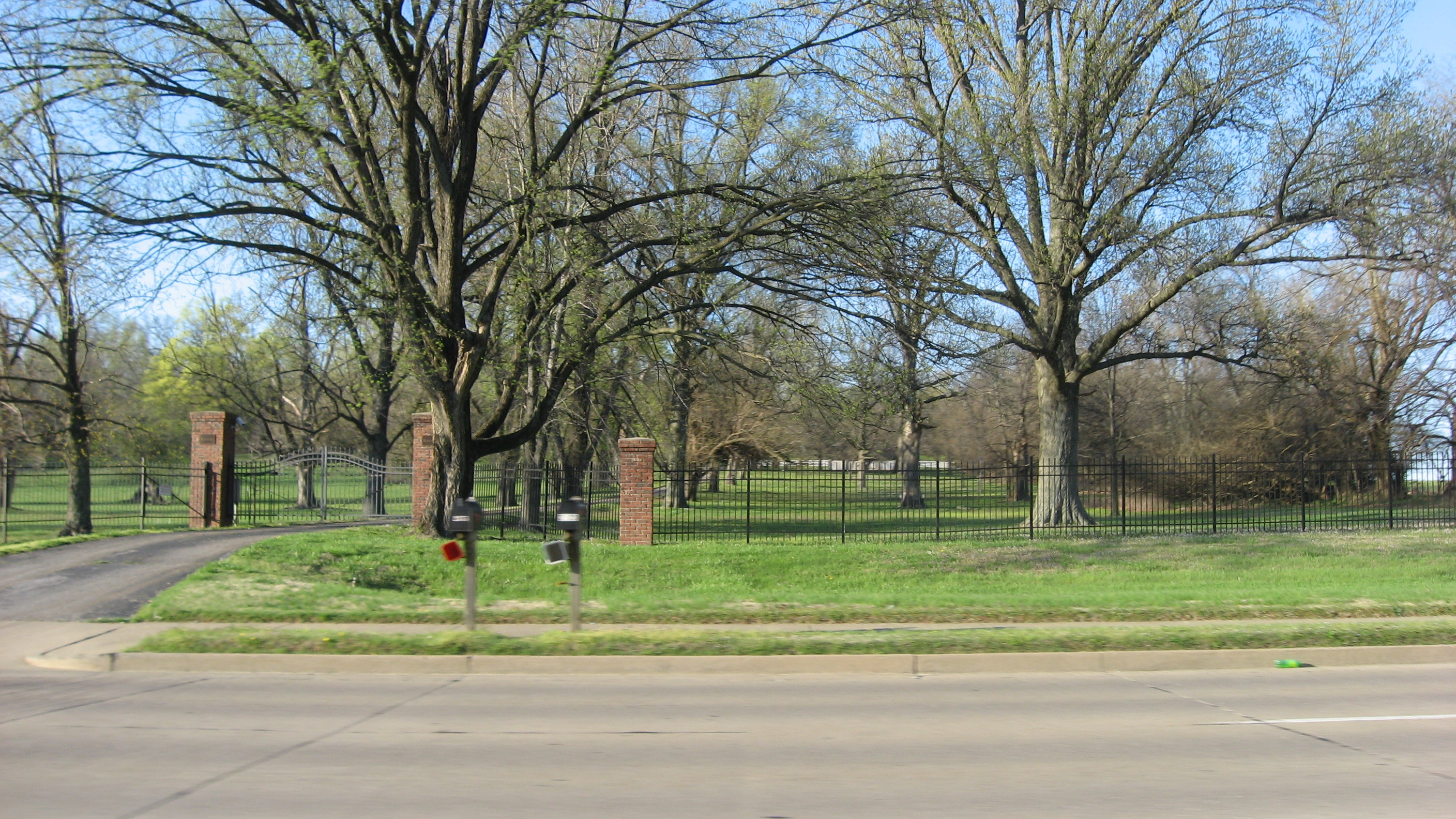
- View of gate to the farm

- Location within Kentucky Location within the United States
- Location: 2323 Zion Rd., Henderson, Kentucky
- Coordinates: 37°49′57″N 87°33′39″W
- Area: 148.5 acres (60.1 ha)
- Built: c.1808, 1834, other
- Architectural style: Greek Revival
- NRHP reference No.: 00001595
- Added to NRHP: January 11, 2001

The William Soaper Farm is a farm in Henderson, Kentucky that was listed on the National Register of Historic Places in 2001.

While the entire farm is about 549 acres (222 ha) in size, the listed area is 148.5 acres (60.1 ha). This area includes 13 contributing buildings, a contributing structure, and a contributing site, as well as two non-contributing buildings.

The buildings include:

- William Soaper Home (c. 1808), built as a log dogtrot building, expanded in 1834 to enclose the dogtrot and to add a second story, converting it into an I-house.
