= Heinrich Pierer =

German lexicographer and publisher (1794-1850)

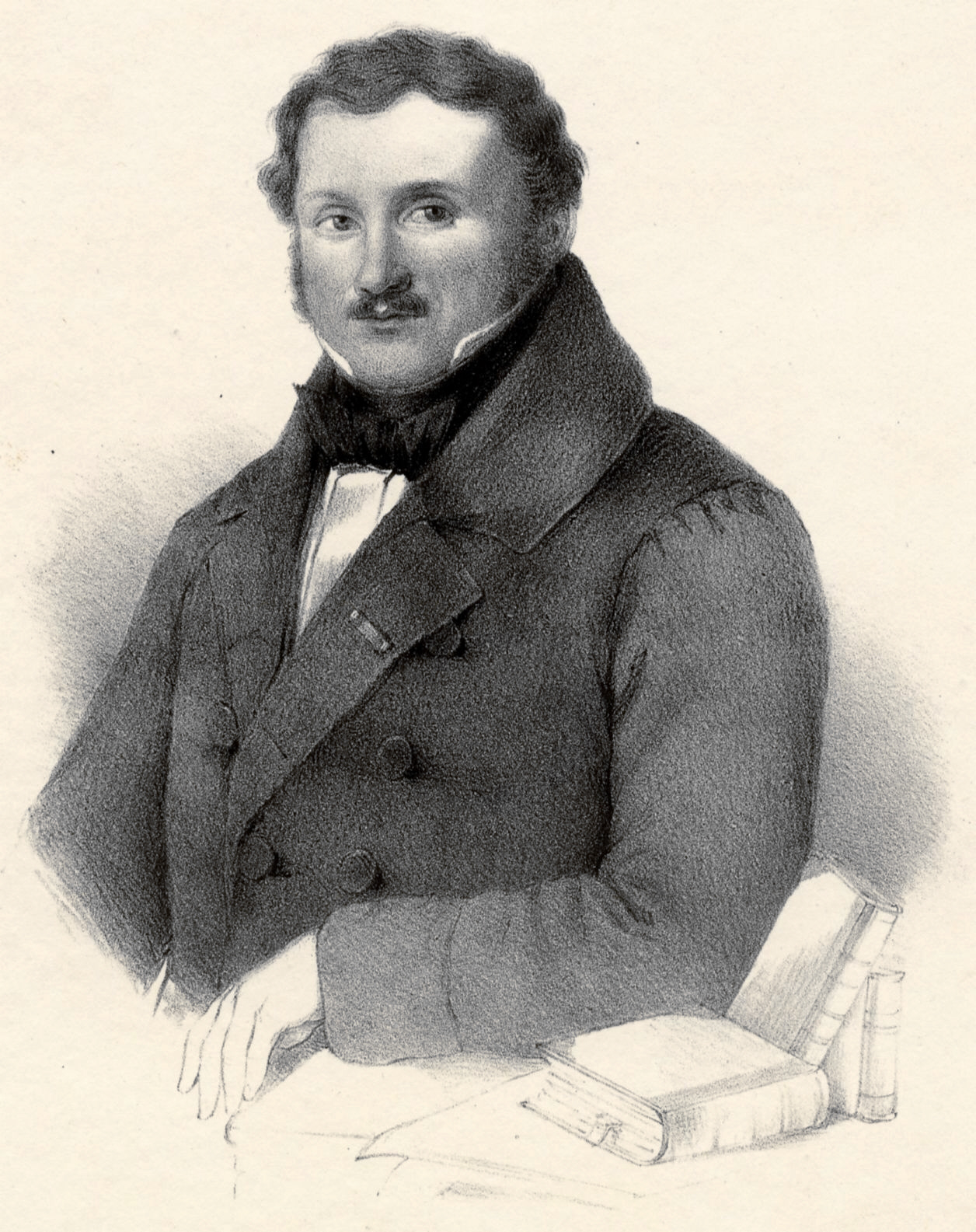
Heinrich August Pierer, c.1850

Heinrich August Pierer (26 February 1794 in Altenburg – 12 May 1850, Altenburg) was a German officer, lexicographer and publisher known particularly for his Universal-Lexikon der Gegenwart und Vergangenheit (Universal Lexicon of the Present and Past), a multi-volume encyclopedic dictionary first published in 1824 as Encyclopädisches Wörterbuch der Wissenschaften, Künste und Gewerbe. Bearbeitet von mehreren Gelehrten (Encyclopedic Dictionary of the Sciences, Arts and Crafts. Edited by several scholars); it is considered "the first full-fledged modern general lexicon" (Gurst 1976).

== Life ==
Pierer was the son of the Altenburg physician, medical writer and publisher Johann Friedrich Pierer (1767–1832); Pierer's father in 1826 became the official physician to Frederick, Duke of Saxe-Altenburg, in 1799 he had purchased the Richter's royal court printing works (Richtersche Hofdruckerei) and in 1801 established his own publishing company Literarisches Comptoir, where he published his medical journal and began with the publication of a large comprehensive medical dictionary. In Altenburg, Pierer's father had sole printer privileges and therefore held a monopoly there (this may also be a reason why Brockhaus moved to Leipzig in 1817).

Pierer was initially educated by a clergyman together with the later General Joseph von Radowitz, then attended the Pforta boarding school and studied medicine at the University of Jena from 1811 to 1813. In the Wars of Liberation, he was a member of the Prussian volunteer unit Lützow Free Corps from 1813 until its dissolution in 1814. He then fought in Yorck's corps in the Prussian Army. In 1813, he took part in the Battle of Leipzig (where he was badly wounded during the storming of Wachau), in 1815 in the Battle of Waterloo.

At the end of the war, Pierer worked for several years as a teacher at the Prussian military divisional school in Posen. In 1820, after his honorable discharge from military service with the rank of major, he became a partner in his father's publishing business Pierer'sche Hofbuchdruckerei. In 1832, he took over his father's business entirely, which from then on operated under the name of H.A. Pierer.

== Pierer's universal lexicon ==
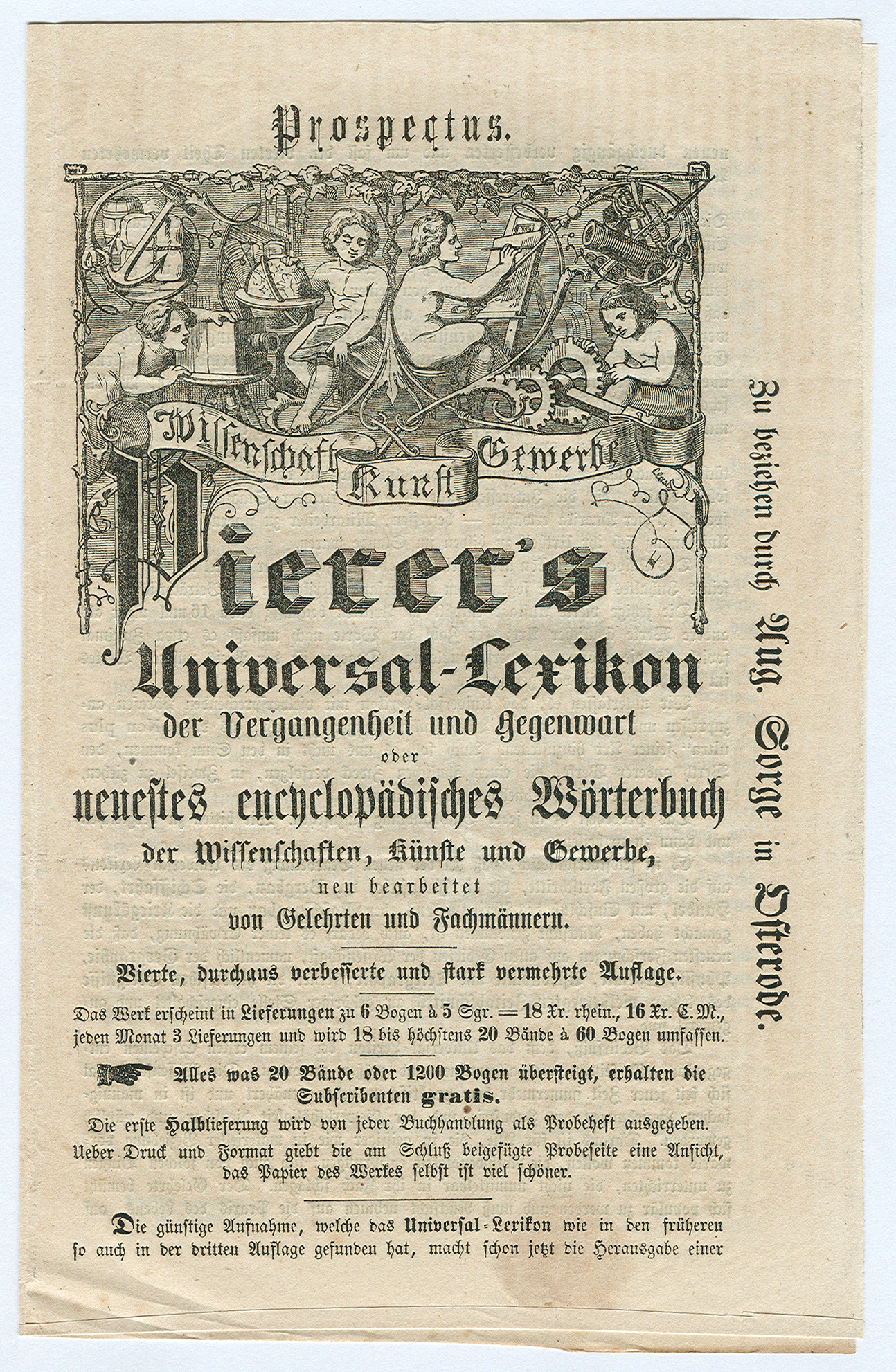
4-page prospectus from 1856 for the 4th edition, distributed by: Bookseller & Publisher August Sorge

Less well known than the three well-known conversation lexicons of the 19th century - Brockhaus, Meyers Konversations-Lexikon and Herders Conversations-Lexikon - is Heinrich A. Pierer's Universal Lexicon of the Present and Past (Universal-Lexikon der Gegenwart und Vergangenheit oder neuestes encyclopädisches Wörterbuch der Wissenschaften, Künste und Gewerbe; Universal Lexicon of the Present and Past or Latest Encyclopedic Dictionary of the Sciences, Arts and Crafts, or in short Pierers Enzyklopädisches Wörterbuch; Pierer's Encyclopedic Dictionary, and lastly Pierers Konversations-Lexikon; Pierer's Conversation Lexicon).

His encyclopedic dictionary went through a number of editions, both during his lifetime and later. It first appeared in 26 volumes between 1824 and 1836 and was continued by the German linguist and theologian Julius Löbe after Pierer's death; More than 220 scholars were involved in creating the second edition, and from volume 16 more than 300 scholars.

Pierer published several updated new editions at short intervals: 1840–1846 (2nd edition in 34 volumes; a total of around 17,000 pages), 1849–1852 (3rd edition in 17 volumes). Löbe initiated a fundamental revision that appeared in 1857–1865 (4th edition in 19 volumes). Another followed in 1867–1873 (5th edition); Löbe was no longer involved in the following edition from 1875–1880 (6th edition in 18 volumes, published by Verlag Adam Spaarmann, Oberhausen und Leipzig, and later by the Literarischen Institut Baruch, Cologne, and then by Verlag J. W. Spemann, Stuttgart). The 7th edition (in 12 volumes) was edited by Joseph Kürschner and shows the translations (only of the terms) in 12 languages for each keyword.

Six supplemental volumes were published for the first time in 1841–1847, 1850–1854 a further six supplement volumes and in 1855 a volume with the latest additions and 1865–1873 three volumes as yearbooks as additions and updates. In addition, a volume of illustrations with 2,500 illustrations on 67 lithographic plates was published in 1848.

=== Reception and impact ===
Although largely forgotten today, the work was highly valued by contemporaries; contemporary critics wrote that Pierer's work was "the richest conversational encyclopedia, which presents the facts with a completeness that can only be expected, and is therefore an extremely useful handbook for everyone to look up" (Gustav Schwab and Karl Klüpfel).

Pierer's Universal Lexicon served as a model for the "Das Grosse Conversations-Lexikon für die gebildeten Stände" (Great encyclopedia for the educated classes) (1840-1855). In 1848, Pierer complained that Joseph Meyer had

copied our work throughout the layout [...] by using our plan, our register, he saved himself precisely the most laborious and difficult part of the layout.

— Foreword to the 2nd edition

Karl May and Arno Schmidt made extensive use of Pierer's universal lexicon as a source of information. May's "knowledge of foreign languages" goes back, among other things, to the language articles. The Prussian Field Marshal Helmuth von Moltke the Elder was also one of the prominent users of the reference work (the lexicon can still be seen in his study and death room).

== Complete digital edition of the work ==
A complete digital edition of the 4th edition (1857-1865) was published as a DVD-ROM by Directmedia Publishing, Berlin under ISBN 3-89853-515-0 as Volume 115 of the Digital Library. This includes a facsimile representation of the original edition and enables full-text searches. The complete edition is also available on the zeno.org library platform.
