= J. Hawkins Hart House =

- U.S. National Register of Historic Places
- U.S. Historic district – Contributing property
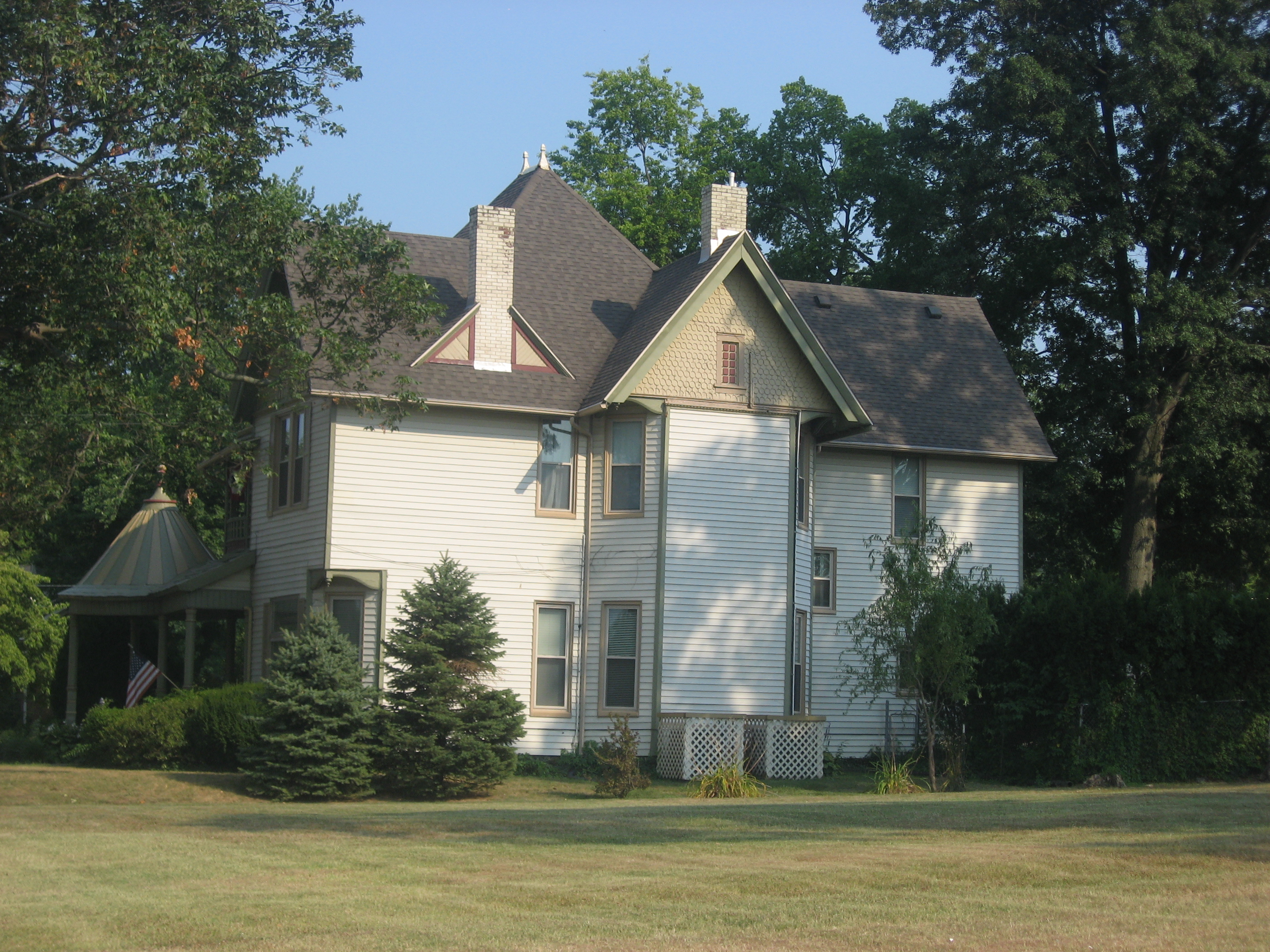
- Side of house, plain, not showing Queen Anne details characteristic of the architect's work

- Location within Kentucky Location within the United States
- Location: 630 Center St., Henderson, Kentucky
- Coordinates: 37°50′06″N 87°35′11″W
- Built: 1892
- Architect: George Franklin Barber
- Architectural style: Queen Anne
- Part of: Alves Historic District (ID89001151)
- NRHP reference No.: 11000005

Significant dates
- Added to NRHP: February 11, 2011
- Designated CP: September 7, 1989

The J. Hawkins Hart House, at 630 Center St. in Henderson, Kentucky, is a Queen Anne-style house which was built in 1892. It was listed on the National Register of Historic Places in 2011.

It is believed to have been built to a design by architect George Franklin Barber.

It was described in the Kaintuckean as

Built in 1892 as a domestic single family dwelling in the Queen Anne style for [J. Hawkins] Hart who began his political career in the City as a court clerk. While living in the house, he would become a county judge, a city commissioner, have a private legal practice, and own his own real estate and insurance business. After the house passed out of the Hart family, it belonged to a succession of middle- to upper-class citizens of the town, including prominent doctors and businessmen. It has remained a single family dwelling throughout. There is strong evidence that the house was designed by the popular mail order architect, George F. Barber, whose designs helped disseminate the Queen Anne style throughout the United States in the late-19th century. The house exhibits numerous hallmarks of Barber design and is an excellent example of Queen Anne architecture in the city. Its architectural significance is interpreted within the historic context, “George F. Barber and Queen Anne Style in Henderson, Kentucky.” The house’s scale, ornamentation, and location give important cues to post-Civil War socioeconomic development in Henderson.

It is also a contributing building in the Alves Historic District, which was listed on the National Register.
