= Carl Geibel =

Hungarian-born German book dealer and publisher (1842–1910)

Carl Geibel (né Carl Stephan Franz; 19 May 1842 – 5 June 1910) was a Hungarian-born German book dealer and publisher. He built up Duncker & Humblot, the Leipzig based publisher of the Allgemeine Deutsche Biographie (General German Biography), a 56 volume German dictionary of national biography covering approximately 26,500 notable German and Dutch people who died before 1900.

== Life ==
=== Family ===
Carl Stephan Franz Geibel was born in Pest (today the central part of Budapest) where his parents were living in connection with his father's business. He was the eldest of his parents' four recorded sons. His father, Friedrich Wilhelm Carl Geibel (1806-1884), was also a successful book dealer and publisher. Carl Geibel, the father, came originally from Halle. The mother, born Leonore Weisz, had been born in 1820 in Szeged, a city to the south of Budapest. His brother, Stephan Geibel (1847–1903), was the Managing Director of Pierer'sche Hofbuchdruckerei. Stephan Geibel & Co., a book publisher based in Altenburg. Carl Geibel and his father were both investors in the Altenburg publisher.

Carl Geibel (1842-1910) married Mathilde Baumgarten in 1870: she came from a family of prosperous Leipzig lawyers. This marriage, too, produced four recorded sons.

=== Education ===
The family lived in Pest till 1850, by which time Carl Geibel (1842-1910) had become fluent in Hungarian. After that, again in connection with his father's business activities, they moved to Leipzig. He attended St. Thomas School and then, between 1855 and 1858, the Ausfeld educational establishment in Schnepfenthal. After this he embarked on an apprenticeship in the book trade, initially with the pioneering book dealer Friedrich Volckmar.

=== Publishing ===
He moved on to work successively in Gotha, Dorpat (as it was known at that time) and Budapest. In 1866, with his father, he took over the Berlin publishing firm of Duncker & Humblot which they immediately relocated to Leipzig.

In 1874 his father fell seriously ill with lung disease and had to spend his winters at a cure resort on the Riviera. After a few years he recovered up to a point, and lived for another ten years, actively involved in the business. Nevertheless, from 1874 it was the son who was taking the lead role in running the business. During the final decades of the nineteenth century Duncker & Humblot, like many German publishing firms, grew strongly, focusing in subjects such as law and social sciences, and becoming one of the empire's leading academic publishers.

In 1872 Carl Geibel was a founder member of the Verein für Socialpolitik ("Social Policy Society").

== Recognition ==
The Law faculty at Leipzig University awarded Geibel an honorary doctorate in 1902 in appreciation of Duncker & Humblot's contribution as academic and legal publishers.
