= Everett P. Barrett House =

Historic house in Wisconsin, United States

- U.S. National Register of Historic Places
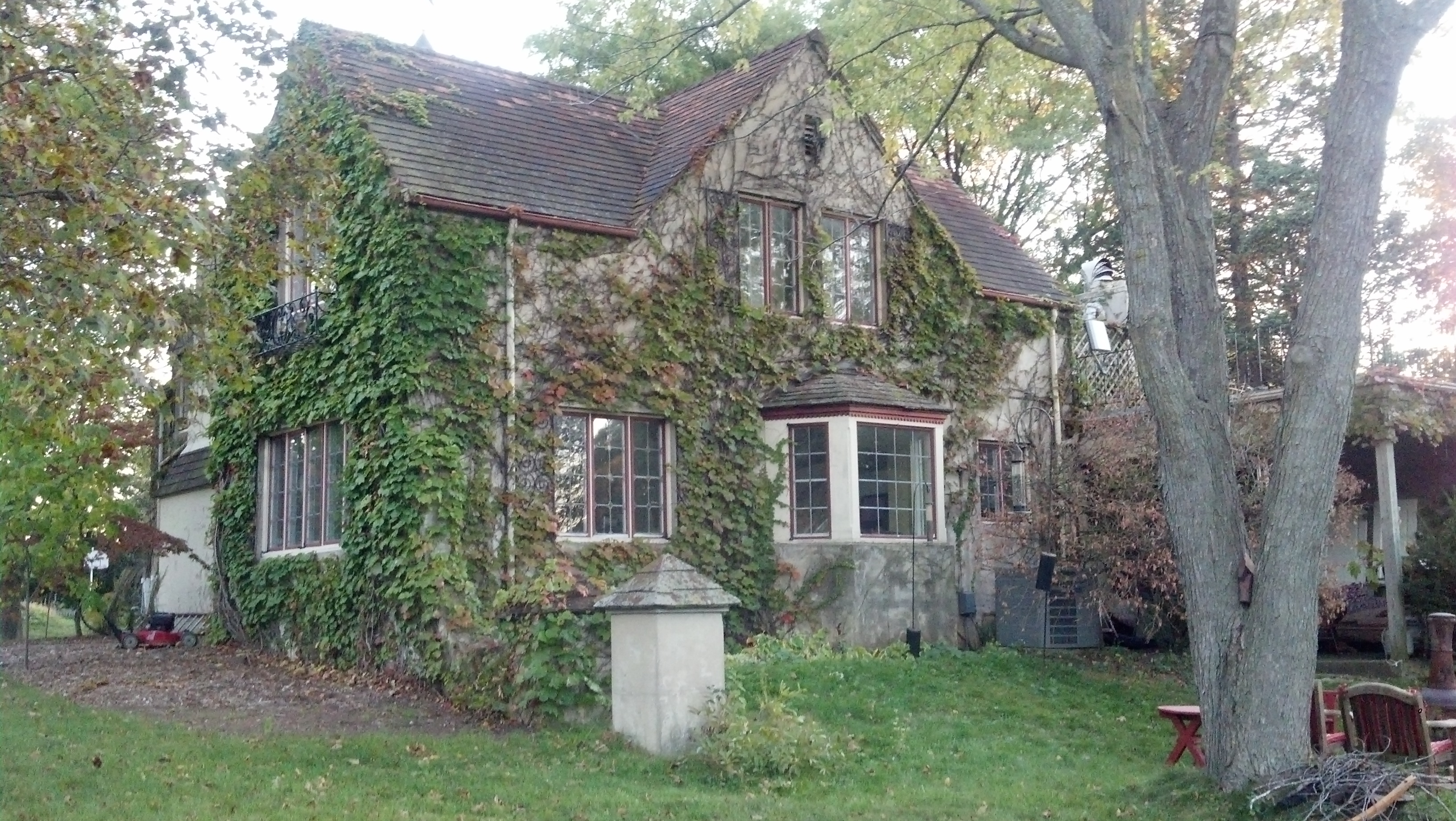

- Location within Wisconsin Location within the United States
- Location: 120 S. Porter Ave. Waukesha, Wisconsin
- Coordinates: 43°00′8″N 88°12′43″W
- Area: less than one acre
- Built: 1940
- Built by: Cayll & Barrett
- Architect: Steffen, R. O.
- Architectural style: Late 19th and 20th Century Revivals
- NRHP reference No.: 95000140
- Added to NRHP: February 24, 1995

The Everett P. Barrett House is a historic house located at 120 South Porter Avenue in Waukesha, Wisconsin. It was added to the National Register of Historic Places in 1995.

It is "an excellent French Normandy style single-family residence that was constructed almost entirely out of reinforced concrete for Everett P. Barrett, an engineer and prominent Waukesha cement contractor whose firm - Cayll and Barrett - built the house in 1940. This irregular plan house was designed by R. O. Steffen and it also incorporates a large turreted garage that is attached to it by an enclosed breezeway. A turret tower is also prominently featured on the main east-facing facade of the 'T'-plan main block of the house, which is one-and-a-half stories in height and measures approximately 42-feet-wide by 50-feet-deep."
