= Randolph Columbus Barrett House =

Historic house in Missouri, United States

- U.S. National Register of Historic Places
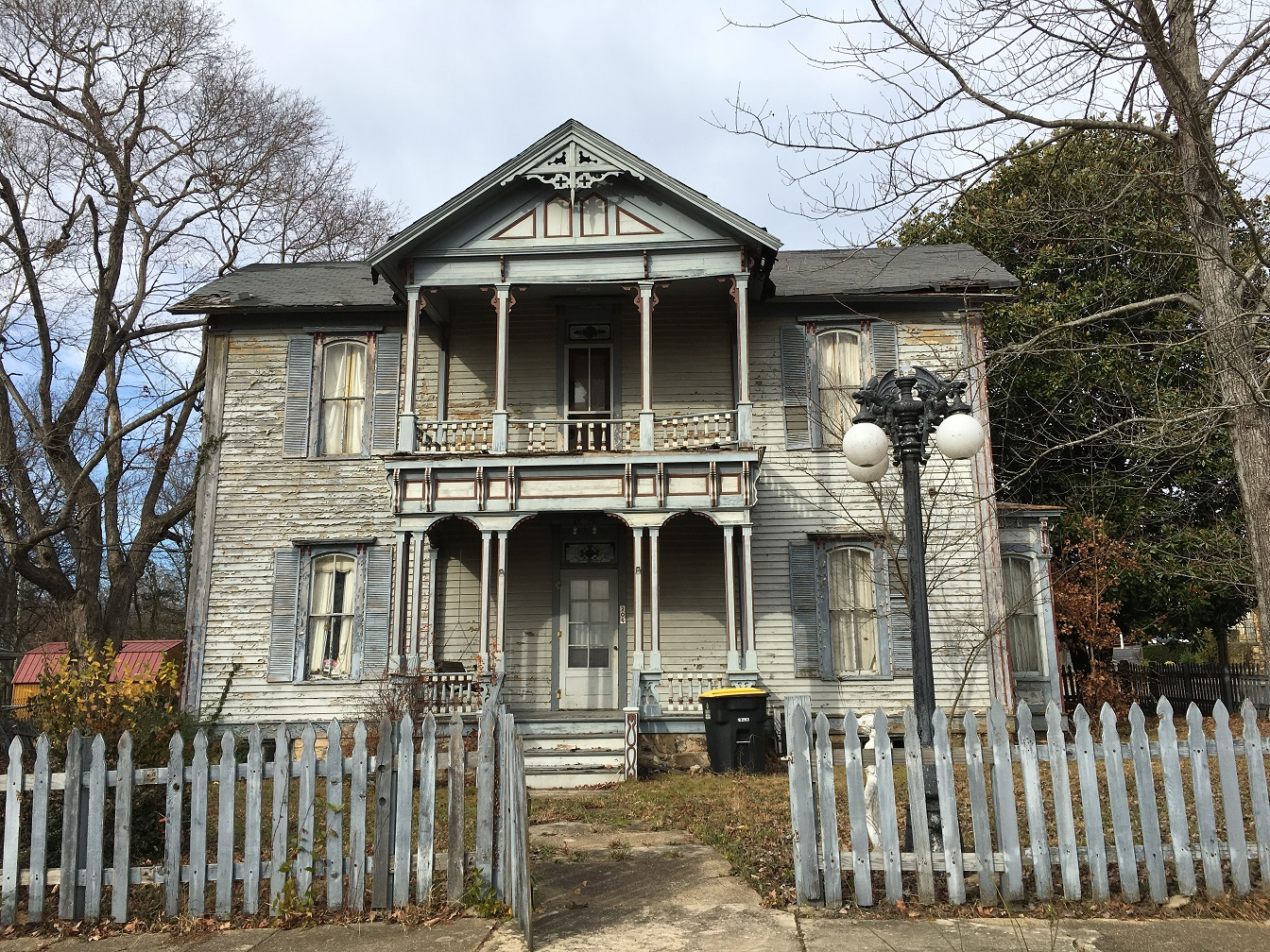

- Location within Missouri Location within the United States
- Location: 209 Plum St. Doniphan, Missouri
- Coordinates: 36°37′17″N 90°49′25″W
- Area: less than one acre
- Built: 1881
- Architectural style: Classical Revival
- NRHP reference No.: 76001115
- Added to NRHP: November 7, 1976

Randolph Columbus Barrett House is a historic home located at Doniphan, Ripley County, Missouri. It was built in 1881, and is a two-story, three-bay, "T"-plan, frame dwelling with Classical Revival style design influences. It has a two-story front portico with rails at both levels, bracketed cornice and coupled posts, a semi-octagonal bay with bracketed cornice, and a two-story side gallery porch on the side of the rear wing.

It was added to the National Register of Historic Places in 1976.
