= St. Paul's Episcopal Church (Henderson, Kentucky) =

Historic church in Kentucky, United States

- U.S. National Register of Historic Places
- U.S. Historic district – Contributing property
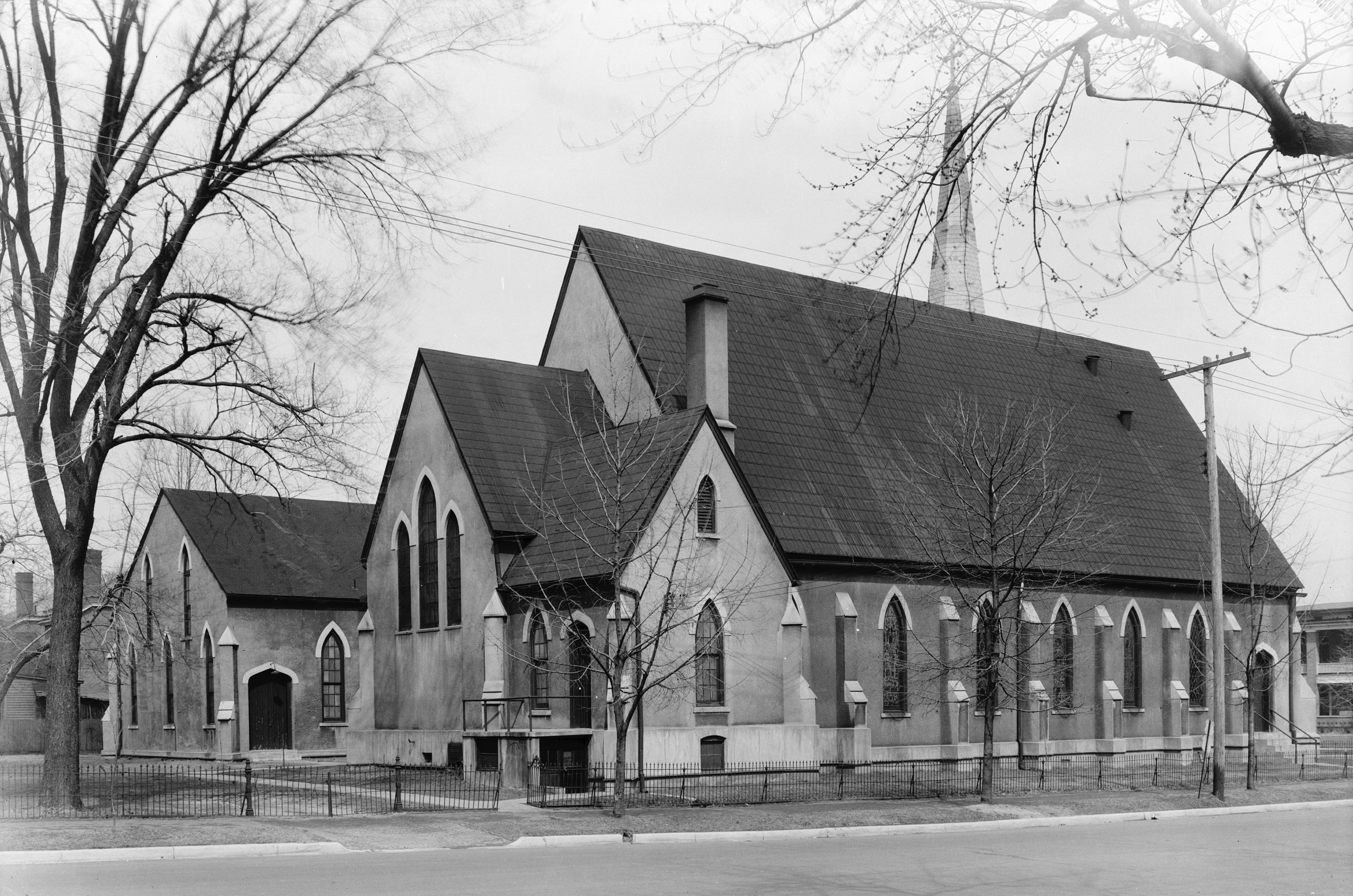

- Location within Kentucky Location within the United States
- Location: 338 Center St., Henderson, Kentucky
- Coordinates: 37°50′13″N 87°35′25″W
- Area: 0.5 acres (0.20 ha)
- Built: 1859-60
- Architect: Bishop Benjamin Bosworth Smith
- Architectural style: Gothic Revival
- Part of: South Main and South Elm Streets Historic District (ID92000500)
- NRHP reference No.: 78001341

Significant dates
- Added to NRHP: October 19, 1978
- Designated: May 11, 1992

The St. Paul's Episcopal Church in Henderson, Kentucky is a historic church at 5 South Green Street. It was built in 1859-60 and added to the National Register of Historic Places in 1978.

It was described in its National Registration as "architecturally significant in being a chaste yet tasteful example of the universal adaption of the Gothic Revival by Anglican churches throughout the latter half of the nineteenth century."

It is a contributing property in the National Register-listed South Main and South Elm Streets Historic District.
