= Henderson Commercial District (Henderson, Kentucky) =

Historic district in Kentucky, United States

- U.S. National Register of Historic Places
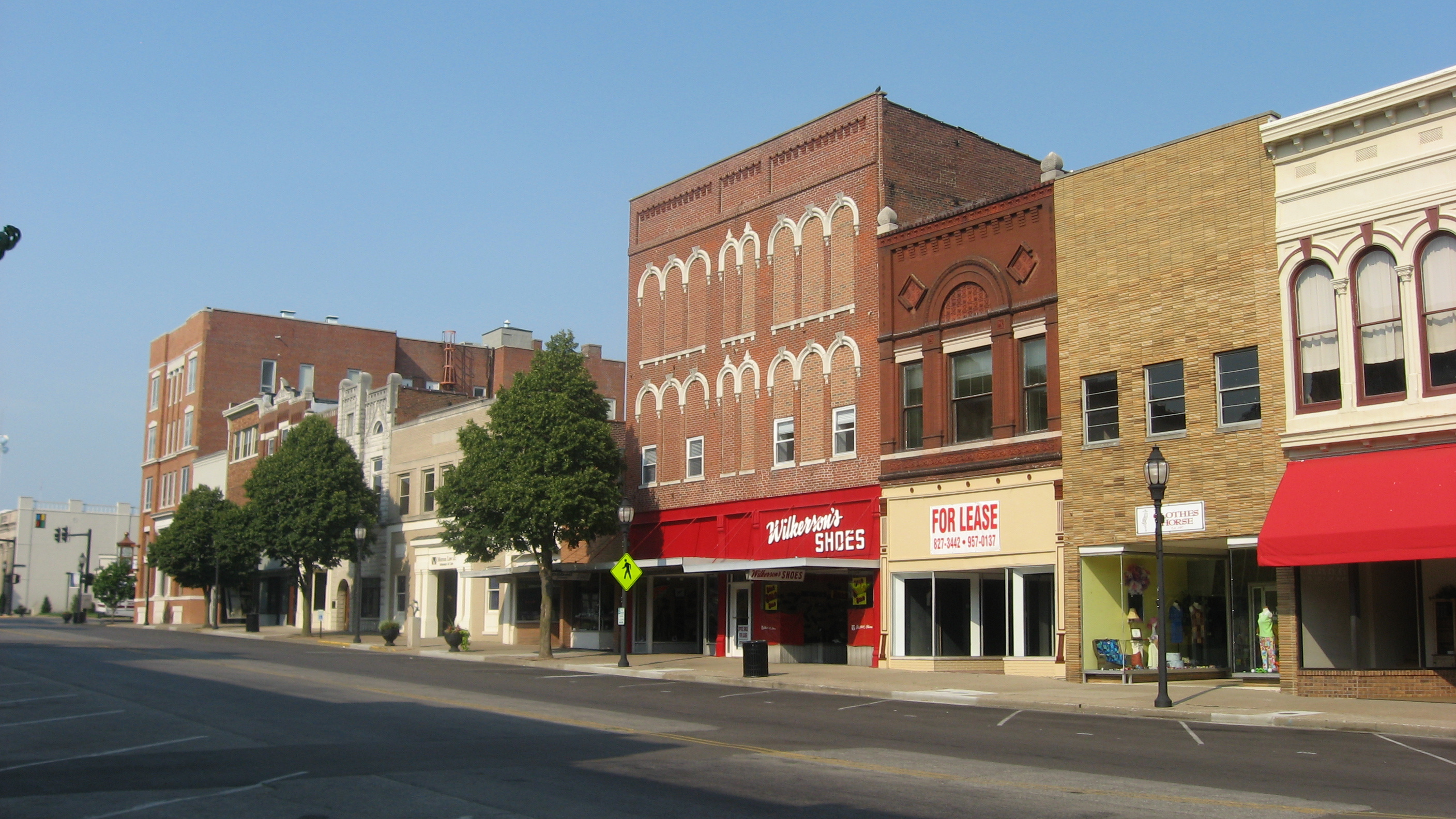

- Location within Kentucky Location within the United States
- Location: Roughly bounded by Main, Third, Elm, and First Sts., Henderson, Kentucky
- Coordinates: 37°50′24″N 87°35′27″W
- Area: 19 acres (7.7 ha)
- Built: 1865
- Architectural style: Classical Revival, Italianate, Romanesque
- NRHP reference No.: 89001975
- Added to NRHP: November 13, 1989

The Henderson Commercial District, in Henderson, Kentucky, was listed on the National Register of Historic Places in 1989. The listing included 69 contributing buildings.

The district is roughly bounded by Main, Third, Elm, and First Streets.
