= Geibel House =

- U.S. National Register of Historic Places
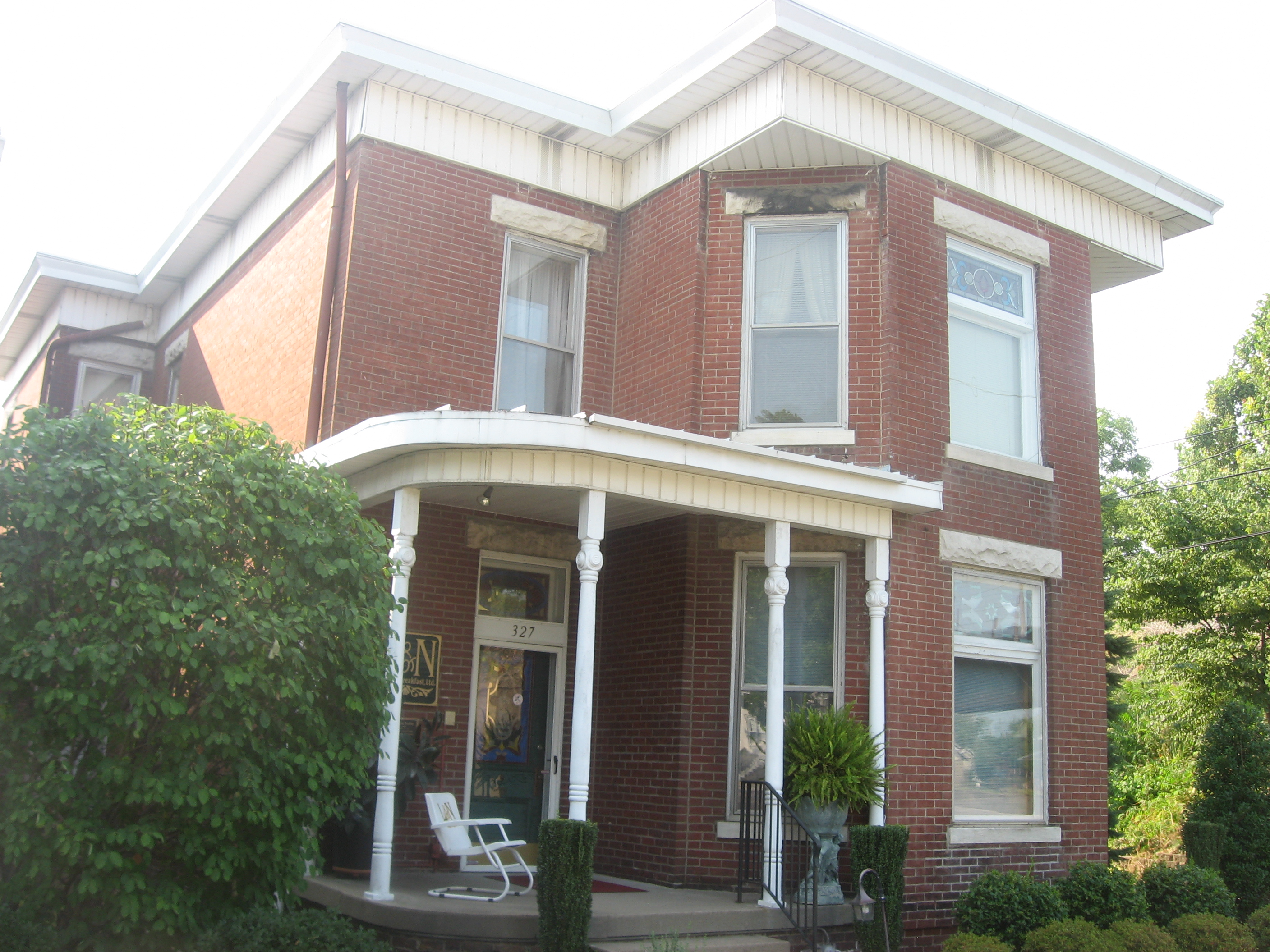

- Location within Kentucky Location within the United States
- Interactive map showing the location of Geibel House
- Location: 327 N. Main St., Henderson, Kentucky
- Coordinates: 37°50′34″N 87°35′26″W 327 N. Main St. 37°50′34″N 87°35′26″W
- Area: 0.2 acres (0.081 ha)
- Built: 1896
- Architectural style: Italianate
- NRHP reference No.: 98001491
- Added to NRHP: December 10, 1998

The Geibel House at 327 N. Main St. in Henderson, Kentucky, was built in 1896. It has also been known as L & N Bed and Breakfast. It was listed on the National Register of Historic Places in 1998.

The building is Italianate in style.
