= Barret House (Henderson, Kentucky) =

Historic house in Kentucky, United States

- U.S. National Register of Historic Places
- U.S. Historic district – Contributing property
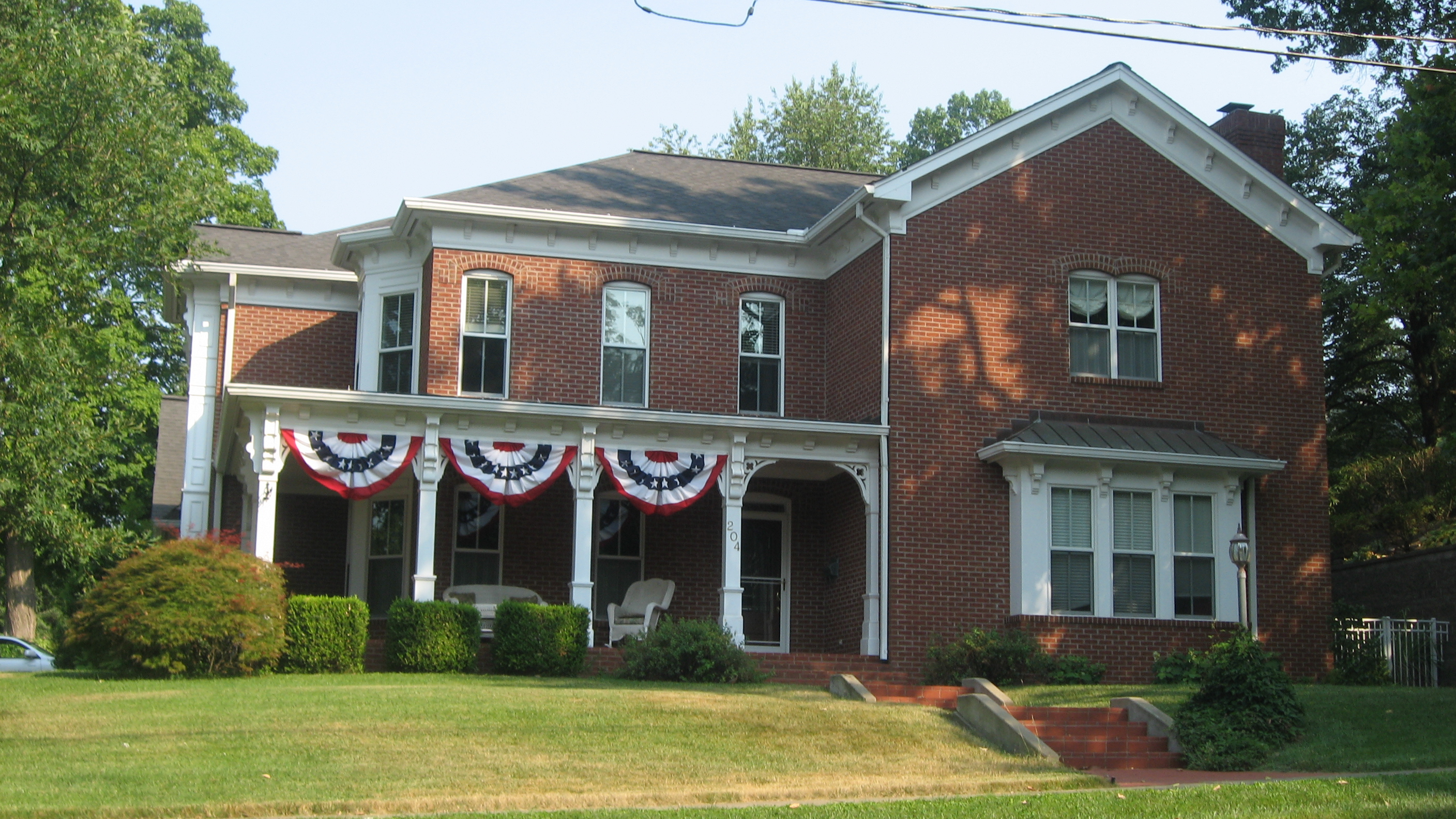

- Location within Kentucky Location within the United States
- Location: 204 S. Elm St., Henderson, Kentucky
- Coordinates: 37°50′08″N 87°35′36″W
- Area: 1 acre (0.40 ha)
- Built: c.1868
- Architectural style: Italianate
- Part of: South Main and South Elm Streets Historic District (ID92000500)
- NRHP reference No.: 78001340

Significant dates
- Added to NRHP: January 5, 1978
- Designated CP: May 11, 1992

The Barret House, at 204 S. Elm St. in Henderson, Kentucky, was built in c.1868. It was listed on the National Register of Historic Places in 1978.

It is an "imposing Italianate villa" built for William T. Barret, a successful tobacconist.

It is a contributing building in the South Main and South Elm Streets Historic District, which was listed on the National Register in 1992.
