= Georgia's 160th House of Representatives district =

State district in Georgia, USA

Georgia's 160th State House of Representatives district
Representative
Lehman Franklin; R–Statesboro
- Demographics: 70.8% White; 22.1% Black; 3.3% Hispanic; 1.7% Asian
- Population: 55,792

District 160 elects one member of the Georgia House of Representatives. It contains parts of Bryan County and Bulloch County.

== Members ==
- Jan Tankersley (2013–2023)
- Lehman Franklin (since 2023)
