= WQTS =

- Statesboro, Georgia; United States
- Frequency: 102.9 MHz
- Branding: The Life FM 102.9

Programming
- Format: Southern Gospel
- Network: The Life FM

Ownership
- Owner: The Power Foundation

History
- Former call signs: WUUF (1988–1995); WPMX (1995–2018); WHKN (2018)

Technical information
- Licensing authority: FCC
- Facility ID: 51398
- Class: C3
- ERP: 25,000 watts
- HAAT: 100.0 meters
- Transmitter coordinates: 32°26′43.00″N 81°58′7.00″W

Links
- Public license information: Public file; LMS
- Webcast: Listen Live
- Website: thelifefm.com/georgia/

WQTS (102.9 FM) is a radio station broadcasting a southern gospel format from The Life FM network. Licensed to Statesboro, Georgia, United States, the station is currently owned by The Power Foundation.

== History ==
The station went on the air as WUUF on 1988-03-24. On 1995-08-06, the station changed its call sign to WPMX.

WPMX swapped call signs with sister station WHKN on August 9, 2018, and then changed call signs again on August 28, 2018, to the current WQTS. This came after Neal Ardman, owner of Radio Statesboro, Inc., sold the facility to the Power Foundation, owner of The Life FM, for $150,000.
