= Mill Creek Recreational Park =

Protected area in Bulloch County, Georgia

Coordinates: 32°27′13″N 81°44′20″W

Mill Creek Recreational Park is a park facility located in Statesboro, Georgia. A joint project of the city of Statesboro and Bulloch County, the park was designed by the landscape architecture firm of Lose & Associates.

== Facility ==
The park contains a number of sports facilities, including fifteen baseball/softball fields, with dugouts, spectator seating, water fountains, and concessions. Twelve of the fields are lighted. There are also seven soccer/football fields, of which four are lighted. Special events and sporting events are scheduled throughout the year. The 155 acres of parkland has a lake in addition to two playgrounds and a 1.25 mile walking trail. Group gatherings are accommodated at nine picnic pavilions. There are eight public restrooms on the grounds. Admission to the park is free. Adjacent parking facilities are also free. The park is open from sunrise to sunset.

The park is located adjacent to Splash in the Boro.
