= Bulloch County School District =

School district in Georgia (U.S. state)

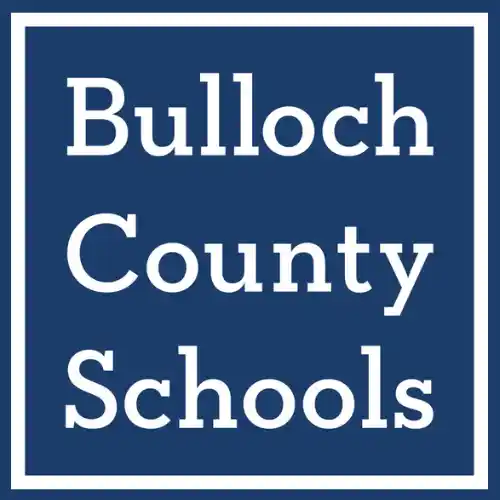

Address
- 150 Williams Road, Suite A Statesboro, Georgia, 30458; United States
- Coordinates: 32.459828°N 81.799035°W

District information
- Grades: Pre-kindergarten - 12
- Superintendent: Richard Smith, interim

Students and staff
- Enrollment: 10,999
- Faculty: 768.90 (FTE)
- Student–teacher ratio: 14.3

Other information
- Accreditation: Southern Association of Colleges and Schools; Georgia Accrediting Commission
- Telephone: (912) 212-8500
- Fax: (912) 212-8529
- Website: bulloch.k12.ga.us

The Bulloch County School District is a public school district in Bulloch County, Georgia, United States, based in Statesboro. It serves the communities of Brooklet, Hopeulikit, Portal, Register, and Statesboro.

== Schools ==
The Bulloch County School District has nine elementary schools, four middle schools, and three high schools.

=== Elementary schools ===
- Brooklet Elementary School
- Julia P. Bryant Elementary School
- Langston Chapel Elementary School
- Mattie Lively Elementary School
- Mill Creek Elementary School
- Nevils Elementary School
- Portal Elementary School
- Sallie Zetterower Elementary School
- Stilson Elementary School

=== Middle schools ===
- Langston Chapel Middle School
- Portal Middle/High School
- Southeast Bulloch Middle School
- William James Middle School

=== High schools ===
- Portal Middle/High School
- Southeast Bulloch High School
- Statesboro High School
