= Lehman Franklin =

American politician

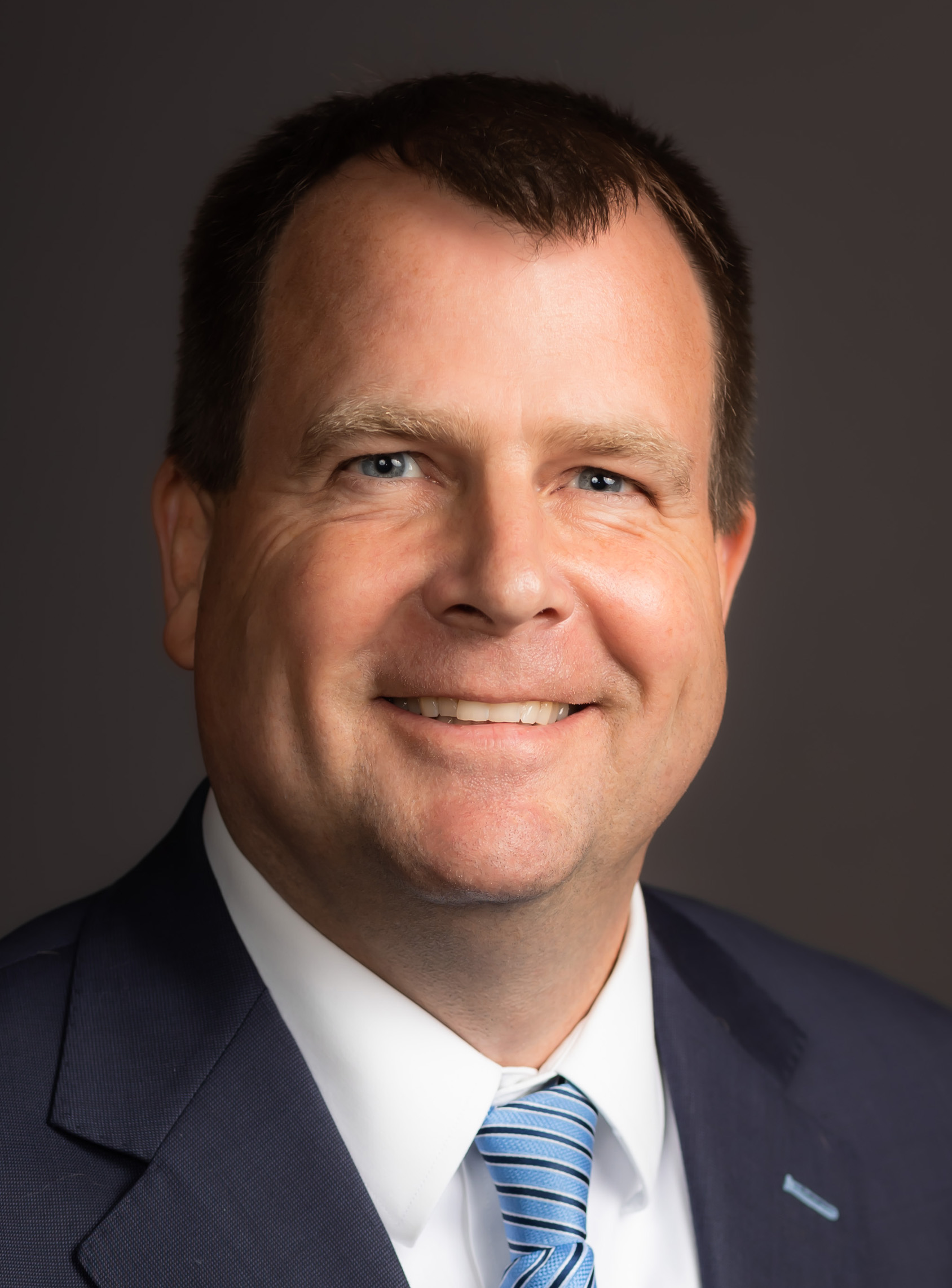
- Official headshot

Member of the Georgia House of Representatives from the 160th district
- Incumbent
- Assumed office January 9, 2023
- Preceded by: Jan Tankersley (redistricting)

Personal details
- Born: Savannah, Georgia, U.S.
- Party: Republican
- Education: Statesboro High School
- Alma mater: The Citadel, The Military College of South Carolina; Georgia Southern University

Herbert Lehman Franklin III is an American politician. He is a member of the Georgia House of Representatives from the 160th District.
