= Georgia Southern Botanical Garden =

Botanical garden in Statesboro, Georgia, USA

- Interactive map of Georgia Southern Botanical Garden
- Coordinates: 32°25′15.2″N 81°46′26.7″W
- Website: Official website

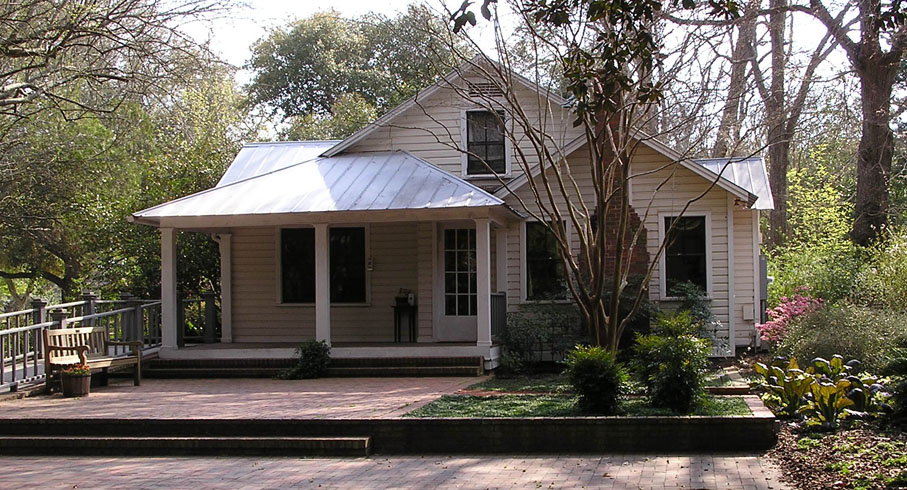
Bland Cottage from the front.

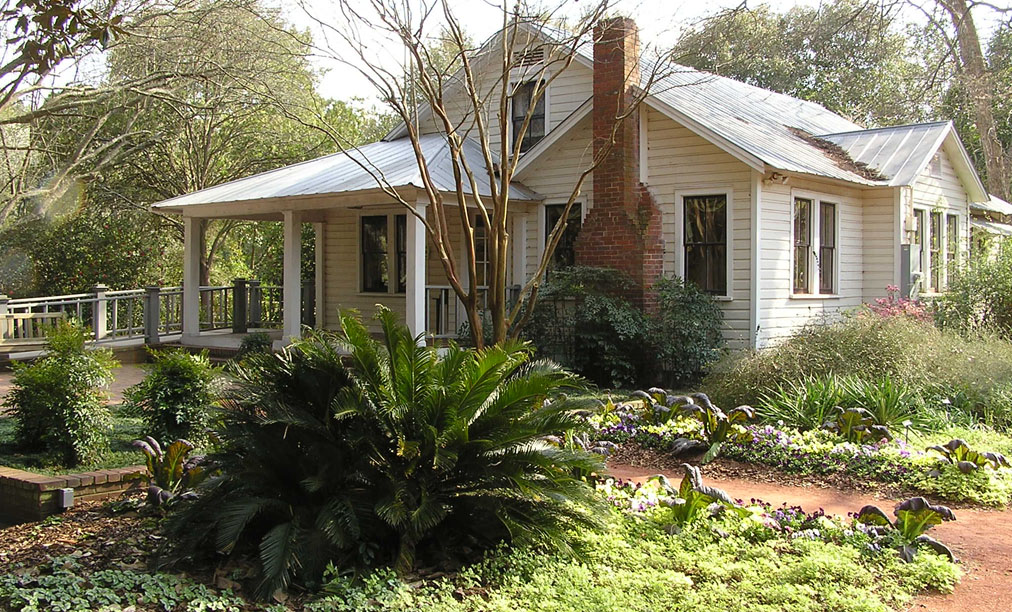
Bland Cottage from the side.

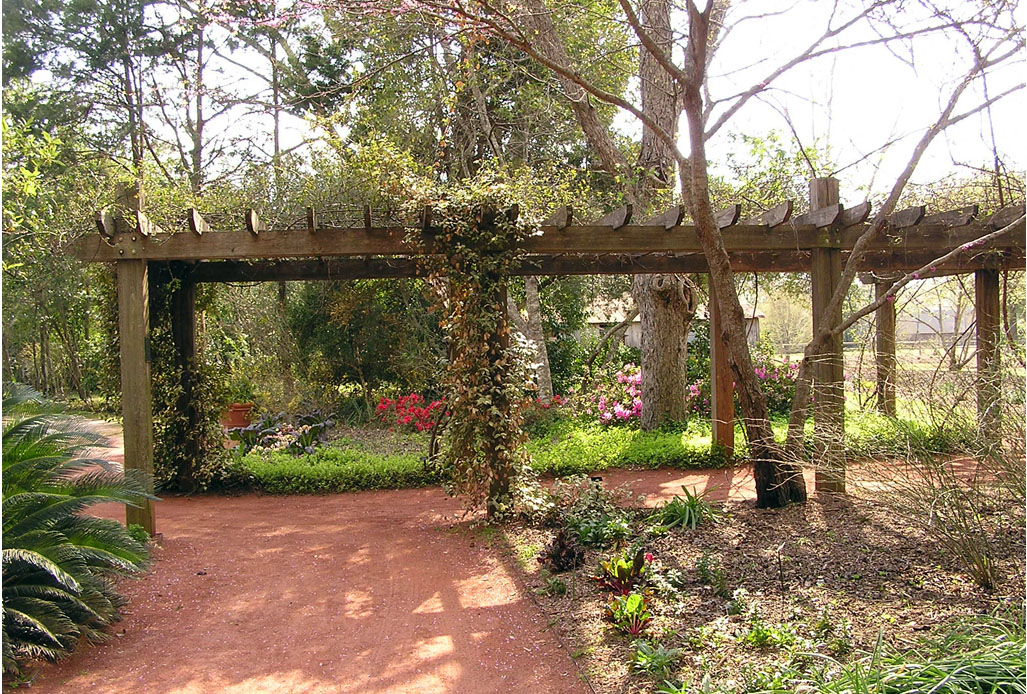
The rose arbor with azaleas blooming in the background.

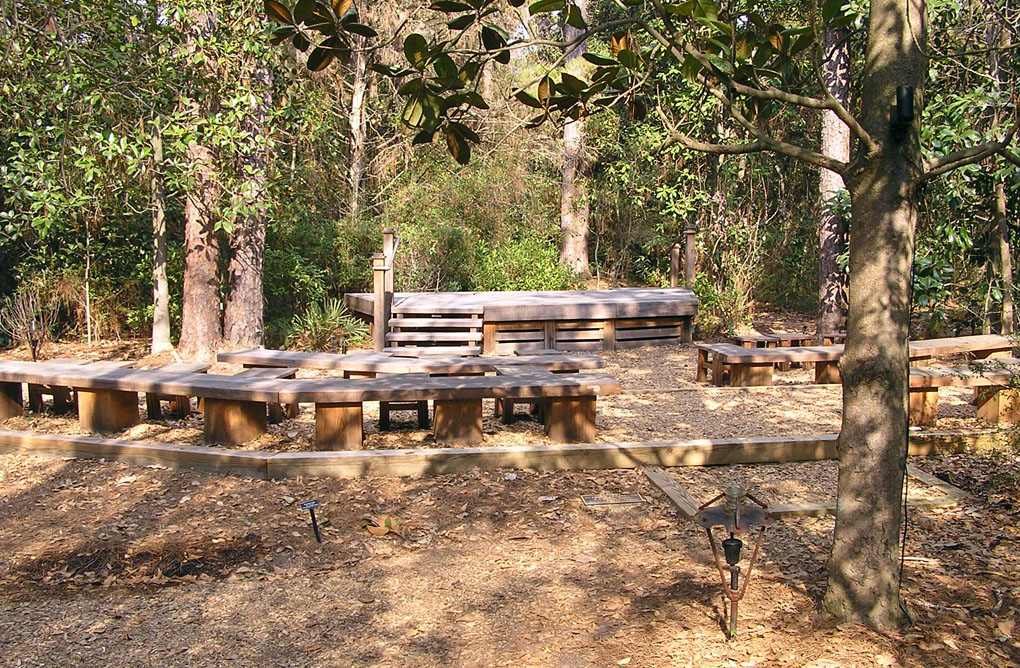
The Kennedy Outdoor Classroom with its stage in the woodland trail area of the Georgia Southern Botanical Garden.

The Botanic Garden at Georgia Southern University is a botanical garden featuring unique and endangered plants with many native to Georgia. The garden is 11 acres (4.5 ha) and is located at 1505 Bland Avenue, Statesboro, Georgia, a few blocks from the main Georgia Southern University campus.

The garden's staff offers a variety of instructional programs, events, plant sales, and workshops during the year with a focus on gardening. The garden is also used by Georgia Southern University as well as others as a place for festivals and celebrations. The garden usually provides an annual Arbor Day event offering several varieties of seedling trees to the community.

== History ==
The main grounds for the Botanic Garden were willed to Georgia Southern University by the owners of the land, Dan and Catharine Bland. The garden is centered on an early 20th-century farmstead the house of which, Bland Cottage, has been renovated into a visitor center and place for meetings. The garden has a number of specialized areas including the Heritage Garden, Rose Arbor, Children Vegetable Garden, Camellia Garden, Native Plant Landscape Garden, Native Azalea Collection, Bog Garden, and walking woodland trails.

The walking woodland trails have benches scattered about so that people can sit and rest while enjoying the birds and other wildlife that live within the gardens. On one woodland trail is the Kennedy Outdoor Classroom with a small raised stage and benches that is used for some botanical garden presentations.

Several species of birds spend time in the garden including robins, wood thrush, brown thrashers, mockingbirds, various species of sparrows, and cardinalids, all native to southern Georgia. Squirrels also live on the grounds. Bees and butterflies are usually busy with the various flowers. The garden has a large number of flowering plants including camellias, azaleas, flowering quince, roses, magnolia trees, redbud trees, and others.

=== Oak Grove Schoolhouse ===
The Oak Grove Schoolhouse, a historic one-room schoolhouse originally located in Tattnall County, was moved to a site in the garden in 2010. It is one of few surviving out of 7,000 in the state in 1900.

=== Dan and Catharine Bland ===
Daniel "Dan" Edgar Bland was born on November 28, 1894, in Bulloch County, Georgia. He died September 20, 1985 (91 years old) and is buried in Statesboro, Georgia. Catharine O'Neal Bland was born March 19, 1897, in Hinesville, Georgia. She died August 21, 1983 (86 years old) and is buried in Statesboro, Georgia. They met at First District Agricultural and Mechanical School (which would later become Georgia Southern University) and married in 1916.

== See also ==
- List of botanical gardens in the United States
- Coastal Georgia Botanical Gardens at the Historic Bamboo Farm (Savannah, Georgia)
