= DeAngelo Tyson =

American football player (born 1989)

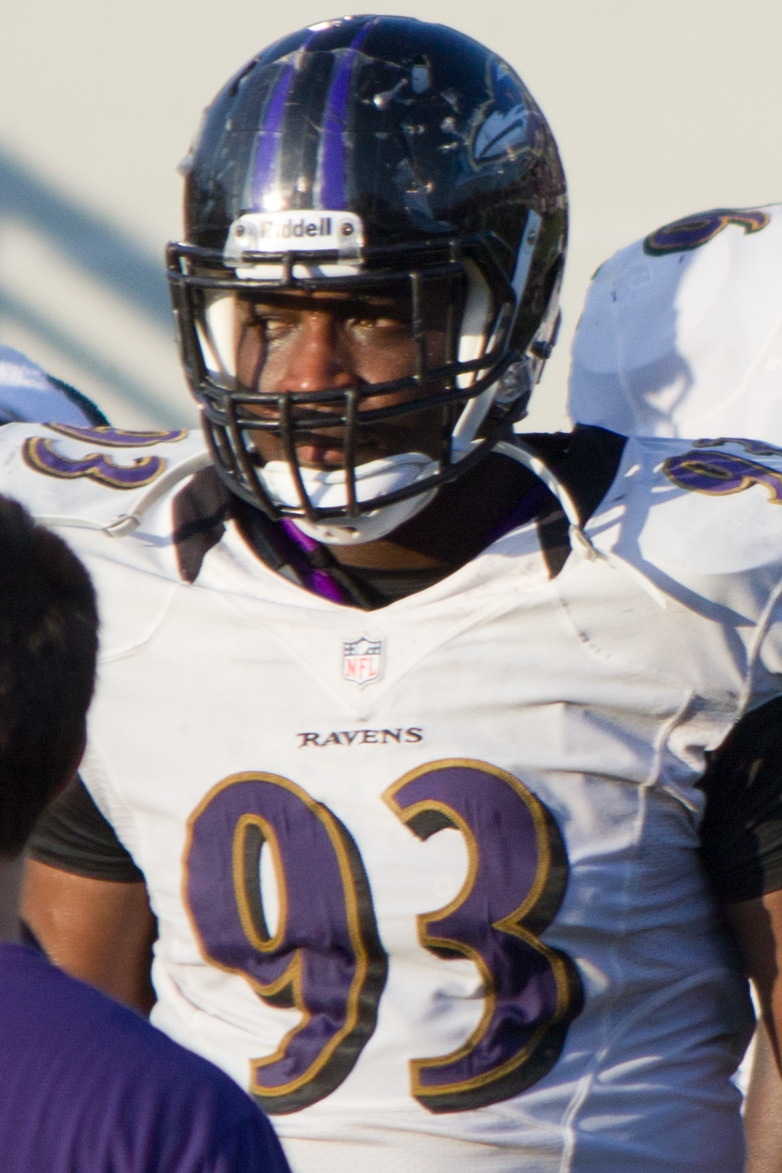
- Tyson with the Baltimore Ravens in 2012

No. 93
- Position: Defensive end

Personal information
- Born: April 12, 1989 (age 37); Savannah, Georgia, U.S.
- Listed height: 6 ft 2 in (1.88 m)
- Listed weight: 315 lb (143 kg)

Career information
- High school: Statesboro (Statesboro, Georgia)
- College: Georgia
- NFL draft: 2012: 7th round, 236th overall pick

Career history
- Baltimore Ravens (2012–2015); Seattle Seahawks (2016)*
- * Offseason or practice squad member only

Awards and highlights
- Super Bowl champion (XLVII)

Career NFL statistics
- Total tackles: 42
- Sacks: 3
- Fumble recoveries: 2
- Interceptions: 1
- Stats at Pro Football Reference

DeAngelo Tyson (born April 12, 1989) is an American former professional football player who was a defensive end in the National Football League (NFL). He played college football for the Georgia Bulldogs and was selected in the seventh round, 236th overall, by the Baltimore Ravens in the 2012 NFL draft.

== Early life ==
Tyson was born in Savannah, Georgia, on April 12, 1989. During his childhood, Tyson lived in a home where his father wasn't around and his mother was abusive. When Tyson was 10 years old, his mother beat him badly enough that neighbors called for help. Tyson moved out of his mother's home and transferred to the Joseph Home for Boys, an affiliate of The Department of Family and Children Services. He lived in DFCS care until he completed middle school. Tyson attended Statesboro High School in Statesboro, Georgia, where he was teammates with Justin Houston. In his sophomore year, he was a member of 2005 AAAA state champion team. As a senior, he registered 54 tackles, 14 for loss, and nine sacks, and was a 2007 USA Today high school All-USA selection. He picked Georgia over Tennessee, South Carolina, North Carolina State, Auburn, and Florida.

College recruiting
Name	Hometown	School	Height	Weight	40^{‡}	Commit date
DeAngelo Tyson; DT	Statesboro, Georgia	Statesboro (GA)	6 ft 2 in (1.88 m)	276 lb (125 kg)	5.1	Jan 11, 2008
DeAngelo Tyson; DT	Recruit ratings: Scout: Rivals: (83)					
Overall recruit ranking: Scout: 3 (DT) Rivals: 4 (DT), 3 (GA) ESPN: 4 (DT)
Note: In many cases, Scout, Rivals, 247Sports, On3, and ESPN may conflict in their listings of height and weight.; In these cases, the average was taken. ESPN grades are on a 100-point scale.; Sources: "Georgia Football Commitments". Rivals.; "2008 Georgia Football Commits". Scout.; "ESPN". ESPN.; "Scout.com Team Recruiting Rankings". Scout.; "2008 Team Ranking". Rivals.com.

== College career ==
He played college football for the Georgia Bulldogs under head coach Mark Richt.

== Professional career ==
=== 2012 NFL draft ===
Projected as a 6th–7th round selection, Tyson was listed as the No. 22 defensive tackle available in the 2012 NFL draft. Sports Illustrated described him as "tough college defensive lineman", who, however, "lacks great athleticism and upside for the next level."

Pre-draft measurables
Height	Weight	40-yard dash	10-yard split	20-yard split	20-yard shuttle	Vertical jump	Broad jump	Bench press
6 ft 2 1/2 in (1.89 m)	315 lb (143 kg)	5.08 s	1.74 s	2.87 s	4.68 s	27 1/2 in (0.70 m)	9 ft 0 in (2.74 m)	30 reps
All values from Georgia Pro Day

=== Baltimore Ravens ===
He was selected in the seventh round with the 236th overall selection by the Baltimore Ravens in the 2012 NFL draft. Tyson was a member of the Ravens' Super Bowl XLVII championship winning team. He recorded his first career interception versus Matthew Stafford and the Detroit Lions in Week 15 of the 2013 season. On September 5, 2015, he was waived-injured by the Ravens. On September 7, 2015, Tyson was released by the Ravens with an injury settlement.

=== Seattle Seahawks ===
He was signed by the Seattle Seahawks to a reserve/futures contract on January 19, 2016. On August 29, 2016, he was waived by the Seahawks.
