= Jeremy Mincey =

American football player (born 1983)

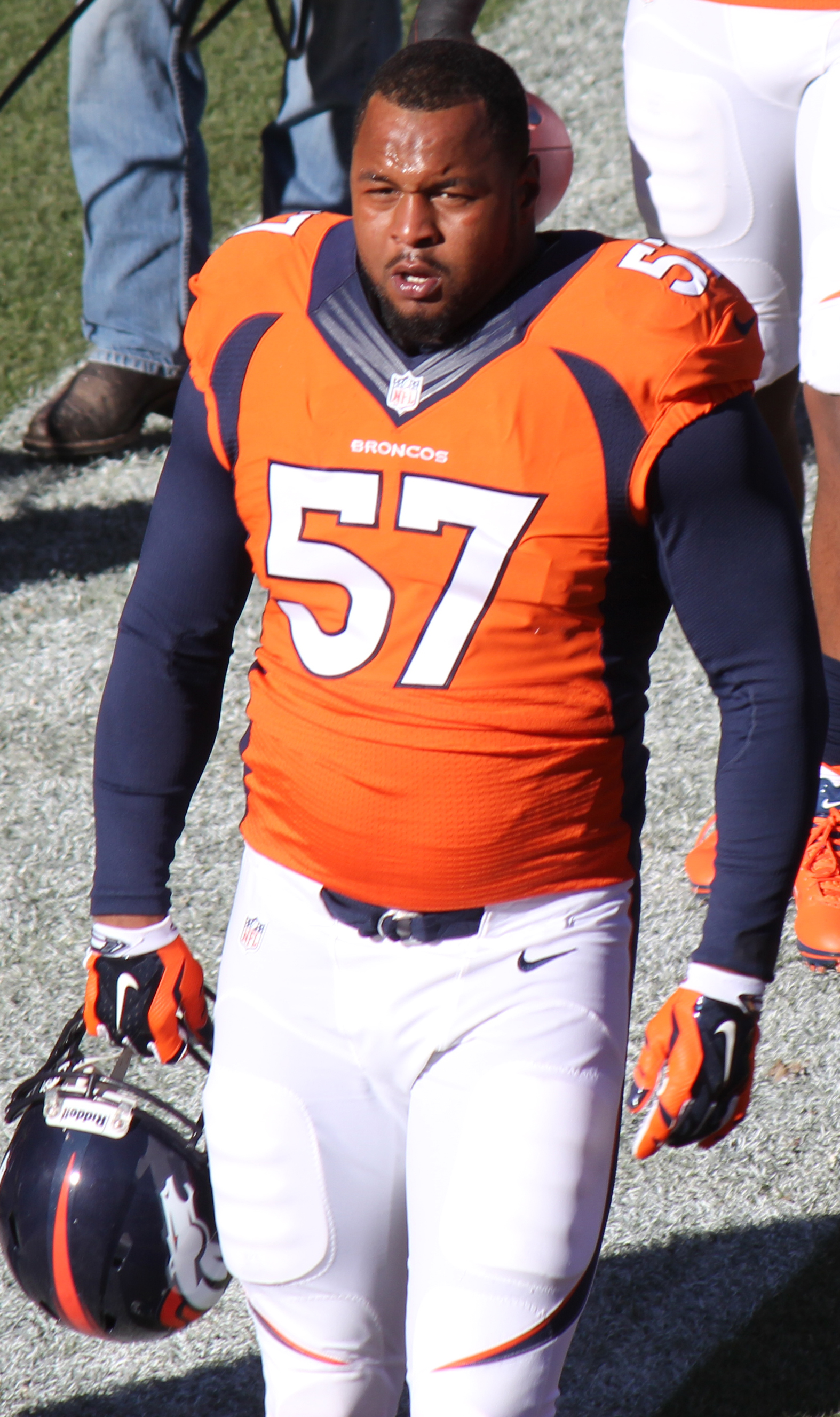
- Mincey with the Denver Broncos in 2014

No. 94, 57, 92
- Position: Defensive end

Personal information
- Born: December 14, 1983 (age 42); Statesboro, Georgia, U.S.
- Listed height: 6 ft 4 in (1.93 m)
- Listed weight: 280 lb (127 kg)

Career information
- High school: Statesboro
- College: Butler CC (2002–2003); Florida (2004–2005)
- NFL draft: 2006: 6th round, 191st overall pick

Career history
- New England Patriots (2006)*; San Francisco 49ers (2006)*; Jacksonville Jaguars (2006–2013); Denver Broncos (2013); Dallas Cowboys (2014–2015)
- * Offseason or practice squad member only

Awards and highlights
- All-KJCCC (2003); Second-team All-SEC (2005)

Career NFL statistics
- Total tackles: 217
- Sacks: 26.0
- Forced fumbles: 8
- Pass deflections: 12
- Interceptions: 1
- Stats at Pro Football Reference

Jeremy Lamar Mincey (born December 14, 1983) is an American former professional football player who was a defensive end in the National Football League (NFL). He was selected by the New England Patriots in the sixth round of the 2006 NFL draft. He played college football for the Florida Gators. He was also a member of the San Francisco 49ers, Jacksonville Jaguars, Denver Broncos, and Dallas Cowboys

== Early life ==
Mincey was born in Statesboro, Georgia on December 14, 1983. He attended Statesboro High School. As a freshman, he was academically ineligible to play sports. As a sophomore, he lettered in basketball.

He preferred playing basketball and didn't try out for football until his junior year. He started the season opener game and was benched for the rest of the year. As a senior, he became a regular starter at defensive end and contributed to the team winning the 2001 state 4A championship.

== College career ==
After originally receiving a football scholarship offer from the University of Florida, Mincey couldn't be accepted because he was missing a core course. Although he signed with Jacksonville State University, he ended up opting to enroll at Butler County Community College in El Dorado, Kansas, where he played from 2002 to 2003. As a sophomore, he was recognized as a first-team all-conference, after tallying 59 total tackles (11.5 for loss), four quarterback sacks, one interception, two pass breakups, three forced fumbles, four recovered fumbles and one sack for a safety. Rivals.com rated Mincey as the No. 18 non-high school player in the country.

After his sophomore year, he transferred to the University of Florida in Gainesville, Florida, where he played for head coaches Ron Zook and Urban Meyer's Florida Gators football teams in 2004 and 2005.

As a junior in 2004, he started 12 games at left defensive end, collecting 51 tackles, 9 tackles for loss (tied for second on the team), 7 quarterback pressures (led the team), one interception and 7 passes defensed (second on the team). He was a special teams member of the field goal, extra point block and punt return units.

As a senior team captain in 2005, he started 12 games at left defensive end and earned second-team All-Southeastern Conference (SEC) honors. He ranked fourth on the team with 62 tackles and second with 10.5 tackles for a loss. He also tallied 3.5 sacks, 2 passes defensed and one fumble recovery. He had 10 tackles (3 for loss), 2 sacks and one quarterback pressure against Mississippi State University. He made 10 tackles and one sack against Louisiana State University. He started in all twenty-four games in which he played for the Gators.

Mincey graduated from the University of Florida with a bachelor's degree in Health and Human Performance in 2007.

== Professional career ==
Pre-draft measurables
Height	Weight	Arm length	Hand span	40-yard dash	10-yard split	20-yard split	20-yard shuttle	Three-cone drill	Vertical jump	Broad jump	Bench press
6 ft 3 1/2 in (1.92 m)	259 lb (117 kg)	31 3/4 in (0.81 m)	9 7/8 in (0.25 m)	4.68 s	1.64 s	2.79 s	4.25 s	6.99 s	33.5 in (0.85 m)	10 ft 1 in (3.07 m)	27 reps
All values from NFL Combine/Pro Day

=== New England Patriots ===
Mincey was selected by the New England Patriots in the sixth round (191st pick overall) of the 2006 NFL draft, with the intention of converting him into an outside linebacker. He was waived on September 1.

=== San Francisco 49ers ===
On September 4, 2006, he was signed to the San Francisco 49ers' practice squad.

=== Jacksonville Jaguars ===
On December 14, 2006, Mincey was signed by the Jacksonville Jaguars off the San Francisco 49ers' practice squad, to play as a defensive end. He was declared inactive in the last 3 weeks of the season.

On August 27, 2007, he was waived, after being limited with injuries during the preseason. On September 2, he was signed to the team's practice squad. On November 9, he was signed to the active roster and got a chance to play in six regular season games and two playoff contests. He finished with 12 tackles (seven solo), one quarterback sack, six quarterback pressures and one special teams tackle.

On August 26, 2008, he was placed on the physically unable to perform list with a wrist injury. On November 5, he was activated and saw action in 3 of the last 4 contests. He tallied 6 tackles and one sack. On August 26, 2009, he was waived and remained out of football during that season.

On January 20, 2010, he was re-signed by the Jacksonville Jaguars. He appeared in 15 games and started the last 8 contests at left defensive end over former first-round draft choice Derrick Harvey. He suffered a broken hand in practice and was declared inactive for the sixth game against the Tennessee Titans. He compiled 31 tackles (6 for loss), five sacks (led the team), 25 quarterback pressures (second on the team) and three pass deflections. He had 9 tackles, 2 sacks and 3 quarterback pressures against the Cleveland Browns.

In 2011, he started all 16 games at right defensive end, registering 101 tackles (fourth on the team), 8 sacks (led the team), 45 quarterback pressures (led the team), 7 tackles for loss (tied for third on the team), 4 forced fumbles (led the team), one interception, 2 passes defensed and one fumble recovery. He was a part of a defense that ranked sixth in the NFL (313.0-yard average). He had 9 tackles, 2.5 sacks, one quarterback pressure and one forced fumble against the Indianapolis Colts. He made 15 tackles, one sack, one quarterback pressure and 2 tackles for loss against the Atlanta Falcons.

On March 13, 2012, faced with free agency, Mincey signed a new four-year contract with the Jaguars. He started all 11 games at left defensive end and 5 contests at right defensive end. He posted 74 tackles (sixth on the team), 3 sacks (second on the team), 20 quarterback pressures (led the team), 2 forced fumbles (tied for the team lead), 4 tackles for loss (tied for fourth on the team), 4 passes defensed and one fumble recovery. He had 9 tackles and one quarterback pressure against the Buffalo Bills.

In 2013, he missed two games after oversleeping and missing a team meeting, not traveling to the team's win over the Houston Texans on November 24 and being on the sidelines during a win against the Cleveland Browns on December 1. He was released on December 12. He appeared in 8 games as a backup defensive end and was declared inactive in 5 contests. He tallied 14 tackles (3 for loss), 2 sacks, 3 quarterback pressures and one pass defensed.

=== Denver Broncos ===
On December 16, 2013, he was signed as a free agent by the Denver Broncos, reuniting him with former Jaguars head coach Jack Del Rio, who was the team's defensive coordinator. He was used as a reserve player and was a part of the playoff push to reach Super Bowl XLVIII, but wasn't re-signed after the season.

=== Dallas Cowboys ===
On March 11, 2014, he signed with the Dallas Cowboys as a free agent, who were looking to improve their defensive depth after being forced to release DeMarcus Ware for salary cap reasons. He quickly developed into one of the Cowboys leaders and was named a team captain after Justin Durant was lost for the season. He led the team with 6 sacks and 39 quarterback pressures, after starting every game and keeping second round draft choice DeMarcus Lawrence in a reserve role.

In 2015, Mincey missed the first four days of training camp in a contract dispute. He started six of the first 13 games, including four that Greg Hardy missed while he was suspended by the league. His playing time and effectiveness decreased during the year, after he was limited by bone spurs in his right elbow, which eventually required offseason surgery. He didn't register a sack during the season and was declared inactive against the Buffalo Bills. Besides playing defensive end, he was also used at the one-technique defensive tackle position in passing situations. He wasn't re-signed after the season.

=== Retirement ===
Mincey announced his retirement from professional football on August 23, 2016.

== NFL career statistics ==
Legend
**Bold**	Career high

=== Regular season ===
Year	Team	Games		Tackles					Interceptions					Fumbles			
Year	Team	GP	GS	Cmb	Solo	Ast	Sck	TFL	Int	Yds	TD	Lng	PD	FF	FR	Yds	TD
2007	JAX	6	0	10	7	3	1.0	1	0	0	0	0	1	0	0	0	0
2008	JAX	3	0	5	4	1	1.0	1	0	0	0	0	0	0	0	0	0
2010	JAX	15	8	31	25	6	5.0	9	0	0	0	0	3	0	0	0	0
2011	JAX	**16**	**16**	**57**	**40**	**17**	**8.0**	**10**	**1**	**5**	0	**5**	1	**4**	**1**	0	0
2012	JAX	**16**	**16**	41	35	6	3.0	7	0	0	0	0	**5**	2	**1**	0	0
2013	JAX	8	0	16	9	7	2.0	4	0	0	0	0	1	0	0	0	0
2013	DEN	2	0	1	1	0	0.0	0	0	0	0	0	0	0	0	0	0
2014	DAL	**16**	**16**	37	20	**17**	6.0	9	0	0	0	0	0	2	**1**	0	0
2015	DAL	14	6	19	11	8	0.0	1	0	0	0	0	1	0	0	0	0
		96	62	217	152	65	26.0	42	1	5	0	5	12	8	3	0	0

=== Playoffs ===
Year	Team	Games		Tackles					Interceptions					Fumbles			
Year	Team	GP	GS	Cmb	Solo	Ast	Sck	TFL	Int	Yds	TD	Lng	PD	FF	FR	Yds	TD
2007	JAX	2	0	4	2	2	1.0	1	0	0	0	0	0	0	0	0	0
2013	DEN	**3**	0	6	2	**4**	1.0	1	0	0	0	0	0	0	0	0	0
2014	DAL	2	**2**	**9**	**6**	3	**2.0**	**2**	0	0	0	0	**1**	**1**	**1**	0	0
		7	2	19	10	9	4.0	4	0	0	0	0	1	1	1	0	0

== Personal life ==
In 2012, Mincey opened his own recording studio in Jacksonville, Fl. named, "Mr. Mince Recording Studios". He is currently managed by OG Ron C for his music career.

In 2018, he started a clothing line called Kumfee Kush. It's an urban clothing line for the family inspired by hip hop music.

== See also ==
- History of the Jacksonville Jaguars
- List of Florida Gators in the NFL draft
- List of University of Florida alumni
