= Brooklet, Georgia =

- City
- Seal

- Location in Bulloch County and the state of Georgia
- Coordinates: 32°22′56″N 81°39′53″W
- Country: United States
- State: Georgia
- County: Bulloch

Area
  - Total: 3.37 sq mi (8.72 km^{2})
  - Land: 3.29 sq mi (8.53 km^{2})
  - Water: 0.073 sq mi (0.19 km^{2})
- Elevation: 151 ft (46 m)

Population (2020)
  - Total: 1,704
  - Density: 517.3/sq mi (199.73/km^{2})
- Time zone: UTC-5 (Eastern (EST))
  - Summer (DST): UTC-4 (EDT)
- ZIP code: 30415
- Area code: 912
- FIPS code: 13-11000
- GNIS feature ID: 0311827
- Website: https://cityofbrooklet.org/

Brooklet is a city in Bulloch County, Georgia, United States. It is located roughly 9 miles (14 km) east of Statesboro. As of the 2020 census, the city had a population of 1,704.

It is the home of the Southeast Bulloch School system. It is located along US Highway 80. The Georgia General Assembly incorporated Brooklet as a town in 1906.

== Geography ==
Brooklet is located at 32°22′56″N 81°39′53″W (32.382175, -81.664695).

According to the United States Census Bureau, the city has a total area of 3.4 square miles (8.7 km^{2}), of which 3.3 square miles (8.5 km^{2}) is land and 0.077 square miles (0.2 km^{2}), or 2.26%, is water.

=== Climate ===
Climate data for Brooklet, Georgia (1991–2020 normals, extremes 1925–present)
Month	Jan	Feb	Mar	Apr	May	Jun	Jul	Aug	Sep	Oct	Nov	Dec	Year
Record high °F (°C)	87 (31)	86 (30)	94 (34)	98 (37)	102 (39)	106 (41)	109 (43)	107 (42)	107 (42)	99 (37)	93 (34)	86 (30)	109 (43)
Mean maximum °F (°C)	76.0 (24.4)	78.6 (25.9)	83.5 (28.6)	88.7 (31.5)	94.0 (34.4)	97.6 (36.4)	98.2 (36.8)	97.9 (36.6)	94.0 (34.4)	88.0 (31.1)	82.5 (28.1)	77.1 (25.1)	99.6 (37.6)
Mean daily maximum °F (°C)	60.7 (15.9)	64.2 (17.9)	71.0 (21.7)	78.5 (25.8)	85.9 (29.9)	90.6 (32.6)	92.8 (33.8)	91.7 (33.2)	86.8 (30.4)	79.4 (26.3)	70.0 (21.1)	62.8 (17.1)	77.9 (25.5)
Daily mean °F (°C)	49.1 (9.5)	52.2 (11.2)	58.5 (14.7)	65.6 (18.7)	73.7 (23.2)	79.9 (26.6)	82.2 (27.9)	81.3 (27.4)	76.5 (24.7)	67.5 (19.7)	57.6 (14.2)	51.4 (10.8)	66.3 (19.1)
Mean daily minimum °F (°C)	37.5 (3.1)	40.2 (4.6)	46.0 (7.8)	52.8 (11.6)	61.5 (16.4)	69.2 (20.7)	71.6 (22.0)	70.9 (21.6)	66.3 (19.1)	55.5 (13.1)	45.1 (7.3)	40.0 (4.4)	54.7 (12.6)
Mean minimum °F (°C)	22.6 (−5.2)	26.1 (−3.3)	30.3 (−0.9)	39.5 (4.2)	49.1 (9.5)	62.0 (16.7)	67.1 (19.5)	64.7 (18.2)	55.0 (12.8)	40.6 (4.8)	30.7 (−0.7)	26.3 (−3.2)	20.4 (−6.4)
Record low °F (°C)	1 (−17)	14 (−10)	15 (−9)	30 (−1)	40 (4)	49 (9)	57 (14)	55 (13)	35 (2)	29 (−2)	13 (−11)	7 (−14)	1 (−17)
Average precipitation inches (mm)	3.60 (91)	3.77 (96)	3.72 (94)	3.27 (83)	3.18 (81)	5.62 (143)	4.75 (121)	6.33 (161)	4.05 (103)	2.64 (67)	2.66 (68)	3.39 (86)	46.98 (1,193)
Average precipitation days	7.7	7.4	6.7	6.3	6.8	10.2	10.4	10.3	7.4	5.3	5.3	7.4	91.2
Source: NOAA

== Demographics ==
Historical population
Census	Pop.	Note	%±
1910	361		—
1920	600		66.2%
1930	536		−10.7%
1940	503		−6.2%
1950	536		6.6%
1960	557		3.9%
1970	683		22.6%
1980	1,035		51.5%
1990	1,013		−2.1%
2000	1,113		9.9%
2010	1,395		25.3%
2020	1,704		22.2%
2023 (est.)	2,063	▲	21.1%
U.S. Decennial Census

=== 2020 census ===
As of the 2020 census, Brooklet had a population of 1,704. The median age was 36.6 years. 27.9% of residents were under the age of 18 and 14.0% of residents were 65 years of age or older. For every 100 females there were 95.0 males, and for every 100 females age 18 and over there were 91.6 males age 18 and over.

0.0% of residents lived in urban areas, while 100.0% lived in rural areas.

There were 631 households in Brooklet, including 492 family households, of which 42.2% had children under the age of 18 living in them. Of all households, 54.8% were married-couple households, 15.2% were households with a male householder and no spouse or partner present, and 24.6% were households with a female householder and no spouse or partner present. About 20.3% of all households were made up of individuals and 9.5% had someone living alone who was 65 years of age or older.

There were 663 housing units, of which 4.8% were vacant. The homeowner vacancy rate was 1.8% and the rental vacancy rate was 3.9%.

Brooklet racial composition as of 2020
Race	Num.	Perc.
White (non-Hispanic)	1,331	78.11%
Black or African American (non-Hispanic)	219	12.85%
Native American	7	0.41%
Asian	7	0.41%
Pacific Islander	1	0.06%
Other/Mixed	74	4.34%
Hispanic or Latino	65	3.81%

== Peanut Festival ==
The Brooklet Peanut Festival is an annual festival that occurs on the third Saturday of September.

The first festival was held in 1990. It drew about 2,000 people and helped finance a town park lined with benches around a gazebo and fountain. The park was dedicated to the Town of Brooklet at the 6th Annual Peanut Festival in 1995. The Brooklet Peanut Festival consists of an annual parade, a beauty pageant, a Peanut Run, booths, entertainment, and a tractor race. Each year, the festival has grown in attendance.

The parade follows an approximately 2-mile (3 km) route with participation from local schools, organizations and businesses. The beauty pageant has many age groups, including 0–6 months, 7–18 months, 9–35 months, 3–4 years, 5–6 years, 7–9 years, 10–12 years, 13–15 years, 16 years and over. The contestant who wins in the 16 and over category is crowned Miss Peanut Queen.

The Brooklet Peanut Run is a 5K race that used to be run around 7 am on the day of the Peanut Festival. However, when the festival changed dates to the September, the Peanut Run kept its August Date. The race begins and ends at Brooklet Elementary School. There are approximately 300 participants in the race each year.

The festival has live, free entertainment. Performers have included the Southern Dance Academy, Southeast Bulloch High School band, and many local bands.

The slow tractor race is an annual race where tractors race as slowly as possible. The last tractor to cross the finish line is the winner. The Kiddie Pedal Tractor race is designed for children who race a pint-sized tractor.

== Notable people ==
- Cecil B. Day, founder of Days Inn hotels.
- Jan Tankersley, member of the Georgia House of Representatives and former member of the Brooklet City Council.
