= DeMarcus Lawrence =

American football player (born 1992)

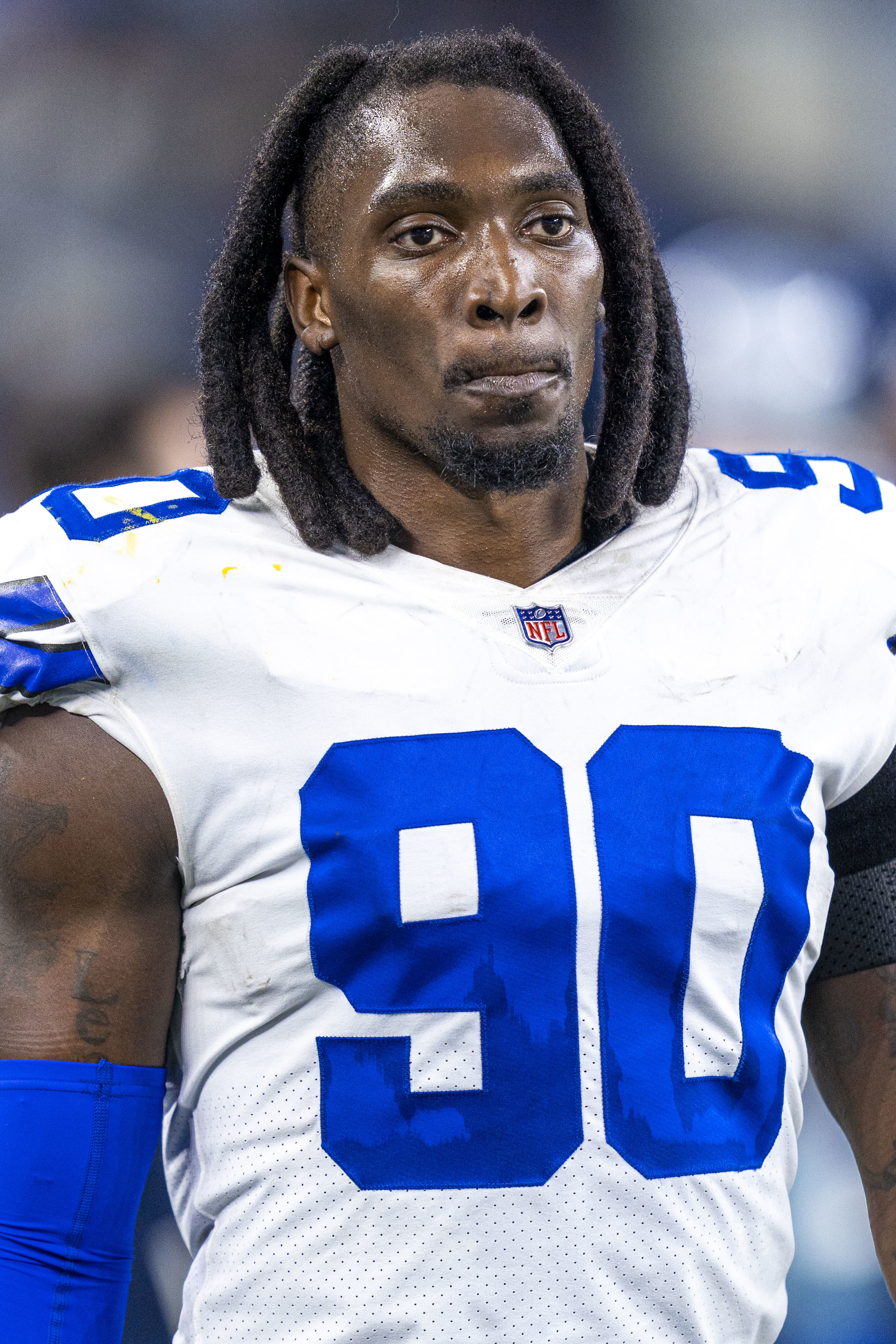
- Lawrence with the Dallas Cowboys in 2021

No. 0 – Seattle Seahawks
- Position: Outside linebacker
- Roster status: Active

Personal information
- Born: April 28, 1992 (age 34); Aiken, South Carolina, U.S.
- Listed height: 6 ft 3 in (1.91 m)
- Listed weight: 254 lb (115 kg)

Career information
- High school: Silver Bluff (Aiken)
- College: Butler CC (2010–2011); Boise State (2012–2013)
- NFL draft: 2014: 2nd round, 34th overall pick

Career history
- Dallas Cowboys (2014–2024); Seattle Seahawks (2025–present)

Awards and highlights
- Super Bowl champion (LX); Second-team All-Pro (2017); 5× Pro Bowl (2017, 2018, 2022, 2023, 2025); First-team All-MWC (2012, 2013)

Career NFL statistics as of Week 6, 2026
- Total tackles: 515
- Sacks: 67.5
- Forced fumbles: 24
- Fumble recoveries: 11
- Interceptions: 2
- Pass deflections: 23
- Defensive touchdowns: 4
- Stats at Pro Football Reference

DeMarcus Lawrence (born April 28, 1992) is an American professional football outside linebacker for the Seattle Seahawks of the National Football League (NFL). Nicknamed "Tank", he played college football for the Butler Community College Grizzlies and Boise State Broncos. Lawrence was selected by the Dallas Cowboys in the second round of the 2014 NFL draft. He spent 11 seasons with the Cowboys before signing with the Seahawks in 2025. He won Super Bowl LX the same year.

== Early life ==
Lawrence attended Silver Bluff High School in Aiken, South Carolina. As a senior, he played tight end, offensive tackle and defensive tackle, while tallying 97 tackles and three sacks. He received North-South All-Star honors.

== College career ==
Lawrence enrolled at Butler Community College and was redshirted in 2010. As a redshirt freshman in 2011, he collected 69 tackles (second on the team), 21 tackles for loss (led the team) and 12 sacks (led the team), while earning All-Jayhawk Conference and NJCAA All-America honors.

He transferred to Boise State University before the 2012 season. As a sophomore, he started all 11 games and led the team with 13.5 tackles for loss and 9.5 sacks. He also made 48 tackles, four forced fumbles (tied for the team lead), two fumble recoveries (one returned for a 25-yard touchdown), one interception and one blocked kick. He had nine tackles against Michigan State. He had 2.5 sacks against Miami (OH). He made 2.5 tackles for loss against San Diego State.

Lawrence had 3.5 sacks against Nevada. He made 9 tackles (5 solo) against the United States Air Force Academy. As a junior in 2013, he started in all 12 games, posting 72 tackles (third on the team), 20.5 tackles for loss (sixth in the nation and ninth in school history), 10.5 sacks (fifth in school history) and two blocked kicks. He had a streak of six-consecutive games with a sack. His 20 career sacks were tied for the seventh in school history and his 34 career tackles for loss ranked 14th in school history. He declared for the 2014 NFL draft after the season.

== Professional career ==
Pre-draft measurables
Height	Weight	Arm length	Hand span	Wingspan	40-yard dash	10-yard split	20-yard split	20-yard shuttle	Three-cone drill	Vertical jump	Broad jump	Bench press
6 ft 2 7/8 in (1.90 m)	251 lb (114 kg)	33 3/4 in (0.86 m)	11 in (0.28 m)	6 ft 9 in (2.06 m)	4.69 s	1.63 s	2.72 s	4.31 s	7.46 s	34.5 in (0.88 m)	9 ft 5 in (2.87 m)	22 reps
All values from NFL Combine/Pro Day

=== Dallas Cowboys ===
==== 2014 ====
After releasing franchise career sack leader DeMarcus Ware in a salary cap move and having previously lost starters Jason Hatcher and Jay Ratliff, the Dallas Cowboys looked to improve the talent of their defensive line in the 2014 NFL draft. The team traded up with the Washington Redskins moving to the 34th position, in exchange for a second (#47-Trent Murphy) and a third round (#78-Spencer Long) draft choices, in order to select Lawrence in the second round. After fracturing his right foot in training camp, he started the year on the injured reserve list and did not appear in a game until Week 9 against the Arizona Cardinals. The lost time affected his play and with little impact (11 tackles with no sacks), he could not earn the starter right defensive end job ahead of Jeremy Mincey.

He played a significant role in the Wild Card Round against the Detroit Lions on January 4, 2015, with the Cowboys leading 24–20 and just over two minutes remaining in the game, quarterback Matthew Stafford fumbled deep in Detroit's territory. Rather than falling on the ball to down it and securing the game-clinching turnover, Lawrence attempted to pick it up and score, which resulted in his fumbling the ball back to the Lions. He redeemed himself on the ensuing drive, on 4th and 3 with a minute left and the Lions threatening to win the game from the Cowboys' 42-yard line, he sacked Stafford, causing a fumble and recovering it all in one play, sealing the victory. He had a strong showing in the playoffs with two sacks, a forced fumble and two fumble recoveries.

==== 2015 ====
Although defensive end Greg Hardy was the big offseason acquisition by the Cowboys, Lawrence had a bigger impact from his left defensive end position. He entered the season with an improved physical presence and would develop his edge rushing skills with every passing week.

He made his first career start in the season opener against the New York Giants. He made four tackles, three quarterback pressures and his first regular season sack against the New Orleans Saints. He had his first career multi-sack game (2) against the Washington Redskins, to go along with two tackles (one for loss), one quarterback hurry, and his first career forced fumble. He made five tackles, one sack and two quarterback hurries against the Green Bay Packers. He had four tackles for loss, one sack and one quarterback hurry against the New York Jets. He had six tackles and two quarterback pressures in the season finale against the Redskins.

Lawrence finished the season with a streak of seven games with at least a sack. He appeared in all 16 games (13 starts), while making 56 tackles, eight tackles for loss (third on the team), eight sacks (led the team), three quarterback pressures (second on the team) In January 2016, he had back surgery, which turned out to be more serious than originally expected.

==== 2016 ====
On June 30, 2016, Lawrence was suspended for four games for amphetamine use, after his appeal was denied. He had three tackles (two for loss), one sack, one quarterback pressure and one forced fumble against the Pittsburgh Steelers. He made five quarterback pressures against the Minnesota Vikings. He missed the last three games with a back injury, but was able to return for the Divisional Round playoff game against the Packers, totaling three tackles (one for a loss) and two quarterback pressures as a backup behind David Irving.

He appeared in nine games (three starts), missing the first four contests due to the league suspension and the final three with a back injury. He tallied eight tackles, one sack, 13 quarterback hurries, and one forced fumble.

==== 2017 ====
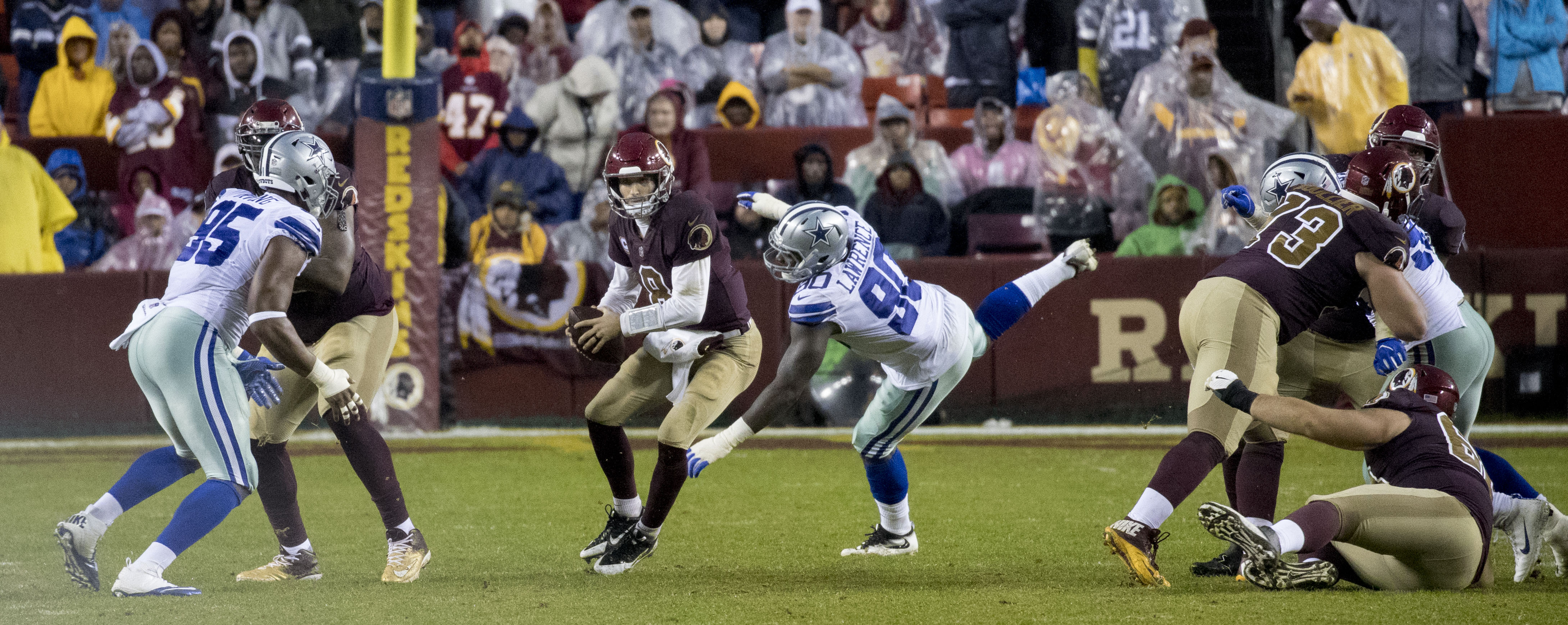
Lawrence about to sack Kirk Cousins in a game against the Washington Redskins in 2017

Lawrence had a breakout season in 2017 after shifting back over to the left side, his natural position. On September 17, 2017, in Week 2 against the Denver Broncos, Lawrence forced a fumble off quarterback Trevor Siemian. The fumble helped set up the Cowboys on a touchdown-scoring drive in the 42–17 loss.

In Week 3 of the 2017 season, Lawrence sacked Arizona Cardinals quarterback Carson Palmer three times, giving him a league-leading 6.5 sacks. The performance earned him NFC Defensive Player of the Week. Lawrence's 6.5 sacks was enough to earn NFC Defensive Player of the Month honors for the month of September.

On December 19, 2017, after a breakout season with 14.5 sacks, Lawrence was named to his first Pro Bowl. His 14.5 sacks finished tied for second in the league with the Jaguars' Calais Campbell behind the Cardinals' Chandler Jones. He was ranked 34th on the NFL Top 100 Players of 2018.

==== 2018 ====
On March 5, 2018, the Cowboys placed the franchise tag on Lawrence, who officially signed it later that day after they were unable to come to terms on a long-term deal.

In Week 4 against the Lions, Lawrence matched his career-high with a three-sack performance. On October 13, 2018, it was revealed that Lawrence was diagnosed with a torn labrum in his shoulder, in which the injury was intact for two years. In Week 12 against the Redskins he had a career high five tackles for loss, three tackles, and one quarterback pressure. He finished the season with 15 starts, 47 tackles, 12 tackles for loss (led the team), 10.5 sacks (led the team), 39 quarterback pressures (led the team), one interception, two forced fumbles and one fumble recovery. He was named to his second straight Pro Bowl. He was ranked 45th by his fellow players on the NFL Top 100 Players of 2019.

==== 2019 ====
On March 4, 2019, the Cowboys placed the franchise tag on Lawrence, making him the highest paid defensive end in the NFL. On April 5, 2019, the Cowboys signed Lawrence to a five-year, $105 million contract with $65 million guaranteed.

In week 7 against the Philadelphia Eagles, Lawrence recorded a sack forced fumble on Carson Wentz which was recovered by teammate Antwaun Woods in the 37–10 win. This was Lawrence's first sack in a game against the Eagles. He started all 16 games for the third time in his career, while collecting 40 tackles, nine tackles for loss (led the team), five sacks (second on the team), 36 quarterback pressures (second on the team), three passes defensed, two forced fumbles, and two fumble recoveries.

==== 2020 ====
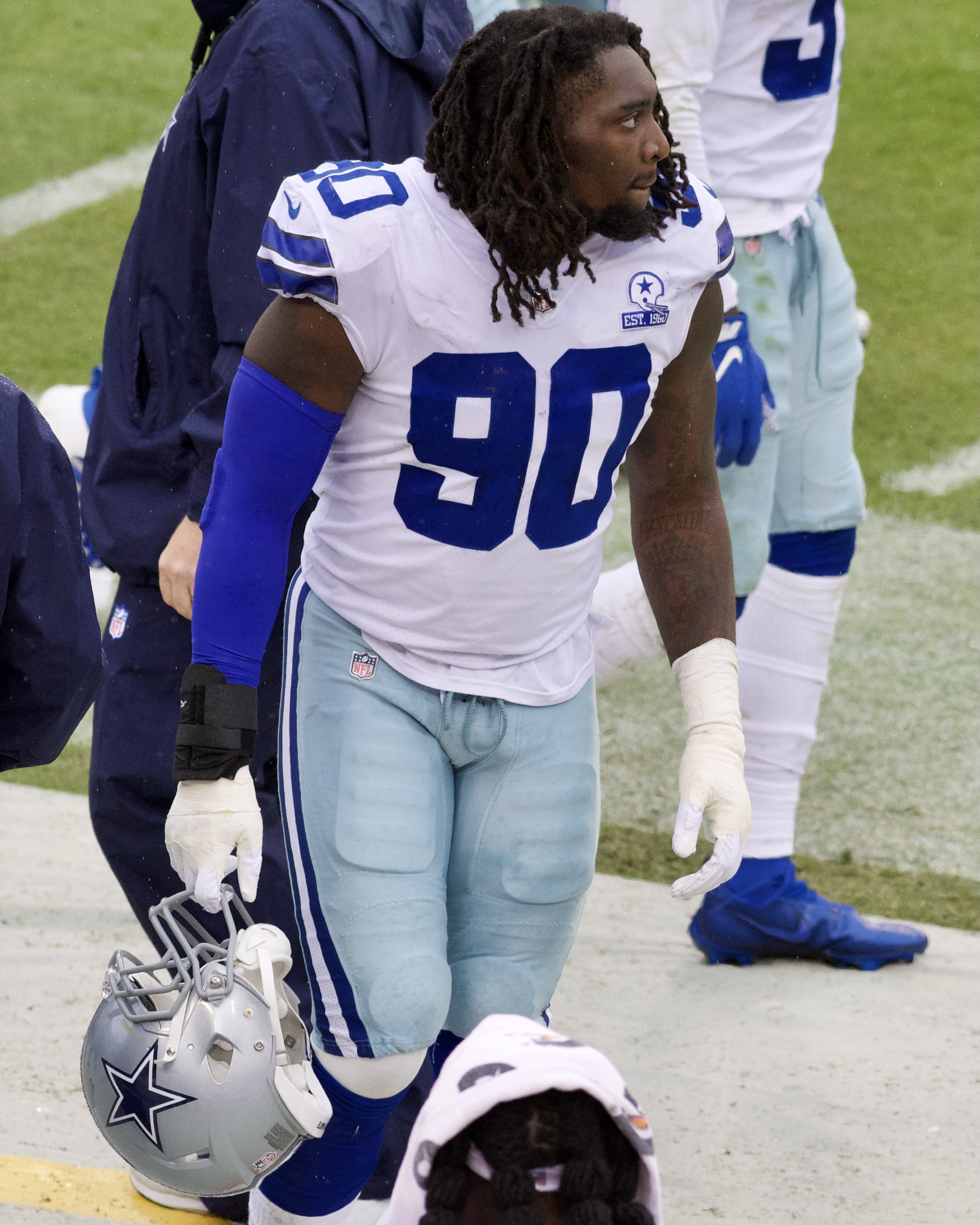
Lawrence in 2020

In Week 2 against the Atlanta Falcons, Lawrence tallied five tackles. In Week 5 against the Giants, he recorded three tackles, six quarterback pressures, his first sack of the season on Daniel Jones, a strip sack which was returned by Anthony Brown for a 29-yard touchdown during the 37–34 win.

In Week 8 against the Eagles, he had four tackles (one for loss), one sack, two quarterback pressures, and one fumble recovery. He posted 15 starts during the season, 52 tackles (8 for loss), 6.5 sacks (led the team), 37 quarterback pressures (led the team), one fumble recovery, four forced fumbles (led the team) and two passes defensed.

==== 2021 ====
On September 16, 2021, Lawrence was placed on injured reserve after undergoing surgery for a broken fifth metatarsal in his foot. He was activated on December 2. He returned in Week 13. Against the Washington Football Team in Week 16, Lawrence had a 40-yard interception return for a touchdown in the 56–14 victory. In seven games, he finished with 21 total tackles, one interception, five passes defended, and two forced fumbles.

==== 2022 ====
On March 14, 2022, Lawrence agreed to a 3-year, $40 million contract extension with the Cowboys. $30 million of the contract was guaranteed, making Lawrence the first defensive end to have his contract guaranteed for seven straight seasons. In Week 5, against the Los Angeles Rams, he had a 19-yard fumble return for a touchdown in the 22–10 victory. He finished the 2022 season with 65 total tackles, three passes defended, and three forced fumbles in 17 games and starts. He was named as a Pro Bowler for his performance in the 2022 season. He was ranked 99th by his fellow players on the NFL Top 100 Players of 2023.

==== 2023 ====
Lawrence started all 17 games in the 2023 season. He finished with four sacks, 50 total tackles, six passes defended, and one forced fumble. He was named a Pro Bowler for the 2023 season.

==== 2024 ====
Lawrence recorded three sacks in the first four games of the 2024 season before suffering a foot injury which left him out of the remainder of the season.

=== Seattle Seahawks ===
On March 13, 2025, Lawrence signed a three-year, $42 million contract with the Seattle Seahawks. Lawrence caused a minor stir upon his exit, stating "I know for sure I'm not going to win a Super Bowl there", referring to the Dallas Cowboys. In Week 10 against the Arizona Cardinals, he returned two fumbles for touchdowns in the first half in a 44–22 win, earning NFC Defensive Player of the Week. He finished the 2025 season with six sacks, 53 total tackles (24 solo), one pass defended, and three forced fumbles. He earned Pro Bowl honors for the fifth time. He recorded a sack each in the Divisional Round win over the 49ers and the NFC Championship win over the Rams. With the Seahawks, Lawrence won Super Bowl LX, 29–13, against the New England Patriots. He had a pass defended and two total tackles in the game.

== Career statistics ==
Legend
	Won the Super Bowl
	Led the league
**Bold**	Career high

=== NFL ===
==== Regular season ====
Year	Team	Games		Tackles					Interceptions						Fumbles			
Year	Team	GP	GS	Cmb	Solo	Ast	Sck	Sfty	Int	Yds	Avg	Lng	TD	PD	FF	FR	Yds	TD
2014	DAL	7	0	9	6	3	0.0	0	0	0	0.0	0	0	0	0	0	0	0
2015	DAL	16	13	55	35	20	8.0	**1**	0	0	0.0	0	0	1	1	0	0	0
2016	DAL	9	3	11	8	3	1.0	0	0	0	0.0	0	0	0	1	0	0	0
2017	DAL	16	16	58	35	23	**14.5**	0	0	0	0.0	0	0	1	**4**	2	0	0
2018	DAL	16	15	64	42	22	10.5	0	**1**	13	13.0	13	0	1	2	1	5	0
2019	DAL	16	16	45	30	15	5.0	0	0	0	0.0	0	0	2	2	2	0	0
2020	DAL	16	15	58	34	24	6.5	0	0	0	0.0	0	0	2	**4**	1	0	0
2021	DAL	7	7	21	16	5	3.0	0	**1**	**40**	**40.0**	**40**	**1**	5	2	0	0	0
2022	DAL	17	17	**65**	**43**	22	6.0	0	0	0	0.0	0	0	3	3	2	19	1
2023	DAL	17	17	50	29	21	4.0	0	0	0	0.0	0	0	**6**	1	0	0	0
2024	DAL	4	4	14	7	7	3.0	0	0	0	0.0	0	0	0	1	0	0	0
2025	SEA	16	16	53	24	**29**	6.0	0	0	0	0.0	0	0	1	3	**3**	**56**	**2**
2026	SEA	6	6	12	7	5	0.0	0	0	0	0.0	0	0	2	0	0	0	0
Career		163	145	515	316	199	67.5	1	2	53	26.5	40	1	23	24	11	80	3

==== Postseason ====
Year	Team	Games		Tackles				Interceptions						Fumbles			
Year	Team	GP	GS	Cmb	Solo	Ast	Sck	Int	Yds	Avg	Lng	TD	PD	FF	FR	Yds	TD
2014	DAL	2	0	3	3	0	**2.0**	0	0	0.0	0	0	0	1	**2**	0	0
2016	DAL	1	0	3	2	1	0.0	0	0	0.0	0	0	0	0	0	0	0
2018	DAL	2	2	**9**	**6**	**3**	0.0	0	0	0.0	0	0	0	0	0	0	0
2021	DAL	1	1	4	2	2	0.0	0	0	0.0	0	0	0	0	0	0	0
2022	DAL	2	2	6	4	2	1.0	0	0	0.0	0	0	0	0	0	0	0
2023	DAL	1	1	4	1	**3**	0.0	0	0	0.0	0	0	0	0	0	0	0
2025	SEA	3	3	7	**6**	1	**2.0**	0	0	0.0	0	0	**2**	**3**	0	0	0
Career		12	9	36	24	12	5.0	0	0	0.0	0	0	2	4	2	0	0

=== College ===
Season	Team	Class	GP	Tackles					Interceptions					Fumbles			
Season	Team	Class	GP	Cmb	Solo	Ast	TfL	Sck	Int	Yds	Lng	TD	PD	FF	FR	Yds	TD
2012	Boise State	SO	11	48	24	24	13.5	9.5	**1**	**8**	**8**	0	0	0	0	0	0
2013	Boise State	JR	12	**72**	**39**	**33**	**20.5**	**10.5**	0	0	0	0	**1**	**3**	0	0	0
Career			23	120	63	57	34.0	20.0	1	8	8	0	1	3	0	0	0
