= Jan Tankersley =

American politician from Georgia

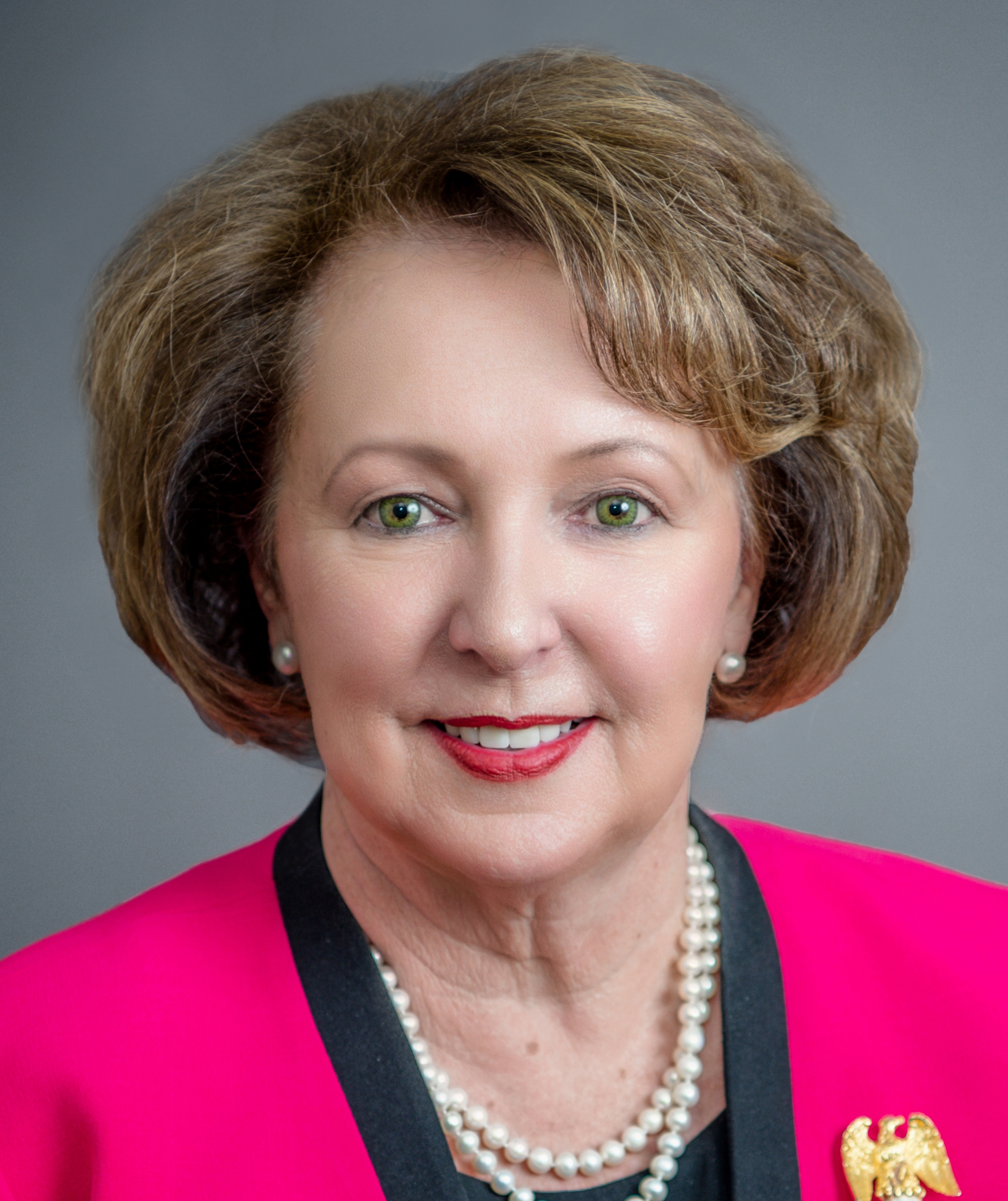

Member of the Georgia House of Representatives
- In office January 10, 2011 – January 9, 2023
- Preceded by: Bob Lane
- Succeeded by: Lehman Franklin
- Constituency: 158th district(2011–2013); 160th district (2013–2023)

Personal details
- Born: January 12, 1948 (age 78)
- Party: Republican
- Spouse: Hughie
- Profession: Retired

Jan B. Tankersley (born January 12, 1948) is an American politician from the state of Georgia. A Republican, she served in the Georgia House of Representatives from 2011 to 2023 and was redistricted in 2013 to District 160 in the Georgia House of Representatives. She served on the House Agricultural and Consumer Affairs Committee, Intragovernmental Coordination Committee, and the Natural Resources and Environment Committee.

Prior to serving in the State House, Tankersley was both a Bulloch County Commissioner and a member of the Brooklet, Georgia city council.

Georgia House of Representatives
Preceded by Bob Lane	Member of the Georgia House of Representatives from the 158th district 2011–2013	Succeeded by Butch Parrish
Preceded by Bob Bryant	Member of the Georgia House of Representatives from the 160th district 2013–2023	Succeeded by Lehman Franklin
