= Statesboro High School =

Public high school in the Statesboro, Georgia, United States

Location
- 10 Coach Lee Hill Blvd; Statesboro, Georgia 30458; United States; 32°26′39″N 81°45′45″W

Information
- Type: Public
- Established: 1901 (125 years ago)
- School district: Bulloch County School District
- CEEB code: 112805
- Principal: Keith Wright
- Staff: 101.30 (FTE)
- Grades: 9-12
- Enrollment: 1,773 (2023-2024)
- Student to teacher ratio: 17.50
- Colors: Navy, gray, and white
- Nickname: Blue Devils
- Website: shs.bulloch.k12.ga.us

Statesboro High School is a public high school located in the city of Statesboro, Georgia, United States. It was founded in 1906.

Its current principal is Keith Wright

The school completed construction on a new $1.2 million state-of-the-art building in 2009, and the new football stadium, Womack Field, was completed in the fall of 2007.

== History ==
Statesboro High was founded in 1901 with the original school house, a wooden structure, being built on Grady Street in Statesboro. The second Statesboro High School building, a brick structure, was built alongside the original in 1922. The original wooden building was still used until the late 1960s, when both buildings were destroyed by a fire.

The original part of the current building on Lester Road was completed in the summer of 1964. Renovations and additions to the building have continued over the years. The first class graduated from the new Statesboro High School in June 1965.

The current $4.2 million building began construction in 2007 and was completed in 2009. The first class graduated from the new building in May 2009.

== Odyssey of the Mind ==
Statesboro High's Odyssey of the Mind problem one team finished in second place at the 2011 World Finals, and finished second again at the 2012 World Finals.

== Athletics ==
Statesboro High School is well known for its athletics. Statesboro High School is currently part of the Georgia High School Association AAAAAA athletic division. Its varsity teams include football, women's and men's basketball, women's and men's track and field, women's and men's cross country, baseball, women's and men's soccer, women's and men's tennis, women's and men's swimming, competitive cheerleading, women's and men's golf, softball, women's volleyball, and wrestling.

=== State Titles ===
- Boys' Basketball (2) - 1968(A), 1991(4A)
- Football (5) - 1956(A), 1957(A), 1966(A), 2001(4A), 2005(4A)
- Boys' Golf (1) - 1957(A)
- Boys' Track (1) - 1961(A)

== Notable alumni ==
- Joey Hamilton (class of 1988), former professional baseball player (San Diego Padres, Toronto Blue Jays, Cincinnati Reds)
- Justin Houston (class of 2007), defensive end for the University of Georgia (2007-2010) and current linebacker for the Baltimore Ravens
- Bubba Lewis (class of 2007), actor, star of the MTV series The Inbetweeners
- Dylan Marlowe (class of 2015) American country music singer
- Jeremy Mincey (class of 2002), defensive lineman for University of Florida and defensive lineman for the Denver Broncos
- DeAngelo Tyson (class of 2008), defensive lineman for the University of Georgia (2008–2011) and former defensive lineman for the Baltimore Ravens
