= Splash in the Boro =

Water park in Georgia, United States

- Interactive map of Splash in the Boro
- Location: Bulloch County, Georgia, U.S.
- Coordinates: 32.4509°N 81.7380°W
- Opened: June 2004
- Owner: Bulloch County, Georgia
- Operating season: May through September
- Area: 155 acres (630,000 m^{2})

Attractions
- Total: 9; including Lazy River
- Website: www.splashintheboro.com

Splash in the Boro is a water park and family aquatics center located in Statesboro, Georgia. The facility is situated within Mill Creek Regional Park and is operated by the Statesboro-Bulloch County Parks and Recreation Department.

== History ==
The initial concepts for a family aquatics center in Statesboro, Georgia, were formulated by Mike Rollins, director of the Statesboro-Bulloch County Department of Parks and Recreation. Concerned about the operating expenses of the then current aquatics facilities and pools, Rollins believed the county government could build a water park that would become a self-sustaining endeavor covering its operating expenses. The plan was included as part of a Special Purpose Local Option Sales Tax (SPLOST) referendum in 2002. The $4.5 million waterpark opened in 2004. In the first summer of operation, 90,000 people visited the park, exceeding initial estimates and expectations. In 2009, Splash in the Boro added a $4 million expansion, including additional attractions and park amenities.

== Attractions ==
The park has a number of water environments. Included within the park is an 800-foot (240 m) pool that simulates a river and encircles the play and leisure pools. The park also contains 25-meter lane pool and a 24,000-square-foot (2,200 m^{2}) heated therapy pool. These pools are open throughout the year with the assistance of a portable dome structure that encloses the area immediately surrounding the pools. The park also provides concessions with seating areas. Restrooms with family change areas and lockers are located within the facility.
