= WPMX =

- Millen, Georgia; United States
- Frequency: 94.9 MHz
- Branding: Eagle 94.9

Programming
- Format: Adult contemporary
- Affiliations: Jones Radio Network

Ownership
- Owner: Neal Ardman; (Radio Statesboro, Inc.)

History
- First air date: December 4, 1989 (as WMKO)
- Former call signs: WMKO (1989–1994); WHKN (1994–2018)

Technical information
- Licensing authority: FCC
- Facility ID: 54511
- Class: C3
- ERP: 14,500 watts
- HAAT: 122 meters
- Transmitter coordinates: 32°43′57.00″N 81°51′43.00″W

Links
- Public license information: Public file; LMS
- Website: WPMX Facebook

WPMX (94.9 FM) is a radio station broadcasting an adult contemporary format. Licensed to Millen, Georgia, United States, the station is currently owned by Neal Ardman, through licensee Radio Statesboro, Inc. It features programming from Jones Radio Network.

== History ==
The station went on the air as WMKO on 1989-09-20. On 1994-02-04, the station changed its call sign to WHKN. The station swapped call signs with sister station WPMX on August 9, 2018.
