= Southeast Bulloch High School =

Public high school in Brooklet, Georgia, United States

Location
- 9184 Brooklet/Denmark Highway; Brooklet address, Georgia 30458; United States
- 32°21′46″N 81°40′44″W

Information
- Type: Public secondary
- Motto: Schmagubes!
- Established: 1955 (71 years ago)
- School district: Bulloch County School District
- CEEB code: 110460
- Principal: Nate Pennington
- Staff: 61.70 (FTE)
- Grades: 9–12
- Enrollment: 1,156 (2022-23)
- Student to teacher ratio: 18.74
- Colors: Blue and gold
- Mascot: Yellow Jacket
- Website: sbhs.bulloch.k12.ga.us

Southeast Bulloch High School is located in unincorporated Bulloch County, Georgia, United States, at 9184 Brooklet/Denmark Highway, with a Brooklet postal address. Its student population as of the 2007–08 school year was 865 students and 47 faculty members.

The school started in a new building in 2007.

Its principal is Nate Pennington, succeeding Dr. Julie Mizell.

== Demographics ==
865 students were enrolled in the 2007–2008 school year. The student body was 2% Asian, 16% African American, 1% Hispanic, 0% Native American/Alaskan, 82% White, and 1% multiracial. 16% of students had disabilities and 36% were eligible for free/reduced meals.

== Sports ==
The school offers varsity sports in soccer, basketball, football, baseball, softball, swimming, cheerleading, track and field/cross country, and tennis.

Southeast Bulloch holds two state championships in football (1972 and 1973), and two state championships (1994 and 1995) and six region championships in competitive cheerleading. The football program ended a 48-year playoff drought in 2021.

The school won a GHSA state Flag Football championship in (2021). They were Division 1 GHSA state champions in 2022 and again in 2023.

== Testing results ==
In the 2007–2008 school year the GHSGT (Georgia High School Graduation Test) results were as follows:

- English/Lang. Arts - Pass Plus 55%, pass 36%, fail 10%
- Mathematics - Pass Plus 53%, pass 40%, fail 7%
- Social Studies - Pass Plus 42%, pass 45%, fail 14%
- Science - Pass Plus 51%, pass 36%, fail 13%

The GHSWT (Georgia High School Writing Test) results were 89% passing and 11% failing.
