= Statesboro, Georgia =

City in Georgia, United States

- City
- From top to bottom left to right: The Bulloch County Courthouse and Averitt Center for the Arts, Splash in the Boro Water Park, Campus of Georgia Southern University, the Emma Kelly Theater

- Flag Seal

- Location in Bulloch County, Georgia

- Location within Georgia Location within the United States
- Coordinates: 32°26′43″N 81°46′45″W
- Country: United States
- State: Georgia
- County: Bulloch

Government
  - Mayor: Jonathan McCollar (D)

Area
  - City: 15.31 sq mi (39.64 km^{2})
  - Land: 15.00 sq mi (38.84 km^{2})
  - Water: 0.31 sq mi (0.81 km^{2})
- Elevation: 253 ft (77 m)

Population (2020)
  - City: 33,438
  - Density: 2,229.9/sq mi (860.97/km^{2})
  - Metro: 71,214 (US: 95th)
- Time zone: UTC-5 (EST)
  - Summer (DST): UTC-4 (EDT)
- ZIP codes: 30458-30461
- Area code: 912
- FIPS code: 13-73256
- GNIS feature ID: 0323541
- Website: statesboroga.gov

Statesboro is the most populous city in and the county seat of Bulloch County, Georgia, United States. Located in the southeastern part of the state, its population was 33,438 at the 2020 census. It is the principal city of the Statesboro micropolitan area, which had 81,099 residents, and is part of the Savannah–Hinesville–Statesboro combined statistical area.

The city was chartered in 1803, starting as a small trading community providing basic essentials for surrounding cotton plantations. This drove the economy throughout the 19th century, both before and after the American Civil War. In 1906, Statesboro was selected as the home of the First District A&M School, a land grant college that eventually developed into Georgia Southern University.

Statesboro inspired the blues song "Statesboro Blues", written by Blind Willie McTell in the 1920s, and covered in a well-known version by the Allman Brothers Band. In 2017, Statesboro was selected in the top three of the national America's Best Communities competition and was named one of nine Georgia "live, work, play" cities by the Georgia Municipal Association.

== History ==
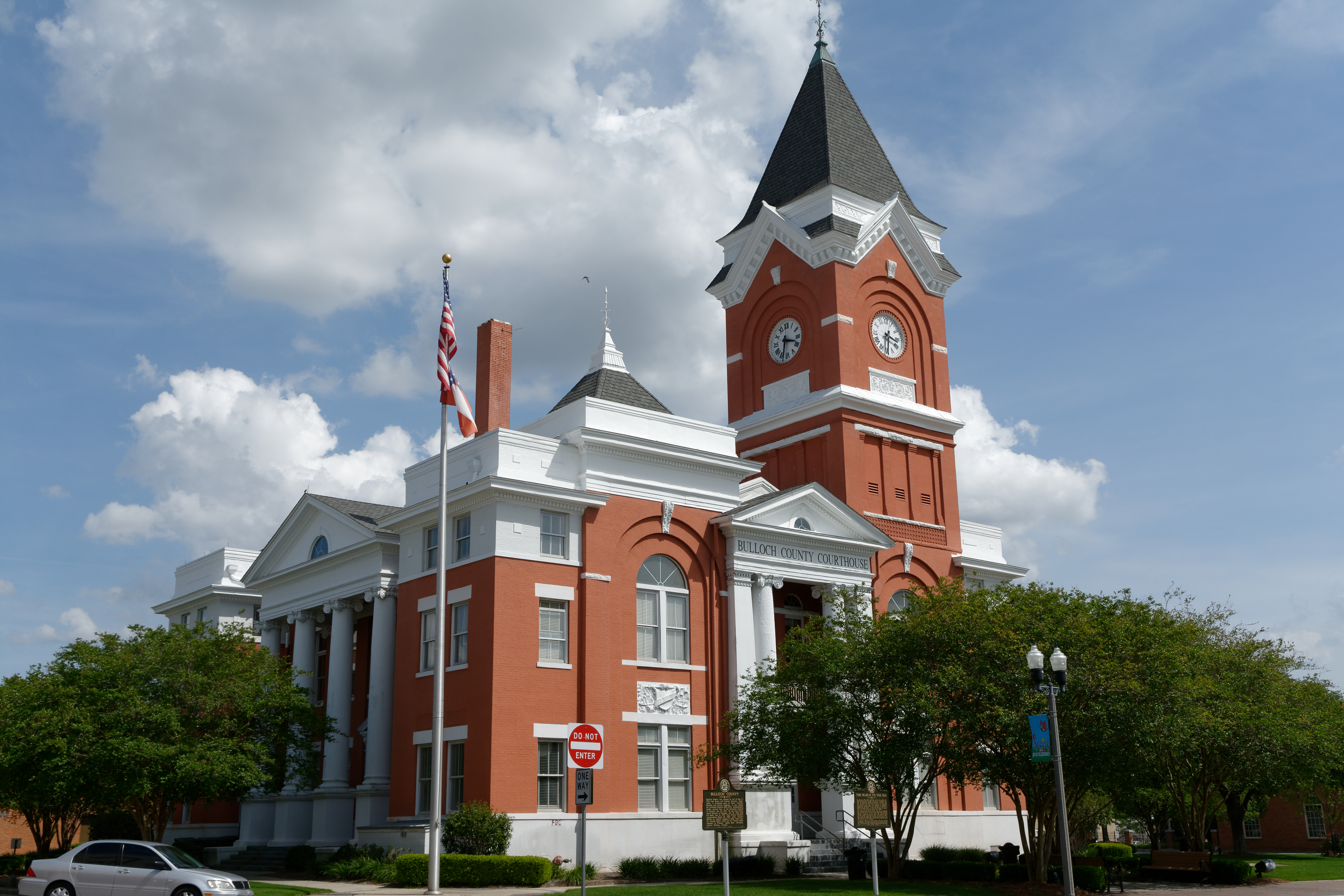
Bulloch County Courthouse

In 1801, George Sibbald of Augusta donated a 9,301-acre (37.64 km^{2}) tract for a centrally located county seat for the growing agricultural community of Bulloch County. The area was developed by white planters largely for cotton plantations that were worked by black slave labor. In December 1803, the Georgia legislature created the town of Statesborough. The community most likely was named after the notion of states' rights, an issue central in the 1800 United States presidential election. In 1866 the state legislature granted a permanent charter to the city, changing the spelling of its name to the present "Statesboro."

During the Civil War and General William T. Sherman's famous March to the Sea through Georgia, a Union officer asked a saloon proprietor for directions to Statesboro. The proprietor replied, "You are standing in the middle of town," indicating its small size. The soldiers destroyed the courthouse, a log structure that doubled as a barn when court was not in session. After the Civil War, the small town began to grow, and Statesboro has developed as a major town in southeastern Georgia. Many freedmen stayed in the area, working on plantations as sharecroppers and tenant farmers.

Following the Reconstruction era, racial violence of whites against blacks increased. In the era from 1880 to 1930, Georgia had the highest rate of lynchings of any state in the nation. Among them were three black men who were lynched and burned to death on August 16, 1904, near Statesboro. A fourth man was lynched later in the month in Bulloch County. After a white farm family was killed, the white community spread unfounded rumors of black clergy urging blacks to commit violence against whites, and more than twelve black men were arrested in this case.

Paul Reed and Will Cato were convicted of the Hodge family murders by an all-white jury and sentenced to death on August 16, 1904, but they were abducted that day from the courthouse by a lynch mob and brutally burned to death. Handy Bell, another suspect, was lynched and burned by a mob that night. White violence against blacks did not end; both men and women were physically attacked on the streets. Two more black men were lynched in August 1904: Sebastian McBride in Portal, another town in Bulloch County, and A.L. Scott in Wilcox County.

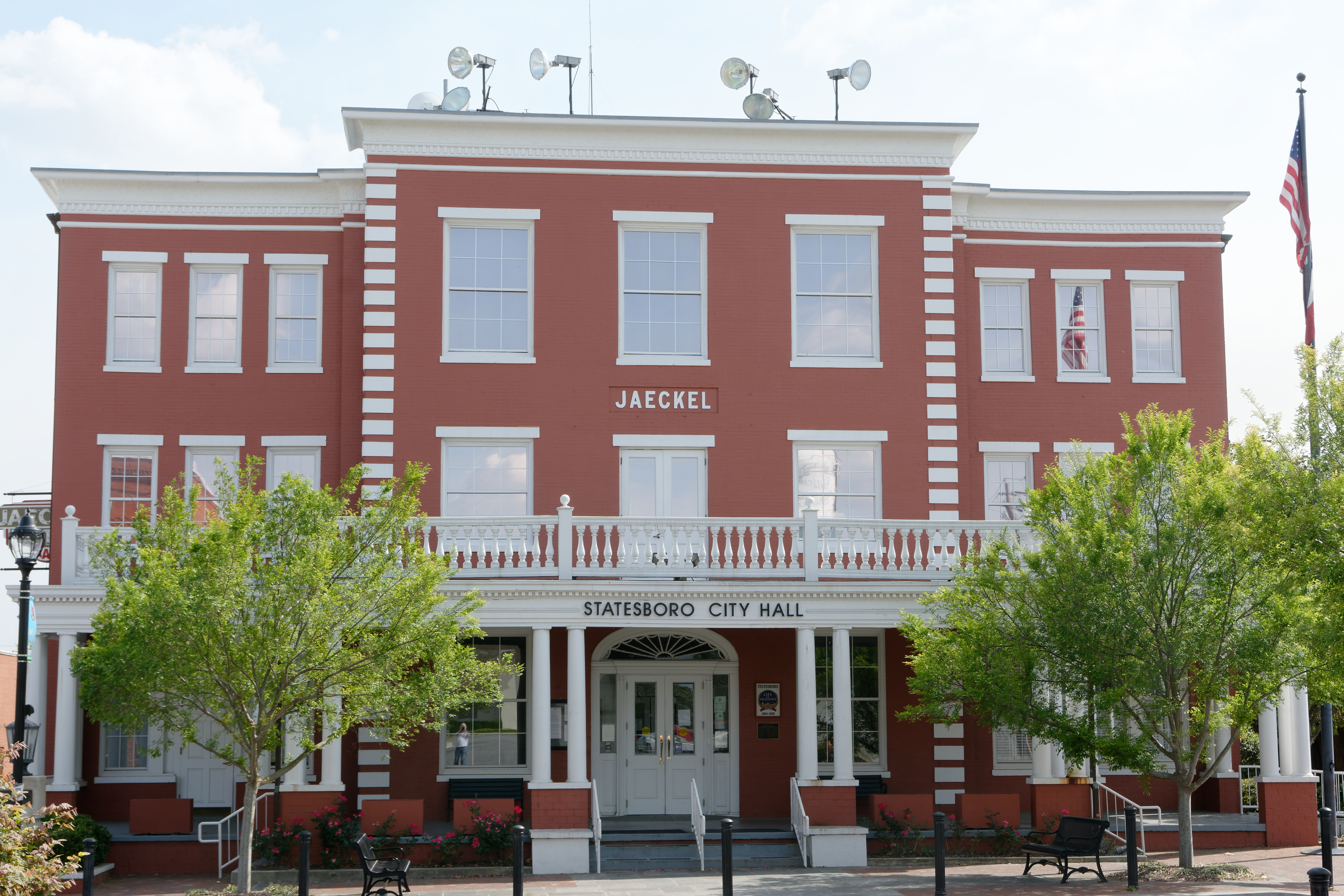
Statesboro City Hall, located downtown in the renovated Jaeckel Hotel building. The hotel served as the center of local social life in the early part of the 20th century.

To escape oppression and violence, many African Americans left Statesboro and Bulloch County altogether, causing local businessmen to worry about labor shortages in the cotton and turpentine industries. African Americans made a Great Migration from the rural South to northern cities in the first half of the 20th century. Local effects can be seen in the drop in Statesboro population growth from 1910 to 1930 on the census tables below in the "Demographics" section.

Around the turn of the century, new businesses in Statesboro included stores and banks built along North, East, South, and West Main streets. In 1908, Statesboro led the world in sales of long-staple Sea Island Cotton, a specialty of the Low Country. Mechanization of agriculture decreased the need for some farm labor. After the boll weevil destroyed the cotton crop in the 1930s, farmers shifted to tobacco. The insect had invaded the South from the west, disrupting cotton cultivation throughout the region. By 1953, however, more than 20 million pounds of tobacco passed through warehouses in Statesboro, then the largest market of the "Bright Tobacco Belt" spanning Georgia and Florida.

The 1906 First District Agricultural & Mechanical School at Statesboro was developed as a land grant college, initiated by federal legislation to support education. Its mission shifted in the 1920s to teacher training; and in 1924 it was renamed as the Georgia Normal School. With expansion of the curriculum to a 4-year program, it was renamed as the South Georgia Teachers College in 1929. Other name changes were to Georgia Teachers College in 1939, and Georgia Southern College in 1959. After this period, it became racially integrated and with development of graduate programs and research in numerous fields, since 1990 it has had university status as Georgia Southern University.

In March of 2025, Statesboro Chief of Police Charles "Mike" Broadhead announced a full staff of 79 sworn officers.

== Geography ==
Statesboro is located at 32°26′43″N 81°46′45″W (32.445147, -81.779234). The city is located in southeastern Georgia along U.S. Routes 80, 25, and 301. US 80 runs northwest to southeast through the city, leading southeast 58 mi (93 km) to Savannah and west-northwest 37 mi (60 km) to Swainsboro. US 25 and 301 run concurrently through the center of town and split upon their junction with US 80, leading south 12 mi (19 km) to Interstate 16 at exit 116. US 25 leads north 29 mi (47 km) to Millen and US 301 north 24 mi (39 km) to Sylvania.

According to the United States Census Bureau, the city has a total area of 13.9 square miles (35.9 km^{2}), of which 13.5 square miles (35.0 km^{2}) is land and 0.35 square miles (0.9 km^{2}), or 2.60%, is water. The city is in the coastal plain region, or Low Country, of Georgia, so it is mainly flat with a few small hills. With an elevation of 250 feet (76 m), the downtown area is one of the highest places in Bulloch County. Pine, oak, magnolia, dogwood, palm, sweetgum, and a variety of other trees can be found in the area.

=== Climate ===
Statesboro has a humid subtropical climate, according to the Köppen classification. The city experiences very hot and humid summers with average July highs of about 91 °F (33 °C) and lows around 70 °F (21 °C). Afternoon thunderstorms associated with the summer heat and humidity can spawn from time to time. Winters are mild, with average January highs of 58 °F (14 °C) and lows of 36 °F (2 °C). Winter storms are rare, but they happen periodically, the most recent in January 2025 that left 3-4 inches (7.6-10.2 cm) of snow on the ground. Snowfall also occurred on February 12, 2010 and January 3, 2018, with approximately 2 inches (5.1 cm) and 3 inches (8.9 cm) of snow falling on the city, respectively.

== Demographics ==
Historical population
Census	Pop.	Note	%±
1870	33		—
1880	29		−12.1%
1890	425		1,365.5%
1900	1,197		181.6%
1910	2,529		111.3%
1920	3,807		50.5%
1930	3,996		5.0%
1940	5,028		25.8%
1950	6,097		21.3%
1960	8,356		37.1%
1970	14,616		74.9%
1980	14,866		1.7%
1990	15,854		6.6%
2000	22,698		43.2%
2010	28,422		25.2%
2020	33,438		17.6%
2025 (est.)	35,366	▲	5.8%
U.S. Decennial Census; 2025

=== 2020 census ===
As of the 2020 census, Statesboro had a population of 33,438. The median age was 22.6 years. 15.8% of residents were under the age of 18 and 8.2% of residents were 65 years of age or older. For every 100 females there were 92.5 males, and for every 100 females age 18 and over there were 91.6 males age 18 and over.

99.9% of residents lived in urban areas, while 0.1% lived in rural areas.

There were 12,518 households in Statesboro, of which 21.9% had children under the age of 18 living in them. There were 4,569 families residing in the city. Of all households, 17.4% were married-couple households, 33.1% were households with a male householder and no spouse or partner present, and 41.9% were households with a female householder and no spouse or partner present. About 37.6% of all households were made up of individuals and 7.5% had someone living alone who was 65 years of age or older.

There were 14,206 housing units, of which 11.9% were vacant. The homeowner vacancy rate was 1.5% and the rental vacancy rate was 9.4%.

Racial composition as of the 2020 census
Race	Number	Percent
White	16,775	50.2%
Black or African American	13,507	40.4%
American Indian and Alaska Native	86	0.3%
Asian	649	1.9%
Native Hawaiian and Other Pacific Islander	43	0.1%
Some other race	767	2.3%
Two or more races	1,611	4.8%
Hispanic or Latino (of any race)	1,930	5.8%

== Economy ==
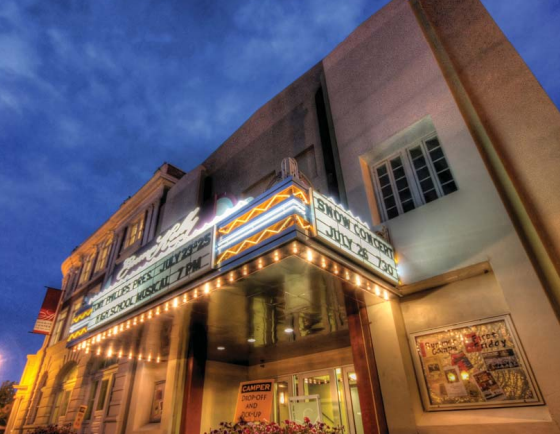
Emma Kelly Theater

The economy of Statesboro is based on education, manufacturing, and agribusiness sectors. Statesboro serves as a regional economic hub and has more than one billion dollars in annual retail sales. Georgia Southern University is the largest employer in the city, with 6,700 regional jobs tied directly and indirectly to the campus.

Agriculture is responsible for $100 million in annual farm gate revenues.

Statesboro is home to multiple manufacturing facilities. Statesboro Briggs & Stratton Plant is the third-largest employer in the region with 950 employees.

The Development Authority of Bulloch County retains over 100 acres (40 ha) of GRAD (Georgia Ready for Accelerated Development) land at the Gateway Industrial Park. Southern Gateway Park is a newly developed 200-acre (81 ha) tract located at the intersection of U.S. 301 and Interstate 16 in close proximity to the Court of Savannah. Southern Gateway is served by municipal water, sewer and natural gas lines.

GAF, the largest privately owned roofing manufacturer in North America, relocated to Statesboro in the early 21st century.

== Arts and culture ==
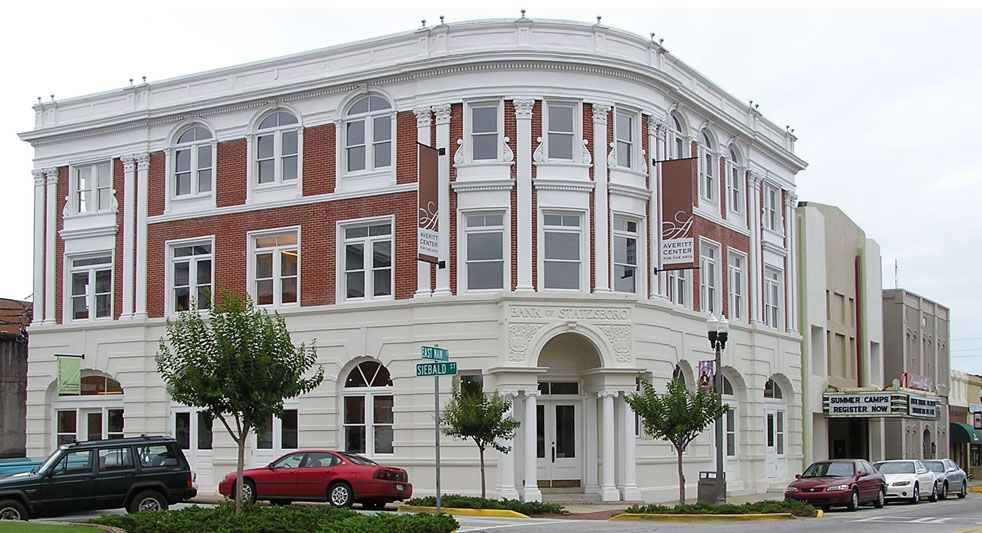
Averitt Center for the Arts

The culture of Statesboro reflects a blend of both its southern heritage and college town identity.

Statesboro has a culture shaped in part by the presence of Georgia Southern University and its student population. The university contributes to the city’s arts, music, and intellectual life, while local businesses provide a range of restaurants, bars, live music venues, bookstores, and coffee shops that serve both students and the wider community.

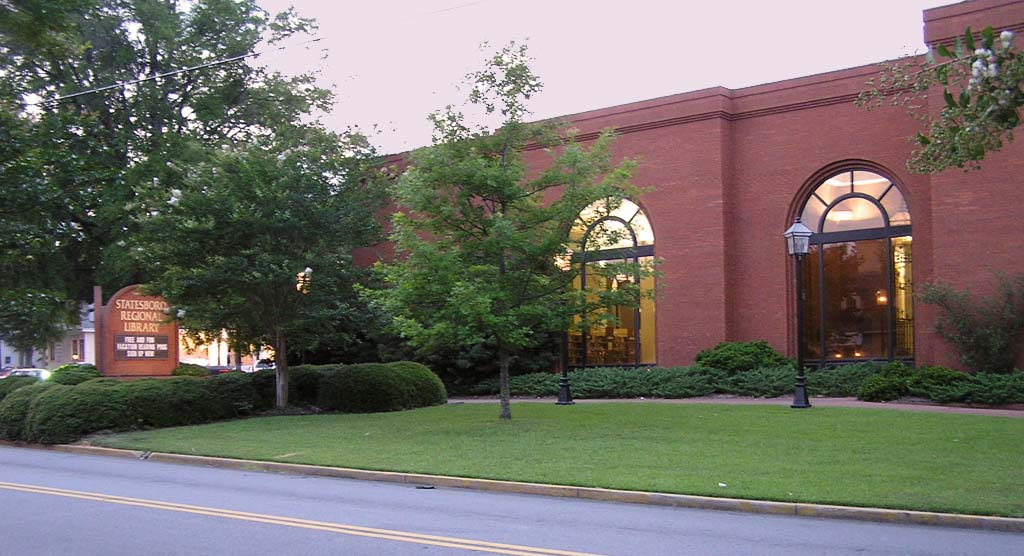
The Statesboro Regional Library, part of the Georgia PINES library network

Statesboro's downtown was named one of eight "Renaissance Cities" by Georgia Trend magazine. The downtown area is currently undergoing a revitalization. The Old Bank of Statesboro and Georgia Theater have been adapted with renovation for the David H. Averitt Center for the Arts. It houses the Emma Kelly Theater, named after the local singer, known as the "Lady of 6,000 Songs". The center also contains art studios, conference rooms and an exhibition area. Downtown Statesboro has been featured in several motion pictures including Now and Then (1995) as well as 1969. Georgia Southern offers a variety of cultural options available both for the university and the wider community: the Georgia Southern Symphony, the Georgia Southern Planetarium, Georgia Southern Museum, and the Botanical Gardens at Bland Cottage. Touring groups appear at the Performing Arts Center, and also featured are shows put on by Georgia Southern students and faculty.

Mill Creek Regional Park is a large outdoor recreational facility with athletic fields and a water park, Splash in the Boro.

== Sports ==
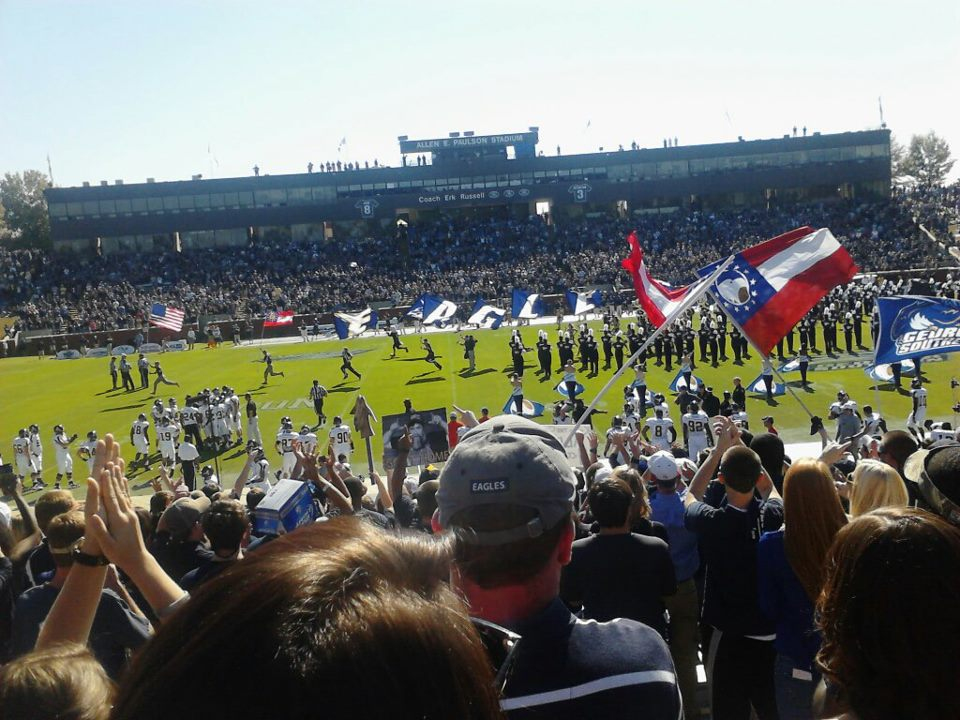
Paulson Stadium

=== Georgia Southern Eagles ===
The Georgia Southern University Eagles field 17 varsity teams in the Division I Football Bowl Subdivision (FBS) and are members of the NCAA Division I Sun Belt Conference.

Prior to joining the Sun Belt Conference in 2014, the Eagles were members of the Trans America Athletic Conference (presently known as the ASUN Conference) and the Southern Conference. During their time at the Football Championship Subdivision (FCS/I-AA) level, the Eagles football team won an unprecedented six national championships.

=== Tormenta FC ===
South Georgia Tormenta FC fields a professional team in USL League One, the third tier of the American Soccer Pyramid. The club's inaugural season was the 2016 season. Games are played at Optim Sports Medicine Field at Tormenta Stadium. The club won the USL League One championship in the 2022 season.

== Education ==
=== Higher education ===
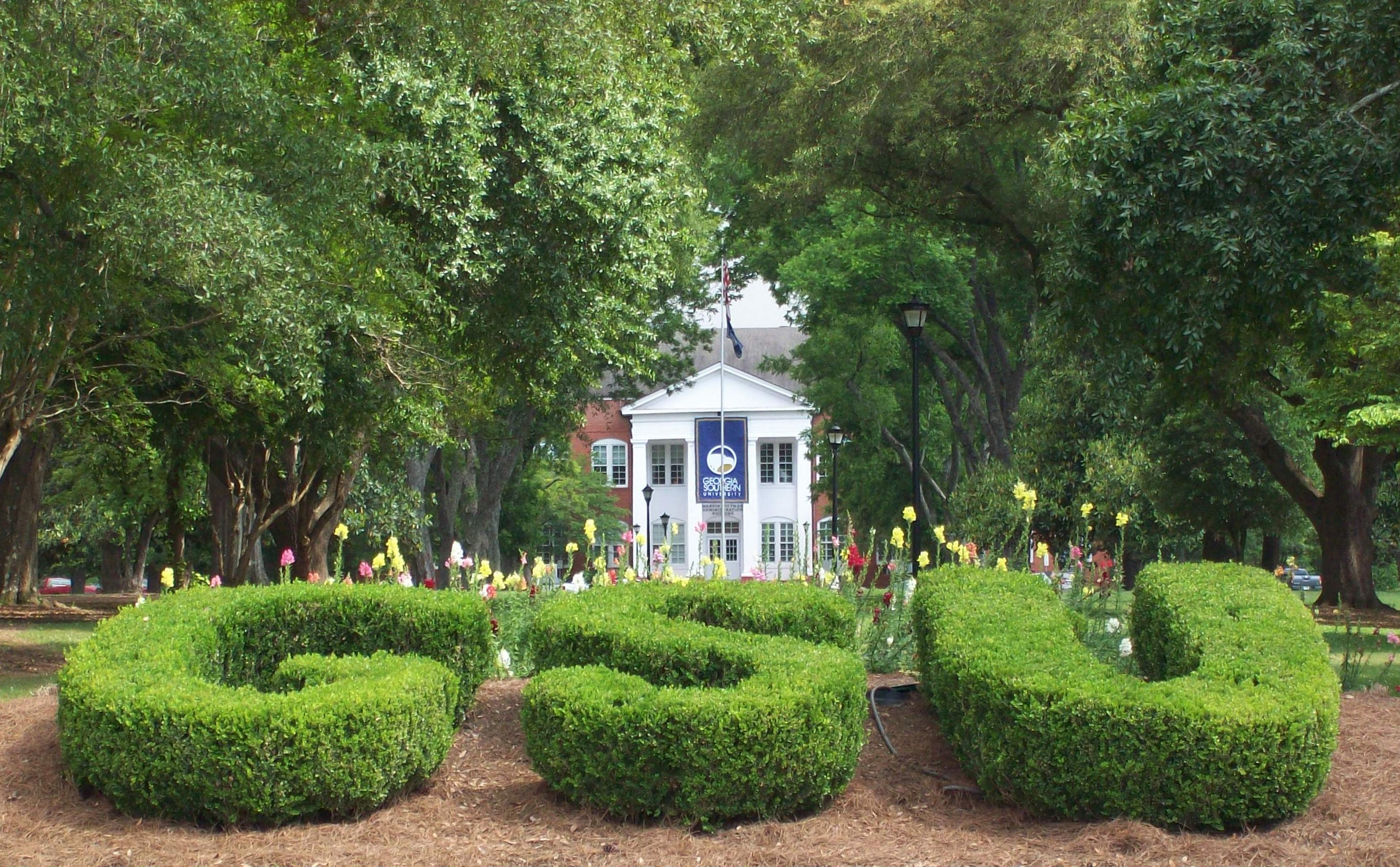
Sweetheart Circle on Georgia Southern University's campus

Georgia Southern University is the city's principal institution of higher learning. The university, a unit of the University System of Georgia (USG), was founded as the First District Agricultural and Mechanical School in 1906 as a land grant college, open only to white students. On July 1, 1990, it became the fifth university of the University System, and as of 2015 is a comprehensive residential university of nearly 20,000 students. The university's graduate programs are offered on campus, at satellite centers, and by distance and on-line delivery. For the past decade, the university has combined a capital building program with beautification of the nearly 700-acre (2.8 km^{2}) campus. The university facilities include a museum of cultural and natural history, a botanical garden, and a center for wildlife education located within the campus grounds. The university's Division I athletic teams, the Georgia Southern Eagles, compete in the Sun Belt Conference.

Ogeechee Technical College (OTC) is a part of the Technical College System of Georgia, providing technical and adult education to area students; OTC is located on U.S. Highway 301 South, outside of the city limits and approximately 4 miles (6 km) southwest of Georgia Southern's campus.

=== Bulloch County School District ===
The Bulloch County Board of Education runs the public school district in Statesboro. Schools in the city limits include Julia P. Bryant Elementary School, Mattie Lively Elementary School, Mill Creek Elementary School, Sallie Zetterower Elementary School, and Statesboro High School.

Other public schools in the county include Southeast Bulloch High School, William James Middle School, Langston Chapel Middle School, Southeast Bulloch Middle School, and Langston Chapel Elementary School.

The Charter Conservatory for Liberal Arts and Technology, part of the CCAT public school district, is a charter school located within the city limits. In 2016 CCAT was renamed Statesboro STEAM – College, Careers, Arts, & Technology Academy.

Bulloch Academy is outside of the city limits. Other private schools in the area include Trinity Christian School and Bible Baptist Christian School.

== Media ==
Statesboro is served by a variety of media outlets in print, radio, television, and the Internet. Statesboro Magazine is the community's premier quality of life publication. The local newspaper is the Statesboro Herald, a daily with a circulation of about 6,000. Other newspapers include the George-Anne produced by Georgia Southern University students, Connect Statesboro, a weekly entertainment publication, and the E11eventh Hour, a twice-a-month entertainment publication. Radio stations include WHKN, WMCD, WPMX, WPTB, WWNS, and WVGS. Statesboro Business Magazine offers Statesboro and area business news, articles, features, jobs, real estate listings and other area business information and reviews.

StatesboroHerald.com has received numerous state and national awards from the newspaper industry for online innovation.

== Infrastructure ==
=== Hospitals ===
- East Georgia Regional Medical Center
- Willingway Hospital

=== Transportation ===
==== Airports ====
Approximately 3 miles (5 km) outside of Statesboro is the Statesboro-Bulloch County Airport, which can accommodate private aircraft but does not have a control tower or commercial flights. Most travelers use the nearby Savannah/Hilton Head International Airport, which is located 45 miles (72 km) to the east and is served by eight commercial airlines. Statesboro is about three hours by highway from the major Hartsfield–Jackson Atlanta International Airport.

==== Highways ====
Interstate 16 is located 10 miles (16 km) to the south of Statesboro. Statesboro is also served by three U.S. highways: U.S. Highway 301, which runs north–south through the city, U.S. Highway 25, which runs northwest–south through the city, and U.S. Highway 80, which is the main east–west route through the city. The Veterans Memorial Parkway (Highway 301 Bypass and Highway 25 Bypass) forms a near circle around the city.

U.S. Routes:

- U.S. Route 25
- U.S. Route 80
- U.S. Route 301

State Routes:

- State Route 24
- State Route 26
- State Route 67

==== Pedestrians and cycling ====
- S&S Greenway Trail

- Blind Willie McTell Trail

==== Rail ====
Rail service for freight is provided by Norfolk Southern Railway.

== Notable people ==
- Jason Childers (born 1975), Major League Baseball relief pitcher
- Berry Avant Edenfield, United States District Court judge and Georgia State Senator
- Dale Eggeling (born 1954), golfer, winner of three LPGA Tour events
- Sutton Foster (born 1975), Broadway star, two-time Tony Award winner
- Waldo Grant, serial killer
- Joey Hamilton (born 1970), retired Major League Baseball player
- Margie Hendrix (1935–1973), singer of Ray Charles Robinson Raelettes, member of The Cookies girl group, solo recording artist
- Justin Houston (born 1989), linebacker for the Kansas City Chiefs
- Emma Kelly (1918–2001), pianist
- Sharma Lewis (born 1963), African American United Methodist bishop
- Dylan Marlowe (born 1999), American country music singer
- Danny McBride (born 1976), actor, Pineapple Express, Eastbound & Down, The Righteous Gemstones
- Jeremy Mincey (born 1983), defensive end for Dallas Cowboys
- Blind Willie McTell (1901–1959), blues musician, composed "Statesboro Blues"
- Adrian Peterson (born 1979), former running back for Chicago Bears, Walter Payton Award winner who earned degree from Georgia Southern University in 2001 and helped win 1999 and 2000 National Championships
- Marty Pevey (born 1961), current manager of Iowa Cubs, Triple A affiliate of Chicago Cubs
- Commander William M. Rigdon, USN (1904–1991), assistant Naval Aide in White House, 1942–53; served throughout Presidency of Harry S. Truman
- John Rocker, Major League baseball relief pitcher
- Erk Russell (1926–2006), college football coach
- Lindsay Thomas, lived in Statesboro while serving in the United States House of Representatives.
- DeAngelo Tyson (born 1989), defensive end, Baltimore Ravens
- Rashad Wright (born 1982), basketball point guard

== Points of interest ==
- Georgia Southern Botanical Garden
- Georgia Southern University
- J. I. Clements Stadium
- Mill Creek Recreational Park
- Paulson Stadium
- Splash in the Boro
- Statesboro Mall
