= 2024 Georgia House of Representatives election =

- November 5, 2024

All 180 seats in the Georgia House of Representatives 91 seats needed for a majority
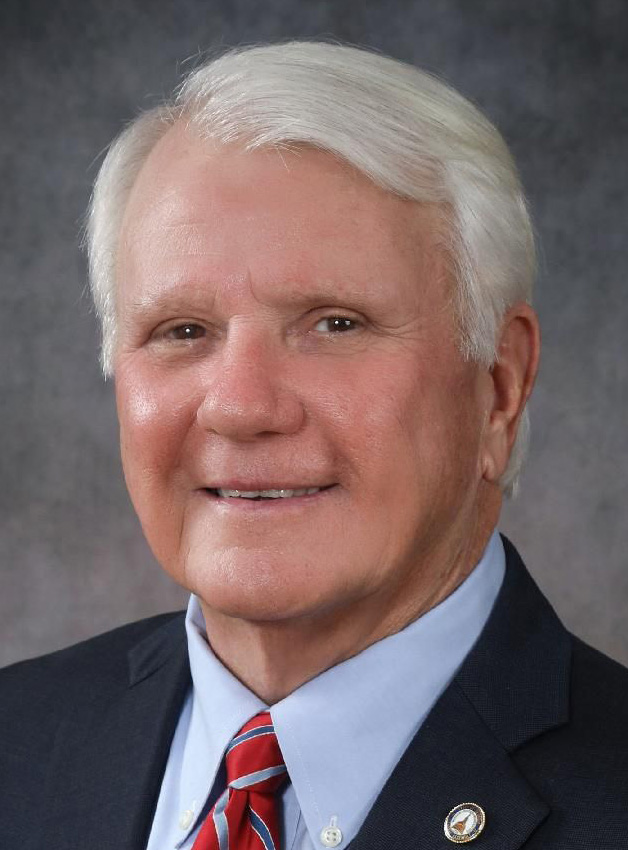

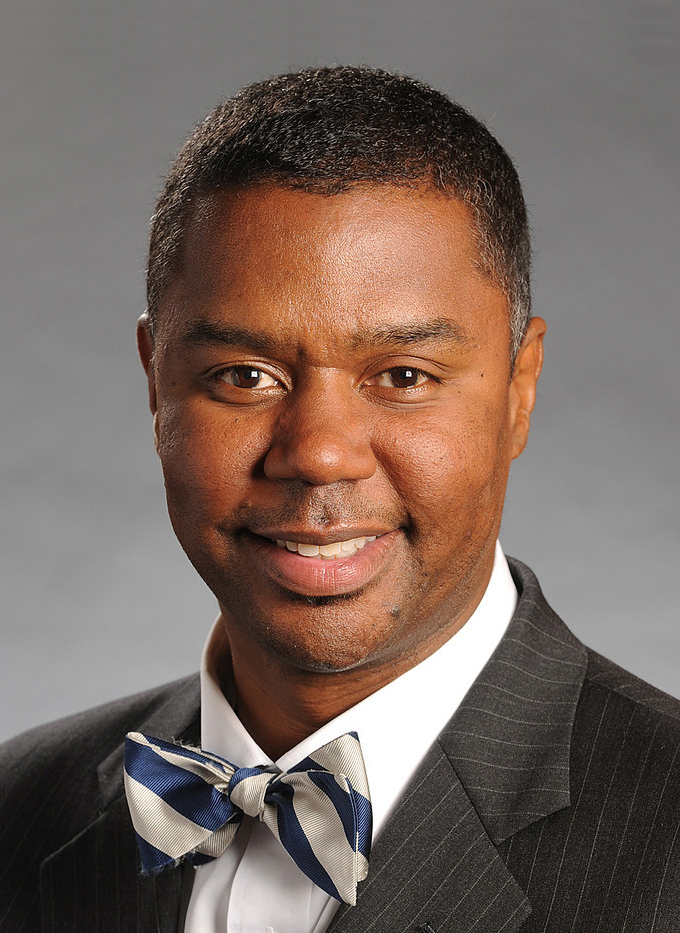
	Majority party	Minority party
Leader	Jon Burns	James Beverly (retired)
Party	Republican	Democratic
Leader since	January 9, 2023	January 11, 2021
Leader's seat	159th – Newington	143rd – Macon
Last election	101	79
Seats before	102	78
Seats won	100	80
Seat change	▼2	▲2
Popular vote	2,616,271	2,172,046
Percentage	54.64%	45.36%
Swing	▼0.61%	▲0.61%
- Republican gain Democratic gain Republican hold Democratic hold 50–60% 60–70% 70–80% 80–90% >90% 50–60% 60–70% 70–80% 80–90% >90%
Speaker before election
Jon Burns
Republican
Elected Speaker
Jon Burns
Republican

The 2024 Georgia House of Representatives elections were held on November 5, 2024. Voters in each of Georgia's 180 legislative districts elected a state representative to the Georgia House of Representatives. All 180 seats were up for election. Candidate qualifying ended on March 8, 2024. Primary elections were held on May 21, 2024.

== Incumbents retiring ==
=== Republicans ===
1. District 71: J. Collins retired.
2. District 131: Jodi Lott retired.
3. District 135: (Note: Redistricted from the 134th district.) David Knight retired.
4. District 169: Clay Pirkle retired.
5. District 170: Penny Houston retired.

=== Democrats ===
1. District 42: (Note: Redistricted from the 40th district.) Doug Stoner retired.
2. District 61: Roger Bruce retired.
3. District 65: Mandisha Thomas retired to run for U.S. representative in Georgia's 6th congressional district.
4. District 96: Pedro Marin retired.
5. District 107: (Note: Redistricted from the 101st district.) Gregg Kennard retired.
6. District 126: Gloria Frazier retired.
7. District 143: James Beverly retired.

== Incumbents defeated ==
=== In primaries ===
==== Republicans ====
1. District 81: (Note: Redistricted from the 117th district.) Lauren Daniel lost renomination to Noelle Kahaian.

==== Democrats ====
1. District 42: Teri Anulewicz lost renomination to Gabriel Sanchez.
2. District 90: Becky Evans lost renomination to fellow incumbent Saira Draper in a redistricting battle.

== Special elections ==
Eight special elections were held during the 157th Georgia General Assembly.

=== District 129 (special) ===
Representative Henry Howard died on October 13, 2022. After he posthumously won re-election, a special election was held to elect his successor.

Georgia House of Representatives 129th district special election, 2022
Party	Candidate	Votes	%
Democratic	Karlton Howard	1,810	68.38
Democratic	Brad Owens	435	16.43
Democratic	Scott Cambers	244	9.22
Democratic	Davis Green	158	5.97
Total votes		2,647	100.00
Democratic hold			

=== District 7 (special) ===
Incumbent Republican David Ralston, who was first elected in 2002, resigned on November 4, 2022.

Georgia House of Representatives 7th district special election, 2023
Party	Candidate	Votes	%
Republican	Sheree Ralston	3,583	45.00
Republican	Johnny Chastain	3,130	39.31
Republican	Justin Heitman	590	7.41
Republican	Brian K. Pritchard	490	6.15
Republican	Richie Stone	169	2.12
Total votes		7,962	100.0

Georgia House of Representatives 7th district special election runoff, 2023
Party	Candidate	Votes	%
Republican	Johnny Chastain	4,565	52.77
Republican	Sheree Ralston	4,085	47.23
Total votes		8,650	100.00
Republican hold			

=== District 119 (special) ===
Representative-elect Danny Rampey declined to be seated following his arrest on drug charges in December 2022.

Georgia House of Representatives 119th district special election, 2023
Party	Candidate	Votes	%
Republican	Holt Persinger	910	27.90
Republican	Charlie Chase	831	25.48
Republican	Bill Ritter	596	18.27
Republican	Renee Lord	406	12.45
Democratic	Shelbey Diamond-Alexander	382	11.71
Republican	Joseph Grodzicki	73	2.24
Republican	Joe Price	64	1.96
Total votes		3,262	100.00

Georgia House of Representatives 119th district special election runoff, 2023
Party	Candidate	Votes	%
Republican	Holt Persinger	1,400	59.25
Republican	Charlie Chase	963	40.75
Total votes		2,363	100.00
Republican hold			

=== District 172 (special) ===
Incumbent Republican Sam Watson resigned from his seat in December 2022 in order to run in the special election for State Senate District 11.

Georgia House of Representatives 172nd district special election, 2023
Party	Candidate	Votes	%
Republican	Charles Cannon	3,428	100.00
Total votes		3,428	100.00
Republican hold			

=== District 75 (special) ===
Incumbent Democrat Mike Glanton of District 75 resigned on January 24, 2023, for health reasons.

Georgia House of Representatives 75th district special election, 2023
Party	Candidate	Votes	%
Democratic	Eric Bell II	2,222	61.60
Democratic	Herman Andrews	975	27.03
Republican	Della Ashley	410	11.37
Total votes		3,607	100.00
Democratic hold			

=== District 68 (special) ===
Representative Tish Naghise died on March 8, 2023.

Georgia House of Representatives 68th district special election, 2023
Party	Candidate	Votes	%
Democratic	Mark Baker	645	33.13
Democratic	Derrick Jackson	628	32.25
Democratic	Taiwo Idowu	342	17.57
Democratic	Jane Williams	262	13.46
Democratic	John Culbreth	70	3.60
Total votes		1,947	100.00

Georgia House of Representatives 68th district special election runoff, 2023
Party	Candidate	Votes	%
Democratic	Derrick Jackson	918	50.41
Democratic	Mark Baker	903	49.59
Total votes		1,821	100.00
Democratic hold			

=== District 125 (special) ===
Representative Barry Fleming resigned on January 9, 2024, to serve as a superior court judge on the Columbia Judicial Circuit.

Georgia House of Representatives 125th district special election, 2024
Party	Candidate	Votes	%
Republican	Gary Richardson	1,694	37.50
Republican	CJ Pearson	1,390	30.77
Republican	Jim Steed	794	17,58
Democratic	Kay Turner	612	13.55
Libertarian	John Turpish	27	0.60
Total votes		4,517	100.00

Georgia House of Representatives 125th district special election runoff, 2024
Party	Candidate	Votes	%
Republican	Gary Richardson	3,911	60.18
Republican	CJ Pearson	2,588	39.82
Total votes		6,499	100.00
Republican hold			

=== District 139 (special) ===
Representative Richard H. Smith died on January 30, 2024.

Georgia House of Representatives 139th district special election, 2024
Party	Candidate	Votes	%
Republican	Sean Knox	1,045	42.55
Republican	Carmen Rice	1,034	42.10
Independent	Robert Mallard	237	9.65
Republican	Donald Moeller	140	5.70
Total votes		2,456	100

Georgia House of Representatives 139th district special election runoff, 2024
Party	Candidate	Votes	%
Republican	Carmen Rice	1,157	55.76
Republican	Sean Knox	918	44.24
Total votes		2,075	100.00
Republican hold			

== Predictions ==
Source	Ranking
CNalysis	Solid R

== Results summary ==
District	2020 Pres.	Incumbent				Candidates	Result
District	2020 Pres.	Member	Party	First elected	Running	Candidates	Result
1	R +57.0	Mike Cameron	Republican	2020	Yes	▌ ✓ Mike Cameron (Republican); ▌Jack Zibluk (Democratic)	Republican hold
2	R +61.3	Steve Tarvin	Republican	2014	Yes	▌ ✓ Steve Tarvin (Republican)	Republican hold
3	R +54.7	Mitchell Horner	Republican	2022	Yes	▌ ✓ Mitchell Horner (Republican)	Republican hold
4	R +23.0	Kasey Carpenter	Republican	2017 (special)	Yes	▌ ✓ Kasey Carpenter (Republican)	Republican hold
5	R +62.2	Matt Barton	Republican	2019 (special)	Yes	▌ ✓ Matt Barton (Republican)	Republican hold
6	R +66.5	Jason Ridley	Republican	2016	Yes	▌ ✓ Jason Ridley (Republican); ▌Cathy Kott (Democratic)	Republican hold
7	R +63.3	Johnny Chastain	Republican	2023 (special)	Yes	▌ ✓ Johnny Chastain (Republican)	Republican hold
8	R +63.1	Stan Gunter	Republican	2020	Yes	▌ ✓ Stan Gunter (Republican); ▌Charlotte Sleczkowski (Democratic); Republican primary: ▌ ✓ Stan Gunter (Republican); ▌Dick Mills (Republican)	Republican hold
9	R +65.2	Will Wade	Republican	2020	Yes	▌ ✓ Will Wade (Republican)	Republican hold
10	R +62.1	Victor Anderson	Republican	2020	Yes	▌ ✓ Victor Anderson (Republican); ▌Paulette Williams (Democratic)	Republican hold
11	R +61.8	Rick Jasperse	Republican	2010 (special)	Yes	▌ ✓ Rick Jasperse (Republican); ▌Kayla Hollifield (Democratic)	Republican hold
12	R +60.4	Eddie Lumsden	Republican	2012	Yes	▌ ✓ Eddie Lumsden (Republican); ▌Logan Johnson (Democratic)	Republican hold
13	R +28.9	Katie Dempsey	Republican	2006	Yes	▌ ✓ Katie Dempsey (Republican); ▌Kevin Aronhalt (Democratic)	Republican hold
14	R +60.8	Mitchell Scoggins	Republican	2018	Yes	▌ ✓ Mitchell Scoggins (Republican)	Republican hold
15	R +42.2	Matthew Gambill	Republican	2018	Yes	▌ ✓ Matthew Gambill (Republican)	Republican hold
16	R +54.8	Trey Kelley	Republican	2012	Yes	▌ ✓ Trey Kelley (Republican)	Republican hold
17	R +28.2	Martin Momtahan	Republican	2018	Yes	▌ ✓ Martin Momtahan (Republican)	Republican hold
18	R +67.5	Tyler Smith	Republican	2020	Yes	▌ ✓ Tyler Smith (Republican)	Republican hold
19	R +16.8	Joseph Gullett	Republican	2018	Yes	▌ ✓ Joseph Gullett (Republican); ▌RJ Coyle (Democratic)	Republican hold
20	R +32.4	Charlice Byrd	Republican	2005; 2020	Yes	▌ ✓ Charlice Byrd (Republican)	Republican hold
21	R +43.8	Brad Thomas	Republican	2020	Yes	▌ ✓ Brad Thomas (Republican); ▌Mitchell Simmons (Democratic); Republican primary: ▌ ✓ Brad Thomas (Republican); ▌Gregg Kirkpatrick (Republican)	Republican hold
22	R +16.4	Jordan Ridley	Republican	2022	Yes	▌ ✓ Jordan Ridley (Republican); ▌James Shade (Democratic); Republican primary: ▌ ✓ Jordan Ridley (Republican); ▌Paul Kettering (Republican)	Republican hold
23	R +48.0	Mandi Ballinger	Republican	2012	Yes	▌ ✓ Mandi Ballinger (Republican)	Republican hold
24	R +25.1	Carter Barrett	Republican	2022	Yes	▌ ✓ Carter Barrett (Republican); ▌Randye Dugan (Democratic)	Republican hold
25	R +11.7	Todd Jones	Republican	2016	Yes	▌ ✓ Todd Jones (Republican); ▌Elaine Padgett (Democratic); Republican primary: ▌ ✓ Todd Jones (Republican); ▌Cary Lucas (Republican)	Republican hold
26	R +34.7	Lauren McDonald	Republican	2020	Yes	▌ ✓ Lauren McDonald (Republican); ▌Lakiea Bailey (Democratic)	Republican hold
27	R +61.4	Lee Hawkins	Republican	2012	Yes	▌ ✓ Lee Hawkins (Republican)	Republican hold
28	R +52.0	Brent Cox	Republican	2022	Yes	▌ ✓ Brent Cox (Republican); ▌Michael Henson (Democratic)	Republican hold
29	R +15.0	Matt Dubnik	Republican	2016	Yes	▌ ✓ Matt Dubnik (Republican)	Republican hold
30	R +42.5	Derrick McCollum	Republican	2022	Yes	▌ ✓ Derrick McCollum (Republican); ▌Kim Floria (Democratic); Republican primary: ▌ ✓ Derrick McCollum (Republican); ▌Norine Cantor (Republican)	Republican hold
31	R +51.1	Emory Dunahoo	Republican	2011 (special)	Yes	▌ ✓ Emory Dunahoo (Republican)	Republican hold
32	R +65.2	Chris Erwin	Republican	2018 (special); 2019 (special)	Yes	▌ ✓ Chris Erwin (Republican)	Republican hold
33	R +60.4	Alan Powell	Republican	1990	Yes	▌ ✓ Alan Powell (Republican)	Republican hold
34	R +11.8	Devan Seabaugh	Republican	2021 (special)	Yes	▌ ✓ Devan Seabaugh (Republican); ▌Karl Gallegos (Democratic)	Republican hold
35	D +21.0	Lisa Campbell	Democratic	2022	Yes	▌ ✓ Lisa Campbell (Democratic); ▌Gary Chaffee (Republican)	Democratic hold
36	R +20.5	Ginny Ehrhart	Republican	2018	Yes	▌ ✓ Ginny Ehrhart (Republican)	Republican hold
37	D +19.5	Mary Frances Williams	Democratic	2018	Yes	▌ ✓ Mary Frances Williams (Democratic); ▌Shea Taylor (Republican)	Democratic hold
38	D +44.4	David Wilkerson	Democratic	2010	Yes	▌ ✓ David Wilkerson (Democratic); Democratic primary: ▌ ✓ David Wilkerson (Democratic); ▌Martine Claude Maignan (Democratic)	Democratic hold
39	D +56.8	Terry Cummings	Democratic	2022	Yes	▌ ✓ Terry Cummings (Democratic)	Democratic hold
40	R +22.9	Kimberly New (Note: Redistricted from the 64th district.)	Republican	2022	Yes	▌ ✓ Kimberly New (Republican); ▌Montenia Edwards (Democratic); Democratic primary: ▌ ✓ Montenia Edwards (Democratic); ▌Abby Amore (Democratic)	Republican hold
41	D +41.6	Michael Smith	Democratic	2012	Yes	▌ ✓ Michael Smith (Democratic); ▌Andrea Smith (Republican)	Democratic hold
42	D +37.2	Teri Anulewicz	Democratic	2017 (special)	Yes	▌ ✓ Gabriel Sanchez (Democratic); ▌Diane Jackson (Republican); Democratic primary: ▌ Teri Anulewicz (Democratic); ▌ ✓ Gabriel Sanchez (Democratic)	Democratic hold
42	D +37.2	Doug Stoner (Note: Redistricted from the 40th district.)	Democratic	2022; 2022	No	▌ ✓ Gabriel Sanchez (Democratic); ▌Diane Jackson (Republican); Democratic primary: ▌ Teri Anulewicz (Democratic); ▌ ✓ Gabriel Sanchez (Democratic)	Democratic hold
43	D +26.9	Solomon Adesanya	Democratic	2022	Yes	▌ ✓ Solomon Adesanya (Democratic)	Democratic hold
44	R +7.9	Don Parsons	Republican	1994	Yes	▌ ✓ Don Parsons (Republican); ▌Danielle Bell (Democratic)	Republican hold
45	R +4.1	Sharon Cooper	Republican	1996	Yes	▌ ✓ Sharon Cooper (Republican); ▌Eric Castater (Democratic)	Republican hold
46	R +9.9	John Carson	Republican	2011 (special)	Yes	▌ ✓ John Carson (Republican); ▌Micheal Garza (Democratic)	Republican hold
47	R +11.1	Jan Jones	Republican	2002	Yes	▌ ✓ Jan Jones (Republican); ▌Debra Shigley (Democratic); Republican primary: ▌ ✓ Jan Jones (Republican); ▌Phoebe Eckhardt (Republican); Democratic primary: ▌ ✓ Debra Shigley (Democratic); ▌Anthia Carter (Democratic)	Republican hold
48	D +2.9	Scott Hilton	Republican	2022	Yes	▌ ✓ Scott Hilton (Republican); ▌Laura Murvartian (Democratic)	Republican hold
49	R +3.9	Chuck Martin	Republican	2002	Yes	▌ ✓ Chuck Martin (Republican); ▌Grace Demit (Democratic); Republican primary: ▌ ✓ Chuck Martin (Republican); ▌Michael Gordon (Republican); Democratic primary: ▌ ✓ Grace Demit (Democratic); ▌Charles Squires (Democratic)	Republican hold
50	D +18.6	Michelle Au	Democratic	2022	Yes	▌ ✓ Michelle Au (Democratic); ▌Narender Reddy (Republican)	Democratic hold
51	D +21.3	Esther Panitch	Democratic	2022	Yes	▌ ✓ Esther Panitch (Democratic); ▌Derek Gettmann (Republican)	Democratic hold
52	D +26.8	Shea Roberts	Democratic	2020	Yes	▌ ✓ Shea Roberts (Democratic); ▌Robert McNeily (Republican)	Democratic hold
53	D +9.4	Deborah Silcox	Republican	2022	Yes	▌ ✓ Deborah Silcox (Republican); ▌Susie Greenberg (Democratic)	Republican hold
54	D +21.8	Betsy Holland	Democratic	2018	Yes	▌ ✓ Betsy Holland (Democratic); ▌Sam Brown-Parks (Republican)	Democratic hold
55	D +61.2	Inga Willis	Democratic	2022	Yes	▌ ✓ Inga Willis (Democratic); ▌Samuel Lenaeus (Republican)	Democratic hold
56	D +81.1	Mesha Mainor	Republican	2020	Yes	▌ ✓ Bryce Berry (Democratic); ▌Mesha Mainor (Republican); Democratic primary: ▌ ✓ Bryce Berry (Democratic); ▌Ada Merello (Democratic); ▌Corwin Monson (Democratic); ▌Dawn Samad (Democratic); ▌Leonard Watkins (Democratic)	Democratic gain
57	D +61.2	Stacey Evans	Democratic	2010; 2020	Yes	▌ ✓ Stacey Evans (Democratic); ▌Julie Allen (Republican)	Democratic hold
58	D +81.0	Park Cannon	Democratic	2016 (special)	Yes	▌ ✓ Park Cannon (Democratic)	Democratic hold
59	D +85.7	Phil Olaleye	Democratic	2022	Yes	▌ ✓ Phil Olaleye (Democratic); ▌Maurice Mpayamaguru (Republican)	Democratic hold
60	D +48.7	Sheila Jones	Democratic	2004	Yes	▌ ✓ Sheila Jones (Democratic); ▌Cathy G. Henson (Republican); Democratic primary: ▌ ✓ Sheila Jones (Democratic); ▌Diane Clair (Democratic)	Democratic hold
61	D +57.2	Roger Bruce	Democratic	2002	No	▌ ✓ Mekyah McQueen (Democratic); Democratic primary: ▌De'Lonn Brown (Democratic); ▌ ✓ Mekyah McQueen (Democratic)	Democratic hold
62	D +84.2	Tanya F. Miller	Democratic	2022	Yes	▌ ✓ Tanya F. Miller (Democratic)	Democratic hold
63	D +80.7	Kim Schofield	Democratic	2017 (special)	Yes	▌ ✓ Kim Schofield (Democratic)	Democratic hold
64	D +31.4	New seat				▌ ✓ Sylvia Wayfer Baker (Democratic); ▌Cassaundra Burks (Republican)	Democratic hold
65	D +51.8	Mandisha Thomas	Democratic	2020	No	▌ ✓ Robert Dawson (Democratic); Democratic primary: ▌ ✓ Robert Dawson (Democratic); ▌Mel Keyton (Democratic); ▌De'Andre Pickett (Democratic); ▌Sam Wakefield (Democratic)	Democratic hold
66	D +40.0	Kimberly Alexander	Democratic	2012	Yes	▌ ✓ Kimberly Alexander (Democratic)	Democratic hold
67	D +32.0	Lydia Glaize	Democratic	2022	Yes	▌ ✓ Lydia Glaize (Democratic); ▌Matthew Hammett (Republican); Republican primary: ▌ ✓ Matthew Hammett (Republican); ▌Kevin G. Smith (Republican)	Democratic hold
68	D +30.1	Derrick Jackson	Democratic	2016; 2023 (special)	Yes	▌ ✓ Derrick Jackson (Democratic)	Democratic hold
69	D +47.7	Debra Bazemore	Democratic	2016	Yes	▌ ✓ Debra Bazemore (Democratic); Democratic primary: ▌ ✓ Debra Bazemore (Democratic); ▌Cobie Brown (Democratic); ▌Jared Daigre (Democratic); ▌Bobby Ferrell (Democratic); ▌Ray Mills (Democratic)	Democratic hold
70	R +23.1	Lynn Smith	Republican	1996	Yes	▌ ✓ Lynn Smith (Republican); ▌Diane Boulai (Democratic)	Republican hold
71	R +33.8	J. Collins	Republican	2016	No	▌ ✓ Jutt Howard (Republican); ▌Kwasi Hudson (Democratic); Republican primary: ▌ ✓ Jutt Howard (Republican); ▌Marc Lattanzio (Republican)	Republican hold
72	R +42.2	David Huddleston	Republican	2022	Yes	▌ ✓ David Huddleston (Republican); ▌Rodney Moore (Democratic)	Republican hold
73	R +27.3	Josh Bonner	Republican	2016	Yes	▌ ✓ Josh Bonner (Republican); ▌Tom Thomason(Democratic); Democratic primary: ▌ ✓ Tom Thomason (Democratic); ▌Tim Wilkinson (Democratic)	Republican hold
74	D +50.4	New seat				▌ ✓ Robert Flournoy (Democratic); Democratic primary: ▌ ✓ Robert Flournoy (Democratic); ▌Maggy Martinez (Democratic)	Democratic hold
75	D +72.2	Eric Bell II	Democratic	2023 (special)	Yes	▌ ✓ Eric Bell II (Democratic); Democratic primary: ▌ ✓ Eric Bell II (Democratic); ▌Michael Glanton Jr (Democratic)	Democratic hold
76	D +69.4	Sandra Scott	Democratic	2010	Yes	▌ ✓ Sandra Scott (Democratic)	Democratic hold
77	D +78.1	Rhonda Burnough	Democratic	2016	Yes	▌ ✓ Rhonda Burnough (Democratic)	Democratic hold
78	D +44.1	Demetrius Douglas	Democratic	2012	Yes	▌ ✓ Demetrius Douglas (Democratic)	Democratic hold
79	D +75.4	Yasmin Neal	Democratic	2010; 2020	Yes	▌ ✓ Yasmin Neal (Democratic)	Democratic hold
80	D +22.9	Long Tran	Democratic	2022	Yes	▌ ✓ Long Tran (Democratic); ▌Brian Anderson (Republican)	Democratic hold
81	R +29.3	Lauren Daniel (Note: Redistricted from the 117th district.)	Republican	2022	Yes	▌ ✓ Noelle Kahaian (Republican); ▌Mishael White (Democratic); Republican primary: ▌Lauren Daniel (Republican); ▌ ✓ Noelle Kahaian (Republican)	Republican hold
82	R +26.1	Karen Mathiak (Note: Redistricted from the 74th district.)	Republican	2016	Yes	▌ ✓ Karen Mathiak (Republican); ▌Anthony Dickson (Democratic)	Republican hold
83	D +31.4	Karen Lupton	Democratic	2022	Yes	▌ ✓ Karen Lupton (Democratic); ▌Catherine Bernard (Republican)	Democratic hold
84	D +81.5	Mary Margaret Oliver (Note: Redistricted from the 82nd district.)	Democratic	1987 (special); 2002	Yes	▌ ✓ Mary Margaret Oliver (Democratic); Democratic primary: ▌ ✓ Mary Margaret Oliver (Democratic); ▌Hunter Kemp (Democratic)	Democratic hold
85	D +72.4	Karla Drenner	Democratic	2000	Yes	▌ ✓ Karla Drenner (Democratic)	Democratic hold
86	D +67.7	Imani Barnes	Democratic	2022	Yes	▌ ✓ Imani Barnes (Democratic); ▌Barry "Z" Zisholtz (Republican)	Democratic hold
87	D +58.2	Viola Davis	Democratic	2018	Yes	▌ ✓ Viola Davis (Democratic)	Democratic hold
88	D +64.4	Billy Mitchell	Democratic	2002	Yes	▌ ✓ Billy Mitchell (Democratic); ▌William Park Freeman (Republican)	Democratic hold
89	D +84.1	Omari Crawford (Note: Redistricted from the 84th district.)	Democratic	2022	Yes	▌ ✓ Omari Crawford (Democratic)	Democratic hold
90	D +83.0	Saira Draper	Democratic	2022	Yes	▌ ✓ Saira Draper (Democratic); Democratic primary: ▌ ✓ Saira Draper (Democratic); ▌Becky Evans (Democratic)	Democratic hold
90	D +83.0	Becky Evans (Note: Redistricted from the 89th district.)	Democratic	2018	Yes	▌ ✓ Saira Draper (Democratic); Democratic primary: ▌ ✓ Saira Draper (Democratic); ▌Becky Evans (Democratic)	Democratic hold
91	D +58.7	Angela Moore	Democratic	2021 (special)	Yes	▌ ✓ Angela Moore (Democratic); Democratic primary: ▌ ✓ Angela Moore (Democratic); ▌Marcus Akins (Democratic); ▌Dee Dawkins-Haigler (Democratic)	Democratic hold
92	D +54.9	Rhonda Taylor	Democratic	2020	Yes	▌ ✓ Rhonda Taylor (Democratic)	Democratic hold
93	D +52.5	Doreen Carter	Democratic	2015 (special)	Yes	▌ ✓ Doreen Carter (Democratic)	Democratic hold
94	D +51.3	Karen Bennett	Democratic	2012	Yes	▌ ✓ Karen Bennett (Democratic)	Democratic hold
95	D +63.1	Dar'shun Kendrick	Democratic	2010	Yes	▌ ✓ Dar'shun Kendrick (Democratic)	Democratic hold
96	D +33.2	Pedro Marin	Democratic	2002	No	▌ ✓ Arlene Beckles (Democratic); Democratic primary: ▌ ✓ Arlene Beckles (Democratic); ▌Sonia Lopez (Democratic); ▌Neva Thompson (Democratic)	Democratic hold
97	D +27.6	Ruwa Romman	Democratic	2022	Yes	▌ ✓ Ruwa Romman (Democratic); ▌Michael Allen Corbin (Republican)	Democratic hold
98	D +48.8	Marvin Lim	Democratic	2020	Yes	▌ ✓ Marvin Lim (Democratic); Democratic primary: ▌ ✓ Marvin Lim (Democratic); ▌Jorge Luis Granados (Democratic)	Democratic hold
99	D +5.5	Matt Reeves	Republican	2022	Yes	▌ ✓ Matt Reeves (Republican); ▌Michelle Kang (Democratic)	Republican hold
100	R +19.9	David Clark	Republican	2014	Yes	▌ ✓ David Clark (Republican); ▌Jennifer Ambler (Democratic); Republican primary: ▌ ✓ David Clark (Republican); ▌Michael Day (Republican)	Republican hold
101	D +47.1	Scott Holcomb (Note: Redistricted from the 81st district.)	Democratic	2010	Yes	▌ ✓ Scott Holcomb (Democratic); ▌Kendra Biegalski (Republican)	Democratic hold
102	D +33.7	Gabe Okoye	Democratic	2022	Yes	▌ ✓ Gabe Okoye (Democratic); ▌J. Scott Vandiver (Republican)	Democratic hold
103	R +13.2	Soo Hong	Republican	2022	Yes	▌ ✓ Soo Hong (Republican); ▌Chris Luchey (Democratic)	Republican hold
104	R +27.2	Chuck Efstration	Republican	2013 (special)	Yes	▌ ✓ Chuck Efstration (Republican)	Republican hold
105	D +0.3	Farooq Mughal	Democratic	2022	Yes	▌ ✓ Sandy Donatucci (Republican); ▌Farooq Mughal (Democratic)	Republican gain
106	D +24.6	Shelly Hutchinson	Democratic	2018	Yes	▌ ✓ Shelly Hutchinson (Democratic)	Democratic hold
107	D +22.8	Sam Park	Democratic	2016	Yes	▌ ✓ Sam Park (Democratic); ▌Hai Cao (Republican)	Democratic hold
107	D +22.8	Gregg Kennard (Note: Redistricted from the 101st district.)	Democratic	2018	No	▌ ✓ Sam Park (Democratic); ▌Hai Cao (Republican)	Democratic hold
108	D +7.6	Jasmine Clark	Democratic	2018	Yes	▌ ✓ Jasmine Clark (Democratic); ▌Elvia Davila (Republican)	Democratic hold
109	D +53.0	Dewey McClain	Democratic	2013 (special)	Yes	▌ ✓ Dewey McClain (Democratic)	Democratic hold
110	D +23.2	Segun Adeyina	Democratic	2022	Yes	▌ ✓ Segun Adeyina (Democratic); ▌Charles Lollar (Republican)	Democratic hold
111	R +27.2	Reynaldo Martinez	Republican	2022	Yes	▌ ✓ Reynaldo Martinez (Republican); ▌Scott Jackson (Democratic)	Republican hold
112	R +37.8	Bruce Williamson	Republican	2010	Yes	▌ ✓ Bruce Williamson (Republican)	Republican hold
113	D +42.9	Sharon Henderson	Democratic	2020	Yes	▌ ✓ Sharon Henderson (Democratic); Democratic primary: ▌ ✓ Sharon Henderson (Democratic); ▌Karla Daniels Hooper (Democratic)	Democratic hold
114	R +39.2	Tim Fleming	Republican	2022	Yes	▌ ✓ Tim Fleming (Republican)	Republican hold
115	D +63.8	Regina Lewis-Ward	Democratic	2020	Yes	▌ ✓ Regina Lewis-Ward (Democratic)	Democratic hold
116	D +63.3	El-Mahdi Holly	Democratic	2018	Yes	▌ ✓ El-Mahdi Holly (Democratic); ▌Reign Stevens (Republican)	Democratic hold
117	D +44.3	New seat				▌ ✓ Mary Ann Santos (Democratic)	Democratic hold
118	R +32.2	Clint Crowe	Republican	2020	Yes	▌ ✓ Clint Crowe (Republican); ▌Sharonda Bell (Democratic)	Republican hold
119	R +44.8	Holt Persinger	Republican	2023 (special)	Yes	▌ ✓ Holt Persinger (Republican)	Republican hold
120	R +10.0	Houston Gaines	Republican	2018	Yes	▌ ✓ Houston Gaines (Republican); ▌Andrew Ferguson (Democratic)	Republican hold
121	R +7.9	Marcus Wiedower	Republican	2018	Yes	▌ ✓ Marcus Wiedower (Republican); ▌Eric Gisler (Democratic); Republican primary: ▌ ✓ Marcus Wiedower (Republican); ▌John Michael Grigsby (Republican)	Republican hold
122	D +56.6	Spencer Frye	Democratic	2012	Yes	▌ ✓ Spencer Frye (Democratic)	Democratic hold
123	R +35.8	Rob Leverett	Republican	2020	Yes	▌ ✓ Rob Leverett (Republican); ▌Hope S Beard (Democratic)	Republican hold
124	R +20.2	Trey Rhodes	Republican	2015 (special)	Yes	▌ ✓ Trey Rhodes (Republican); ▌Melanie Miller (Democratic)	Republican hold
125	R +24.6	Gary Richardson	Republican	2024 (special)	Yes	▌ ✓ Gary Richardson (Republican); ▌Kay Turner (Democratic); Republican primary: ▌CJ Pearson (Republican); ▌ ✓ Gary Richardson (Republican)	Republican hold
126	D +23.7	Gloria Frazier	Democratic	2006	No	▌ ✓ L.C. Myles (Democratic); ▌William C. Harris (Republican)	Democratic hold
127	R +24.6	Mark Newton	Republican	2016	Yes	▌ ✓ Mark Newton (Republican)	Republican hold
128	D +0.5	Mack Jackson	Democratic	2008	Yes	▌ ✓ Mack Jackson (Democratic); ▌Tracy Wheeler (Republican)	Democratic hold
129	D +36.6	Karlton Howard	Democratic	2023 (special)	Yes	▌ ✓ Karlton Howard (Democratic); Democratic primary: ▌Karlton Howard (Democratic); ▌Scott Cambers (Democratic)	Democratic hold
130	D +36.3	Lynn Gladney	Democratic	2022	Yes	▌ ✓ Lynn Gladney (Democratic)	Democratic hold
131	R +26.2	Jodi Lott	Republican	2015 (special)	No	▌ ✓ Rob Clifton (Republican); ▌Heather White (Democratic); Republican primary: ▌Paul Abbott (Republican); ▌David Byrne (Republican); ▌Benjamin Cairns (Republican); ▌ ✓ Rob Clifton (Republican); ▌Russell Wilder (Republican)	Republican hold
132	D +40.0	Brian Prince	Democratic	2013 (special)	Yes	▌ ✓ Brian Prince (Democratic)	Democratic hold
133	R +32.8	Danny Mathis (Note: Redistricted from the 149th district.)	Republican	2016	Yes	▌ ✓ Danny Mathis (Republican)	Republican hold
134	R +34.1	Robert Dickey (Note: Redistricted from the 145th district.)	Republican	2011 (special)	Yes	▌ ✓ Robert Dickey (Republican); Republican primary: ▌ ✓ Robert Dickey (Republican); ▌Joshua Lewis (Republican)	Republican hold
135	R +47.3	Beth Camp	Republican	2020	Yes	▌ ✓ Beth Camp (Republican)	Republican hold
135	R +47.3	David Knight (Note: Redistricted from the 134th district.)	Republican	2004	No	▌ ✓ Beth Camp (Republican)	Republican hold
136	R +29.7	David Jenkins	Republican	2020	Yes	▌ ✓ David Jenkins (Republican); ▌Jeff Lowe (Democratic); Republican primary: ▌ ✓ David Jenkins (Republican); ▌Michael J. Riesen (Republican)	Republican hold
137	D +17.8	Debbie Buckner	Democratic	2002	Yes	▌ ✓ Debbie Buckner (Democratic); ▌Stephen Acorn (Republican); Democratic primary: ▌ ✓ Debbie Buckner (Democratic); ▌Carlton Mahone Sr (Democratic)	Democratic hold
138	R +39.8	Vance Smith	Republican	1992; 2018	Yes	▌ ✓ Vance Smith (Republican)	Republican hold
139	R +21.4	Carmen Rice	Republican	2024 (Special)	Yes	▌ ✓ Carmen Rice (Republican); ▌Carl Sprayberry (Democratic); Republican primary: ▌Sean Knox (Republican); ▌Donald R. Moeller (Republican); ▌ ✓ Carmen Rice (Republican)	Republican hold
140	D +48.8	Tremaine Teddy Reese	Democratic	2022	Yes	▌ ✓ Tremaine Teddy Reese (Democratic); Democratic primary: ▌ ✓ Tremaine Teddy Reese (Democratic); ▌Alyssa Nia Williams (Democratic)	Democratic hold
141	D +47.0	Carolyn Hugley	Democratic	1992	Yes	▌ ✓ Carolyn Hugley (Democratic)	Democratic hold
142	D +19.0	Miriam Paris	Democratic	2016	Yes	▌ ✓ Miriam Paris (Democratic); ▌Calvin Dennis Palmer (Republican)	Democratic hold
143	D +22.9	James Beverly	Democratic	2011 (special)	No	▌ ✓ Anissa Jones (Democratic); ▌Barbara Boyer (Republican)	Democratic hold
144	R +41.0	Dale Washburn	Republican	2018	Yes	▌ ✓ Dale Washburn (Republican); ▌Anita Hyland (Democratic)	Republican hold
145	D +8.7	New seat				▌ ✓ Tangie Herring (Democratic); ▌Noah Redding Harbuck (Republican); Democratic primary: ▌Donald L. Druitt Sr (Democratic); ▌ ✓ Tangie Herring (Democratic); ▌Juawn Jackson (Democratic); Republican primary: ▌ ✓ Noah Redding Harbuck (Republican); ▌Nancy Hicks (Republican); ▌De'Ron Rogers (Republican)	Democratic gain
146	R +22.9	Shaw Blackmon	Republican	2015 (special)	Yes	▌ ✓ Shaw Blackmon (Republican)	Republican hold
147	R +10.6	Bethany Ballard	Republican	2022	Yes	▌ ✓ Bethany Ballard (Republican); ▌Ariel Phillips (Democratic)	Republican hold
148	R +34.2	Noel Williams Jr.	Republican	2018	Yes	▌ ✓ Noel Williams Jr. (Republican)	Republican hold
149	D +19.7	Kenneth Vance (Note: Redistricted from the 133rd district.)	Republican	2022	Yes	▌Kenneth Vance (Republican); ▌ ✓ Floyd Griffin (Democratic); Democratic primary: ▌ ✓ Floyd Griffin (Democratic); ▌Phyllis Tufts Hightower (Democratic)	Democratic gain
150	D +9.0	Patty Marie Stinson	Democratic	2012	Yes	▌ ✓ Patty Marie Stinson (Democratic); ▌Cary Moore (Republican)	Democratic hold
151	R +3.8	Mike Cheokas	Republican	2004; 2018	Yes	▌ ✓ Mike Cheokas (Republican)	Republican hold
152	R +39.3	Bill Yearta	Republican	2019 (special)	Yes	▌ ✓ Bill Yearta (Republican)	Republican hold
153	D +36.2	David Sampson	Democratic	2022	Yes	▌ ✓ David Sampson (Democratic); ▌Brenda Battle (Republican); Democratic primary: ▌ ✓ David Sampson (Democratic); ▌Joshua Anthony (Democratic); ▌Tracy Taylor (Democratic)	Democratic hold
154	D +7.5	Gerald Greene	Republican	1982	Yes	▌ ✓ Gerald Greene (Republican)	Republican hold
155	R +30.0	Matt Hatchett	Republican	2010	Yes	▌ ✓ Matt Hatchett (Republican)	Republican hold
156	R +40.1	Leesa Hagan	Republican	2021 (special)	Yes	▌ ✓ Leesa Hagan (Republican)	Republican hold
157	R +49.4	Bill Werkheiser	Republican	2014	Yes	▌ ✓ Bill Werkheiser (Republican)	Republican hold
158	R +29.9	Butch Parrish	Republican	1984	Yes	▌ ✓ Butch Parrish (Republican); ▌Madeline Ryan Smith (Democratic)	Republican hold
159	R +38.6	Jon G. Burns	Republican	2004	Yes	▌ ✓ Jon G. Burns (Republican)	Republican hold
160	R +35.8	Lehman Franklin	Republican	2022	Yes	▌ ✓ Lehman Franklin (Republican)	Republican hold
161	R +18.3	Bill Hitchens	Republican	2012	Yes	▌ ✓ Bill Hitchens (Republican)	Republican hold
162	D +33.9	Carl Gilliard	Democratic	2016 (special)	Yes	▌ ✓ Carl Gilliard (Democratic); ▌Keith Padgett(Republican); Republican primary: ▌ ✓ Keith Padgett (Republican); ▌Tami Williams (Republican)	Democratic hold
163	D +44.7	Anne Allen Westbrook	Democratic	2022	Yes	▌ ✓ Anne Allen Westbrook (Democratic)	Democratic hold
164	R +14.0	Ron Stephens	Republican	1997 (special)	Yes	▌ ✓ Ron Stephens (Republican)	Republican hold
165	D +55.3	Edna Jackson	Democratic	2021 (special)	Yes	▌ ✓ Edna Jackson (Democratic)	Democratic hold
166	R +30.2	Jesse Petrea	Republican	2014	Yes	▌ ✓ Jesse Petrea (Republican); ▌Gay Fortson (Democratic)	Republican hold
167	R +34.2	Buddy DeLoach	Republican	1994; 2020	Yes	▌ ✓ Buddy DeLoach (Republican); ▌Rebekah Moore (Democratic)	Republican hold
168	D +24.1	Al Williams	Democratic	2002	Yes	▌ ✓ Al Williams (Democratic); Democratic primary: ▌ ✓ Al Williams (Democratic); ▌Henry L Covington (Democratic)	Democratic hold
169	R +44.3	Clay Pirkle	Republican	2015 (special)	No	▌ ✓ Angie O'Steen (Republican); ▌Theresa Rewis (Democratic); Republican primary: ▌ ✓ Angie O'Steen (Republican); ▌William E. Roberts (Republican)	Republican hold
170	R +42.7	Penny Houston	Republican	1997 (special)	No	▌ ✓ Jaclyn Dixon Ford (Republican); Republican primary: ▌ ✓ Jaclyn Dixon (Republican); ▌Donny Roberson (Republican)	Republican hold
171	R +20.7	Joe Campbell	Republican	2020 (special)	Yes	▌ ✓ Joe Campbell (Republican); Republican primary: ▌ ✓ Joe Campbell (Republican); ▌Crosby Steen (Republican)	Republican hold
172	R +45.0	Charles Cannon	Republican	2023 (special)	Yes	▌ ✓ Charles Cannon (Republican)	Republican hold
173	R +16.0	Darlene Taylor	Republican	2010	Yes	▌ ✓ Darlene Taylor (Republican); ▌Theresa Thomas (Democratic)	Republican hold
174	R +58.1	John Corbett	Republican	2014	Yes	▌ ✓ John Corbett (Republican)	Republican hold
175	R +28.4	John LaHood	Republican	2018 (special)	Yes	▌ ✓ John LaHood (Republican); ▌Anissa Knight Wiseman (Democratic)	Republican hold
176	R +42.2	James Burchett	Republican	2019 (special)	Yes	▌ ✓ James Burchett (Republican)	Republican hold
177	D +14.2	Dexter Sharper	Democratic	2012	Yes	▌ ✓ Dexter Sharper (Democratic); ▌Clay Griner (Republican)	Democratic hold
178	R +67.9	Steven Meeks	Republican	2018	Yes	▌ ✓ Steven Meeks (Republican)	Republican hold
179	R +15.7	Rick Townsend	Republican	2022	Yes	▌ ✓ Rick Townsend (Republican)	Republican hold
180	R +30.9	Steven Sainz	Republican	2018	Yes	▌ ✓ Steven Sainz (Republican); ▌Defonsio Daniels (Democratic); Republican primary: ▌ ✓ Steven Sainz (Republican); ▌Glenn Cook (Republican); ▌David L. Rainer (Republican)	Republican hold

=== Seat changes ===
2024 Georgia House of Representatives election results
Party	Races contested	Seats	Aggregate votes		2022 general		Change	
Party	Races contested	Seats	No.	Percent	Seats	%	Seats	%
Republican	141	100	2,616,271	54.64%	102	55.25%	+2	-0.61%
Democratic	132	80	2,172,046	45.36%	78	44.75%	−2	+0.61%
Totals	273	180	4,788,317	100%	—	100	100	—

=== Closest races ===
Seats where the margin of victory was under 10%:

1. District 105, 0.2% (gain)
2. District 128, 0.2%
3. District 145, 1% (gain)
4. District 99, 2.2%
5. District 53, 3.8%
6. District 150, 6.4%
7. District 108, 7.8%
8. District 149, 9% (gain)
9. District 48, 9.8%

== Detailed results ==
Source for primary election results: Source for general election results:

=== District 1 ===
2nd term incumbent Republican Mike Cameron had represented the district since 2021.

1st district Republican primary
Party	Candidate	Votes	%
Republican	Mike Cameron (incumbent)	6,541	100%
Total votes		6,541	100%

1st district Democratic primary
Party	Candidate	Votes	%
Democratic	Jack Zibluk	775	100%
Total votes		775	100%

1st district general election
Party	Candidate	Votes	%
Republican	Mike Cameron (incumbent)	21,227	80.3%
Democratic	Jack Zibluk	5,195	19.7%
Total votes		27,142	100%
Republican hold			

=== District 2 ===
6th term incumbent Republican Steve Tarvin had represented the district since 2014.

2nd district Republican primary
Party	Candidate	Votes	%
Republican	Steve Tarvin (incumbent)	7,362	100%
Total votes		7,362	100%

2nd district general election
Party	Candidate	Votes	%
Republican	Steve Tarvin (incumbent)	27,194	100%
Total votes		27,194	100%
Republican hold			

=== District 3 ===
1st term incumbent Republican Mitchell Horner had represented the district since 2023.

3rd district Republican primary
Party	Candidate	Votes	%
Republican	Mitchell Horner (incumbent)	4,789	100%
Total votes		4,789	100%

3rd district general election
Party	Candidate	Votes	%
Republican	Mitchell Horner (incumbent)	25,884	100%
Total votes		25,884	100%
Republican hold			

=== District 4 ===
4th term incumbent Republican Kasey Carpenter had represented the district since 2017.

4th district Republican primary
Party	Candidate	Votes	%
Republican	Kasey Carpenter (incumbent)	2,679	100%
Total votes		2,679	100%

4th district general election
Party	Candidate	Votes	%
Republican	Kasey Carpenter (incumbent)	14,785	100%
Total votes		14,785	100%
Republican hold			

=== District 5 ===
3rd term incumbent Republican Matt Barton had represented the district since 2019.

5th district Republican primary
Party	Candidate	Votes	%
Republican	Matt Barton (incumbent)	5,981	100%
Total votes		5,981	100%

5th district general election
Party	Candidate	Votes	%
Republican	Matt Barton (incumbent)	24,874	100%
Total votes		24,874	100%
Republican hold			

=== District 6 ===
4th term incumbent Republican Jason Ridley had represented the district since 2017.

6th district Republican primary
Party	Candidate	Votes	%
Republican	Jason Ridley (incumbent)	6,160	100%
Total votes		6,160	100%

6th district Democratic primary
Party	Candidate	Votes	%
Democratic	Cathy Kott	340	100%
Total votes		340	100%

6th district general election
Party	Candidate	Votes	%
Republican	Jason Ridley (incumbent)	22,597	85.3%
Democratic	Cathy Kott	3,894	14.7%
Total votes		26,491	100%
Republican hold			

=== District 7 ===
1st term incumbent Republican Johnny Chastain had represented the district since 2023.

7th district Republican primary
Party	Candidate	Votes	%
Republican	Johnny Chastain (incumbent)	8,956	100%
Total votes		8,956	100%

7th district general election
Party	Candidate	Votes	%
Republican	Johnny Chastain (incumbent)	32,125	100%
Total votes		32,125	100%
Republican hold			

=== District 8 ===
2nd term incumbent Republican Stan Gunter had represented the district since 2021.

8th district Republican primary
Party	Candidate	Votes	%
Republican	Stan Gunter (incumbent)	9,933	73.8%
Republican	Dick Mills	3,532	26.2%
Total votes		13,465	100%

8th district Democratic primary
Party	Candidate	Votes	%
Democratic	Charlotte Sleczkowski	853	100%
Total votes		853	100%

8th district general election
Party	Candidate	Votes	%
Republican	Stan Gunter (incumbent)	33,249	84.8%
Democratic	Charlotte Sleczkowski	5,948	15.2%
Total votes		39,197	100%
Republican hold			

=== District 9 ===
6th term incumbent Republican Will Wade had represented the district since 2013.

9th district Republican primary
Party	Candidate	Votes	%
Republican	Will Wade (incumbent)	6,674	100%
Total votes		6,674	100%

9th district general election
Party	Candidate	Votes	%
Republican	Will Wade (incumbent)	32,101	100%
Total votes		32,101	100%
Republican hold			

=== District 10 ===
2nd term incumbent Republican Victor Anderson had represented the district since 2021.

10th district Republican primary
Party	Candidate	Votes	%
Republican	Victor Anderson (incumbent)	8,276	100%
Total votes		8,276	100%

10th district Democratic primary
Party	Candidate	Votes	%
Democratic	Paulette Williams	664	100%
Total votes		664	100%

10th district general election
Party	Candidate	Votes	%
Republican	Victor Anderson (incumbent)	25,871	82.9%
Democratic	Paulette Williams	5,323	17.1%
Total votes		31,194	100%
Republican hold			

=== District 11 ===
8th term incumbent Republican Rick Jasperse had represented the district since 2010.

11th district Republican primary
Party	Candidate	Votes	%
Republican	Rick Jasperse (incumbent)	4,353	100%
Total votes		4,353	100%

11th district Democratic primary
Party	Candidate	Votes	%
Democratic	Kayla Hollifield	696	100%
Total votes		696	100%

11th district general election
Party	Candidate	Votes	%
Republican	Rick Jasperse (incumbent)	30,728	82.8%
Democratic	Kayla Hollifield	6,392	17.2%
Total votes		37,120	100%
Republican hold			

=== District 12 ===
6th term incumbent Republican Eddie Lumsden had represented the district since 2013.

12th district Republican primary
Party	Candidate	Votes	%
Republican	Eddie Lumsden (incumbent)	5,475	100%
Total votes		5,475	100%

12th district Democratic primary
Party	Candidate	Votes	%
Democratic	Logan Johnson	689	100%
Total votes		689	100%

12th district general election
Party	Candidate	Votes	%
Republican	Eddie Lumsden (incumbent)	21,310	81.7%
Democratic	Logan Johnson	4,778	18.3%
Total votes		26,088	100%
Republican hold			

=== District 13 ===
9th term incumbent Republican Katie Dempsey had represented the district since 2007.

13th district Republican primary
Party	Candidate	Votes	%
Republican	Katie Dempsey (incumbent)	3,303	100%
Total votes		3,303	100%

13th district Democratic primary
Party	Candidate	Votes	%
Democratic	Kevin Aronhalt	989	100%
Total votes		989	100%

13th district general election
Party	Candidate	Votes	%
Republican	Katie Dempsey (incumbent)	17,407	69.7%
Democratic	Kevin Aronhalt	7,555	30.3%
Total votes		24,962	100%
Republican hold			

=== District 14 ===
3rd term incumbent Republican Mitchell Scoggins had represented the district since 2019.

14th district Republican primary
Party	Candidate	Votes	%
Republican	Mitchell Scoggins (incumbent)	4,990	100%
Total votes		4,990	100%

14th district general election
Party	Candidate	Votes	%
Republican	Mitchell Scoggins (incumbent)	30,460	100%
Total votes		30,460	100%
Republican hold			

=== District 15 ===
3rd term incumbent Republican Matthew Gambill had represented the district since 2019.

15th district Republican primary
Party	Candidate	Votes	%
Republican	Matthew Gambill (incumbent)	3,601	100%
Total votes		3,601	100%

15th district general election
Party	Candidate	Votes	%
Republican	Matthew Gambill (incumbent)	25,032	100%
Total votes		25,032	100%
Republican hold			

=== District 16 ===
6th term incumbent Republican Trey Kelley had represented the district since 2013.

16th district Republican primary
Party	Candidate	Votes	%
Republican	Trey Kelley (incumbent)	5,049	100%
Total votes		5,049	100%

16th district general election
Party	Candidate	Votes	%
Republican	Trey Kelley (incumbent)	25,296	100%
Total votes		25,296	100%
Republican hold			

=== District 17 ===
3rd term incumbent Republican Martin Momtahan had represented the district since 2019.

17th district Republican primary
Party	Candidate	Votes	%
Republican	Martin Momtahan (incumbent)	4,758	100%
Total votes		4,758	100%

17th district general election
Party	Candidate	Votes	%
Republican	Martin Momtahan (incumbent)	25,364	100%
Total votes		25,364	100%
Republican hold			

=== District 18 ===
2nd term incumbent Republican Tyler Smith had represented the district since 2021.

18th district Republican primary
Party	Candidate	Votes	%
Republican	Tyler Smith (incumbent)	8,676	100%
Total votes		8,676	100%

18th district general election
Party	Candidate	Votes	%
Republican	Tyler Smith (incumbent)	30,101	100%
Total votes		30,101	100%
Republican hold			

=== District 19 ===
3rd term incumbent Republican Joseph Gullett had represented the district since 2019.

19th district Republican primary
Party	Candidate	Votes	%
Republican	Joseph Gullett (incumbent)	4,146	100%
Total votes		4,146	100%

19th district Democratic primary
Party	Candidate	Votes	%
Democratic	R.J. Coyle	2,425	100%
Total votes		2,425	100%

19th district general election
Party	Candidate	Votes	%
Republican	Joseph Gullett (incumbent)	19,659	57.3%
Democratic	RJ Coyle	16,642	42.7%
Total votes		34,301	100%
Republican hold			

=== District 20 ===
6th term incumbent Republican Charlice Byrd had represented the district since 2013.

20th district Republican primary
Party	Candidate	Votes	%
Republican	Charlice Byrd (incumbent)	4,101	100%
Total votes		4,101	100%

20th district general election
Party	Candidate	Votes	%
Republican	Charlice Byrd (incumbent)	28,540	100%
Total votes		28,540	100%
Republican hold			

=== District 21 ===
6th term incumbent Republican Brad Thomas had represented the district since 2013.

21st district Republican primary
Party	Candidate	Votes	%
Republican	Brad Thomas (incumbent)	5,093	80.9%
Republican	Greg Kirkpatrick	1,206	19.1%
Total votes		6,299	100%

21st district Democratic primary
Party	Candidate	Votes	%
Democratic	Mitchell Simmons	1,394	100%
Total votes		1,394	100%

21st district general election
Party	Candidate	Votes	%
Republican	Brad Thomas (incumbent)	28,977	75.0%
Democratic	Mitchell Simmons	9,668	25.0%
Total votes		38,645	100%
Republican hold			

=== District 22 ===
1st term incumbent Republican Jordan Ridley had represented the district since 2023.

22nd district Republican primary
Party	Candidate	Votes	%
Republican	Jordan Ridley (incumbent)	2,603	66.0%
Republican	Paul Kettering	1,342	34.0%
Total votes		3,945	100%

22nd district Democratic primary
Party	Candidate	Votes	%
Democratic	JL Shade	1,813	100%
Total votes		1,813	100%

22nd district general election
Party	Candidate	Votes	%
Republican	Jordan Ridley (incumbent)	19,402	60.5%
Democratic	JL Shade	12,642	39.5%
Total votes		32,044	100%
Republican hold			

=== District 23 ===
6th term incumbent Republican Mandi Ballinger had represented the district since 2013.

23rd district Republican primary
Party	Candidate	Votes	%
Republican	Mandi Ballinger (incumbent)	4,890	100%
Total votes		4,890	100%

23rd district general election
Party	Candidate	Votes	%
Republican	Mandi Ballinger (incumbent)	29,402	100%
Total votes		29,402	100%
Republican hold			

=== District 24 ===
1st term incumbent Republican Carter Barrett had represented the district since 2023.

24th district Republican primary
Party	Candidate	Votes	%
Republican	Carter Barrett (incumbent)	2,745	100%
Total votes		2,745	100%

24th district Democratic primary
Party	Candidate	Votes	%
Democratic	Randye Dugan	1,046	100%
Total votes		1,046	100%

24th district general election
Party	Candidate	Votes	%
Republican	Carter Barrett (incumbent)	20,845	67.5%
Democratic	Randye Dugan	10,044	32.5%
Total votes		30,889	100%
Republican hold			

=== District 25 ===
4th term incumbent Republican Todd Jones had represented the district since 2017.

25th district Republican primary
Party	Candidate	Votes	%
Republican	Todd Jones (incumbent)	3,048	75.7%
Republican	Cary Lucas	976	24.3%
Total votes		4,024	100%

25th district Democratic primary
Party	Candidate	Votes	%
Democratic	Elaine Padgett	1,468	100%
Total votes		1,468	100%

25th district general election
Party	Candidate	Votes	%
Republican	Todd Jones (incumbent)	18,747	61.0%
Democratic	Elaine Padgett	11,979	39.0%
Total votes		30,726	100%
Republican hold			

=== District 26 ===
2nd term incumbent Republican Lauren McDonald had represented the district since 2021.

26th district Republican primary
Party	Candidate	Votes	%
Republican	Lauren McDonald (incumbent)	3,978	100%
Total votes		3,978	100%

26th district Democratic primary
Party	Candidate	Votes	%
Democratic	Lakiea Bailey	1,011	100%
Total votes		1,011	100%

26th district general election
Party	Candidate	Votes	%
Republican	Lauren McDonald (incumbent)	22,258	70.8%
Democratic	Lakiea Bailey	9,191	29.2%
Total votes		31,449	100%
Republican hold			

=== District 27 ===
6th term incumbent Republican Lee Hawkins had represented the district since 2013.

27th district Republican primary
Party	Candidate	Votes	%
Republican	Lee Hawkins (incumbent)	7,911	100%
Total votes		7,911	100%

27th district general election
Party	Candidate	Votes	%
Republican	Lee Hawkins (incumbent)	30,558	100%
Total votes		30,558	100%
Republican hold			

=== District 28 ===
1st term incumbent Republican Brent Cox had represented the district since 2023.

28th district Republican primary
Party	Candidate	Votes	%
Republican	Brent Cox (incumbent)	4,705	100%
Total votes		4,705	100%

28th district Democratic primary
Party	Candidate	Votes	%
Democratic	Michael Henson	804	100%
Total votes		804	100%

28th district general election
Party	Candidate	Votes	%
Republican	Brent Cox (incumbent)	26,500	78.3%
Democratic	Michael Henson	7,350	21.7%
Total votes		33,850	100%
Republican hold			

=== District 29 ===
4th term incumbent Republican Matt Dubnik had represented the district since 2017.

29th district Republican primary
Party	Candidate	Votes	%
Republican	Matt Dubnik (incumbent)	2,856	100%
Total votes		2,856	100%

29th district general election
Party	Candidate	Votes	%
Republican	Matt Dubnik (incumbent)	16,007	100%
Total votes		16,007	100%
Republican hold			

=== District 30 ===
1st term incumbent Republican Derrick McCollum had represented the district since 2023.

30th district Republican primary
Party	Candidate	Votes	%
Republican	Derrick McCollum (incumbent)	5,182	84.2%
Republican	Norine Cantor	973	15.8%
Total votes		6,155	100%

30th district Democratic primary
Party	Candidate	Votes	%
Democratic	Kim Floria	1,120	100%
Total votes		1,120	100%

30th district general election
Party	Candidate	Votes	%
Republican	Derrick McCollum (incumbent)	25,087	73.0%
Democratic	Kim Floria	9,278	27.0%
Total votes		34,365	100%
Republican hold			

=== District 31 ===
7th term incumbent Republican Emory Dunahoo had represented the district since 2011.

31st district Republican primary
Party	Candidate	Votes	%
Republican	Emory Dunahoo (incumbent)	6,154	100%
Total votes		6,154	100%

31st district general election
Party	Candidate	Votes	%
Republican	Emory Dunahoo (incumbent)	30,344	100%
Total votes		30,344	100%
Republican hold			

=== District 32 ===
1st term incumbent Republican Chris Erwin had represented the district since 2023.

32nd district Republican primary
Party	Candidate	Votes	%
Republican	Chris Erwin (incumbent)	8,032	100%
Total votes		8,032	100%

32nd district general election
Party	Candidate	Votes	%
Republican	Chris Erwin (incumbent)	27,370	100%
Total votes		27,370	100%
Republican hold			

=== District 33 ===
17th term incumbent Republican Alan Powell had represented the district since 1991.

33rd district Republican primary
Party	Candidate	Votes	%
Republican	Alan Powell (incumbent)	9,182	100%
Total votes		9,182	100%

33rd district general election
Party	Candidate	Votes	%
Republican	Alan Powell (incumbent)	29,061	100%
Total votes		29,061	100%
Republican hold			

=== District 34 ===
2nd term incumbent Republican Devan Seabaugh had represented the district since 2021.

34th district Republican primary
Party	Candidate	Votes	%
Republican	Devan Seabaugh (incumbent)	4,252	100%
Total votes		4,252	100%

34th district Democratic primary
Party	Candidate	Votes	%
Democratic	Karl Gallegos	3,374	100%
Total votes		3,374	100%

34th district general election
Party	Candidate	Votes	%
Republican	Devan Seabaugh (incumbent)	21,849	57.7%
Democratic	Karl Gallegos	16,053	42.4%
Total votes		37,902	100%
Republican hold			

=== District 35 ===
1st term incumbent Democratic Lisa Campbell had represented the district since 2023.

35th district Republican primary
Party	Candidate	Votes	%
Republican	Gary Chaffee	1,418	100%
Total votes		1,418	100%

35th district Democratic primary
Party	Candidate	Votes	%
Democratic	Lisa Campbell (incumbent)	2,184	100%
Total votes		2,184	100%

35th district general election
Party	Candidate	Votes	%
Democratic	Lisa Campbell (incumbent)	16,279	60.8%
Republican	Gary Chaffee	10,501	39.2%
Total votes		26,780	100%
Democratic hold			

=== District 36 ===
3rd term incumbent Republican Ginny Ehrhart had represented the district since 2019.

36th district Republican primary
Party	Candidate	Votes	%
Republican	Ginny Ehrhart (incumbent)	3,654	100%
Total votes		3,654	100%

36th district general election
Party	Candidate	Votes	%
Republican	Ginny Ehrhart (incumbent)	29,260	100%
Total votes		29,260	100%
Republican hold			

=== District 37 ===
3rd term incumbent Democratic Mary Frances Williams represented the district since 2019.

37th district Republican primary
Party	Candidate	Votes	%
Republican	Shea Taylor	2,141	100%
Total votes		2,141	100%

37th district Democratic primary
Party	Candidate	Votes	%
Democratic	Mary Frances Williams (incumbent)	2,794	100%
Total votes		2,794	100%

37th district general election
Party	Candidate	Votes	%
Democratic	Mary Frances Williams (incumbent)	14,748	55.7%
Republican	Shea Taylor	11,725	44.3%
Total votes		26,473	100%
Democratic hold			

=== District 38 ===
7th term incumbent Democratic David Wilkerson had represented the district since 2011.

38th district Democratic primary
Party	Candidate	Votes	%
Democratic	David Wilkerson (incumbent)	3,948	79.9%
Democratic	Martine Maignan	993	20.1%
Total votes		4,941	100%

38th district general election
Party	Candidate	Votes	%
Democratic	David Wilkerson (incumbent)	25,094	100%
Total votes		25,094	100%
Democratic hold			

=== District 39 ===
1st term incumbent Democratic Terry Cummings had represented the district since 2023.

39th district Democratic primary
Party	Candidate	Votes	%
Democratic	Terry Cummings (incumbent)	4,761	100%
Total votes		4,761	100%

39th district general election
Party	Candidate	Votes	%
Democratic	Terry Cummings (incumbent)	22,774	100%
Total votes		22,774	100%
Democratic hold			

=== District 40 ===
1st term incumbent Democratic Doug Stoner had represented the district since 2023.

40th district Republican primary
Party	Candidate	Votes	%
Republican	Kimberly New (incumbent)	3,767	100%
Total votes		3,767	100%

40th district Democratic primary
Party	Candidate	Votes	%
Democratic	Montenia Edwards	1,864	62.3%
Democratic	Abby Amore	1,127	37.7%
Total votes		2,991	100%

40th district general election
Party	Candidate	Votes	%
Republican	Kimberly New (incumbent)	18,869	59.3%
Democratic	Montenia Edwards	12,924	40.7%
Total votes		31,793	100%
Republican hold			

=== District 41 ===
6th term incumbent Democratic Michael Smith had represented the district since 2013.

41st district Republican primary
Party	Candidate	Votes	%
Republican	Andrea Smith	980	100%
Total votes		980	100%

41st district Democratic primary
Party	Candidate	Votes	%
Democratic	Michael Smith (incumbent)	3,166	100%
Total votes		3,166	100%

41st district general election
Party	Candidate	Votes	%
Democratic	Michael Smith (incumbent)	15,280	70.0%
Republican	Andrea Smith	6,542	30.0%
Total votes		21,822	100%
Democratic hold			

=== District 42 ===
4th term incumbent Democratic Teri Anulewicz had represented the district since 2017.

42nd district Republican primary
Party	Candidate	Votes	%
Republican	Diane Jackson	1,230	100%
Total votes		1,230	100%

42nd district Democratic primary
Party	Candidate	Votes	%
Democratic	Gabriel Sanchez	2,253	56.8%
Democratic	Teri Anulewicz (incumbent)	1,713	43.2%
Total votes		3,966	100%

42nd district general election
Party	Candidate	Votes	%
Democratic	Gabriel Sanchez	16,689	63.3%
Republican	Diane Jackson	9,673	36.7%
Total votes		26,362	100%
Democratic hold			

=== District 43 ===
1st term incumbent Democratic Solomon Adesanya had represented the district since 2023.

43rd district Democratic primary
Party	Candidate	Votes	%
Democratic	Solomon Adesanya (incumbent)	2,168	100%
Total votes		2,168	100%

43rd district general election
Party	Candidate	Votes	%
Democratic	Solomon Adesanya (incumbent)	18,742	100%
Total votes		18,742	100%
Democratic hold			

=== District 44 ===
15th term incumbent Republican Don Parsons had represented the district since 1995.

44th district Republican primary
Party	Candidate	Votes	%
Republican	Don Parsons (incumbent)	3,268	100%
Total votes		3,268	100%

44th district Democratic primary
Party	Candidate	Votes	%
Democratic	Danielle Bell	2,302	100%
Total votes		2,302	100%

44th district general election
Party	Candidate	Votes	%
Republican	Don Parsons (incumbent)	19,216	56.9%
Democratic	Danielle Bell	14,571	43.1%
Total votes		33,787	100%
Republican hold			

=== District 45 ===
14th term incumbent Republican Sharon Cooper had represented the district since 1997.

45th district Republican primary
Party	Candidate	Votes	%
Republican	Sharon Cooper (incumbent)	4,317	100%
Total votes		4,317	100%

45th district Democratic primary
Party	Candidate	Votes	%
Democratic	Eric Castater	3,141	100%
Total votes		3,141	100%

45th district general election
Party	Candidate	Votes	%
Republican	Sharon Cooper (incumbent)	21,650	57.5%
Democratic	Eric Castater	16,027	42.5%
Total votes		37,677	100%
Republican hold			

=== District 46 ===
7th term incumbent Republican John Carson had represented the district since 2011.

46th district Republican primary
Party	Candidate	Votes	%
Republican	John Carson (incumbent)	3,748	100%
Total votes		3,748	100%

46th district Democratic primary
Party	Candidate	Votes	%
Democratic	Michael Garza	2,622	100%
Total votes		2,622	100%

46th district general election
Party	Candidate	Votes	%
Republican	John Carson (incumbent)	21,875	58.9%
Democratic	Michael Garza	15,274	41.1%
Total votes		37,149	100%
Republican hold			

=== District 47 ===
11th term incumbent Republican Jan Jones had represented the district since 2003.

47th district Republican primary
Party	Candidate	Votes	%
Republican	Jan Jones (incumbent)	2,230	80.8%
Republican	Phoebe Eckhardt	529	19.2%
Total votes		2,759	100%

47th district Democratic primary
Party	Candidate	Votes	%
Democratic	Debra Shigley	1,382	66.2%
Democratic	Anthia Carter	706	33.8%
Total votes		2,088	100%

47th district general election
Party	Candidate	Votes	%
Republican	Jan Jones (incumbent)	19,537	61.6%
Democratic	Debra Shigley	12,189	38.4%
Total votes		31,726	100%
Republican hold			

=== District 48 ===
1st term incumbent Republican Scott Hilton had represented the district since 2023.

48th district Republican primary
Party	Candidate	Votes	%
Republican	Scott Hilton (incumbent)	3,025	100%
Total votes		3,025	100%

48th district Democratic primary
Party	Candidate	Votes	%
Democratic	Laura Murvartian	2,632	100%
Total votes		2,632	100%

48th district general election
Party	Candidate	Votes	%
Republican	Scott Hilton (incumbent)	18,183	54.9%
Democratic	Laura Murvartian	14,954	45.1%
Total votes		33,137	100%
Republican hold			

=== District 49 ===
11th term incumbent Republican Chuck Martin had represented the district since 2003.

49th district Republican primary
Party	Candidate	Votes	%
Republican	Chuck Martin (incumbent)	2,610	72.4%
Republican	Michael Gordon	995	27.6%
Total votes		3,605	100%

49th district Democratic primary
Party	Candidate	Votes	%
Democratic	Grace Demit	1,598	63.2%
Democratic	Charles Squires	932	36.8%
Total votes		2,530	100%

49th district general election
Party	Candidate	Votes	%
Republican	Chuck Martin (incumbent)	21,944	59.5%
Democratic	Grace Demit	14,937	40.5%
Total votes		36,881	100%
Republican hold			

=== District 50 ===
1st term incumbent Democratic Michelle Au had represented the district since 2023.

50th district Republican primary
Party	Candidate	Votes	%
Republican	Narender Reddy	1,405	100%
Total votes		1,405	100%

50th district Democratic primary
Party	Candidate	Votes	%
Democratic	Michelle Au (incumbent)	2,223	100%
Total votes		2,223	100%

50th district general election
Party	Candidate	Votes	%
Democratic	Michelle Au (incumbent)	15,868	55.4%
Republican	Narender Reddy	12,801	44.6%
Total votes		28,669	100%
Democratic hold			

=== District 51 ===
1st term incumbent Democratic Esther Panitch had represented the district since 2023.

51st district Republican primary
Party	Candidate	Votes	%
Republican	Derek Gettmann	1,755	100%
Total votes		1,755	100%

51st district Democratic primary
Party	Candidate	Votes	%
Democratic	Esther Panitch (incumbent)	2,704	100%
Total votes		2,704	100%

51st district general election
Party	Candidate	Votes	%
Democratic	Esther Panitch (incumbent)	16,558	58.1%
Republican	Derek Gettmann	11,959	41.9%
Total votes		28,517	100%
Democratic hold			

=== District 52 ===
2nd term incumbent Democratic Shea Roberts had represented the district since 2021.

52nd district Republican primary
Party	Candidate	Votes	%
Republican	Robert McNeily	1,340	100%
Total votes		1,340	100%

52nd district Democratic primary
Party	Candidate	Votes	%
Democratic	Shea Roberts (incumbent)	3,283	100%
Total votes		3,283	100%

52nd district general election
Party	Candidate	Votes	%
Democratic	Shea Roberts (incumbent)	18,199	61.7%
Republican	Robert McNeily	11,321	38.3%
Total votes		29,520	100%
Democratic hold			

=== District 53 ===
1st term incumbent Republican Deborah Silcox had represented the district since 2023.

53rd district Republican primary
Party	Candidate	Votes	%
Republican	Deborah Silcox (incumbent)	2,504	100%
Total votes		2,504	100%

53rd district Democratic primary
Party	Candidate	Votes	%
Democratic	Susie Greenberg	3,262	100%
Total votes		3,262	100%

53rd district general election
Party	Candidate	Votes	%
Republican	Deborah Silcox (incumbent)	18,277	51.9%
Democratic	Susie Greenberg	16,926	48.1%
Total votes		35,203	100%
Republican hold			

=== District 54 ===
3rd term incumbent Democratic Betsy Holland had represented the district since 2019.

54th district Republican primary
Party	Candidate	Votes	%
Republican	Sam Brown-Parks	1,146	100%
Total votes		1,146	100%

54th district Democratic primary
Party	Candidate	Votes	%
Democratic	Betsy Holland (incumbent)	3,101	100%
Total votes		3,101	100%

54th district general election
Party	Candidate	Votes	%
Democratic	Betsy Holland (incumbent)	17,950	59.7%
Republican	Sam Brown-Parks	12,133	40.3%
Total votes		30,083	100%
Democratic hold			

=== District 55 ===
1st term incumbent Democratic Inga Willis had represented the district since 2023.

55th district Republican primary
Party	Candidate	Votes	%
Republican	Samuel Lenaeus	509	100%
Total votes		509	100%

55th district Democratic primary
Party	Candidate	Votes	%
Democratic	Inga Willis (incumbent)	4,780	100%
Total votes		4,780	100%

55th district general election
Party	Candidate	Votes	%
Democratic	Inga Willis (incumbent)	21,440	77.9%
Republican	Samuel Lenaeus	6,095	22.1%
Total votes		27,535	100%
Democratic hold			

=== District 56 ===
2nd term incumbent Republican Mesha Mainor had represented the district since 2021.

56th district Republican primary
Party	Candidate	Votes	%
Republican	Mesha Mainor (incumbent)	114	100%
Total votes		114	100%

56th district Democratic primary
Party	Candidate	Votes	%
Democratic	Bryce Berry	1,976	54.1%
Democratic	Leonard Watkins	763	20.9%
Democratic	Ada Merello	721	19.7%
Democratic	Corwin Monson	194	5.3%
Total votes		3,654	100%

56th district general election
Party	Candidate	Votes	%
Democratic	Bryce Berry	19,223	83.8%
Republican	Mesha Mainor (incumbent)	3,722	16.2%
Total votes		22,945	100%
Democratic gain from Republican			

=== District 57 ===
2nd term incumbent Democratic Stacey Evans had represented the district since 2021.

57th district Republican primary
Party	Candidate	Votes	%
Republican	Julie Allen	607	100%
Total votes		607	100%

57th district Democratic primary
Party	Candidate	Votes	%
Democratic	Stacey Evans (incumbent)	5,364	100%
Total votes		5,364	100%

57th district general election
Party	Candidate	Votes	%
Democratic	Stacey Evans (incumbent)	25,241	78.9%
Republican	Julie Allen	6,763	21.1%
Total votes		32,004	100%
Democratic hold			

=== District 58 ===
5th term incumbent Democratic Park Cannon had represented the district since 2016.

58th district Democratic primary
Party	Candidate	Votes	%
Democratic	Park Cannon (incumbent)	5,460	100%
Total votes		5,460	100%

58th district general election
Party	Candidate	Votes	%
Democratic	Park Cannon (incumbent)	25,422	100%
Total votes		25,422	100%
Democratic hold			

=== District 59 ===
1st term incumbent Democratic Phil Olaleye had represented the district since 2023.

59th district Republican primary
Party	Candidate	Votes	%
Republican	Maurice Mpayamaguru	122	100%
Total votes		122	100%

59th district Democratic primary
Party	Candidate	Votes	%
Democratic	Phil Olaleye (incumbent)	5,073	100%
Total votes		5,073	100%

59th district general election
Party	Candidate	Votes	%
Democratic	Phil Olaleye (incumbent)	22,848	90.8%
Republican	Maurice Mpayamaguru	2,312	9.2%
Total votes		25,160	100%
Democratic hold			

=== District 60 ===
10th term incumbent Democratic Sheila Jones had represented the district since 2005.

60th district Republican primary
Party	Candidate	Votes	%
Republican	Cathy Henson	1,059	100%
Total votes		1,059	100%

60th district Democratic primary
Party	Candidate	Votes	%
Democratic	Sheila Jones (incumbent)	4,226	79.7%
Democratic	Diane Clair	1,078	20.3%
Total votes		5,304	100%

60th district general election
Party	Candidate	Votes	%
Democratic	Sheila Jones (incumbent)	21,692	71.6%
Republican	Cathy Henson	8,613	28.4%
Total votes		30,305	100%
Democratic hold			

=== District 61 ===
11th term incumbent Democratic Roger Bruce had represented the district since 2003.

61st district Democratic primary
Party	Candidate	Votes	%
Democratic	Mekyah McQueen	4,770	64.6%
Democratic	De'Lonn Brown	2,610	35.4%
Total votes		7,380	100%

61st district general election
Party	Candidate	Votes	%
Democratic	Mekyah McQueen	28,977	100%
Total votes		28,977	100%
Democratic hold			

=== District 62 ===
1st term incumbent Democratic Tanya F. Miller had represented the district since 2023.

62nd district Democratic primary
Party	Candidate	Votes	%
Democratic	Tanya F. Miller (incumbent)	5,967	100%
Total votes		5,967	100%

62nd district general election
Party	Candidate	Votes	%
Democratic	Tanya F. Miller (incumbent)	24,767	100%
Total votes		24,767	100%
Democratic hold			

=== District 63 ===
4th term incumbent Democratic Kim Schofield had represented the district since 2017.

63rd district Democratic primary
Party	Candidate	Votes	%
Democratic	Kim Schofield (incumbent)	4,770	100%
Total votes		4,770	100%

63rd district general election
Party	Candidate	Votes	%
Democratic	Kim Schofield (incumbent)	22,266	100%
Total votes		22,266	100%
Democratic hold			

=== District 64 ===
1st term incumbent Democratic Kimberly New had represented the district since 2023.

64th district Republican primary
Party	Candidate	Votes	%
Republican	Cassaundra Burks	1,322	100%
Total votes		1,322	100%

64th district Democratic primary
Party	Candidate	Votes	%
Democratic	Sylvia Wayfer Baker	5,906	100%
Total votes		5,906	100%

64th district general election
Party	Candidate	Votes	%
Democratic	Sylvia Wayfer Baker	21,529	69.2%
Republican	Cassaundra Burks	9,569	30.8%
Total votes		31,098	100%
Democratic hold			

=== District 65 ===
2nd term incumbent Democratic Mandisha Thomas had represented the district since 2021.

65th district Democratic primary
Party	Candidate	Votes	%
Democratic	Robert Dawson	4,339	53.9%
Democratic	De'Andre Pickett	1,970	24.5%
Democratic	Sam Wakefield	1,040	12.9%
Democratic	Mel Keyton	694	8.7%
Total votes		8,043	100%

65th district general election
Party	Candidate	Votes	%
Democratic	Robert Dawson	29,876	100%
Total votes		29,876	100%
Democratic hold			

=== District 66 ===
6th term incumbent Democratic Kimberly Alexander had represented the district since 2013.

66th district Democratic primary
Party	Candidate	Votes	%
Democratic	Kimberly Alexander (incumbent)	4,582	100%
Total votes		4,582	100%

66th district general election
Party	Candidate	Votes	%
Democratic	Kimberly Alexander (incumbent)	21,161	100%
Total votes		21,161	100%
Democratic hold			

=== District 67 ===
1st term incumbent Democratic Lydia Glaize had represented the district since 2023.

67th district Republican primary
Party	Candidate	Votes	%
Republican	Matthew Hammett	1,339	73.0%
Republican	Kevin Smith	494	27.0%
Total votes		1,833	100%

67th district Democratic primary
Party	Candidate	Votes	%
Democratic	Lydia Glaize (incumbent)	4,445	100%
Total votes		4,445	100%

67th district general election
Party	Candidate	Votes	%
Democratic	Lydia Glaize (incumbent)	19,629	66.5%
Republican	Matthew Hammett	9,891	33.5%
Total votes		29,520	100%
Democratic hold			

=== District 68 ===
1st term incumbent Democratic Derrick Jackson had represented the district since 2023.

68th district Democratic primary
Party	Candidate	Votes	%
Democratic	Derrick Jackson (incumbent)	4,314	100%
Total votes		4,314	100%

68th district general election
Party	Candidate	Votes	%
Democratic	Derrick Jackson (incumbent)	24,208	100%
Total votes		24,208	100%
Democratic hold			

=== District 69 ===
4th term incumbent Democratic Debra Bazemore had represented the district since 2017.

69th district Democratic primary
Party	Candidate	Votes	%
Democratic	Debra Bazemore (incumbent)	5,339	73.9%
Democratic	Ray Mills	853	11.8%
Democratic	Bobby Ferrell	470	6.5%
Democratic	Jared Daigre	303	4.2%
Democratic	Cobie Brown	258	3.6%
Total votes		7,223	100%

69th district general election
Party	Candidate	Votes	%
Democratic	Debra Bazemore (incumbent)	27,191	100%
Total votes		27,191	100%
Democratic hold			

=== District 70 ===
14th term incumbent Republican Lynn Smith had represented the district since 1997.

70th district Republican primary
Party	Candidate	Votes	%
Republican	Lynn Smith (incumbent)	3,292	100%
Total votes		3,292	100%

70th district Democratic primary
Party	Candidate	Votes	%
Democratic	Diane Boulai	1,232	100%
Total votes		1,232	100%

70th district general election
Party	Candidate	Votes	%
Republican	Lynn Smith (incumbent)	17,597	63.4%
Democratic	Diane Boulai	10,166	36.6%
Total votes		27,763	100%
Republican hold			

=== District 71 ===
4th term incumbent Republican J. Collins had represented the district since 2017.

71st district Republican primary
Party	Candidate	Votes	%
Republican	Jutt Howard	3,032	71.5%
Republican	Marc Lattanzio	1,207	28.5%
Total votes		4,239	100%

71st district Democratic primary
Party	Candidate	Votes	%
Democratic	Kwasi Hudson	1,365	100%
Total votes		1,365	100%

71st district general election
Party	Candidate	Votes	%
Republican	Jutt Howard	20,442	67.0%
Democratic	Kwasi Hudson	10,092	33.0%
Total votes		30,534	100%
Republican hold			

=== District 72 ===
1st term incumbent Republican David Huddleston had represented the district since 2023.

72nd district Republican primary
Party	Candidate	Votes	%
Republican	David Huddleston (incumbent)	6,391	100%
Total votes		6,391	100%

72nd district Democratic primary
Party	Candidate	Votes	%
Democratic	Rodney Moore	914	100%
Total votes		914	100%

72nd district general election
Party	Candidate	Votes	%
Republican	David Huddleston (incumbent)	21,281	75.5%
Democratic	Rodney Moore	6,909	24.5%
Total votes		28,190	100%
Republican hold			

=== District 73 ===
4th term incumbent Republican Josh Bonner had represented the district since 2017.

73rd district Republican primary
Party	Candidate	Votes	%
Republican	Josh Bonner (incumbent)	5,157	100%
Total votes		5,157	100%

73rd district Democratic primary
Party	Candidate	Votes	%
Democratic	Tom Thomason	935	50.5%
Democratic	Tim Wilkinson	918	49.5%
Total votes		1,853	100%

73rd district general election
Party	Candidate	Votes	%
Republican	Josh Bonner (incumbent)	25,111	66.9%
Democratic	Tom Thomason	12,436	33.1%
Total votes		37,547	100%
Republican hold			

=== District 74 ===
1st term incumbent Republican Karen Mathiak had represented the district since 2023.

74th district Democratic primary
Party	Candidate	Votes	%
Democratic	Robert Flournoy Jr	2,798	51.4%
Democratic	Maggy Martinez	2,650	48.6%
Total votes		5,448	100%

74th district general election
Party	Candidate	Votes	%
Democratic	Robert Flournoy Jr	25,139	100%
Total votes		25,139	100%
Democratic hold			

=== District 75 ===
1st term incumbent Democratic Eric Bell II had represented the district since 2023.

75th district Democratic primary
Party	Candidate	Votes	%
Democratic	Eric Bell II (incumbent)	3,366	70.0%
Democratic	Michael Glanton Jr	1,445	30.0%
Total votes		4,811	100%

75th district general election
Party	Candidate	Votes	%
Democratic	Eric Bell II (incumbent)	20,971	100%
Total votes		20,971	100%
Democratic hold			

=== District 76 ===
7th term incumbent Democratic Sandra Scott had represented the district since 2011.

76th district Democratic primary
Party	Candidate	Votes	%
Democratic	Sandra Scott (incumbent)	4,604	100%
Total votes		4,604	100%

76th district general election
Party	Candidate	Votes	%
Democratic	Sandra Scott (incumbent)	20,380	100%
Total votes		20,380	100%
Democratic hold			

=== District 77 ===
4th term incumbent Democratic Rhonda Burnough had represented the district since 2017.

77th district Democratic primary
Party	Candidate	Votes	%
Democratic	Rhonda Burnough (incumbent)	3,599	100%
Total votes		3,599	100%

77th district general election
Party	Candidate	Votes	%
Democratic	Rhonda Burnough (incumbent)	18,552	100%
Total votes		18,552	100%
Democratic hold			

=== District 78 ===
6th term incumbent Democratic Demetrius Douglas had represented the district since 2013.

78th district Democratic primary
Party	Candidate	Votes	%
Democratic	Demetrius Douglas (incumbent)	5,058	100%
Total votes		5,058	100%

78th district general election
Party	Candidate	Votes	%
Democratic	Demetrius Douglas (incumbent)	24,908	100%
Total votes		24,908	100%
Democratic hold			

=== District 79 ===
7th term incumbent Democratic Yasmin Neal had represented the district since 2011.

79th district Democratic primary
Party	Candidate	Votes	%
Democratic	Yasmin Neal (incumbent)	2,788	100%
Total votes		2,788	100%

79th district general election
Party	Candidate	Votes	%
Democratic	Yasmin Neal (incumbent)	16,118	100%
Total votes		16,118	100%
Democratic hold			

=== District 80 ===
1st term incumbent Democratic Long Tran had represented the district since 2023.

80th district Republican primary
Party	Candidate	Votes	%
Republican	Brian Anderson	1,567	100%
Total votes		1,567	100%

80th district Democratic primary
Party	Candidate	Votes	%
Democratic	Long Tran (incumbent)	3,736	100%
Total votes		3,736	100%

80th district general election
Party	Candidate	Votes	%
Democratic	Long Tran (incumbent)	15,457	59.6%
Republican	Brian Anderson	10,473	40.4%
Total votes		25,930	100%
Democratic hold			

=== District 81 ===
7th term incumbent Democratic Scott Holcomb had represented the district since 2011.

81st district Republican primary
Party	Candidate	Votes	%
Republican	Noelle Kahaian	2,665	52.8%
Republican	Lauren Daniel (incumbent)	2,387	47.2%
Total votes		5,052	100%

81st district Democratic primary
Party	Candidate	Votes	%
Democratic	Mishael White	3,220	100%
Total votes		3,220	100%

81st district general election
Party	Candidate	Votes	%
Republican	Noelle Kahaian	19,186	57.0%
Democratic	Mishael White	14,469	43.0%
Total votes		33,655	100%
Republican hold			

=== District 82 ===
11th term incumbent Democratic Mary Margaret Oliver had represented the district since 2003.

82nd district Republican primary
Party	Candidate	Votes	%
Republican	Karen Mathiak (incumbent)	5,059	100%
Total votes		5,059	100%

82nd district Democratic primary
Party	Candidate	Votes	%
Democratic	Anthony Dickson	2,273	100%
Total votes		2,273	100%

82nd district general election
Party	Candidate	Votes	%
Republican	Karen Mathiak (incumbent)	20,984	63.0%
Democratic	Anthony Dickson	12,351	37.0%
Total votes		33,335	100%
Republican hold			

=== District 83 ===
1st term incumbent Democratic Karen Lupton had represented the district since 2023.

83rd district Republican primary
Party	Candidate	Votes	%
Republican	Catherine Bernard	576	100%
Total votes		576	100%

83rd district Democratic primary
Party	Candidate	Votes	%
Democratic	Karen Lupton (incumbent)	2,241	100%
Total votes		2,241	100%

83rd district general election
Party	Candidate	Votes	%
Democratic	Karen Lupton (incumbent)	14,170	63.1%
Republican	Catherine Bernard	8,281	36.9%
Total votes		22,451	100%
Democratic hold			

=== District 84 ===
1st term incumbent Democratic Omari Crawford had represented the district since 2023.

84th district Democratic primary
Party	Candidate	Votes	%
Democratic	Mary Margaret Oliver (incumbent)	7,416	89.4%
Democratic	Hunter Kemp	880	10.6%
Total votes		8,296	100%

84th district general election
Party	Candidate	Votes	%
Democratic	Mary Margaret Oliver (incumbent)	28,980	100%
Total votes		28,980	100%
Democratic hold			

=== District 85 ===
12th term incumbent Democratic Karla Drenner had represented the district since 2001.

85th district Democratic primary
Party	Candidate	Votes	%
Democratic	Karla Drenner (incumbent)	5,162	100%
Total votes		5,162	100%

85th district general election
Party	Candidate	Votes	%
Democratic	Karla Drenner (incumbent)	22,384	100%
Total votes		22,384	100%
Democratic hold			

=== District 86 ===
1st term incumbent Democratic Imani Barnes had represented the district since 2023.

86th district Republican primary
Party	Candidate	Votes	%
Republican	Barry Zisholtz	428	100%
Total votes		428	100%

86th district Democratic primary
Party	Candidate	Votes	%
Democratic	Imani Barnes (incumbent)	4,881	100%
Total votes		4,881	100%

86th district general election
Party	Candidate	Votes	%
Democratic	Imani Barnes (incumbent)	19,737	80.0%
Republican	Barry Zisholtz	4,936	20.0%
Total votes		24,673	100%
Democratic hold			

=== District 87 ===
3rd term incumbent Democratic Viola Davis had represented the district since 2019.

87th district Democratic primary
Party	Candidate	Votes	%
Democratic	Viola Davis (incumbent)	5,041	100%
Total votes		5,041	100%

87th district general election
Party	Candidate	Votes	%
Democratic	Viola Davis (incumbent)	22,753	100%
Total votes		22,753	100%
Democratic hold			

=== District 88 ===
11th term incumbent Democratic Billy Mitchell had represented the district since 2003.

88th district Republican primary
Party	Candidate	Votes	%
Republican	William Freeman	634	100%
Total votes		634	100%

88th district Democratic primary
Party	Candidate	Votes	%
Democratic	Billy Mitchell (incumbent)	5,137	100%
Total votes		5,137	100%

88th district general election
Party	Candidate	Votes	%
Democratic	Billy Mitchell (incumbent)	20,711	80.1%
Republican	William Freeman	5,132	19.9%
Total votes		25,843	100%
Democratic hold			

=== District 89 ===
1st term incumbent Democratic Becky Evans had represented the district since 2023.

89th district Democratic primary
Party	Candidate	Votes	%
Democratic	Omari Crawford (incumbent)	7,436	100%
Total votes		7,436	100%

89th district general election
Party	Candidate	Votes	%
Democratic	Omari Crawford (incumbent)	30,293	100%
Total votes		30,293	100%
Democratic hold			

=== District 90 ===
1st term incumbent Democratic Saira Draper had represented the district since 2023.

90th district Democratic primary
Party	Candidate	Votes	%
Democratic	Saira Draper (incumbent)	5,957	67.6%
Democratic	Becky Evans (incumbent)	2,852	32.4%
Total votes		8,809	100%

90th district general election
Party	Candidate	Votes	%
Democratic	Saira Draper (incumbent)	30,637	100%
Total votes		30,637	100%
Democratic hold			

=== District 91 ===
2nd term incumbent Democratic Angela Moore had represented the district since 2021.

91st district Democratic primary
Party	Candidate	Votes	%
Democratic	Angela Moore (incumbent)	4,009	53.4%
Democratic	Dee Dawkins-Haigler	2,646	35.3%
Democratic	Marcus Akins	846	11.3%
Total votes		7,501	100%

91st district general election
Party	Candidate	Votes	%
Democratic	Angela Moore (incumbent)	25,823	100%
Total votes		25,823	100%
Democratic hold			

=== District 92 ===
2nd term incumbent Democratic Rhonda Taylor had represented the district since 2021.

92nd district Democratic primary
Party	Candidate	Votes	%
Democratic	Rhonda Taylor (incumbent)	6,993	100%
Total votes		6,993	100%

92nd district general election
Party	Candidate	Votes	%
Democratic	Rhonda Taylor (incumbent)	24,823	100%
Total votes		24,823	100%
Democratic hold			

=== District 93 ===
5th term incumbent Democratic Doreen Carter had represented the district since 2015.

93rd district Democratic primary
Party	Candidate	Votes	%
Democratic	Doreen Carter (incumbent)	4,161	100%
Total votes		4,161	100%

93rd district general election
Party	Candidate	Votes	%
Democratic	Doreen Carter (incumbent)	23,317	100%
Total votes		23,317	100%
Democratic hold			

=== District 94 ===
6th term incumbent Democratic Karen Bennett had represented the district since 2013.

94th district Democratic primary
Party	Candidate	Votes	%
Democratic	Karen Bennett (incumbent)	5,248	100%
Total votes		5,248	100%

94th district general election
Party	Candidate	Votes	%
Democratic	Karen Bennett (incumbent)	25,781	100%
Total votes		25,781	100%
Democratic hold			

=== District 95 ===
1st term incumbent Democratic Dar'shun Kendrick had represented the district since 2023.

95th district Democratic primary
Party	Candidate	Votes	%
Democratic	Dar'shun Kendrick (incumbent)	4,392	100%
Total votes		4,392	100%

95th district general election
Party	Candidate	Votes	%
Democratic	Dar'shun Kendrick (incumbent)	24,135	100%
Total votes		24,135	100%
Democratic hold			

=== District 96 ===
11th term incumbent Democratic Pedro Marin had represented the district since 2003.

96th district Democratic primary
Party	Candidate	Votes	%
Democratic	Arlene Beckles	506	39.2%
Democratic	Sonia Lopez	394	30.5%
Democratic	Neva Thompson	390	30.3%
Total votes		1,290	100%

96th district Democratic primary runoff
Party	Candidate	Votes	%
Democratic	Arlene Beckles	217	65.2%
Democratic	Sonia Lopez	116	34.8%
Total votes		333	100%

96th district general election
Party	Candidate	Votes	%
Democratic	Arlene Beckles	13,524	100%
Total votes		13,524	100%
Democratic hold			

=== District 97 ===
1st term incumbent Democratic Ruwa Romman had represented the district since 2023.

97th district Republican primary
Party	Candidate	Votes	%
Republican	Michael Corbin	1,534	100%
Total votes		1,534	100%

97th district Democratic primary
Party	Candidate	Votes	%
Democratic	Ruwa Romman (incumbent)	2,314	100%
Total votes		2,314	100%

97th district general election
Party	Candidate	Votes	%
Democratic	Ruwa Romman (incumbent)	14,536	58.8%
Republican	Michael Corbin	10,167	41.2%
Total votes		24,703	100%
Democratic hold			

=== District 98 ===
2nd term incumbent Democratic Marvin Lim had represented the district since 2021.

98th district Democratic primary
Party	Candidate	Votes	%
Democratic	Marvin Lim (incumbent)	904	82.3%
Democratic	Jorge Granados	194	17.7%
Total votes		1,098	100%

98th district general election
Party	Candidate	Votes	%
Democratic	Marvin Lim (incumbent)	9,283	100%
Total votes		9,283	100%
Democratic hold			

=== District 99 ===
1st term incumbent Republican Matt Reeves had represented the district since 2023.

99th district Republican primary
Party	Candidate	Votes	%
Republican	Matt Reeves (incumbent)	1,893	100%
Total votes		1,893	100%

99th district Democratic primary
Party	Candidate	Votes	%
Democratic	Michelle Kang	1,969	100%
Total votes		1,969	100%

99th district general election
Party	Candidate	Votes	%
Republican	Matt Reeves (incumbent)	14,812	51.1%
Democratic	Michelle Kang	14,191	48.9%
Total votes		29,003	100%
Republican hold			

=== District 100 ===
5th term incumbent Republican David Clark had represented the district since 2015.

100th district Republican primary
Party	Candidate	Votes	%
Republican	David Clark (incumbent)	2,801	78.0%
Republican	Michael Day	791	22.0%
Total votes		3,592	100%

100th district Democratic primary
Party	Candidate	Votes	%
Democratic	Jennifer Ambler	1,404	100%
Total votes		1,404	100%

100th district general election
Party	Candidate	Votes	%
Republican	David Clark (incumbent)	19,620	62.4%
Democratic	Jennifer Ambler	11,833	37.6%
Total votes		31,453	100%
Republican hold			

=== District 101 ===
4th term incumbent Democratic Gregg Kennard had represented the district since 2017.

101st district Republican primary
Party	Candidate	Votes	%
Republican	Kendra Biegalski	786	100%
Total votes		786	100%

101st district Democratic primary
Party	Candidate	Votes	%
Democratic	Scott Holcomb (incumbent)	4,068	100%
Total votes		4,068	100%

101st district general election
Party	Candidate	Votes	%
Democratic	Scott Holcomb (incumbent)	18,764	72.1%
Republican	Kendra Biegalski	7,252	27.9%
Total votes		26,016	100%
Democratic hold			

=== District 102 ===
4th term incumbent Democratic Gabe Okoye had represented the district since 2017.

102nd district Republican primary
Party	Candidate	Votes	%
Republican	J. Scott Vandiver	994	100%
Total votes		994	100%

102nd district Democratic primary
Party	Candidate	Votes	%
Democratic	Gabe Okoye (incumbent)	2,294	100%
Total votes		2,294	100%

102nd district general election
Party	Candidate	Votes	%
Democratic	Gabe Okoye (incumbent)	15,166	65.9%
Republican	J. Scott Vandiver	7,855	34.1%
Total votes		23,021	100%
Democratic hold			

=== District 103 ===
1st term incumbent Republican Soo Hong had represented the district since 2023.

103rd district Republican primary
Party	Candidate	Votes	%
Republican	Soo Hong (incumbent)	2,845	100%
Total votes		2,845	100%

103rd district Democratic primary
Party	Candidate	Votes	%
Democratic	Chris Luchey	1,663	100%
Total votes		1,663	100%

103rd district general election
Party	Candidate	Votes	%
Republican	Soo Hong (incumbent)	18,232	60.6%
Democratic	Chris Luchey	11,880	39.4%
Total votes		30,112	100%
Republican hold			

=== District 104 ===
6th term incumbent Republican Chuck Efstration had represented the district since 2013.

104th district Republican primary
Party	Candidate	Votes	%
Republican	Chuck Efstration (incumbent)	4,915	100%
Total votes		4,915	100%

104th district general election
Party	Candidate	Votes	%
Republican	Chuck Efstration (incumbent)	25,168	100%
Total votes		25,168	100%
Republican hold			

=== District 105 ===
1st term incumbent Democratic Farooq Mughal had represented the district since 2023.

105th district Republican primary
Party	Candidate	Votes	%
Republican	Sandy Donatucci	2,210	100%
Total votes		2,210	100%

105th district Democratic primary
Party	Candidate	Votes	%
Democratic	Farooq Mughal (incumbent)	2,292	100%
Total votes		2,292	100%

105th district general election
Party	Candidate	Votes	%
Republican	Sandy Donatucci	15,142	50.1%
Democratic	Farooq Mughal (incumbent)	15,062	49.9%
Total votes		30,204	100%
Republican gain from Democratic			

=== District 106 ===
3rd term incumbent Democratic Shelly Hutchinson had represented the district since 2019.

106th district Democratic primary
Party	Candidate	Votes	%
Democratic	Shelly Hutchinson (incumbent)	2,295	100%
Total votes		2,295	100%

106th district general election
Party	Candidate	Votes	%
Democratic	Shelly Hutchinson (incumbent)	19,029	100%
Total votes		19,029	100%
Democratic hold			

=== District 107 ===
1st term incumbent Democratic Sam Park had represented the district since 2023.

107th district Republican primary
Party	Candidate	Votes	%
Republican	Hai Cao	1,418	100%
Total votes		1,418	100%

107th district Democratic primary
Party	Candidate	Votes	%
Democratic	Sam Park (incumbent)	2,206	100%
Total votes		2,206	100%

107th district general election
Party	Candidate	Votes	%
Democratic	Sam Park (incumbent)	15,538	60.4%
Republican	Hai Cao	10,189	39.6%
Total votes			100%
Democratic hold			

=== District 108 ===
3rd term incumbent Democratic Jasmine Clark had represented the district since 2019.

108th district Republican primary
Party	Candidate	Votes	%
Republican	Elvia Davila	2,315	100%
Total votes		2,315	100%

108th district Democratic primary
Party	Candidate	Votes	%
Democratic	Jasmine Clark (incumbent)	2,937	100%
Total votes		2,937	100%

108th district general election
Party	Candidate	Votes	%
Democratic	Jasmine Clark (incumbent)	15,315	53.9%
Republican	Elvia Davila	13,118	46.1%
Total votes		28,433	100%
Democratic hold			

=== District 109 ===
1st term incumbent Democratic Dewey McClain had represented the district since 2023.

109th district Democratic primary
Party	Candidate	Votes	%
Democratic	Dewey McClain (incumbent)	1,134	100%
Total votes		1,134	100%

109th district general election
Party	Candidate	Votes	%
Democratic	Dewey McClain (incumbent)	12,657	100%
Total votes		12,657	100%
Democratic hold			

=== District 110 ===
1st term incumbent Democratic Segun Adeyina had represented the district since 2023.

110th district Republican primary
Party	Candidate	Votes	%
Republican	Charles Lollar	1,517	100%
Total votes		1,517	100%

110th district Democratic primary
Party	Candidate	Votes	%
Democratic	Segun Adeyina (incumbent)	3,653	100%
Total votes		3,653	100%

110th district general election
Party	Candidate	Votes	%
Democratic	Segun Adeyina (incumbent)	21,469	65.3%
Republican	Charles Lollar	11,410	34.7%
Total votes		32,879	100%
Democratic hold			

=== District 111 ===
1st term incumbent Republican Reynaldo Martinez had represented the district since 2023.

111th district Republican primary
Party	Candidate	Votes	%
Republican	Reynaldo Martinez (incumbent)	3,904	100%
Total votes		3,904	100%

111th district Democratic primary
Party	Candidate	Votes	%
Democratic	Scott Jackson	1,774	100%
Total votes		1,774	100%

111th district general election
Party	Candidate	Votes	%
Republican	Reynaldo Martinez (incumbent)	21,107	61.5%
Democratic	Scott Jackson	13,193	38.5%
Total votes		34,300	100%
Republican hold			

=== District 112 ===
1st term incumbent Republican Bruce Williamson had represented the district since 2023.

112th district Republican primary
Party	Candidate	Votes	%
Republican	Bruce Williamson (incumbent)	6,066	100%
Total votes		6,066	100%

112th district general election
Party	Candidate	Votes	%
Republican	Bruce Williamson (incumbent)	28,832	100%
Total votes		28,832	100%
Republican hold			

=== District 113 ===
2nd term incumbent Democratic Sharon Henderson had represented the district since 2021.

113th district Democratic primary
Party	Candidate	Votes	%
Democratic	Sharon Henderson (incumbent)	3,383	65.1%
Democratic	Karla Daniels Hooper	1,813	34.9%
Total votes		5,196	100%

113th district general election
Party	Candidate	Votes	%
Democratic	Sharon Henderson (incumbent)	24,149	100%
Total votes		24,149	100%
Democratic hold			

=== District 114 ===
1st term incumbent Republican Tim Fleming had represented the district since 2023.

114th district Republican primary
Party	Candidate	Votes	%
Republican	Tim Fleming (incumbent)	7,805	100%
Total votes		7,805	100%

114th district general election
Party	Candidate	Votes	%
Republican	Tim Fleming (incumbent)	30,394	100%
Total votes		30,394	100%
Republican hold			

=== District 115 ===
1st term incumbent Democratic Regina Lewis-Ward had represented the district since 2023.

115th district Democratic primary
Party	Candidate	Votes	%
Democratic	Regina Lewis-Ward (incumbent)	8,781	100%
Total votes		8,781	100%

115th district general election
Party	Candidate	Votes	%
Democratic	Regina Lewis-Ward (incumbent)	30,385	100%
Total votes		30,385	100%
Democratic hold			

=== District 116 ===
1st term incumbent Democratic El-Mahdi Holly had represented the district since 2023.

116th district Republican primary
Party	Candidate	Votes	%
Republican	Reign Stevens	641	100%
Total votes		641	100%

116th district Democratic primary
Party	Candidate	Votes	%
Democratic	El-Mahdi Holly (incumbent)	6,269	100%
Total votes		6,269	100%

116th district general election
Party	Candidate	Votes	%
Democratic	El-Mahdi Holly (incumbent)	23,762	81.6%
Republican	Reign Stevens	5,346	18.4%
Total votes		29,108	100%
Democratic hold			

=== District 117 ===
1st term incumbent Republican Lauren Daniel had represented the district since 2023.

117th district Democratic primary
Party	Candidate	Votes	%
Democratic	Mary Ann Santos	3,491	100%
Total votes		3,491	100%

117th district general election
Party	Candidate	Votes	%
Democratic	Mary Ann Santos	24,820	100%
Total votes		24,820	100%
Democratic hold			

=== District 118 ===
1st term incumbent Republican Clint Crowe had represented the district since 2023.

118th district Republican primary
Party	Candidate	Votes	%
Republican	Clint Crowe (incumbent)	4,210	100%
Total votes		4,210	100%

118th district Democratic primary
Party	Candidate	Votes	%
Democratic	Sharonda Bell	2,371	100%
Total votes		2,371	100%

118th district general election
Party	Candidate	Votes	%
Republican	Clint Crowe (incumbent)	21,450	66.8%
Democratic	Sharonda Bell	10,671	33.2%
Total votes		32,121	100%
Republican hold			

=== District 119 ===
1st term incumbent Republican Holt Persinger had represented the district since 2023.

119th district Republican primary
Party	Candidate	Votes	%
Republican	Holt Persinger (incumbent)	3,626	100%
Total votes		3,626	100%

119th district general election
Party	Candidate	Votes	%
Republican	Holt Persinger (incumbent)	26,957	100%
Total votes		26,957	100%
Republican hold			

=== District 120 ===
3rd term incumbent Republican Houston Gaines had represented the district since 2019.

120th district Republican primary
Party	Candidate	Votes	%
Republican	Houston Gaines (incumbent)	4,568	100%
Total votes		4,568	100%

120th district Democratic primary
Party	Candidate	Votes	%
Democratic	Andrew Ferguson	2,632	100%
Total votes		2,632	100%

120th district general election
Party	Candidate	Votes	%
Republican	Houston Gaines (incumbent)	19,248	61.3%
Democratic	Andrew Ferguson	12,156	38.7%
Total votes		31,404	100%
Republican hold			

=== District 121 ===
3rd term incumbent Republican Marcus Wiedower had represented the district since 2019.

121st district Republican primary
Party	Candidate	Votes	%
Republican	Marcus Wiedower (incumbent)	4,516	83.1%
Republican	John Michael Grigsby	917	16.9%
Total votes		5,433	100%

121st district Democratic primary
Party	Candidate	Votes	%
Democratic	Courtney Frisch	2,724	100%
Total votes		2,724	100%

121st district general election
Party	Candidate	Votes	%
Republican	Marcus Wiedower (incumbent)	19,764	61.1%
Democratic	Eric Martin Gisler	12,567	38.9%
Total votes		32,331	100%
Republican hold			

=== District 122 ===
1st term incumbent Democratic Spencer Frye had represented the district since 2023.

122nd district Democratic primary
Party	Candidate	Votes	%
Democratic	Spencer Frye (incumbent)	3,294	100%
Total votes		3,294	100%

122nd district general election
Party	Candidate	Votes	%
Democratic	Spencer Frye (incumbent)	17,410	100%
Total votes		17,410	100%
Democratic hold			

=== District 123 ===
1st term incumbent Republican Rob Leverett had represented the district since 2023.

123rd district Republican primary
Party	Candidate	Votes	%
Republican	Rob Leverett (incumbent)	5,316	100%
Total votes		5,316	100%

123rd district Democratic primary
Party	Candidate	Votes	%
Democratic	Hope S. Beard	2,989	100%
Total votes		2,989	100%

123rd district general election
Party	Candidate	Votes	%
Republican	Rob Leverett (incumbent)	22,874	73.2%
Democratic	Hope S. Beard	8,367	26.8%
Total votes		31,241	100%
Republican hold			

=== District 124 ===
5th term incumbent Republican Trey Rhodes had represented the district since 2015.

124th district Republican primary
Party	Candidate	Votes	%
Republican	Trey Rhodes (incumbent)	8,015	100%
Total votes		8,015	100%

124th district Democratic primary
Party	Candidate	Votes	%
Democratic	Melanie M. Miller	1,963	82.0%
Democratic	Rickie Glenn	432	18.0%
Total votes		2,395	100%

124th district general election
Party	Candidate	Votes	%
Republican	Trey Rhodes (incumbent)	22,862	65.7%
Democratic	Melanie M. Miller	11,913	34.3%
Total votes		34,775	100%
Republican hold			

=== District 125 ===
6th term incumbent Republican Barry Fleming had represented the district since 2013. He resigned on 9 January 2024.

125th district Republican primary
Party	Candidate	Votes	%
Republican	Gary Richardson (incumbent)	2,951	100%
Total votes		2,951	100%

125th district Democratic primary
Party	Candidate	Votes	%
Democratic	Kay Turner	1,144	100%
Total votes		1,144	100%

125th district general election
Party	Candidate	Votes	%
Republican	Gary Richardson (incumbent)	20,341	64.5%
Democratic	Kay Turner	11,194	35.5%
Total votes		31,535	100%
Republican hold			

=== District 126 ===
9th term incumbent Democratic Gloria Frazier had represented the district since 2007.

126th district Republican primary
Party	Candidate	Votes	%
Republican	William C. Harris	1,778	100%
Total votes		1,778	100%

126th district Democratic primary
Party	Candidate	Votes	%
Democratic	L.C. Myles Jr.	6,016	100%
Total votes		6,016	100%

126th district general election
Party	Candidate	Votes	%
Democratic	L.C. Myles Jr.	15,465	57.9%
Republican	William C. Harris	11,234	42.1%
Total votes		26,699	100%
Democratic hold			

=== District 127 ===
1st term incumbent Republican Mark Newton had represented the district since 2023.

127th district Republican primary
Party	Candidate	Votes	%
Republican	Mark Newton (incumbent)	3,143	100%
Total votes		3,143	100%

127th district general election
Party	Candidate	Votes	%
Republican	Mark Newton (incumbent)	25,538	100%
Total votes		25,538	100%
Republican hold			

=== District 128 ===
8th term incumbent Democratic Mack Jackson had represented the district since 2009.

128th district Republican primary
Party	Candidate	Votes	%
Republican	Tracy Wheeler	3,274	100%
Total votes		3,274	100%

128th district Democratic primary
Party	Candidate	Votes	%
Democratic	Mack Jackson (incumbent)	5,633	100%
Total votes		5,633	100%

128th district general election
Party	Candidate	Votes	%
Democratic	Mack Jackson (incumbent)	13,926	50.1%
Republican	Tracy Wheeler	13,878	49.9%
Total votes		27,804	100%
Democratic hold			

=== District 129 ===
1st term incumbent Democratic Karlton Howard had represented the district since 2023.

129th district Democratic primary
Party	Candidate	Votes	%
Democratic	Karlton Howard (incumbent)	3,734	76.5%
Democratic	Scott Cambers	1,148	23.5%
Total votes		4,882	100%

129th district general election
Party	Candidate	Votes	%
Democratic	Karlton Howard (incumbent)	17,008	100%
Total votes		17,008	100%
Democratic hold			

=== District 130 ===
1st term incumbent Democratic Lynn Gladney had represented the district since 2023.

130th district Democratic primary
Party	Candidate	Votes	%
Democratic	Lynn Gladney (incumbent)	5,066	100%
Total votes		5,066	100%

130th district general election
Party	Candidate	Votes	%
Democratic	Lynn Gladney (incumbent)	18,775	100%
Total votes		18,775	100%
Democratic hold			

=== District 131 ===
1st term incumbent Republican Jodi Lott had represented the district since 2023.

131st district Republican primary
Party	Candidate	Votes	%
Republican	Rob Clifton	1,887	48.8%
Republican	Paul Abbott	728	18.8%
Republican	Russell A. Wilder	674	17.4%
Republican	Benjamin Shawn Cairns	333	8.6%
Republican	David Christian Byrne	247	6.4%
Total votes		3,869	100%

131st district Republican primary runoff
Party	Candidate	Votes	%
Republican	Rob Clifton	1,561	73.3%
Republican	Paul Abbott	569	26.7%
Total votes		2,130	100%

131st district Democratic primary
Party	Candidate	Votes	%
Democratic	Heather Rose White	1,266	100%
Total votes		1,266	100%

131st district general election
Party	Candidate	Votes	%
Republican	Rob Clifton	21,351	65.1%
Democratic	Heather Rose White	11,466	34.9%
Total votes		32,817	100%
Republican hold			

=== District 132 ===
1st term incumbent Democratic Brian Prince had represented the district since 2023.

132nd district Democratic primary
Party	Candidate	Votes	%
Democratic	Brian Prince (incumbent)	6,488	100%
Total votes		6,488	100%

132nd district general election
Party	Candidate	Votes	%
Democratic	Brian Prince (incumbent)	19,198	100%
Total votes		19,198	100%
Democratic hold			

=== District 133 ===
1st term incumbent Republican Kenneth Vance had represented the district since 2023

133rd district Republican primary
Party	Candidate	Votes	%
Republican	Danny Mathis (incumbent)	5,455	100%
Total votes		5,455	100%

133rd district general election
Party	Candidate	Votes	%
Republican	Danny Mathis (incumbent)	21,374	100%
Total votes		21,374	100%
Republican hold			

=== District 134 ===
10th term incumbent Republican David Knight had represented the district since 2005.

134th district Republican primary
Party	Candidate	Votes	%
Republican	Robert Dickey (incumbent)	5,126	83.8%
Republican	Joshua Lewis	991	16.2%
Total votes		6,117	100%

134th district general election
Party	Candidate	Votes	%
Republican	Robert Dickey (incumbent)	25,043	100%
Total votes		25,043	100%
Republican hold			

=== District 135 ===
2nd term incumbent Republican Beth Camp had represented the district since 2021.

135th district Republican primary
Party	Candidate	Votes	%
Republican	Beth Camp (incumbent)	6,888	100%
Total votes		6,888	100%

135th district general election
Party	Candidate	Votes	%
Republican	Beth Camp (incumbent)	28,632	100%
Total votes		28,632	100%
Republican hold			

=== District 136 ===
2nd term incumbent Republican David Jenkins had represented the district since 2021.

136th district Republican primary
Party	Candidate	Votes	%
Republican	David Jenkins (incumbent)	3,412	64.9%
Republican	Michael J. Riesen	1,845	35.1%
Total votes		5,257	100%

136th district Democratic primary
Party	Candidate	Votes	%
Democratic	Jeff Lowe	1,589	100%
Total votes		1,589	100%

136th district general election
Party	Candidate	Votes	%
Republican	David Jenkins (incumbent)	22,527	68.5%
Democratic	Jeff Lowe	10,383	31.6%
Total votes		32,910	100%
Republican hold			

=== District 137 ===
11th term incumbent Democratic Debbie Buckner had represented the district since 2003.

137th district Republican primary
Party	Candidate	Votes	%
Republican	Stephen Acorn	2,552	100%
Total votes		2,552	100%

137th district Democratic primary
Party	Candidate	Votes	%
Democratic	Debbie Buckner (incumbent)	3,324	79.5%
Democratic	Carlton Mahone Sr.	858	20.5%
Total votes		4,182	100%

137th district general election
Party	Candidate	Votes	%
Democratic	Debbie Buckner (incumbent)	16,108	59.7%
Republican	Stephen Acorn	10,884	40.3%
Total votes		26,992	100%
Democratic hold			

=== District 138 ===
3rd term incumbent Republican Vance Smith had represented the district since 2019.

138th district Republican primary
Party	Candidate	Votes	%
Republican	Vance Smith (incumbent)	6,223	100%
Total votes		6,223	100%

138th district general election
Party	Candidate	Votes	%
Republican	Vance Smith (incumbent)	28,129	100%
Total votes		28,129	100%
Republican hold			

=== District 139 ===
10th term incumbent Republican Richard H. Smith had represented the district since 2005.

139th district Republican primary
Party	Candidate	Votes	%
Republican	Carmen Rice (incumbent)	2,204	56.8%
Republican	Sean Knox	1,679	43.2%
Total votes		3,883	100%

139th district Democratic primary
Party	Candidate	Votes	%
Democratic	Carl Sprayberry	1,804	100%
Total votes		1,804	100%

139th district general election
Party	Candidate	Votes	%
Republican	Carmen Rice (incumbent)	19,069	64.1%
Democratic	Carl Sprayberry	10,665	35.9%
Total votes		29,734	100%
Republican hold			

=== District 140 ===
1st term incumbent Democratic Tremaine Teddy Reese had represented the district since 2023.

140th district Democratic primary
Party	Candidate	Votes	%
Democratic	Tremaine Teddy Reese (incumbent)	1,766	83.5%
Democratic	Alyssa Nia Williams	350	16.5%
Total votes		2,116	100%

140th district general election
Party	Candidate	Votes	%
Democratic	Tremaine Teddy Reese (incumbent)	12,939	100%
Total votes		12,939	100%
Democratic hold			

=== District 141 ===
16th term incumbent Democratic Carolyn Hugley had represented the district since 1993.

141st district Democratic primary
Party	Candidate	Votes	%
Democratic	Carolyn Hugley (incumbent)	3,790	100%
Total votes		3,790	100%

141st district general election
Party	Candidate	Votes	%
Democratic	Carolyn Hugley (incumbent)	18,479	100%
Total votes		18,479	100%
Democratic hold			

=== District 142 ===
4th term incumbent Democratic Miriam Paris had represented the district since 2017.

142nd district Republican primary
Party	Candidate	Votes	%
Republican	Calvin Dennis Palmer	1,511	100%
Total votes		1,511	100%

142nd district Democratic primary
Party	Candidate	Votes	%
Democratic	Miriam Paris (incumbent)	4,777	100%
Total votes		4,777	100%

142nd district general election
Party	Candidate	Votes	%
Democratic	Miriam Paris (incumbent)	15,936	60.5%
Republican	Calvin Dennis Palmer	10,391	39.5%
Total votes		26,327	100%
Democratic hold			

=== District 143 ===
7th term incumbent Democratic James Beverly had represented the district since 2011.

143rd district Republican primary
Party	Candidate	Votes	%
Republican	Barbara Boyer	1,502	100%
Total votes		1,502	100%

143rd district Democratic primary
Party	Candidate	Votes	%
Democratic	Anissa Jones	3,077	100%
Total votes		3,077	100%

143rd district general election
Party	Candidate	Votes	%
Democratic	Anissa Jones	13,318	61.9%
Republican	Barbara Boyer	8,196	38.1%
Total votes		21,514	100%
Democratic hold			

=== District 144 ===
3rd term incumbent Republican Dale Washburn had represented the district since 2019.

144th district Republican primary
Party	Candidate	Votes	%
Republican	Dale Washburn (incumbent)	4,777	100%
Total votes		4,777	100%

144th district Democratic primary
Party	Candidate	Votes	%
Democratic	Anita Hyland	1,756	100%
Total votes		1,756	100%

144th district general election
Party	Candidate	Votes	%
Republican	Dale Washburn (incumbent)	25,400	74.5%
Democratic	Anita Hyland	8,714	25.5%
Total votes		34,114	100%
Republican hold			

=== District 145 ===
7th term incumbent Republican Robert Dickey had represented the district since 2011.

145th district Republican primary
Party	Candidate	Votes	%
Republican	Noah Redding Harbuck	2,065	58.6%
Republican	De'Ron Rogers	999	28.4%
Republican	Nancy Hicks	458	13.0%
Total votes		3,522	100%

145th district Democratic primary
Party	Candidate	Votes	%
Democratic	Juawn Jackson	1,815	43.4%
Democratic	Tangie Herring	1,771	42.3%
Democratic	Donald L. Druitt Sr.	597	14.3%
Total votes		4,183	100%

145th district Democratic primary runoff
Party	Candidate	Votes	%
Democratic	Tangie Herring	1,265	57.6%
Democratic	Juawn Jackson	930	42.4%
Total votes		2,195	100%

145th district general election
Party	Candidate	Votes	%
Democratic	Tangie Herring	13,652	50.5%
Republican	Noah Redding Harbuck	13,379	49.5%
Total votes		27,031	100%
Democratic gain from Republican			

=== District 146 ===
5th term incumbent Republican Shaw Blackmon had represented the district since 2015.

146th district Republican primary
Party	Candidate	Votes	%
Republican	Shaw Blackmon (incumbent)	5,232	100%
Total votes		5,232	100%

146th district general election
Party	Candidate	Votes	%
Republican	Shaw Blackmon (incumbent)	27,658	100%
Total votes		27,658	100%
Republican hold			

=== District 147 ===
1st term incumbent Republican Bethany Ballard had represented the district since 2023.

147th district Republican primary
Party	Candidate	Votes	%
Republican	Bethany Ballard (incumbent)	3,228	100%
Total votes		3,228	100%

147th district Democratic primary
Party	Candidate	Votes	%
Democratic	Ariel Phillips	1,788	100%
Total votes		1,788	100%

147th district general election
Party	Candidate	Votes	%
Republican	Bethany Ballard (incumbent)	16,278	56.9%
Democratic	Ariel Phillips	12,318	43.1%
Total votes		28,596	100%
Republican hold			

=== District 148 ===
3rd term incumbent Republican Noel Williams Jr. had represented the district since 2019.

148th district Republican primary
Party	Candidate	Votes	%
Republican	Noel Williams Jr. (incumbent)	6,782	100%
Total votes		6,782	100%

148th district general election
Party	Candidate	Votes	%
Republican	Noel Williams Jr. (incumbent)	22,686	100%
Total votes		22,686	100%
Republican hold			

=== District 149 ===
7th term incumbent Republican Danny Mathis had represented the district since 2011.

149th district Republican primary
Party	Candidate	Votes	%
Republican	Kenneth Vance (incumbent)	2,416	100%
Total votes		2,416	100%

149th district Democratic primary
Party	Candidate	Votes	%
Democratic	Floyd Griffin	2,535	69.3%
Democratic	Phyllis Tufts Hightower	1,121	30.7%
Total votes		3,656	100%

149th district general election
Party	Candidate	Votes	%
Democratic	Floyd Griffin	13,002	54.0%
Republican	Kenneth Vance (incumbent)	11,078	46.0%
Total votes		24,080	100%
Democratic gain from Republican			

=== District 150 ===
6th term incumbent Democratic Patty Bentley had represented the district since 2013.

150th district Republican primary
Party	Candidate	Votes	%
Republican	Cary Moore	2,266	100%
Total votes		2,266	100%

150th district Democratic primary
Party	Candidate	Votes	%
Democratic	Patty Marie Stinson (incumbent)	3,802	100%
Total votes		3,802	100%

150th district general election
Party	Candidate	Votes	%
Democratic	Patty Marie Stinson (incumbent)	11,892	53.2%
Republican	Cary Moore	10,443	46.8%
Total votes		22,335	100%
Democratic hold			

=== District 151 ===
1st term incumbent Republican Mike Cheokas had represented the district since 2023.

151st district Republican primary
Party	Candidate	Votes	%
Republican	Mike Cheokas (incumbent)	2,891	100%
Total votes		2,891	100%

151st district general election
Party	Candidate	Votes	%
Republican	Mike Cheokas (incumbent)	18,992	100%
Total votes		18,992	100%
Republican hold			

=== District 152 ===
3rd term incumbent Republican Bill Yearta had represented the district since 2019.

152nd district Republican primary
Party	Candidate	Votes	%
Republican	Bill Yearta (incumbent)	5,774	100%
Total votes		5,774	100%

152nd district general election
Party	Candidate	Votes	%
Republican	Bill Yearta (incumbent)	25,258	100%
Total votes		25,258	100%
Republican hold			

=== District 153 ===
1st term incumbent Democratic David Sampson had represented the district since 2023.

153rd district Republican primary
Party	Candidate	Votes	%
Republican	Brenda Battle	860	100%
Total votes		860	100%

153rd district Democratic primary
Party	Candidate	Votes	%
Democratic	David Sampson (incumbent)	2,644	57.9%
Democratic	Joshua Anthony	982	21.5%
Democratic	Tracy Taylor	943	20.6%
Total votes		4,569	100%

153rd district general election
Party	Candidate	Votes	%
Democratic	David Sampson (incumbent)	14,014	67.1%
Republican	Brenda Battle	6,875	32.9%
Total votes		20,889	100%
Democratic hold			

=== District 154 ===
21st term incumbent Republican Gerald Greene had represented the district since 1983.

154th district Republican primary
Party	Candidate	Votes	%
Republican	Gerald Greene (incumbent)	3,185	100%
Total votes		3,185	100%

154th district general election
Party	Candidate	Votes	%
Republican	Gerald Greene (incumbent)	20,680	100%
Total votes		20,680	100%
Republican hold			

=== District 155 ===
1st term incumbent Republican Matt Hatchett had represented the district since 2023.

155th district Republican primary
Party	Candidate	Votes	%
Republican	Matt Hatchett (incumbent)	7,509	100%
Total votes		7,509	100%

155th district general election
Party	Candidate	Votes	%
Republican	Matt Hatchett (incumbent)	22,913	100%
Total votes		22,913	100%
Republican hold			

=== District 156 ===
2nd term incumbent Republican Leesa Hagan had represented the district since 2021.

156th district Republican primary
Party	Candidate	Votes	%
Republican	Leesa Hagan (incumbent)	6,494	100%
Total votes		6,494	100%

156th district general election
Party	Candidate	Votes	%
Republican	Leesa Hagan (incumbent)	19,606	100%
Total votes		19,606	100%
Republican hold			

=== District 157 ===
5th term incumbent Republican Bill Werkheiser had represented the district since 2015.

157th district Republican primary
Party	Candidate	Votes	%
Republican	Bill Werkheiser (incumbent)	6,030	100%
Total votes		6,030	100%

157th district general election
Party	Candidate	Votes	%
Republican	Bill Werkheiser (incumbent)	19,664	100%
Total votes		19,664	100%
Republican hold			

=== District 158 ===
20th term incumbent Republican Butch Parrish had represented the district since 1985.

158th district Republican primary
Party	Candidate	Votes	%
Republican	Butch Parrish (incumbent)	4,795	100%
Total votes		4,795	100%

158th district Democratic primary
Party	Candidate	Votes	%
Democratic	Madeline Ryan Smith	1,239	100%
Total votes		1,239	100%

158th district general election
Party	Candidate	Votes	%
Republican	Butch Parrish (incumbent)	18,048	72.9%
Democratic	Madeline Ryan Smith	6,711	27.1%
Total votes		24,759	100%
Republican hold			

=== District 159 ===
10th term incumbent Republican Jon G. Burns had represented the district since 2005.

159th district Republican primary
Party	Candidate	Votes	%
Republican	Jon G. Burns (incumbent)	6,798	100%
Total votes		6,798	100%

159th district general election
Party	Candidate	Votes	%
Republican	Jon G. Burns (incumbent)	26,319	100%
Total votes		26,319	100%
Republican hold			

=== District 160 ===
1st term incumbent Republican Lehman Franklin had represented the district since 2023.

160th district Republican primary
Party	Candidate	Votes	%
Republican	Lehman Franklin (incumbent)	4,555	100%
Total votes		4,555	100%

160th district general election
Party	Candidate	Votes	%
Republican	Lehman Franklin (incumbent)	19,745	100%
Total votes		19,745	100%
Republican hold			

=== District 161 ===
6th term incumbent Republican Bill Hitchens had represented the district since 2013.

161st district Republican primary
Party	Candidate	Votes	%
Republican	Bill Hitchens (incumbent)	2,688	100%
Total votes		2,688	100%

161st district general election
Party	Candidate	Votes	%
Republican	Bill Hitchens (incumbent)	23,751	100%
Total votes		23,751	100%
Republican hold			

=== District 162 ===
5th term incumbent Democratic Carl Gilliard had represented the district since 2016.

162nd district Republican primary
Party	Candidate	Votes	%
Republican	Keith Padgett	782	80.0%
Republican	Tami Williams	196	20.0%
Total votes		978	100%

162nd district Democratic primary
Party	Candidate	Votes	%
Democratic	Carl Gilliard (incumbent)	3,115	100%
Total votes		3,115	100%

162nd district general election
Party	Candidate	Votes	%
Democratic	Carl Gilliard (incumbent)	16,033	66.2%
Republican	Keith Padgett	8,186	33.8%
Total votes		24,219	100%
Democratic hold			

=== District 163 ===
1st term incumbent Democratic Anne Allen Westbrook had represented the district since 2023.

163rd district Democratic primary
Party	Candidate	Votes	%
Democratic	Anne Allen Westbrook (incumbent)	4,039	100%
Total votes		4,039	100%

163rd district general election
Party	Candidate	Votes	%
Democratic	Anne Allen Westbrook (incumbent)	20,697	100%
Total votes		20,697	100%
Democratic hold			

=== District 164 ===
14th term incumbent Republican Ron Stephens had represented the district since 1997.

164th district Republican primary
Party	Candidate	Votes	%
Republican	Ron Stephens (incumbent)	2,853	100%
Total votes		2,853	100%

164th district general election
Party	Candidate	Votes	%
Republican	Ron Stephens (incumbent)	24,073	100%
Total votes		24,073	100%
Republican hold			

=== District 165 ===
2nd term incumbent Democratic Edna Jackson had represented the district since 2021.

165th district Democratic primary
Party	Candidate	Votes	%
Democratic	Edna Jackson (incumbent)	4,409	100%
Total votes		4,409	100%

165th district general election
Party	Candidate	Votes	%
Democratic	Edna Jackson (incumbent)	21,840	100%
Total votes		21,840	100%
Democratic hold			

=== District 166 ===
5th term incumbent Republican Jesse Petrea had represented the district since 2015.

166th district Republican primary
Party	Candidate	Votes	%
Republican	Jesse Petrea (incumbent)	7,285	100%
Total votes		7,285	100%

166th district Democratic primary
Party	Candidate	Votes	%
Democratic	Gay Fortson	2,094	100%
Total votes		2,094	100%

166th district general election
Party	Candidate	Votes	%
Republican	Jesse Petrea (incumbent)	28,416	71.7%
Democratic	Gay Fortson	11,237	28.3%
Total votes		39,653	100%
Republican hold			

=== District 167 ===
2nd term incumbent Republican Buddy DeLoach had represented the district since 2021.

167th district Republican primary
Party	Candidate	Votes	%
Republican	Buddy DeLoach (incumbent)	5,025	100%
Total votes		5,025	100%

167th district Democratic primary
Party	Candidate	Votes	%
Democratic	Rebekah Moore	1,614	100%
Total votes		1,614	100%

167th district general election
Party	Candidate	Votes	%
Republican	Buddy DeLoach (incumbent)	20,080	70.6%
Democratic	Rebekah Moore	8,375	29.4%
Total votes		28,455	100%
Republican hold			

=== District 168 ===
11th term incumbent Democratic Al Williams had represented the district since 2003.

168th district Democratic primary
Party	Candidate	Votes	%
Democratic	Al Williams (incumbent)	3,911	78.0%
Democratic	Henry L. Covington	1,103	22.0%
Total votes		5,014	100%

168th district general election
Party	Candidate	Votes	%
Democratic	Al Williams (incumbent)	18,106	100%
Total votes		18,106	100%
Democratic hold			

=== District 169 ===
1st term incumbent Republican Clay Pirkle had represented the district since 2023.

169th district Republican primary
Party	Candidate	Votes	%
Republican	Angie O'Steen	5,070	70.2%
Republican	William E. Roberts	2,152	29.8%
Total votes		7,222	100%

169th district Democratic primary
Party	Candidate	Votes	%
Democratic	Theresa R. Rewis	1,406	100%
Total votes		1,406	100%

169th district general election
Party	Candidate	Votes	%
Republican	Angie O'Steen	17,166	74.8%
Democratic	Theresa R. Rewis	5,799	25.2%
Total votes		22,965	100%
Republican hold			

=== District 170 ===
14th term incumbent Republican Penny Houston had represented the district since 1997.

170th district Republican primary
Party	Candidate	Votes	%
Republican	Jaclyn Dixon Ford	3,498	81.0%
Republican	Donny Roberson	821	19.0%
Total votes		4,319	100%

170th district general election
Party	Candidate	Votes	%
Republican	Jaclyn Dixon Ford	20,743	100%
Total votes		20,743	100%
Republican hold			

=== District 171 ===
3rd term incumbent Republican Joe Campbell had represented the district since 2020.

171st district Republican primary
Party	Candidate	Votes	%
Republican	Joe Campbell (incumbent)	3,187	75.0%
Republican	Crosby Steen	1,065	25.0%
Total votes		4,252	100%

171st district general election
Party	Candidate	Votes	%
Republican	Joe Campbell (incumbent)	19,633	100%
Total votes		19,633	100%
Republican hold			

=== District 172 ===
1st term incumbent Republican Charles Cannon had represented the district since 2023.

172nd district Republican primary
Party	Candidate	Votes	%
Republican	Charles Cannon (incumbent)	3,909	100%
Total votes		3,909	100%

172nd district general election
Party	Candidate	Votes	%
Republican	Charles Cannon (incumbent)	19,258	100%
Total votes		19,258	100%
Republican hold			

=== District 173 ===
7th term incumbent Republican Darlene Taylor had represented the district since 2011.

173rd district Republican primary
Party	Candidate	Votes	%
Republican	Darlene Taylor (incumbent)	5,529	100%
Total votes		5,529	100%

173rd district Democratic primary
Party	Candidate	Votes	%
Democratic	Theresa Thomas	2,081	100%
Total votes		2,081	100%

173rd district general election
Party	Candidate	Votes	%
Republican	Darlene Taylor (incumbent)	17,033	65.5%
Democratic	Theresa Thomas	8,984	34.5%
Total votes		26,017	100%
Republican hold			

=== District 174 ===
5th term incumbent Republican John Corbett had represented the district since 2015.

174th district Republican primary
Party	Candidate	Votes	%
Republican	John Corbett (incumbent)	6,238	100%
Total votes		6,238	100%

174th district general election
Party	Candidate	Votes	%
Republican	John Corbett (incumbent)	22,251	100%
Total votes		22,251	100%
Republican hold			

=== District 175 ===
4th term incumbent Republican John LaHood had represented the district since 2018.

175th district Republican primary
Party	Candidate	Votes	%
Republican	John LaHood (incumbent)	4,172	100%
Total votes		4,172	100%

175th district Democratic primary
Party	Candidate	Votes	%
Democratic	Anissa Knight Wiseman	1,394	100%
Total votes		1,394	100%

175th district general election
Party	Candidate	Votes	%
Republican	John LaHood (incumbent)	20,695	72.0%
Democratic	Anissa Knight Wiseman	8,070	28.0%
Total votes		28,765	100%
Republican hold			

=== District 176 ===
3rd term incumbent Republican James Burchett had represented the district since 2019.

176th district Republican primary
Party	Candidate	Votes	%
Republican	James Burchett (incumbent)	5,064	100%
Total votes		5,064	100%

176th district general election
Party	Candidate	Votes	%
Republican	James Burchett (incumbent)	19,364	100%
Total votes		19,364	100%
Republican hold			

=== District 177 ===
6th term incumbent Democratic Dexter Sharper had represented the district since 2013.

177th district Republican primary
Party	Candidate	Votes	%
Republican	Clay Griner	1,555	100%
Total votes		1,555	100%

177th district Democratic primary
Party	Candidate	Votes	%
Democratic	Dexter Sharper (incumbent)	1,823	100%
Total votes		1,823	100%

177th district general election
Party	Candidate	Votes	%
Democratic	Dexter Sharper (incumbent)	11,400	62.1%
Republican	Clay Griner	6,954	37.9%
Total votes		18,354	100%
Democratic hold			

=== District 178 ===
3rd term incumbent Republican Steven Meeks had represented the district since 2019.

178th district Republican primary
Party	Candidate	Votes	%
Republican	Steven Meeks (incumbent)	8,138	100%
Total votes		8,138	100%

178th district general election
Party	Candidate	Votes	%
Republican	Steven Meeks (incumbent)	24,660	100%
Total votes		24,660	100%
Republican hold			

=== District 179 ===
1st term incumbent Republican Rick Townsend had represented the district since 2023.

179th district Republican primary
Party	Candidate	Votes	%
Republican	Rick Townsend (incumbent)	4,249	100%
Total votes		4,249	100%

179th district general election
Party	Candidate	Votes	%
Republican	Rick Townsend (incumbent)	22,336	100%
Total votes		22,336	100%
Republican hold			

=== District 180 ===
3rd term incumbent Republican Steven Sainz had represented the district since 2019.

180th district Republican primary
Party	Candidate	Votes	%
Republican	Steven Sainz (incumbent)	3,075	49.7%
Republican	Glenn Cook	1,673	27.0%
Republican	David L. Rainer	1,440	23.3%
Total votes		6,188	100%

180th district Republican primary runoff
Party	Candidate	Votes	%
Republican	Steven Sainz (incumbent)	2,294	52.5%
Republican	Glenn Cook	2,077	47.5%
Total votes		4,371	100%

180th district Democratic primary
Party	Candidate	Votes	%
Democratic	Defonsio Daniels	963	100%
Total votes		963	100%

180th district general election
Party	Candidate	Votes	%
Republican	Steven Sainz (incumbent)	19,640	69.4%
Democratic	Defonsio Daniels	8,680	30.6%
Total votes		28,320	100%
Republican hold			

== See also ==
- 2024 Georgia state elections
- 2024 Georgia State Senate election
- List of Georgia state legislatures
