= Tangie Herring =

American politician

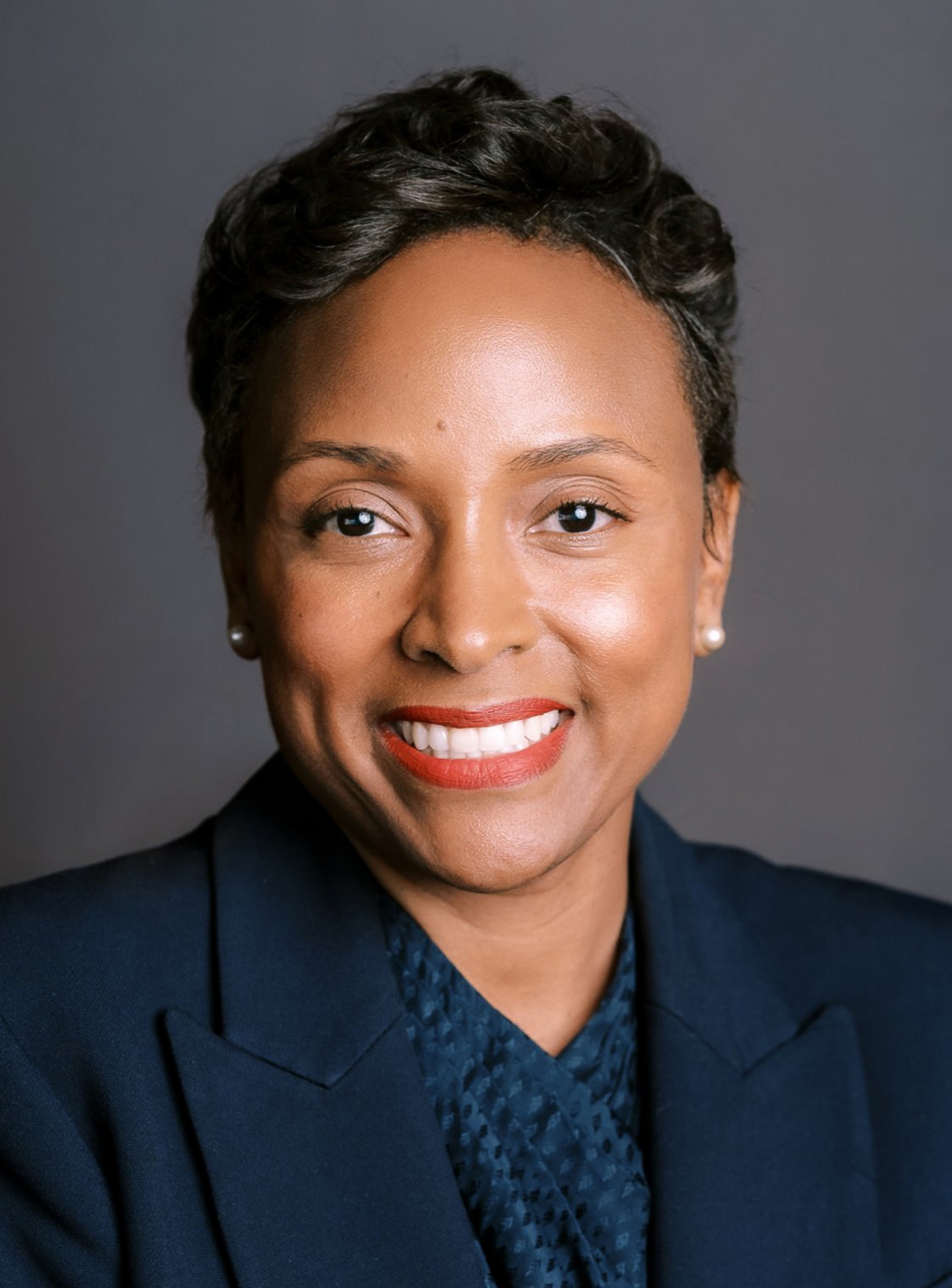

Member of the Georgia House of Representatives from the 145th district
- Incumbent
- Assumed office January 13, 2025
- Preceded by: Robert Dickey

Personal details
- Born: April 27 Macon, Georgia, U.S.
- Party: Democratic
- Spouse: Wallace Herring
- Education: Georgia College (BA)

Tanjaneca Lanese Herring (born April 27) is an American schoolteacher and politician who was elected to the Georgia House of Representatives in House District 145, containing parts of Bibb and Monroe counties, in the 2024 election. She defeated Bibb County Board of Education member Juawn Jackson in the runoff for the Democratic primary and won in the general election against Republican challenger Noah Redding Arbuck, winning by 251 absentee votes. Herring is a former Atlanta Public Schools teacher.

== Political career ==
In 2025, Herring crossed party lines to vote in favor of bills banning transgender female students from participating in girls’ sports at school, striking all references to genders from the state code, and banning gender affirming care for those held in state prisons.

In 2026, Herring helped to advance and pass a bill that would add suicide prevention resources to the back of all 6th through 12th grade student IDs.
