= Chris Luchey =

American politician

Member of the Georgia House of Representatives from the 103rd district
- Member-elect
- Assumed office January 11, 2027
- Preceded by: Soo Hong

Personal details
- Born: Detroit, Michigan
- Party: Democratic
- Website: Official website

Chris Luchey is an American politician who is a member-elect of the Georgia House of Representatives, representing the 103rd district. He was elected to the Georgia House of Representatives, in the general election on November 3, 2026. He was previously a candidate in 2024. He supports term limits.
