= Michelle Kang (politician) =

American politician

Member-elect of the Georgia House of Representatives from the 99th district
- Assuming office January 11, 2027
- Succeeding: Matt Reeves

Personal details
- Born: Incheon, South Korea
- Party: Democratic
- Education: University of Georgia
- Website: Official website

Michelle Kang is a South Korea-born American politician who is a member-elect of the Georgia House of Representatives, representing the 99th district. She was elected to the Georgia House of Representatives, in the general election on November 3, 2026. She was previously a candidate in 2024. She is Korean American. She is a long-term resident of Gwinnett County, Georgia. She worked in community advocacy and nonprofit leadership prior to taking office.
