= Georgia's 128th House of Representatives district =

State district in Georgia, USA

Georgia's 128th State House of Representatives district
Representative
Mack Jackson; D–Sandersville
- Demographics: 40.7% White; 56.3% Black; 1.7% Hispanic; 0.3% Asian
- Population: 51,724

District 128 elects one member of the Georgia House of Representatives. It contains the entirety of Glascock County, Hancock County, Warren County and Washington County, as well as parts of Baldwin County and McDuffie County.

== Members ==
- Mack Jackson (since 2013)
