= Mack Jackson =

American politician (born 1951)

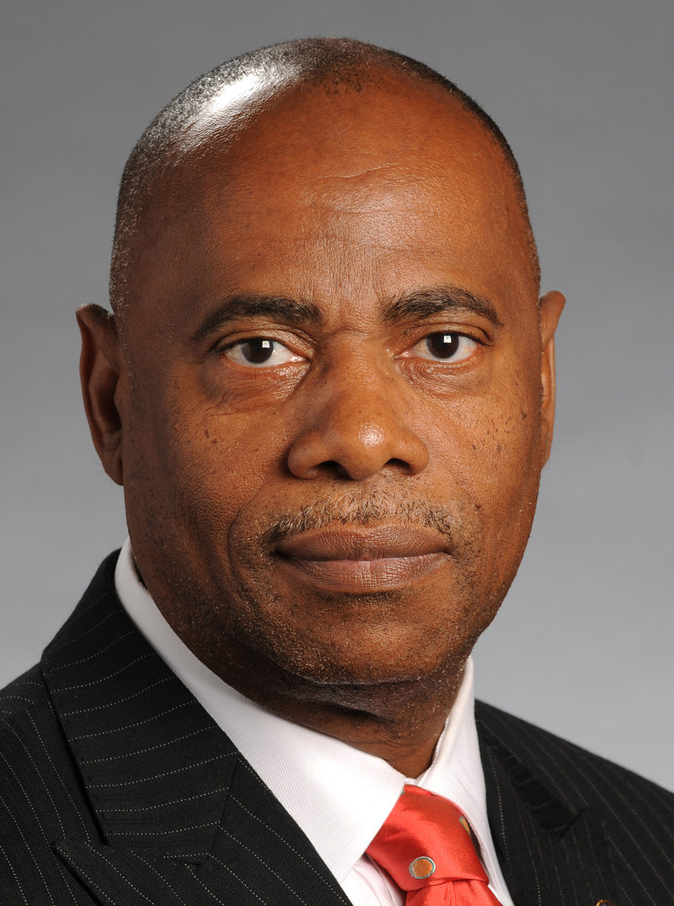

Member of the Georgia House of Representatives from the 128th district
- Incumbent
- Assumed office 2013

Member of the Georgia House of Representatives from the 142nd district
- In office 2009–2013

Personal details
- Born: July 15, 1951 (age 75)
- Party: Democratic
- Spouse: Valarie

Willie Mack Jackson (born July 15, 1951) is an American politician. He is a member of the Georgia House of Representatives, serving since 2009. Jackson has sponsored 158 bills. He is a member of the Democratic party. Jackson announced in March 2026 that he would not seek re- election.

== Political positions ==
=== Abortion ===
Jackson was the only Democrat in the House to vote for Georgia House Bill 481, which prevents physicians from performing abortions after six weeks with limited exceptions.
