= Georgia's 145th House of Representatives district =

State district in Georgia, USA

Georgia's 145th State House of Representatives district
Representative
| Tangie Herring; D–Macon |
- Demographics: 54.2% White; 40.6% Black; 2.4% Hispanic; 1.3% Asian
- Population: 53,819

District 145 elects one member of the Georgia House of Representatives. It contains parts of Bibb County and Monroe County.

== Members ==
- Bobby Parham (until 2009)
- Rusty Kidd (2009–2017)
- Rick Williams (2017–2023)
- Robert Dickey (2023–2025)
- Tangie Herring (since 2025)
