= Eric Bell II =

American politician

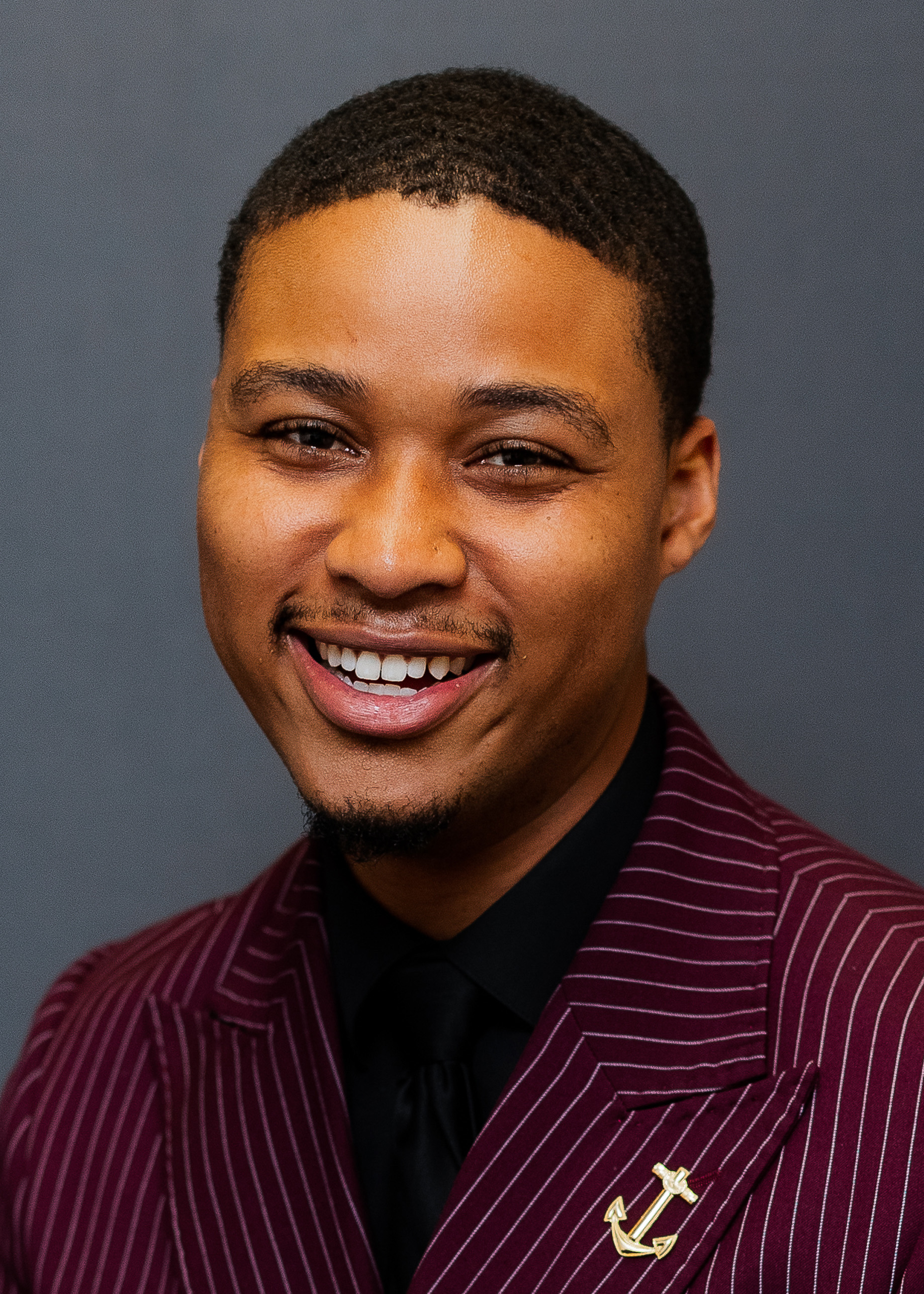

Member of the Georgia House of Representatives from the 75th district
- Incumbent
- Assumed office March 28, 2023
- Succeeded by: Mike Glanton

Personal details
- Party: Democratic

Eric Wyatt Bell II is an American politician from the Democratic Party who serves as a member of the Georgia House of Representatives representing District 75.

In 2023, he was elected to the Georgia House of Representatives in a special election to replace Mike Glanton who resigned. He is a graduate of Morehouse College.

Bell formerly served as a flight officer for the U.S. Navy and worked at Hartsfield–Jackson Atlanta International Airport.
