= 2014 Georgia House of Representatives election =

- November 6, 2014

All 180 seats in the Georgia House of Representatives 91 seats needed for a majority
	Majority party	Minority party	Third party
Party	Republican	Democratic	Independent
Seats before	118	60	1
Seats after	120	59	1
- Results: Democratic; Republican; Independent
Speaker before election
Republican
Elected Speaker
Republican

The 2014 Georgia House of Representatives elections took place on November 6, 2014, as part of the biennial United States elections. The election was held alongside elections for US Senate, US Governor, US House of Representatives and the Georgia State Senate. Georgia voters elected state representatives in all 180 of the state house's districts. State representatives serve two-year terms in the Georgia House of Representatives. The primary elections took place on May 20, 2014, with runoff elections taking place on July 22, 2014.

== Retirements ==
Name	Party	District
Alisha Thomas Morgan	Democratic	District 39
Ed Lindsey	Republican	District 54
Josh Clark	Republican	District 98
Doug Holt	Republican	District 112
Carl Von Epps	Democratic	District 132
Delvis Dutton	Republican	District 157
Ben Watson	Republican	District 166
Jeff Chapman	Republican	District 167
Chuck Sims	Republican	District 169
C. Ellis Black	Republican	District 174

== Summary by district ==
District	Incumbent	Party	Elected	Outcome
1	John Deffenbaugh	Republican	John Deffenbaugh	Republican hold
2	Steve Tarvin	Republican	Steve Tarvin	Republican hold
3				
4				
5				
6				
7				
8				
9				
10				
11				
12				
13				
14				
15				
16				
17				
18				
19				
20				
21				
22				
23				
24				
25				
26				
27				
28				
29				
30				
31				
32				
33				
34				
35				
36				
37				
38				
39				
40				
41				
42				
43				
44				
45				
46				
47				
48				
49				
50				
51				
52				
53				
54				
55				
56				
57				
58				
59				
60				
61				
62				
63				
64				
65				
66				
67				
68				
69				
70				
71				
72				
73				
74				
75				
76				
77				
78				
79				
80				
81				
82				
83				
84				
85				
86				
87				
88				
89				
90				
91				
92				
93				
94				
95				
96				
97				
98				
99				
100				
101				
102				
103				
104				
105				
106				
107				
108				
109				
110				
111				
112				
113				
114				
115				
116				
117				
118				
119				
120				
121				
122				
123				
124				
125				
126				
127				
128				
129				
130				
131				
132				
133				
134				
135				
136				
137				
138				
139				
140				
141				
142				
143				
144				
145				
146				
147				
148				
149				
150				
151				
152				
153				
154				
155				
156				
157				
158				
159				
160				
161				
162				
163				
164				
165				
166				
167				
168				
169				
170				
171				
172				
173				
174				
175				
176				
177				
178				
179				
180				

== See also ==
- List of Georgia state legislatures
