= Winfred Dukes =

American politician (born 1958)

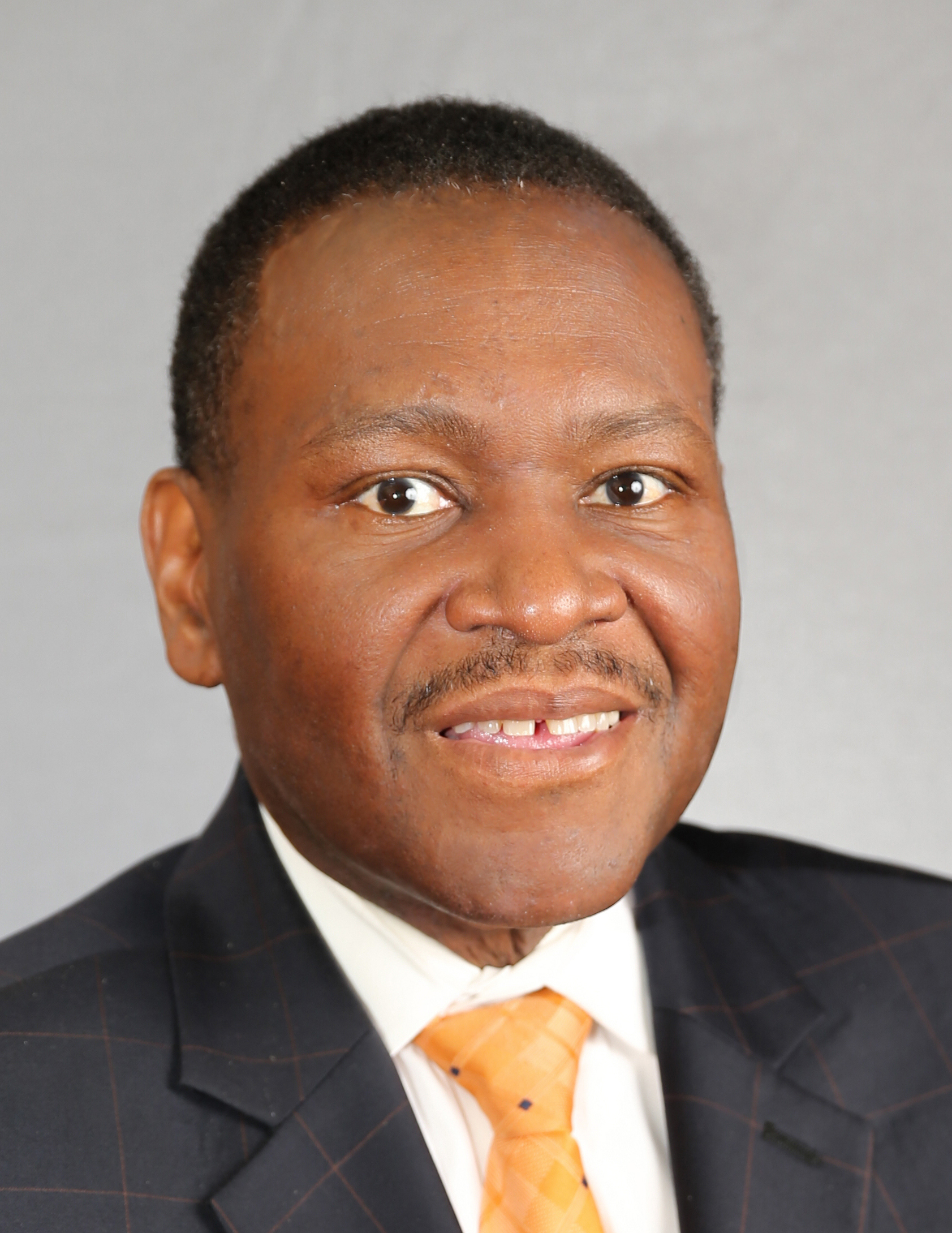

Member of the Georgia House of Representatives
- In office January 13, 1997 – January 9, 2023
- Preceded by: John White
- Succeeded by: Gerald Greene
- Constituency: 161st district (1997–2003); 136th district (2003–2005); 150th district (2005–2013); 154th district (2013–2023)

Personal details
- Born: Winfred Jarrett Dukes; September 20, 1958 (age 67)
- Party: Democratic
- Occupation: Contractor

Winfred Jarrett Dukes (born September 20, 1958) is an American politician from Georgia. Dukes is a former Democratic member of the Georgia House of Representatives.

== Biography ==
Dukes was born and raised in Mitchell County, Georgia, the son of Mrs. Willie Beatrice Dukes and Sylvester Dukes. A product of the public school system, he is a 1974 graduate of Mitchell County High School where he received the General Excellency Award.

He earned a bachelor arts degree in history with a minor in accounting from Mercer University in Macon, Georgia. He also earned a master's degree in Management from Georgia College and State University in Milledgeville, Georgia.

Dukes is chief executive officer of Dukes, Edwards and Dukes, Inc., a family owned construction/real estate firm based in Albany, Georgia. He has received numerous awards and honors for outstanding contributions in business and community service including the Georgia Summit of African-American Business Organizations' Wolf Award and Certificate of Appreciation from the Albany State University Entrepreneurship Project. He received the Omega Psi Phi Citizen of the year Award in 1993, 1997, and 1999. He also received the Georgia State Omega Psi Phi Fraternity Citizen Award for 2000 and the Georgia Rural Health Association Legislator of the Year Award in 2000. Representative Dukes was recognized by the Georgia Municipal Association as a Champion for Georgia's Cities in 2004.

As State Representative of House District 150, which includes Baker and Dougherty Counties, his committee assignments are Economic Development and Tourism, Industrial Relations, and State Planning and Community Affairs. During his first term (1996–1997) he served as whip for the Georgia legislative Black Caucus. Winfred Dukes was elected to serve as second vice chairman of Georgia Democratic Party during the 1998 state Democratic Convention.

Dukes is a member of Omega Psi Phi fraternity, the South Georgia Minority Contractors’ Association, Albany Area Chamber of Commerce, Home Builders Association of Albany, and Southwest Georgia, Albany-Dougherty Chapter of the NAACP, and a Silver Life Member of the NAACP.

He is an active member of the Mt. Zion Missionary Baptist Church in Mitchell County, where he is financial secretary and a member of the Trustee Board.

On March 1, 2022, Dukes announced his candidacy for Agriculture Commissioner of Georgia.

== See also ==
- Democratic Party of Georgia

Georgia House of Representatives
Preceded by John White	Member of the Georgia House of Representatives from the 161st district 1997–2003	Succeeded by Lester Jackson
Preceded by Calvin Smyre	Member of the Georgia House of Representatives from the 136th district 2003–2005	Succeeded by Robert Ray
Preceded by Ron Stephens	Member of the Georgia House of Representatives from the 150th district 2005–2013	Succeeded by Matt Hatchett
Preceded by Jay Roberts	Member of the Georgia House of Representatives from the 154th district 2013–2023	Succeeded by Gerald Greene
