= Carol Fullerton =

American politician

Member of the Georgia House of Representatives from the 151st district
- In office January 12, 2009 – January 14, 2013
- Preceded by: Freddie Sims
- Succeeded by: Gerald Greene

Member of the Georgia House of Representatives from the 153rd district
- In office January 14, 2013 – January 12, 2015
- Preceded by: Tony McBrayer
- Succeeded by: Darrel Ealum

Personal details
- Born: December 16, 1949 (age 76)
- Party: Democratic
- Occupation: Politician

Carol Fullerton (born December 16, 1949) is an American former politician from Georgia. Fullerton was a Democratic member of Georgia House of Representatives from 2009 to 2015.
