= Greg Morris (politician) =

American politician (born 1964)

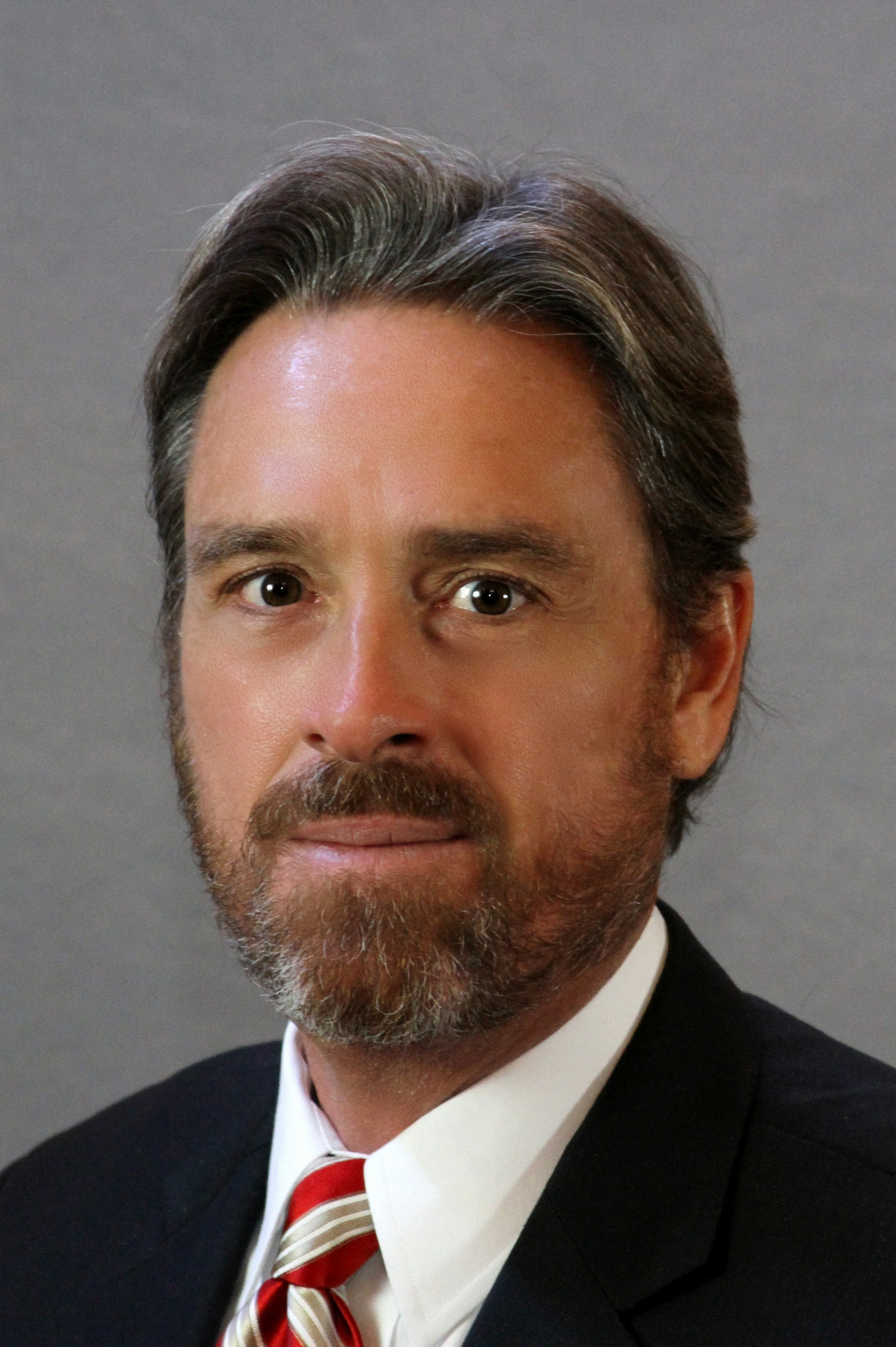

Member of the Toombs County Commission
- In office 1992–1995

Member of the Georgia Senate from the 20th district
- In office January 1995 – January 11, 1999

Member of the Georgia House of Representatives from the 155th district
- In office January 11, 1999 – January 14, 2013
- Preceded by: Fisher Barfoot
- Succeeded by: Jay Roberts

Member of the Georgia House of Representatives from the 156th district
- In office January 14, 2013 – April 13, 2021
- Preceded by: Butch Parrish
- Succeeded by: Leesa Hagan

Personal details
- Born: April 25, 1964 (age 62) Vidalia, Georgia
- Party: Republican (2005-Present)
- Other political affiliations: Democratic (before 2005)
- Occupation: Politician

Greg Morris (born April 25, 1964) is an American politician from Georgia. Morris is a former Democratic member and a former Republican member of Georgia House of Representatives.

== Early life ==
Morris was born on April 25, 1964, in Vidalia, Georgia. Morris attended Robert Toombs Christian Academy.

== Education ==
Morris earned a Bachelor of Arts degree in Political Science from University of Georgia.

== Career ==
=== Toombs County Commission (1992–1995) ===
In 1992, Morris was elected to the Toombs County Commission. He served there until 1995.

=== Georgia State Senate (1995–1999) ===
Morris was elected to the Georgia State Senate from the 20th district in 1994. His term began in January 1995. In 1998 he ran for the state house instead of running for another state senate term. On January 11, 1999, his State Senate term ended.

=== Georgia House of Representatives (1999-Present) ===
Morris was elected to the Georgia House of Representatives from the 155th district in 1998 as a Democrat. His first term began on January 11, 1999. In 2005, he switched from the Democratic Party to the Republican Party.

On November 6, 2012, Morris won the election unopposed and became a Republican member of Georgia House of Representatives from District 156. On November 4, 2014, as an incumbent, Morris won the election unopposed and continued serving District 156. On November 3, 2020, as an incumbent, as an incumbent, Morris won the election unopposed and continued serving District 156.

=== 146th Georgia General Assembly (2001–2002) ===
Morris served on the following committees during the 146th Georgia General Assembly:

- Game, Fish, & Parks
- Transportation Committee

=== 2008 election ===
Morris ran unopposed in both the primary and the general election, winning re-election with 13,462 votes.

2008 Georgia House of Representatives District 155 election
Party	Candidate	Votes	%	±%
Republican	Greg Morris	13,462	100.0	N/A

=== 150th Georgia General Assembly (2009–2010) ===
Morris served on the following committees during the 150th Georgia General Assembly:

- Code Review, Chair
- Natural Resources and Environment, Vice Chair
- Appropriations
- Banks and Banking
- Rules

=== 2010 election ===
Morris ran unopposed in both the primary and the general election, winning re-election with 9,230 votes.

2010 Georgia House of Representatives District 155 election
Party	Candidate	Votes	%	±%
Republican	Greg Morris	9,320	100.0	N/A

=== 151st Georgia General Assembly (2011–2012) ===
Morris served on the following committees during the 151st Georgia General Assembly:

- Banks and Banking, Chair
- Appropriations
- Code Revision
- Natural Resources and Environment
- Rules

=== 2012 election ===
Morris ran unopposed in both the primary and the general election, winning re-election with 14,499 votes. Due to redistricting, Morris now represented the 156th district.

2012 Georgia House of Representatives District 156 election
Party	Candidate	Votes	%	±%
Republican	Greg Morris	14,499	100.0	N/A

=== 152nd Georgia General Assembly (2013–2014) ===
Morris served on the following committees during the 152nd Georgia General Assembly:

- Banks and Banking, Chair
- Appropriations
- Code Revision
- Natural Resources and Environment
- Rules

=== 2014 election ===
==== 2014 primary election ====
Despite having the advantage of incumbency, Morris only won by 1%, facing a tough primary challenge from D.L. “Lee” Burton.

2014 Georgia House of Representatives District 156 primary
Party	Candidate	Votes	%	±%
Republican	Greg Morris	3,361	50.5	N/A
Republican	Lee Burton	3,290	49.5	N/A

=== 153rd Georgia General Assembly (2015–2016) ===
Morris served on the following committees during the 153rd Georgia General Assembly:

- Banks and Banking, Chair
- Code Revision
- Natural Resources and Environment
- Rules

=== 2016 election ===
==== 2016 primary election ====
Morris won again against Lee Burton, this time by 8.7 percent.

2016 Georgia House of Representatives District 156 primary
Party	Candidate	Votes	%	±%
Republican	Greg Morris	5,313	54.35	N/A
Republican	Lee Burton	4,463	45.65	N/A

==== 2016 general election ====
Morris ran unopposed in the 2016 general election, winning with 15,485 votes.

2016 Georgia House of Representatives District 156 election
Party	Candidate	Votes	%	±%
Republican	Greg Morris	15,485	100.0	N/A

=== 154th Georgia General Assembly (2017–2018) ===
Morris served on the following committees during the 154th Georgia General Assembly:

- Banks and Banking, Chair
- Code Revision
- Natural Resources and Environment
- Rules

=== 2018 election ===
==== 2018 primary election ====
Morris faced Lee Burton yet again in the primary, but this time he beat Burton in a landslide, winning by 41 percent.

2016 Georgia House of Representatives District 156 primary
Party	Candidate	Votes	%	±%
Republican	Greg Morris	3,576	70.5	N/A
Republican	Lee Burton	1,495	29.5	N/A

==== 2018 general election ====
Morris ran unopposed in the 2018 election, winning with 15,430 votes.

2018 Georgia House of Representatives District 156 election
Party	Candidate	Votes	%	±%
Republican	Greg Morris	15,430	100.0	N/A

=== 155th Georgia General Assembly (since 2019) ===
Morris served on the following committees during the 155th Georgia General Assembly:

- Banks and Banking, Chair
- Code Revision
- Natural Resources and Environment
- Rules

=== 2020 Election ===
==== 2020 primary election ====
Morris ran unopposed in the 2020 primary, winning with 8,880 votes.

2020 Georgia House of Representatives District 156 primary
Party	Candidate	Votes	%	±%
Republican	Greg Morris	8,880	100.0	N/A

==== 2020 general election ====
Morris ran unopposed in the 2020 election, winning with 19,096 votes.

2020 Georgia House of Representatives District 156 election
Party	Candidate	Votes	%	±%
Republican	Greg Morris	19,096	100.0	N/A

=== Political Positions ===
Morris is generally conservative, with a 70% conservative rating from the American Conservative Union as of 2019. In 2010 he was given a “A” rating by the National Rifle Association Political Victory Fund. Morris has generated controversy for a welfare food stamp drug test bill (Georgia House Bill 772). Morris has also been criticized for breaking with party line and voting for a tax increase.

== Personal life ==
Morris' wife is Amy Morris. They have two children. Morris and his family live in Vidalia, Georgia.

== See also ==
- 146th Georgia General Assembly#Members of the Georgia State House of Representatives, 2001–2002
