= CaMia Hopson =

American politician (born 1969)

CaMia Jackson
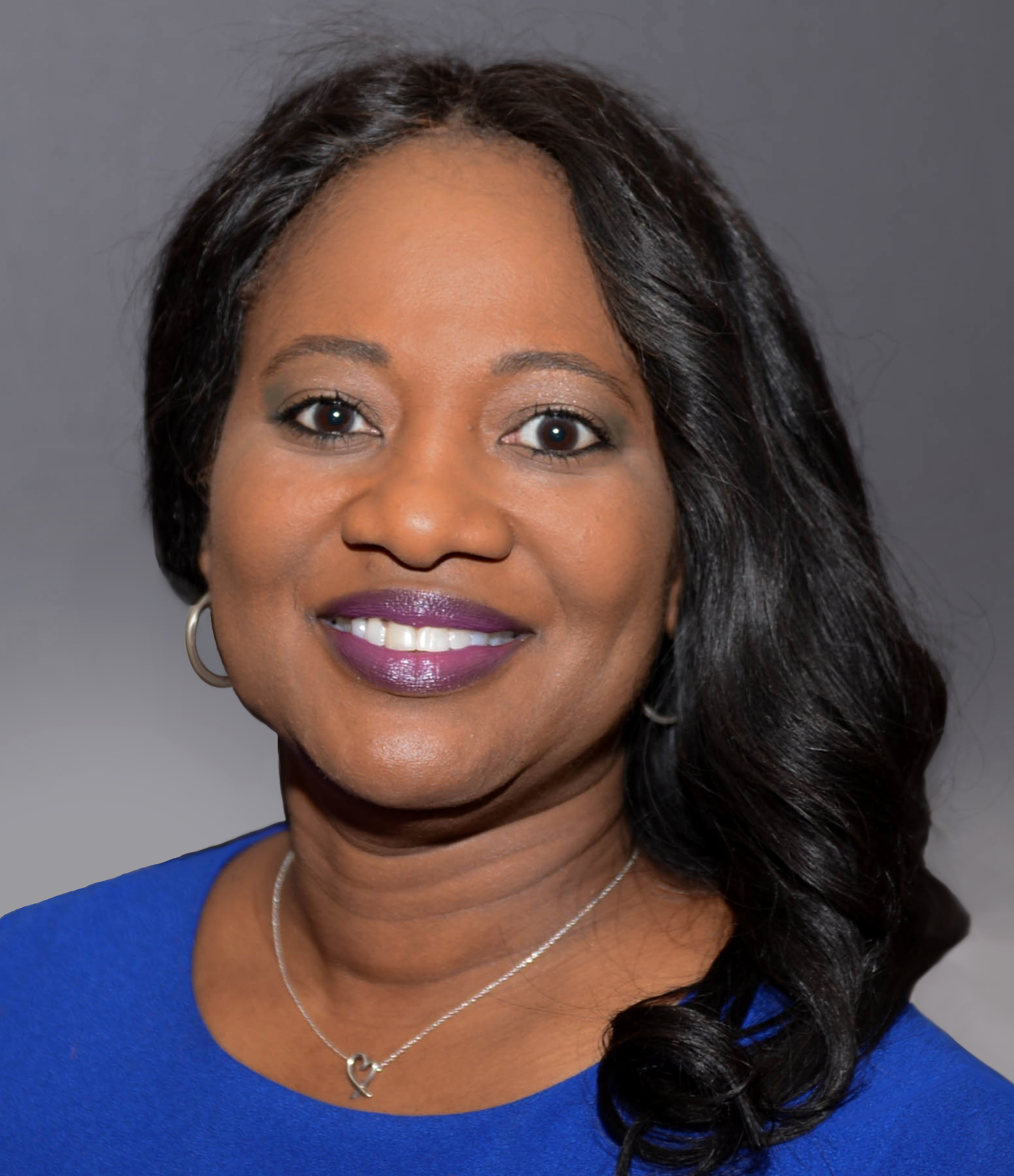

Member of the Georgia House of Representatives from the 153rd district
- In office January 14, 2019 – January 9, 2023
- Preceded by: Darrel Ealum
- Succeeded by: David Sampson

Personal details
- Born: June 19, 1969 (age 57)
- Party: Democratic
- Spouse(s): Granger (m. 1999 - 2009); Derrick Jackson (m. 2021)
- Children: 7
- Education: Albany State University (BS)

CaMia Beryon Jackson (née Hopson; born June 19, 1969) is an American politician who served as a member of the Georgia House of Representatives from the 153rd district from 2019 to 2023.

== Background ==
Prior to entering politics, she worked as a senior computer systems analyst. Hopson earned a Bachelor of Science degree in computer information systems from Albany State University in 1994. She and her husband, Derrick Jackson, have seven children.

Georgia House of Representatives
Preceded by Darrel Ealum	Member of the Georgia House of Representatives from the 153rd district 2019–2023	Succeeded by David Sampson
