= Darrel Ealum =

American politician

Member of the Georgia House of Representatives from the 153rd district
- In office January 12, 2015 – January 14, 2019
- Preceded by: Carol Fullerton
- Succeeded by: CaMia Hopson

Personal details
- Born: December 27, 1948 (age 77) Red Level, Alabama
- Party: Democratic
- Spouse: Linda Ealum
- Occupation: Politician

Darrel Ealum (born December 27, 1948) is an American politician who served in the Georgia House of Representatives from the 153rd district from 2015 to 2019.
