= 2002 Georgia House of Representatives election =

2002 Georgia House of Representatives elections
- November 5, 2002

All 180 seats in the Georgia House of Representatives
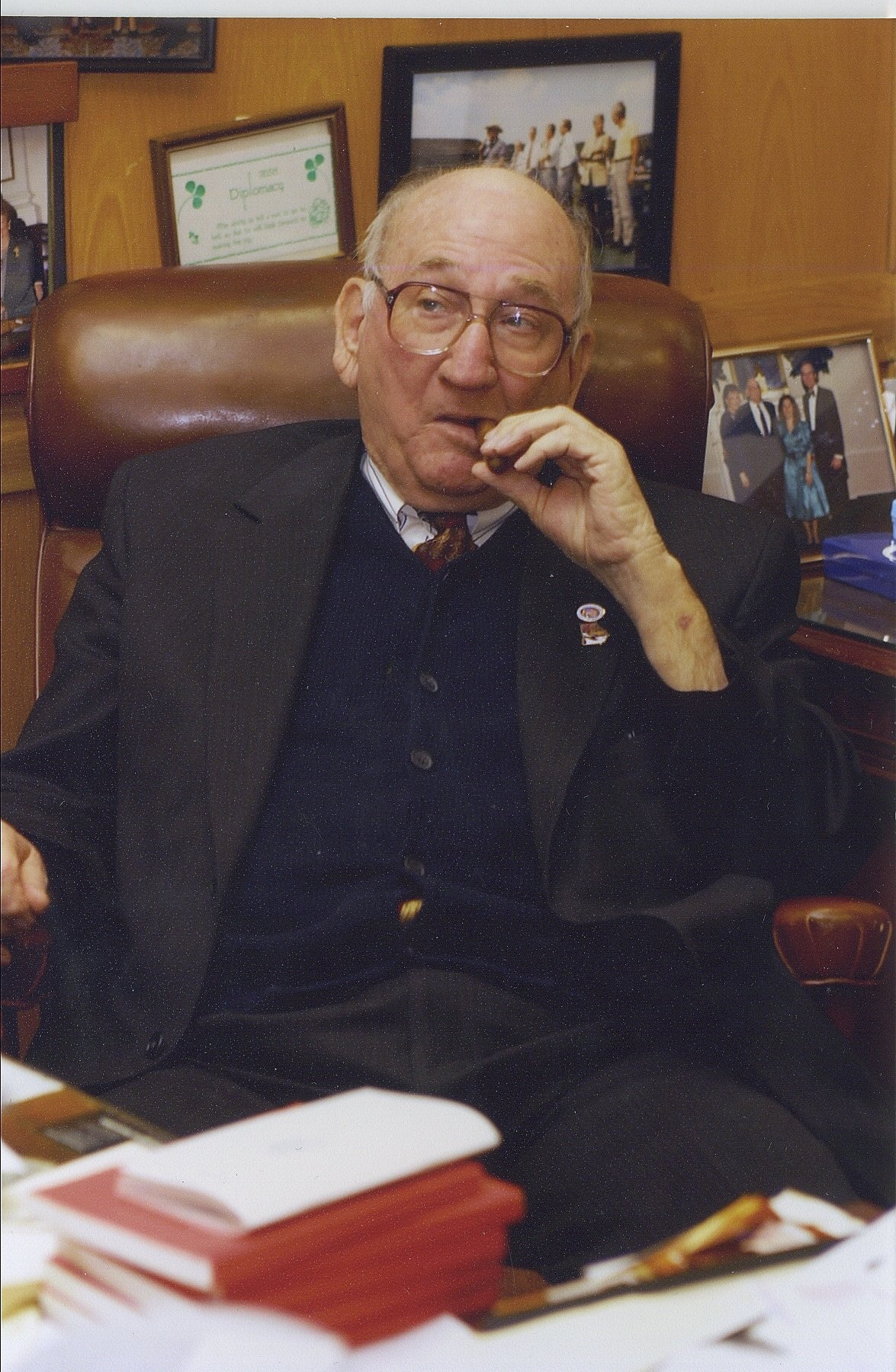

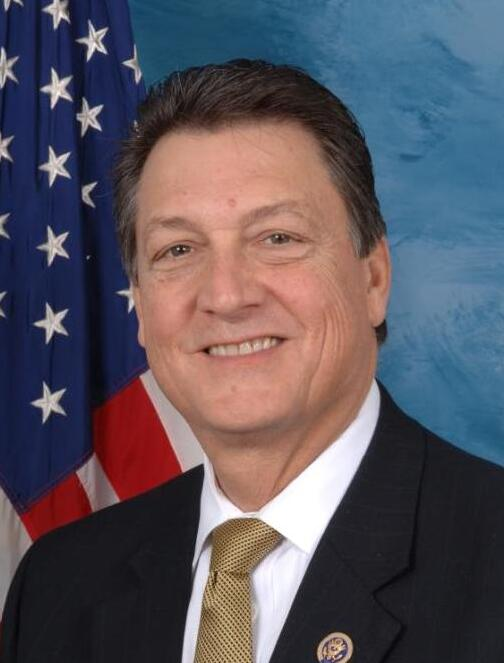
	Majority party	Minority party
Leader	Tom Murphy (lost re-election)	Lynn Westmoreland
Party	Democratic	Republican
Leader's seat	18th	104th
Last election	105	74
Seats won	107	72
Seat change	▲2	▼2
Popular vote	1,347,443	1,306,913
Percentage	50.42%	48.90%
Speaker before election
Tom Murphy
Democratic
Elected Speaker
Terry Coleman
Democratic

The 2002 Georgia House of Representatives election was held on November 5, 2002, as part of the biennial Georgia state elections as well as the biennial United States elections. Georgia voters elected state representatives in all 180 of the state house's districts to the 147th Georgia General Assembly. State representatives serve two-year terms in the Georgia House of Representatives.

Primaries were held on August 20, 2002, coinciding with primaries for U.S. Senate, U.S. House, Georgia State Senate, county and regional prosecutorial offices. In the general election, Democrats flipped two seats from the Republicans. However, Democratic speaker Tom Murphy lost re-election in his district, resulting in fellow Democrat Terry Coleman succeeding him as Speaker. Furthermore, Republicans won the governorship and State Senate in the same election, resulting in a divided General Assembly.

It was the first election to use district maps drawn by the Democratic majorities in the 146th General Assembly from the 2000 United States redistricting cycle. Following Republican litigation, a federal court approved a special master to redraw districts for the State House and state Senate. Additionally, following the election, four Democratic representatives joined the Republican caucus. Both events helped lead to Democrats losing the House in the 2004 election.

It is the most recent House election in which Democrats retained the majority of seats. It also marks the most recent House election in which Democrats won the statewide popular vote, as well as the narrowest popular vote split prior to the 2020 House election. It is also the most recent election to use multi-member districts, which had been revived after being eliminated by 1992.

== Results ==
=== Summary ===
Summary of the November 5, 2002 Georgia House of Representatives election results
Party	Candidates	Votes	%	Seats	+/–	%
Republican	118	1306913	48.90%	72	-2	40.00%
Democratic	131	1347443	50.42%	107	+2	59.44%
Libertarian	4	5931	0.22%	0		0%
Independent	2	12265	0.46%	1	–	0.56%
Total	255	2,672,552	100.00%	180	–	
