= Tom Triplett =

American politician

Member of the Georgia House of Representatives from the 128th district
- In office 1971–1991
- Succeeded by: Sonny Dixon

Personal details
- Born: March 11, 1935 Watauga County, North Carolina, U.S.
- Died: June 23, 2006 (aged 71)
- Party: Democratic
- Spouse: Judy Lancaster
- Children: 3
- Education: Bluefield University

Tom Triplett (March 11, 1935 – June 23, 2006) was an American politician. He served as a Democratic member for the 128th district of the Georgia House of Representatives.

== Life and career ==
Triplett was born in Watauga County, North Carolina. He attended Bluefield University and served in the United States Air Force.

Triplett was mayor of Port Wentworth, Georgia. In 1971, he was elected to represent the 128th district of the Georgia House of Representatives. He served until 1991, when he was succeeded by Sonny Dixon.

Triplett died in June 2006 of cancer, at the age of 71.
