= Wes Cantrell =

American politician

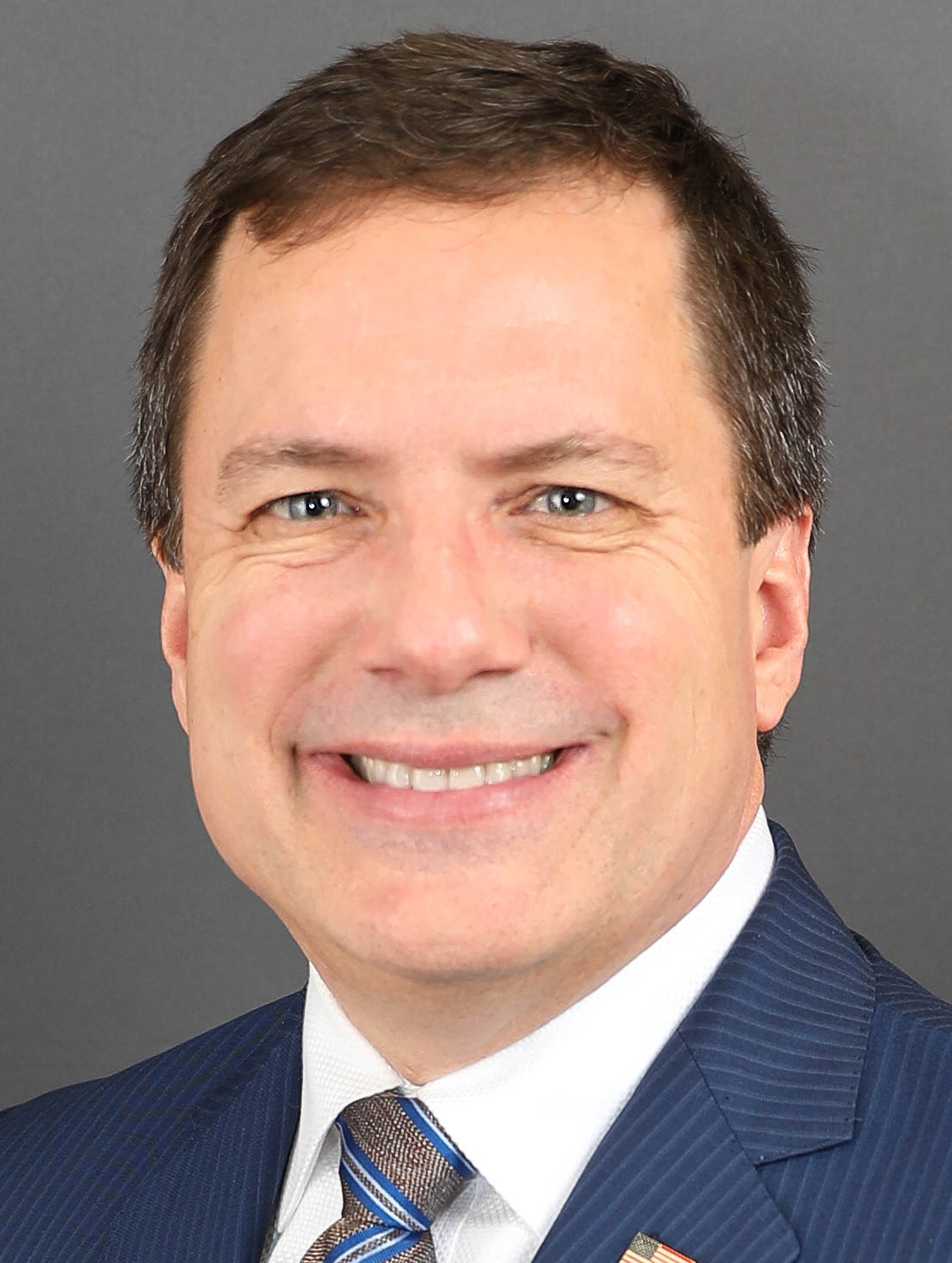

Member of the Georgia House of Representatives from the 22nd district
- In office January 12, 2015 – January 9, 2023
- Preceded by: Calvin Hill
- Succeeded by: Jordan Ridley

Personal details
- Born: Wesley Eugene Cantrell; September 12, 1961 (age 64) Augusta, Georgia
- Party: Republican
- Spouse: Jane

Wesley Eugene Cantrell (born September 12, 1961) is an American politician. He is a former member of the Georgia House of Representatives from the 22nd District, serving from 2015 to 2023. Cantrell has sponsored 96 bills. He is a member of the Republican Party.

Georgia House of Representatives
Preceded by Calvin Hill	Member of the Georgia House of Representatives from the 22nd district 2015–2023	Succeeded by Jordan Ridley
