= Carl Von Epps Jr. =

US politician and pastor

Carl Von Epps Jr. is an American pastor and former Democratic politician who served in the Georgia House of Representatives from 1992 to 2014. A resident of LaGrange, Georgia, he is recognized for his significant contributions to both the religious and political communities in the state.

== Early life and education ==
Carl Von Epps Jr. was born on October 16, 1948, in LaGrange, Georgia. He pursued higher education at Morehouse College, earning a Bachelor of Arts degree in business administration. He furthered his studies by completing a program for senior executives in state and local government at Harvard University's John F. Kennedy School of Government. In 2001, he received an honorary Doctor of Law degree from John Marshall Law School.

Epps was first elected to the Georgia House of Representatives in 1992, representing District 128, which includes parts of Troup and Meriwether counties. He served ten consecutive terms, retiring in 2014 after 22 years of service. During his tenure, he chaired the Georgia Legislative Black Caucus from 2000 to 2004.

== Religious Leadership & Community Involvement ==
In addition to his political career, Epps is an ordained minister in the United Methodist Church. He has served as the pastor of Smith Chapel United Methodist Church in Newnan, Georgia, and later as the senior pastor of Warren Temple United Methodist Church.

Epps has been actively involved in various community organizations. He served as the founding president of the West Georgia Chapter of 100 Black Men of America. He has also been a member of the Troup County Board of Health and served on the boards of the Roosevelt Warm Springs Rehabilitation Foundation and the Chattahoochee Boy Scout Council.

== See also ==
- Georgia Legislative Black Caucus
