= Sonny Dixon =

American journalist and politician

Sonny Dixon retired in May 2015 as lead anchor of THE News at 5 & 6 and "WTOC PRIME" on WTOC-TV, the CBS affiliate in Savannah, Georgia, USA. He succeeded Doug Weathers, following Weathers' retirement in 2001.

Dixon is the only Savannah anchor to win the Best Anchor Emmy Award. He has also won numerous AP Awards and an Edward R. Murrow Award. Dixon was selected as Savannah's Favorite Media Personality 14 years in a row by readers of Savannah Magazine. He has earned a similar title for many years from the readers of Connect Savannah.

Mr. Dixon returned to broadcasting after a long career in politics. He was twice elected to the Garden City, Georgia City Council, then elected to five terms in the Georgia House of Representatives, where he served on key committees, chairing several related to industry and transportation.

A strong supporter of the U.S. military, Dixon was named an Honorary Night Stalker (160th Special Operations Aviation Regiment) by the Secretary of the Army. He was also designated an Honorary U.S. Army Ranger and an Honorary Member of the 3rd Combat Aviation Brigade of the 3rd Infantry Division.

Dixon was presented with the Freedom Award by the Veteran's Council of Chatham County for consistent support of military veterans and their families.

== State representative ==
Dixon served as a State Representative in the Georgia General Assembly from 1989 to 1997. He represented West Chatham County. While in the House, he served on the Appropriations, Rules, Transportation, Reapportionment, Industry, and Interstate Cooperation Committees. He chaired the State Highways Subcommittee on Transportation.

In 2002, the Georgia Legislature voted to rename the intersection of State Route 21 and Jimmy DeLoach Parkway in his honor. The area is now known as the Sonny Dixon Interchange.

Georgia House of Representatives
Preceded by Tom Triplett (D)	Georgia State Representative from 150th district 1993–1996	Succeeded by Ron Stephens (R)
