= Pam Dickerson =

American politician (born 1953)

Member of the Georgia House of Representatives from the 113th district
- In office January 14, 2013 – January 11, 2021
- Preceded by: Chuck Williams
- Succeeded by: Sharon Henderson

Member of the Georgia House of Representatives from the 95th district
- In office January 10, 2011 – January 14, 2013
- Preceded by: Toney Collins
- Succeeded by: Tom Rice

Personal details
- Born: January 14, 1953 (age 73) New Orleans, Louisiana
- Party: Democratic

Pamela Ann Dickerson (born January 14, 1953) is an American politician who served in the Georgia House of Representatives from 2011 to 2021.
