= List of mayors of Alpharetta, Georgia =

Mayors of the city of Alpharetta, Georgia, US

The following is a list of mayors of the city of Alpharetta, Georgia, United States.

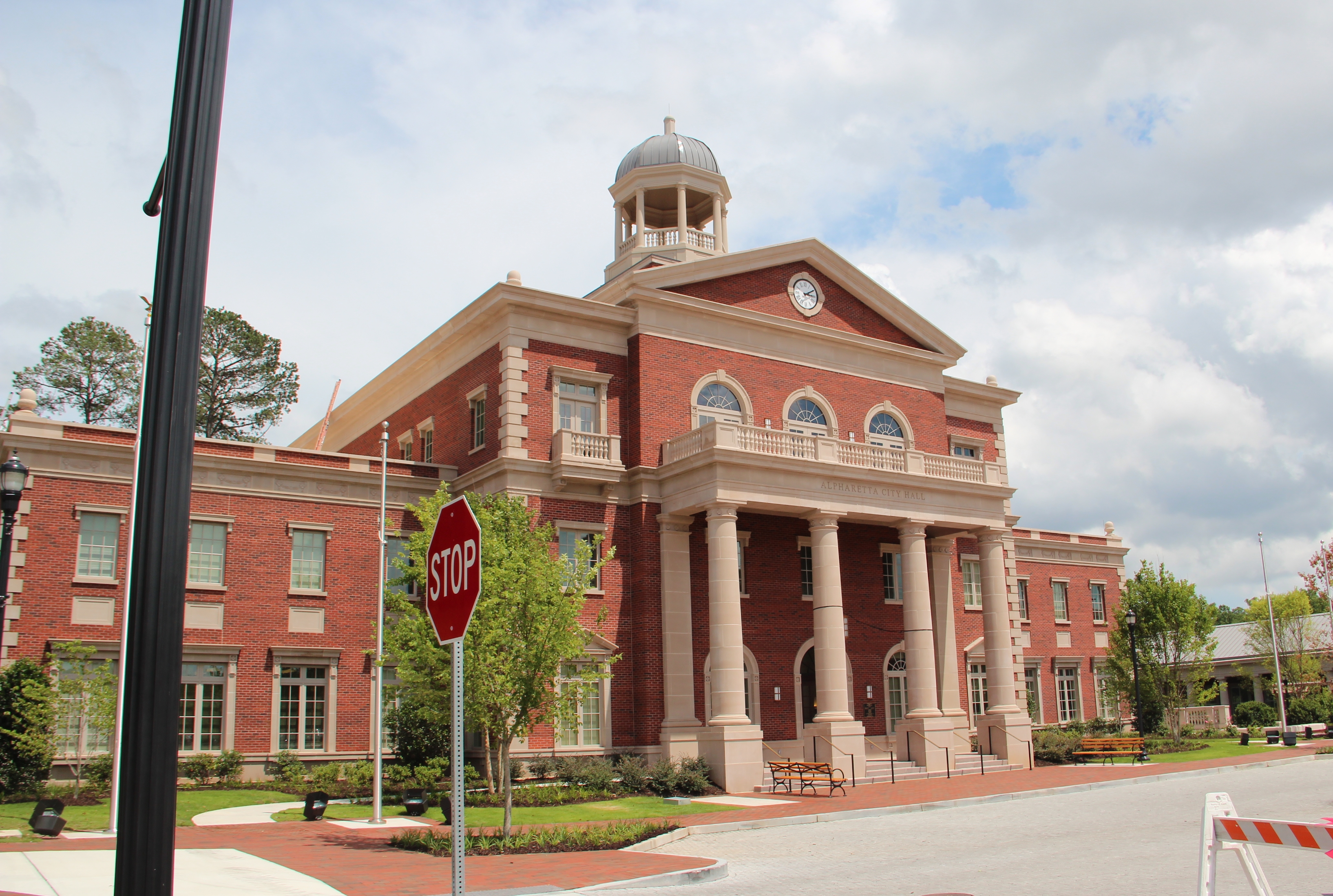
Alpharetta City Hall in 2015

== Mayors ==
- George Wills, Sr.
- Q. A. Wills
- William E. Spence
- Obadiah Calhoun Shirley
- Sim Manning
- Teasley Upshaw
- W.B. Maxwell, ca.1912
- Chuck Martin, 1996–2002
- Arthur Letchas, 2002–2011
- David Belle Isle, ca.2012–2018
- Jim Gilvin, ca.2018–present

== See also ==
- Alpharetta history
