= Patty Marie Stinson =

American politician

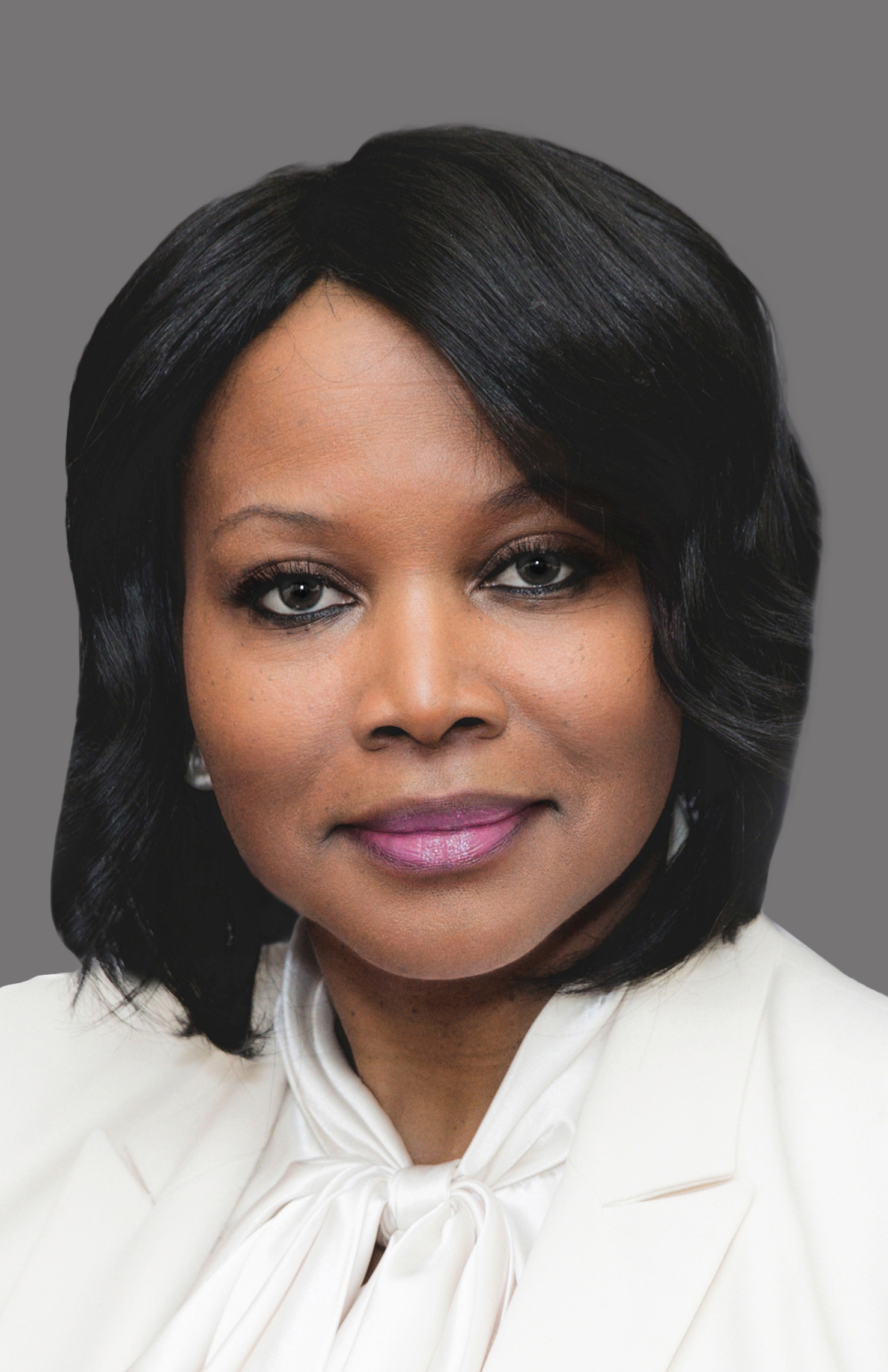

Member of the Georgia House of Representatives
- Incumbent
- Assumed office January 14, 2013
- Preceded by: James Beverly
- Constituency: 139th District (2013–2023); 150th District (2023–Present)

Personal details
- Born: Patty James Bentley; September 20, 1970 (age 55) Butler, Georgia, U.S.
- Party: Democratic
- Spouse: Bobby Stinson (m. 2023)

Patty Marie Stinson (born September 20, 1970) is an American politician who has served in the Georgia House of Representatives since 2013.

Stinson is a native of Butler, Georgia. She graduated from the Georgia Institute of Technology and subsequently served on the Taylor County Board of Elections. In 2013, she was elected to the Georgia House of Representatives from the 139th district.

Georgia House of Representatives
Preceded by James Beverly	Member of the Georgia House of Representatives from the 139th district 2013–2023	Succeeded by Richard Smith
Preceded by Matt Hatchett	Member of the Georgia House of Representatives from the 150th district 2023–Present	Incumbent
