= Leesa Hagan =

American politician

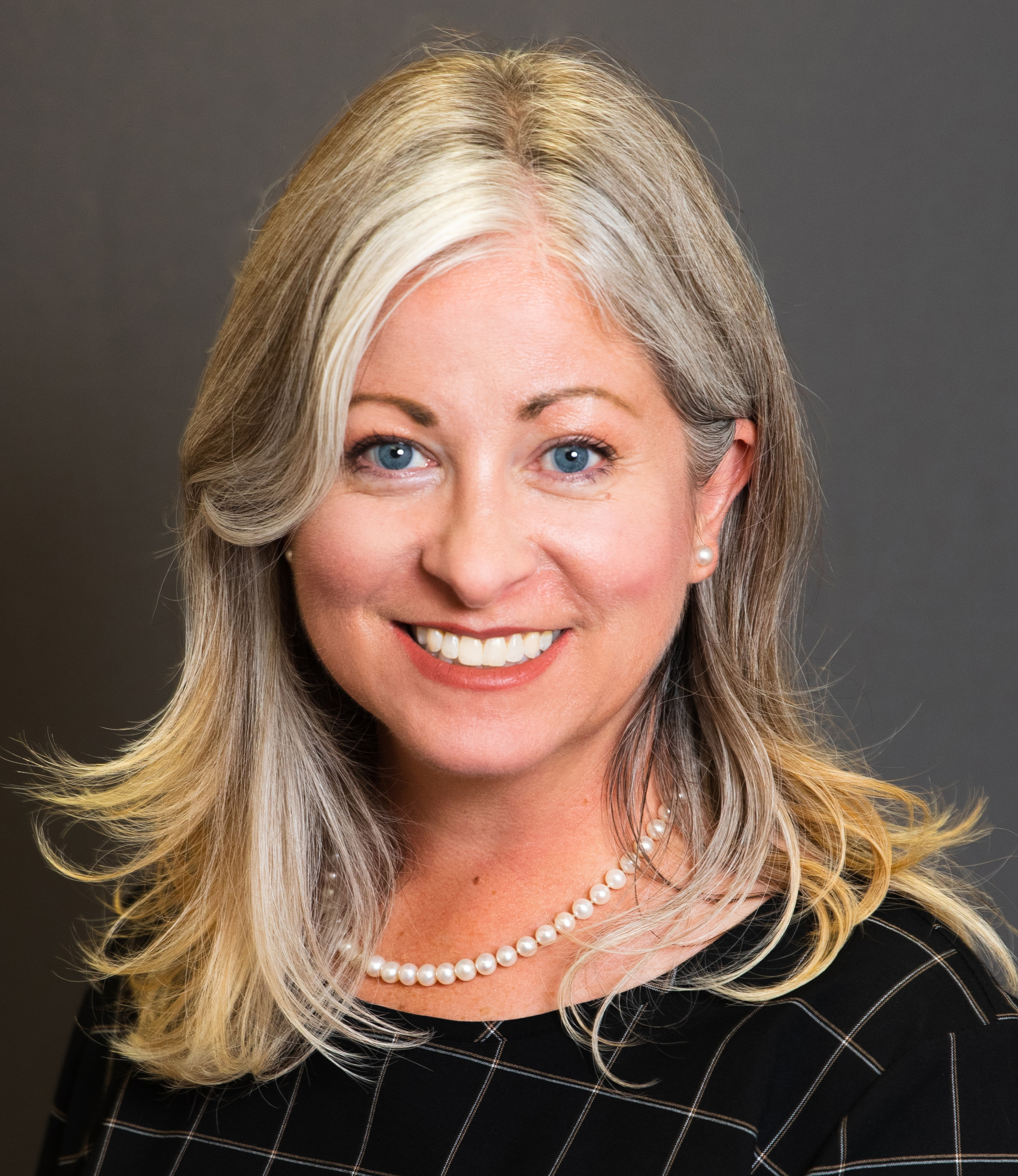

Member of the Georgia House of Representatives from the 156th district
- Incumbent
- Assumed office July 23, 2021
- Preceded by: Greg Morris

Personal details
- Born: July 16, 1972 (age 54)
- Party: Republican
- Spouse: Mike
- Children: Two
- Education: University of Georgia (B.S.Ed)

Leesa Wynn Hagan is an American politician from Georgia who serves in the Georgia House of Representatives for District 156. Her district includes Montgomery County, Toombs County and Wheeler County, as well as parts of Ben Hill County, Tattnall County and Telfair County. She was elected to represent the seat as a Republican in a special election on July 13, 2021.
