= Bill Hitchens =

American politician from Georgia

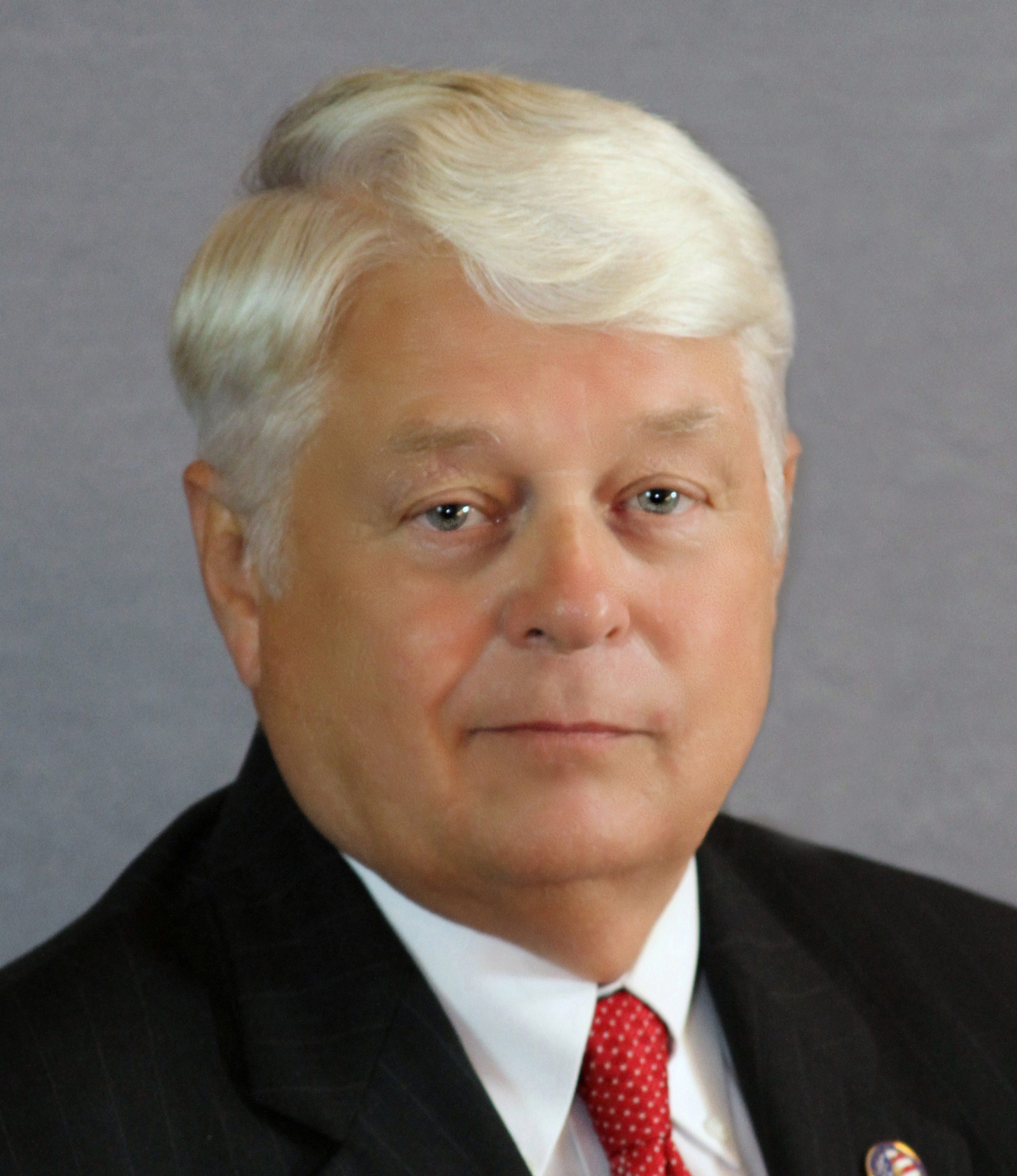
- Official headshot

Director of Georgia Office Homeland Security
- In office 2003–2005

Member of the Georgia House of Representatives from the 161st district
- Incumbent
- Assumed office January 14, 2013
- Preceded by: Mickey Stephens

Personal details
- Born: April 26, 1947 (age 79) United States
- Party: Republican
- Spouse: Norma Hitchens
- Occupation: Politician
- Other names: William W. Hitchens, William W. "Bill" Hitchens, Jr.
- Relatives: William W. Hitchens, III (son)
- Military career
- Branch: United States Marine Corps
- Service years: 1965-1969
- Conflicts: Vietnam War

William Whitehead Hitchens Jr. (born April 26, 1947) is an American former police officer, former Director of Homeland Security and current politician from Georgia. Hitchens is a Republican member of the Georgia House of Representatives from the 161st District, serving since 2012.

== Education ==
In 1975, Hitchens earned a bachelor's degree in criminal justice/political science from Georgia Southern University. Hitchens graduated from the FBI National Academy in Quantico, VA.

== Career ==
In 1965, Hitchens served in the United States Marines Corps, until 1969. Hitchens is a Vietnam veteran.

In 1969, Hitchens became a Trooper with Georgia State Patrol, until 1997.

In 1976, Hitchens served in the United States Coast Guard Reserve Unit Air Station Savannah, until 2001.

In 2002, Hitchens was appointed by Governor-Elect Sonny Perdue as the Director of Georgia Office Homeland Security. Hitchens served as Director from 2003 to 2005.

On November 6, 2012, Hitchens won the election unopposed and became a Republican member of Georgia House of Representatives for District 161. On November 4, 2014, as an incumbent, Hitchens won the election unopposed and continued serving District 161. On November 8, 2016, as an incumbent, Hitchens won the election unopposed and continued serving District 161. On November 6, 2018, as an incumbent, Hitchens won the election and continued serving District 161. Hitchens defeated Adam Bridges with 63.45% of the votes. On November 3, 2020, as an incumbent, Hitchens won the election unopposed and continued serving District 161.

== Personal life ==
Hitchens' wife is Norma Hitchens. They have 4 children. Hitchens and his family live in Rincon, Georgia.

Hitchens' son William W. Hitchens, III, is also a law enforcement officer. In 2020, Hitchens' son William W. Hitchens, III, became the Lieutenant Colonel of the Georgia State Patrol and Deputy Commissioner of Georgia Department of Public Safety.
