= Sharon Henderson =

American politician from Georgia

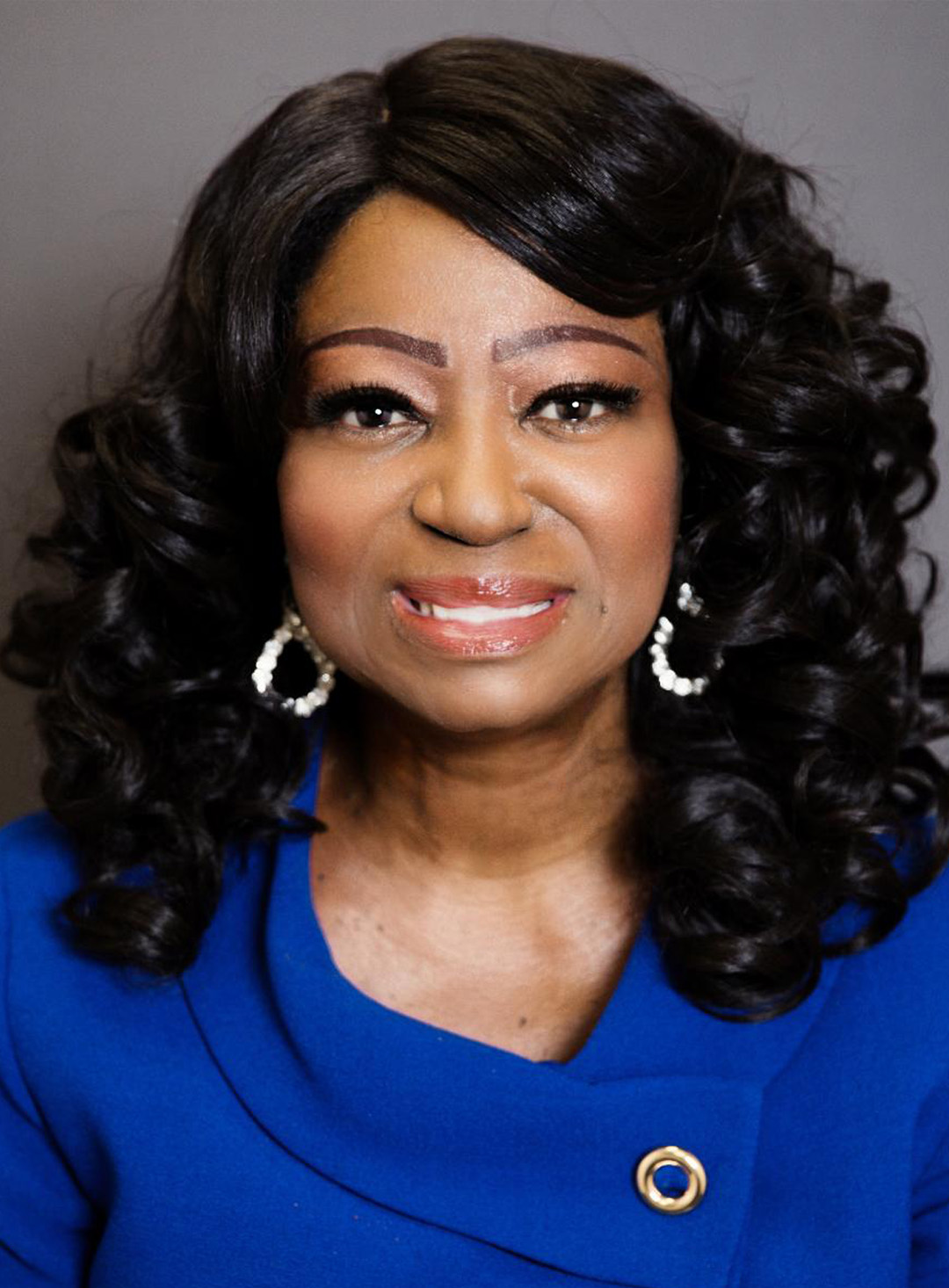

Member of the Georgia House of Representatives from the 113th district
- Incumbent
- Assumed office January 11, 2021; Suspended: January 22, 2026 – present
- Preceded by: Pam Dickerson

Personal details
- Born: December 3, 1958 (age 67) Goose Creek, South Carolina, U.S.
- Party: Democratic
- Spouse: Jerome

Sharon L. Henderson (born December 3, 1958) is an American politician from Georgia. Henderson is a Democratic member of the Georgia House of Representatives for District 113 since 2021. In January 2026, Henderson was suspended from the legislature by Governor Brian Kemp after she was indicted for fraud related to COVID-19 pandemic era unemployment funds.
