= Georgia's 150th House of Representatives district =

State district in Georgia, USA

Georgia's 150th State House of Representatives district
Representative
Patty Marie Stinson; D–Butler
- Demographics: 60.4% White; 34.9% Black; 2.5% Hispanic; 1.1% Asian
- Population: 53,804

District 150 elects one member of the Georgia House of Representatives. It contains the entirety of Dooly County, Macon County and Taylor County, as well as parts of Peach County and Sumter County.

== Members ==
- Sonny Dixon (1993–1996)
- Ron Stephens (1997–2003)
- Winfred Dukes (2005–2013)
- Matt Hatchett (2013–2023)
- Patty Marie Stinson (since 2023)
