= Ron Stephens (Georgia politician) =

American pharmacist and politician from Georgia

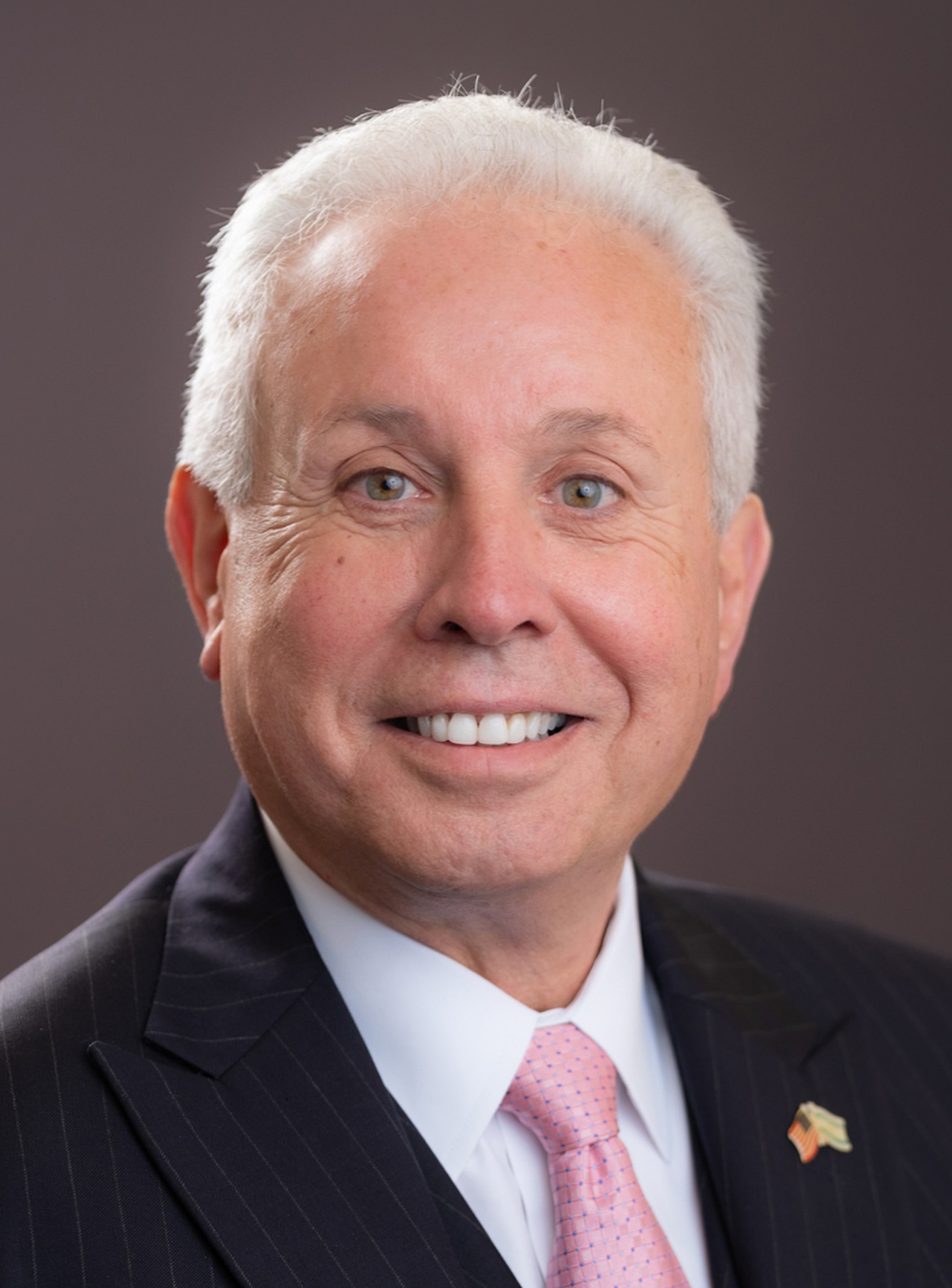
- Official headshot

Member of the Georgia House of Representatives
- Incumbent
- Assumed office July 20, 1997
- Preceded by: Sonny Dixon
- Constituency: 150th district (1997–2003); 123rd district (2003–2005); 164th district (2005–present)

Personal details
- Born: July 3, 1954 (age 72) Lyons, Georgia, U.S.
- Party: Republican
- Spouse: Janice Stephens
- Children: 2
- Occupation: Pharmacist, politician
- Known for: 2000 Stephens-Day property tax limit measure

James Ronald Stephens (born July 3, 1954) is an American pharmacist and politician from Georgia. Stephens is a Republican member of the Georgia House of Representatives from the 164th District. Stephens has served in the Georgia House of Representatives since 1997.

== Early life ==
On July 3, 1954, Stephens was born in Lyons, Georgia, U.S.

== Education ==
In 1978, Stephens earned a Bachelor of Science degree in Pharmacy from Armstrong State & Mercer University.

== Career ==
In 1978, Stephens became a pharmacist, until 1998.

In 1991, Stephens was elected to the Garden City Council.

Stephens was elected and sworn in as a Republican member of the Georgia House of Representatives on July 20, 1997.

On November 2, 2004, Stephens won the election unopposed for District 164. On November 6, 2018, as an incumbent, Stephens won the election and continued serving District 164. Stephens defeated Alicia Scott with 52.46% of the votes. On November 3, 2020, as an incumbent, Stephens won the election and continued serving District 164. Stephens defeated Marcus Thompson with 52.56% of the votes.

Stephens is known for the author of 2000 Stephens-Day property tax limit measure, which passed and became effective January 1, 2001.

== Personal life ==
Stephens' wife is Janice Stephens. They have two children. Stephens and his family live in Garden City, Georgia and currently live in Savannah, Georgia .

Georgia House of Representatives
Preceded by Sonny Dixon	Member of the Georgia House of Representatives from the 150th district 1997–2003	Succeeded by Winfred Dukes
Preceded by Kenneth W. "Ken" Birdsong	Member of the Georgia House of Representatives from the 123rd district 2003–2005	Succeeded by Alberta Anderson
Preceded by A. Richard Royal	Member of the Georgia House of Representatives from the 164th district 2005–present	Incumbent
