= Jordan Ridley (politician) =

American politician (born 1992)

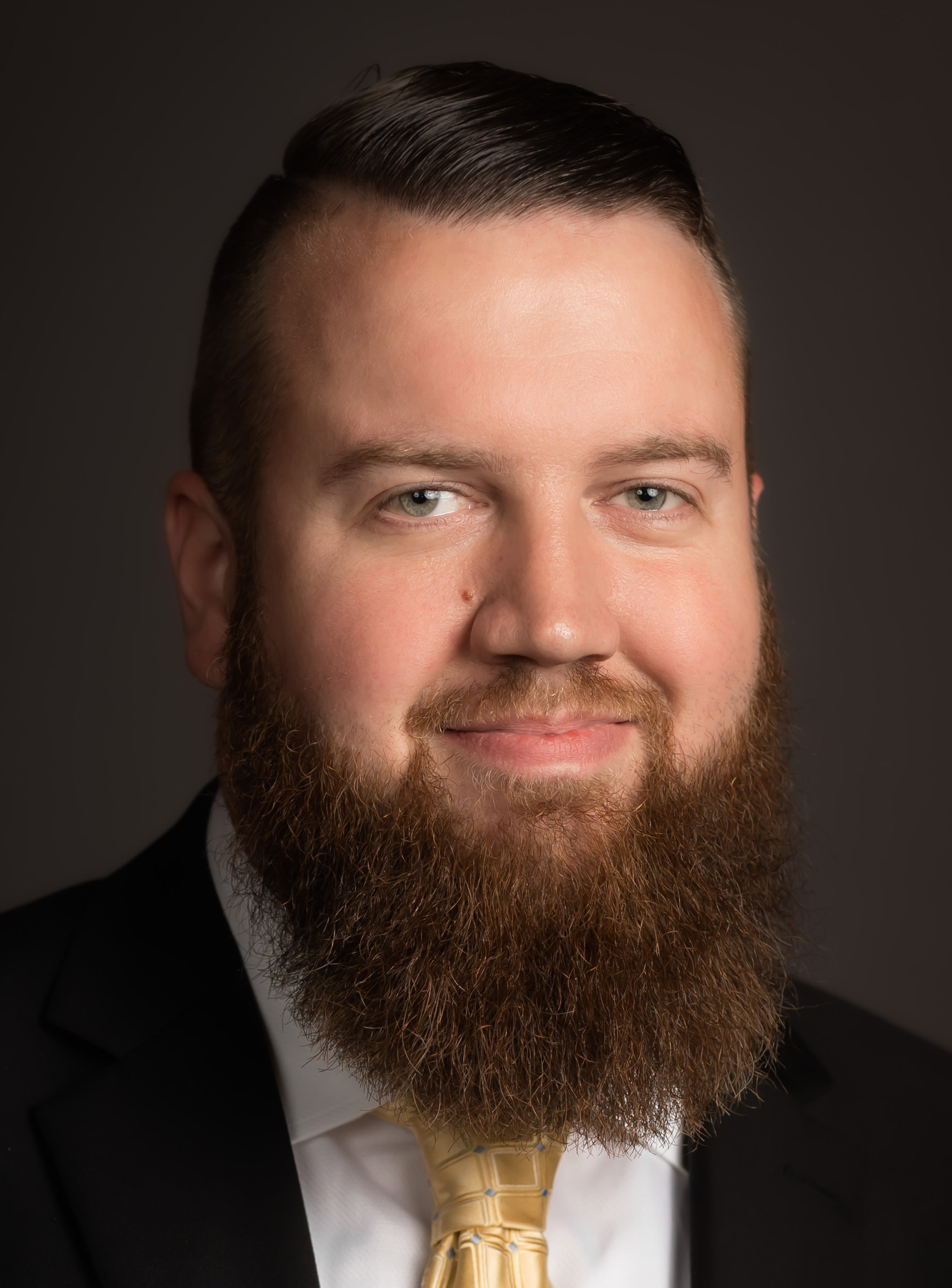
- Official headshot

Member of the Georgia House of Representatives from the 22nd district
- Incumbent
- Assumed office January 9, 2023
- Preceded by: Wes Cantrell

Personal details
- Born: April 21, 1992 (age 34) Georgia, U.S.
- Party: Republican
- Education: Georgia State University (BA)

Jordan Ridley is an American politician. He serves as a Republican member for the 22nd district of the Georgia House of Representatives.

His district encompasses portions of Cobb and Cherokee counties, the cities of Sutallee and Victoria, and around 54,000 people.

== Elections ==
In May 2022, Ridley secured the Republican party nomination for the 22nd District House seat, defeating Donna Kosicki. In November 2022, he defeated Stacee Lashone Hill in the general election, winning 61 percent of the votes. He succeeded Wes Cantrell. He assumed his office in 2023.

2022 General election for Georgia House of Representative District 22
Party	Candidate	Votes	%
Republican	Jordan Ridley	14,685	61.5%
Democratic	Stacee Lashone Hill	9,190	38.5%
Majority		5,495	23%

Ridley won reelection in the 2024 general election, defeating republican challenger Paul Kettering in the May 2024 Republican primary and Democratic opponent James Shade in the November general election.

2024 General election for Georgia House of Representative District 22
Party	Candidate	Votes	%
Republican	Jordan Ridley	19,402	60.5%
Democratic	James Shade	12,642	39.5%
Majority		6,760	21%
Republican hold

== Political positions ==
Ridley introduced legislation to provide third-parties the right of discovery in cases before the Georgia Public Service Commission, the agency that regulates utility providers. The bill aims to allow citizens the ability to receive and compel information that would make challenging rate-hikes easier.

He also sponsored a bill that would require restaurants to place a label on lab-grown meat, which passed the House in a 161-3 vote, but stalled in the state Senate.

Ridley was one of eight House Republicans to vote against Kemp-backed efforts at tort reform.

== Personal life ==
Ridley attended Georgia State University.

== Gallery ==
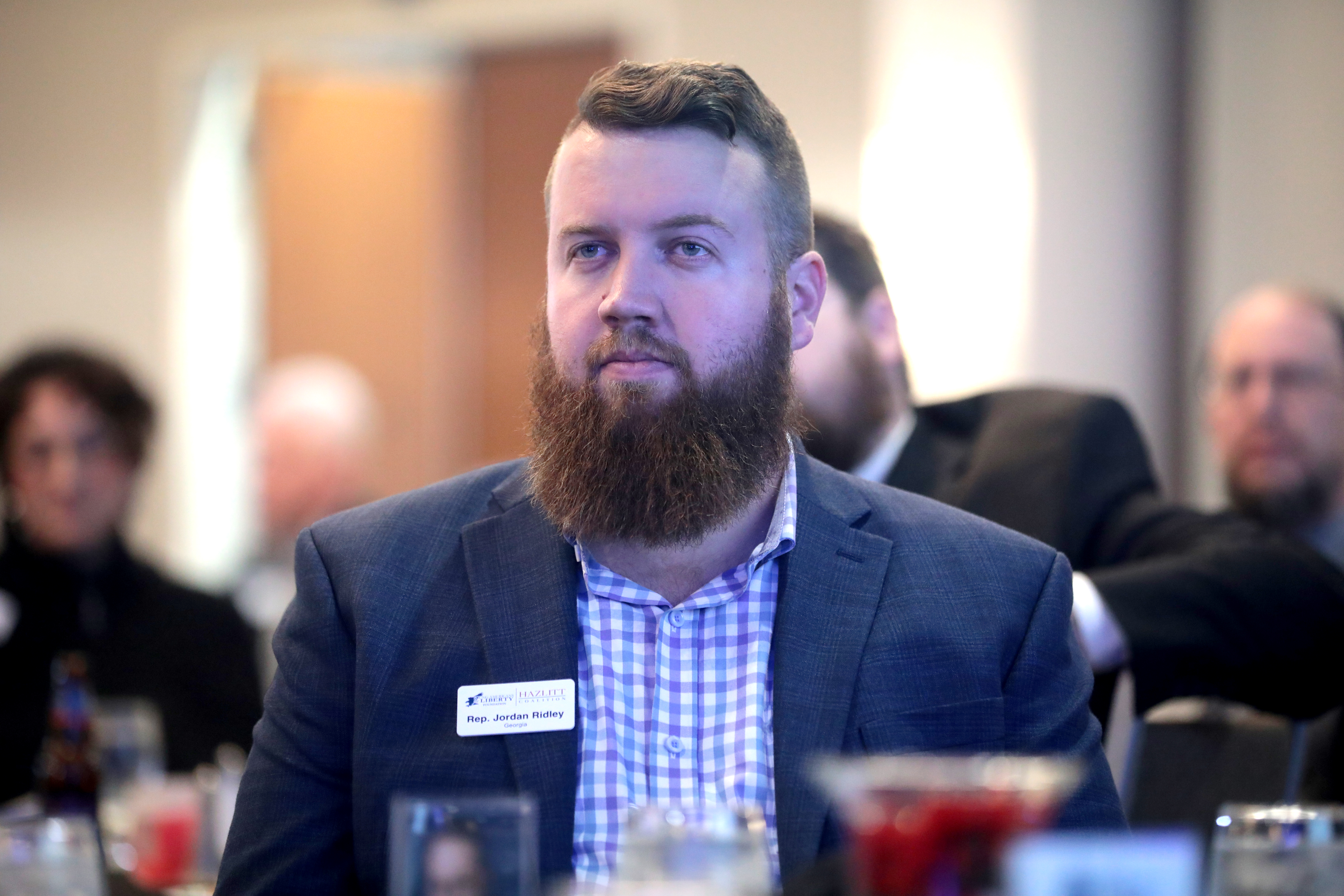
Jordan Ridley speaking with attendees at the 2022 Hazlitt Summit hosted by the Young Americans for Liberty Foundation

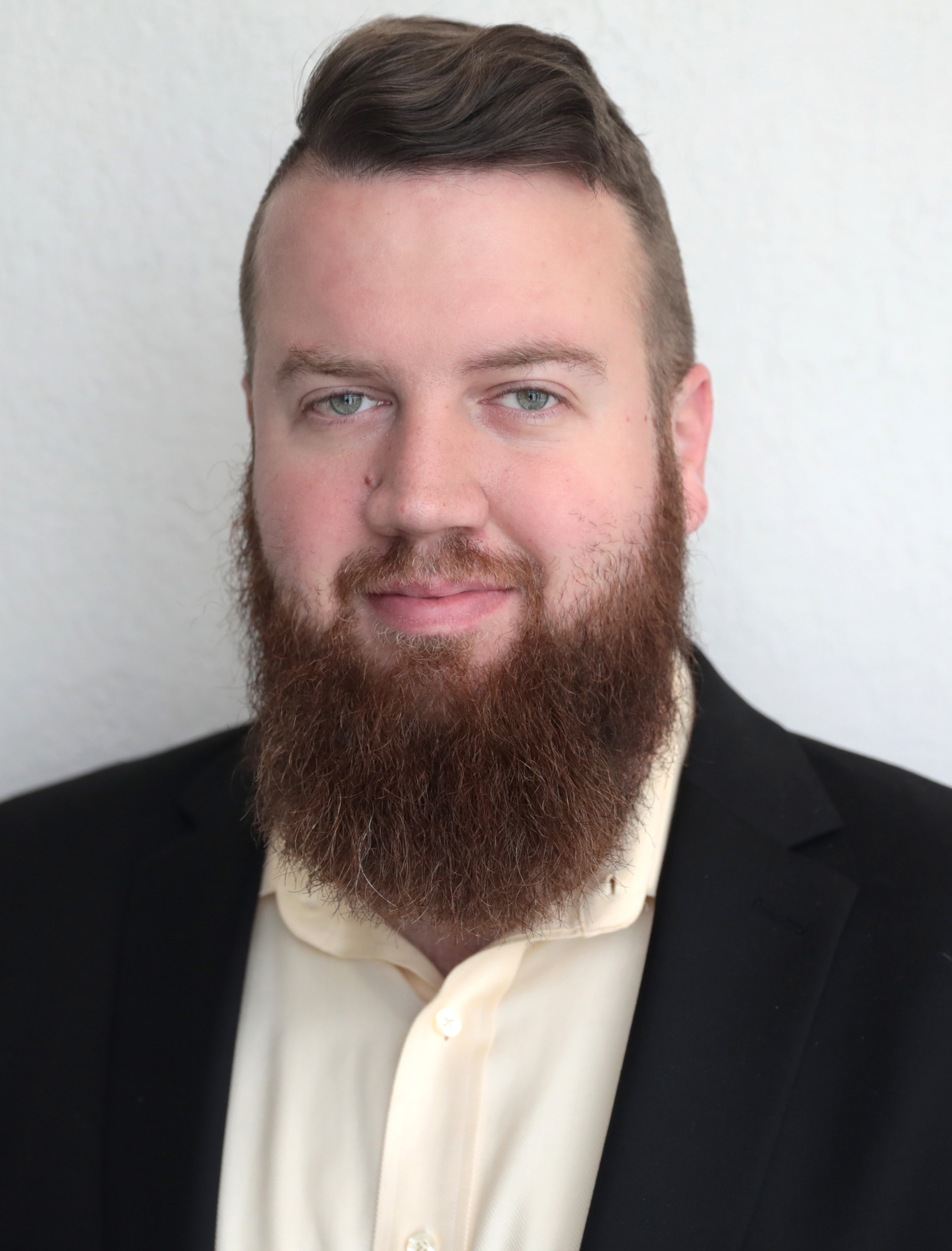
Jordan Ridley at the 2022 Hazlitt Summit hosted by Young Americans for Liberty in Orlando, Florida.
