= Kimberly Alexander =

American politician from Georgia

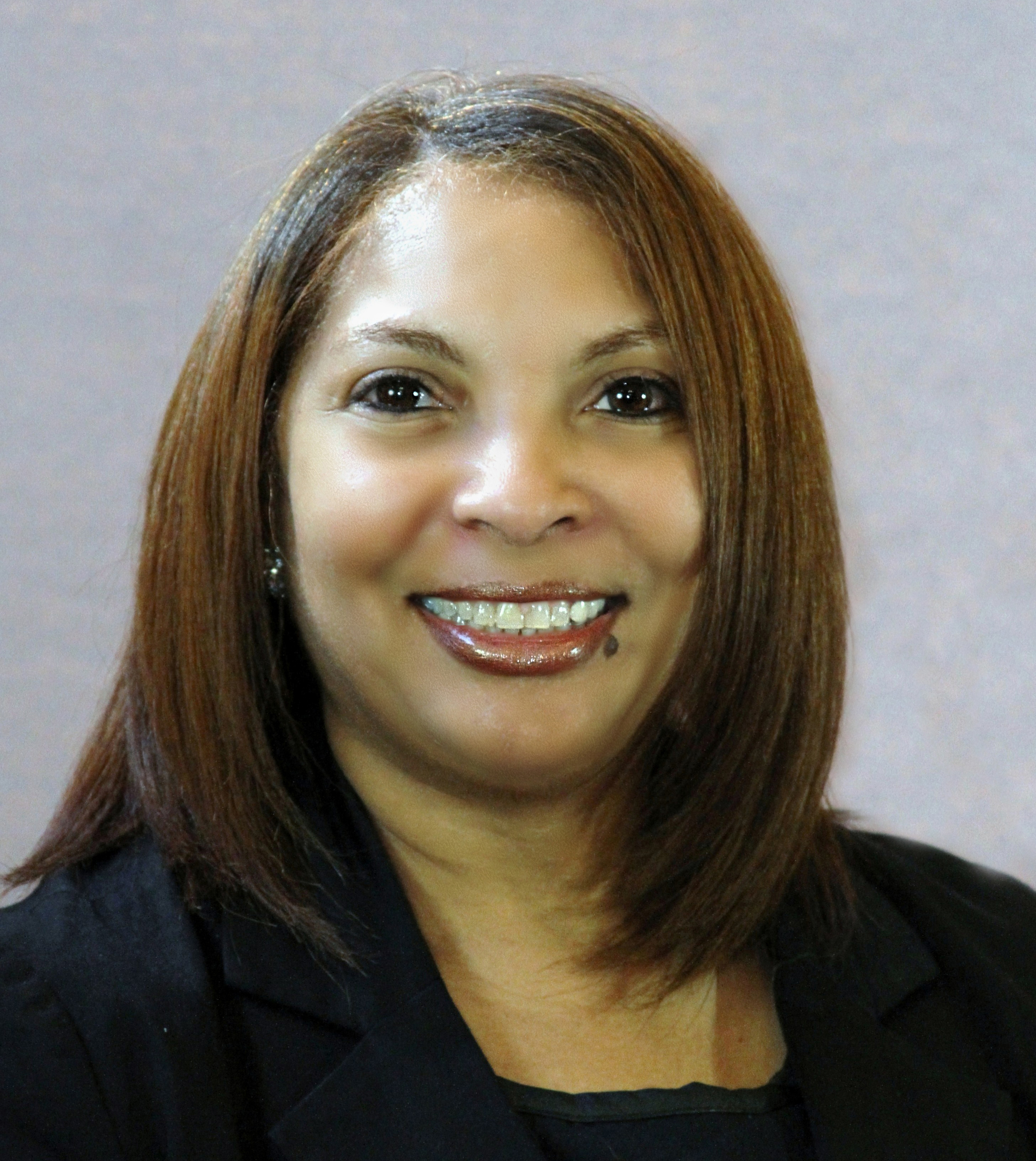

Member of the Georgia House of Representatives from the 66th district
- Incumbent
- Assumed office January 14, 2013
- Preceded by: Bob Snelling

Personal details
- Born: November 26, 1961 (age 64) Hiram, Georgia, U.S.
- Party: Democratic
- Education: Morris Brown College; Central Michigan University
- Profession: Auditor
- Website: www.kimaalexander.com

Kimberly A. Alexander (born November 26, 1961) is an American politician and Democratic member of the Georgia House of Representatives for District 66, serving since 2012. Alexander defeated Republican former state Representative Bob Snelling to take the seat.
