= Matt Hatchett =

American businessman and politician from Georgia

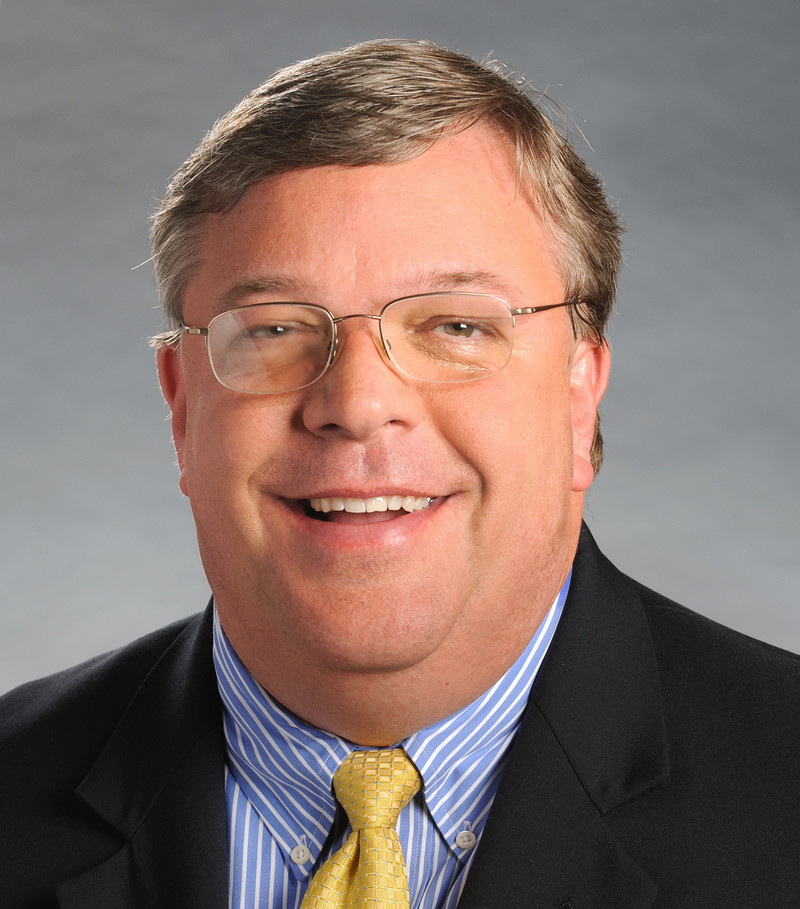
- Official headshot

Member of the Georgia House of Representatives
- Incumbent
- Assumed office January 10, 2011
- Preceded by: DuBose Porter
- Constituency: 143rd District (2011–2013); 150th District (2013–2023); 155th District (2023–Present)

Personal details
- Born: James Matthew Hatchett; April 12, 1966 (age 60) Dublin, Georgia, U.S.
- Party: Republican
- Spouse: Kim Hatchett
- Children: 2
- Education: Presbyterian College
- Occupation: Businessman and politician

James Matthew Hatchett (born April 12, 1966) is an American businessman and politician from Georgia. Hatchett is a Republican member of the Georgia House of Representatives from the 155th District.

== Early life ==
Hatchett was born in Dublin, Georgia. Hatchett graduated from Dublin High School.

== Education ==
In 1988, Hatchett earned a Bachelor of Science degree in Applied Mathematics from Presbyterian College.

== Career ==
Hatchett is a businessman.

In 1999, Hatchett became a city councilman of Dublin, Georgia until 2009.

On November 2, 2010, Hatchett won the election and became a Republican member of Georgia House of Representatives for District 143. Hatchett defeated Pablo Santamaria with 54.71% of the vote.

On November 6, 2012, Hatchett won the election and became a Republican member of Georgia House of Representatives for District 150. On November 4, 2014, as an incumbent, Hatchett won the election unopposed and continued serving District 150. On November 8, 2016, as an incumbent, Hatchett won the election unopposed and continued serving District 150. On November 6, 2018, as an incumbent, Hatchett won the election unopposed and continued serving District 150. On November 3, 2020, as an incumbent, Hatchett won the election unopposed and continued serving District 150. In 2022, he was redistricted to District 155.

Hatchett is a Majority Caucus Chairman of Georgia Republican Party.

== Personal life ==
Hatchett's wife is Kim Hatchett. They have two children. Hatchett and his family live in Dublin, Georgia.

Georgia House of Representatives
| Preceded by DuBose Porter | Member of the Georgia House of Representatives from the 143rd district 2011–2013 | Succeeded by James Beverly |
| Preceded by Winfred Dukes | Member of the Georgia House of Representatives from the 150th district 2013–2023 | Succeeded by Patty Bentley |
| Preceded by Clay Pirkle | Member of the Georgia House of Representatives from the 155th district 2023–Present | Incumbent |
