= David Sampson (politician) =

American politician

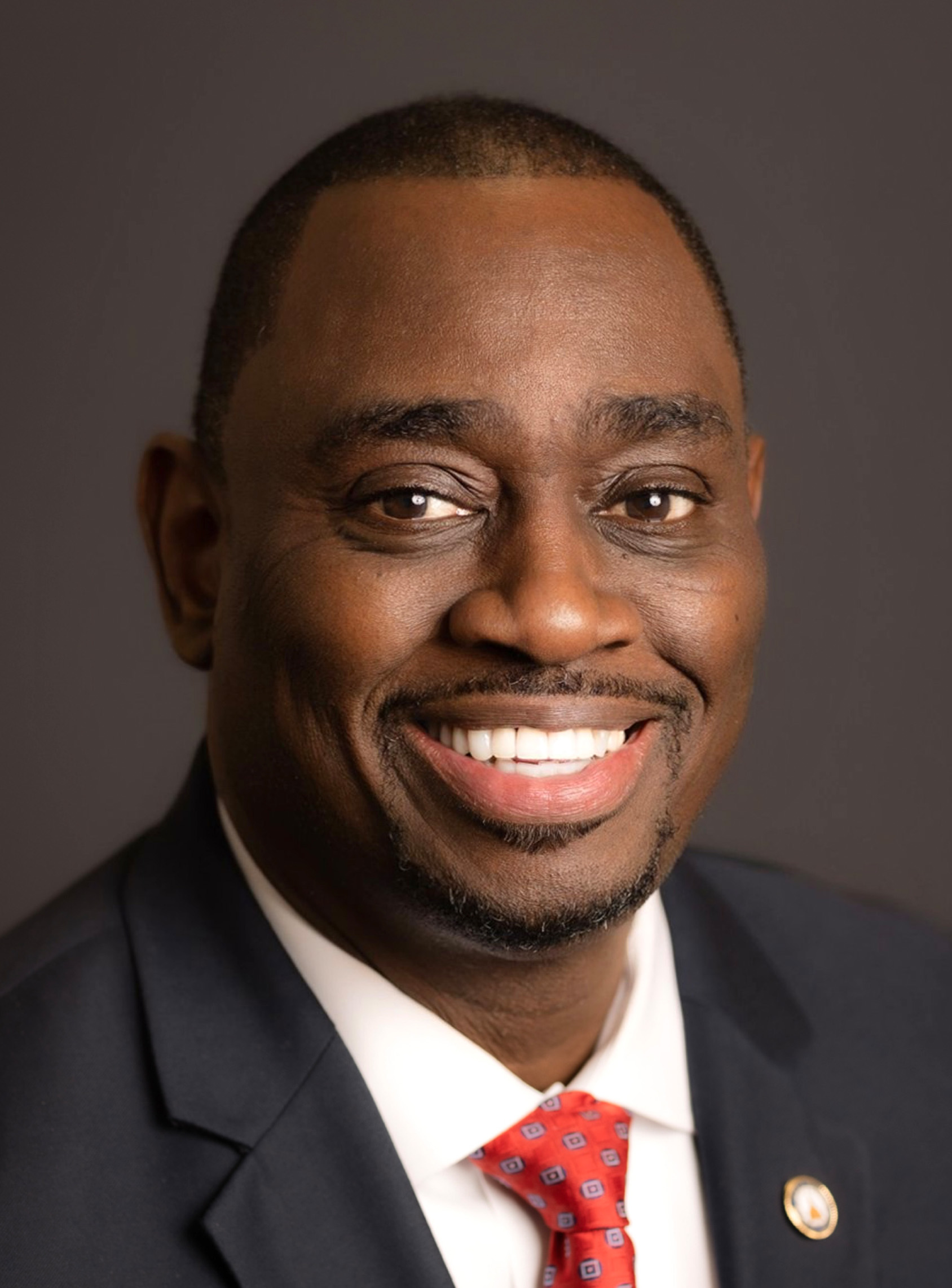

Member of the Georgia House of Representatives from the 153rd district
- Incumbent
- Assumed office January 9, 2023
- Preceded by: CaMia Hopson (redistricting)

Personal details
- Born: Arkansas
- Party: Democratic

David Lee Sampson is an American politician. He is a member of the Georgia House of Representatives from the 153rd District.
