= Demetrius Douglas =

American politician (born 1967)

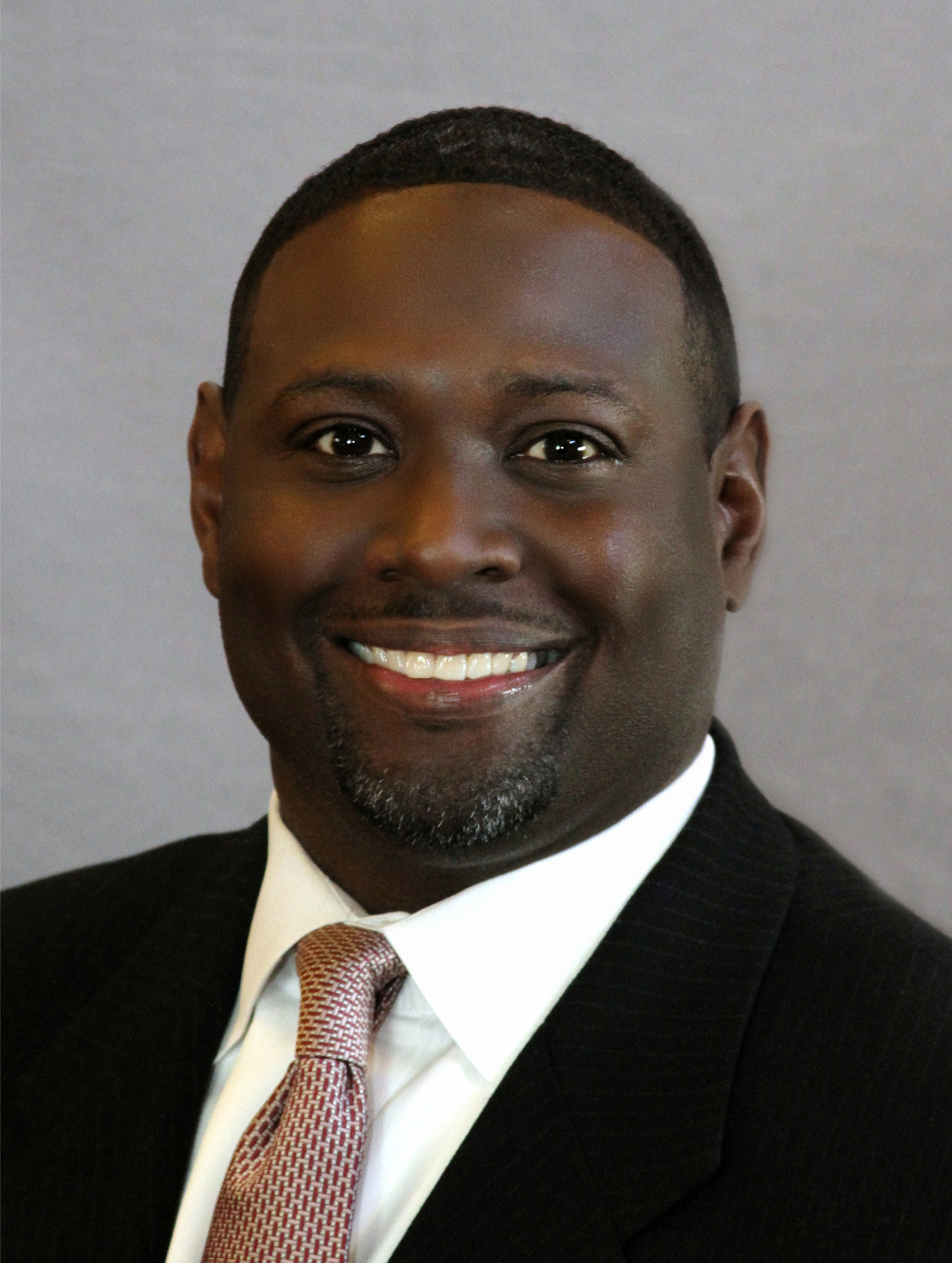

Member of the Georgia House of Representatives from the 78th district
- Incumbent
- Assumed office January 14, 2013
- Preceded by: Glenn Baker

Personal details
- Born: June 8, 1967 (age 59)
- Party: Democratic
- Spouse: Veda
- Education: University of Georgia (BS)

Demetrius M. Douglas (born June 8, 1967) is an American politician who has been a Democratic member of the Georgia House of Representatives since 2013. Douglas represents District 78 which contains parts of Clayton County and Henry County.

Douglas was a linebacker for the University of Georgia Bulldogs. He also played briefly in the NFL and CFL. Douglas is currently a mortgage broker and high school football coach. Douglas signed with the New York Jets in May 1990 for the team's 1990 season but was soon released. He then signed with the Calgary Stampeders for two years. Douglas finally moved to the Washington Redskins, but suffered an ankle injury on the second day of practice.
