= Chuck Martin (politician) =

American politician

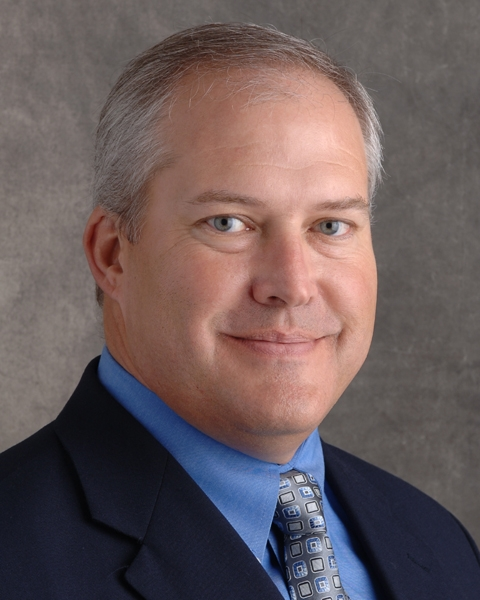

Member of the Georgia House of Representatives
- Incumbent
- Assumed office January 13, 2003
- Constituency: 37th district (2003–2005); 47th district (2005–2013); 49th district (2013–present)

Mayor, Alpharetta, Georgia
- In office 1996–2002

City Councillor, Alpharetta, Georgia
- In office 1993–1995

Personal details
- Born: July 20, 1961 (age 65) Alpharetta, Georgia, U.S.
- Party: Republican
- Spouse: Johnna
- Children: 2
- Education: University of Georgia
- Website: www.martinforgeorgia.com

Charles E. Martin Jr. (born July 20, 1961) is an American politician. He is a Republican representing the 49th district in the Georgia House of Representatives.

Martin was a City Councillor in Alpharetta, Georgia from 1993 to 1995, and mayor from 1996 to 2002. Martin has represented Fulton County, Georgia in the Georgia House of Representatives since 2003, and has been the Chairman of the Higher Education Committee since 2019. Since 2013 he has represented District 49.

After Joe Biden won the 2020 presidential election in Georgia and Donald Trump refused to concede while making false claims of fraud, Martin supported a performance review of the top election official in Fulton County, a heavily Democratic county. There was no evidence of meaningful fraud or wrongdoing in Fulton County.
