= Georgia's 164th House of Representatives district =

State district in Georgia, USA

Georgia's 164th State House of Representatives district
Representative
Ron Stephens; R–Savannah
- Demographics: 58.5% White; 25.3% Black; 9.6% Hispanic; 2.9% Asian
- Population: 61,591

District 164 elects one member of the Georgia House of Representatives. It contains parts of Bryan County and Chatham County.

== Members ==
- A. Richard Royal (until 2005)
- Ron Stephens (since 2005)
