= 2002 Georgia state elections =

2002 Georgia elections
- November 5, 2002

== State elections ==
=== Governor ===
Republican State Senator Sonny Perdue defeated Democratic incumbent Roy Barnes defeated in the general election to become the 81st Governor of Georgia.

=== Lieutenant Governor ===
Democratic incumbent Mark Taylor defeated Republican state representative Steve Stancil for a second term.

=== Attorney General ===
Democratic incumbent Attorney General Thurbert Baker won a second full term.

=== Secretary of State ===
Democratic incumbent Cathy Cox won re-election.

=== Labor Commissioner ===
Democratic incumbent Mike Thurmond won re-election.

=== Insurance and Fire Commissioner ===
Republican incumbent John Oxendine won re-election.

=== School Superintendent ===
Republican state representative Kathy Cox defeated Democratic candidate Joe Martin and Libertarian Michael Cartwright.

=== Public Service Commission ===
For District 1, Republican Doug Everett defeated Democratic incumbent Earleen Sizemore 52.5 to 47.5. Democratic incumbent Lauren McDonald was forced to a runoff by Republican candidate Angelia Speir for Seat 4 (and Libertarian Jim Harris being eliminated in the first round), with Spears defeating McDonald in the runoff.

=== Georgia General Assembly ===
Members were elected to the 147th Georgia General Assembly. Republicans won the State Senate for the first time since Reconstruction, while Democrats retained the State House.
