= Georgia's 49th House of Representatives district =

State district in Georgia, USA

Georgia's 49th State House of Representatives district
Representative
Chuck Martin; R–Alpharetta
- Demographics: 62.4% White; 9.8% Black; 7.8% Hispanic; 15.5% Asian
- Population: 58,494

District 49 elects one member of the Georgia House of Representatives. It contains parts of Fulton County.

== Members ==
- Chuck Martin (since 2013)
