= Georgia's 156th House of Representatives district =

State district in Georgia, USA

Georgia's 156th State House of Representatives district
Representative
Leesa Hagan; R–Lyons
- Demographics: 65.0% White; 23.0% Black; 9.5% Hispanic; 0.7% Asian
- Population: 53,699

District 156 elects one member of the Georgia House of Representatives. It contains the entirety of Montgomery County, Toombs County and Wheeler County, as well as parts of Ben Hill County, Tattnall County and Telfair County.

== Members ==
- Greg Morris (2013–2021)
- Leesa Hagan (since 2021)
