= Georgia's 113th House of Representatives district =

State district in Georgia, USA

Georgia's 113th State House of Representatives district
Representative
Sharon Henderson; D–Covington
- Demographics: 29.7% White; 61.8% Black; 5.5% Hispanic; 1.0% Asian
- Population: 56,485

District 113 elects one member of the Georgia House of Representatives. It contains parts of Newton County.

== Members ==
- Chuck Williams (until 2013)
- Pam Dickerson (2013–2021)
- Sharon Henderson (since 2021)
