= Georgia's 22nd House of Representatives district =

State district in Georgia, USA

Georgia's 22nd State House of Representatives district
Representative
Jordan Ridley; R–Woodstock
- Demographics: 79.8% White; 3.4% Black; 10.8% Hispanic; 3.7% Asian
- Population: 61,563

District 22 elects one member of the Georgia House of Representatives. It contains parts of Cherokee County and Cobb County.

== Members ==
- Calvin Hill (until 2013)
- Wes Cantrell (2015–2023)
- Jordan Ridley (since 2023)
