= Georgia's 153rd House of Representatives district =

State district in Georgia, USA

Georgia's 153rd State House of Representatives district
Representative
David Sampson; D–Albany
- Demographics: 29.2% White; 65.0% Black; 2.7% Hispanic; 1.2% Asian
- Population: 53,032

District 153 elects one member of the Georgia House of Representatives. It contains parts of Dougherty County.

== Members ==
- Carol Fullerton (2013– 2015)
- Darrel Ealum (2015–2019)
- CaMia Hopson (2019–2023)
- David Sampson (since 2023)
