= Georgia's 66th House of Representatives district =

State district in Georgia, USA

Georgia's 66th State House of Representatives district
Representative
Kimberly Alexander; D–Hiram
- Demographics: 42.3% White; 47.7% Black; 6.7% Hispanic; 1.9% Asian
- Population: 56,251

District 66 elects one member of the Georgia House of Representatives. It contains parts of Douglas County.

== Members ==
- Bob Snelling (until 2013)
- Kimberly Alexander (since 2013)
