= Georgia's 78th House of Representatives district =

State district in Georgia, USA

Georgia's 78th State House of Representatives district
Representative
Demetrius Douglas; D–Stockbridge
- Demographics: 22.2% White; 59.3% Black; 9.8% Hispanic; 5.2% Asian
- Population: 53,434

District 78 elects one member of the Georgia House of Representatives. It contains parts of Clayton County and Henry County.

== Members ==
- Glenn Baker (until 2013)
- Demetrius Douglas (since 2013)
