= Georgia's 154th House of Representatives district =

State district in Georgia, USA

Georgia's 154th State House of Representatives district
Representative
Gerald Greene; R–Cuthbert
- Demographics: 34.6% White; 61.4% Black; 2.0% Hispanic; 0.4% Asian
- Population: 52,377

District 154 elects one member of the Georgia House of Representatives. It contains the entirety of Baker County, Calhoun County, Clay County, Early County, Miller County, Randolph County, Seminole County and Quitman County, as well as parts of Dougherty County.

== Members ==
- Winfred Dukes (2013–2023)
- Gerald Greene (since 2023)

== 2026 Election Controversy ==
This district was in the national spotlight after the November 3rd, 2026 election. The preliminary tally showed that incumbent Republican Gerald Greene was trailing Democratic challenger, Harry James, by fewer than 100 votes. After it was detected that 388 more voters checked in than ballots counted, a search was triggered for a missing memory card. After the card was found and uploaded to Seminole County's election management system, the outcome flipped in favor of the Greene. Georgia Secretary of State Brad Raffensperger launched an investigation.
