= Doug Weathers =

William Douglas Weathers (born September 22, 1931) is a television journalist in Savannah, Georgia, USA, and the former WTOC-TV news presenter and news director. He presented his last broadcast on May 23, 2001.

Weathers was born in Marianna, Florida.

== Military career ==
According to a biography provided by WTOC-TV, Weathers served in the United States Army during the Korean War, after which he re-enlisted and was ordered to Hunter Army Airfield in Savannah in 1954.

== Broadcasting career ==
He began working for WTOC-TV in the station's launch in 1954 as a film editor. He worked his way up to running the projector, operating the studio cameras and helping with the production of the news broadcast.

In 1962, he was promoted to news director and presenter.

He left WTOC-TV to present the news at WJCL-TV in 1973 when WJCL-TV gained the ability to broadcast in color.

WJCL was, at the time, last in the 6 o'clock news ratings. With Weathers on the news desk, it leapt to number 1 and stayed at, or near, the top until WTOC hired Weathers back in 1979.

He was head of news and public affairs and presenter of WTOC The News at Six until his retirement in 2001.

== Broadcast style ==
Weathers' style changed little over the years. He never abandoned his down-home approach to the news often featuring "hokey" stories about farmers and their giant vegetables or anglers with really big fish. Viewers claimed it was part of his appeal. His popularity never flagged and WTOC's newscasts remained firmly atop the local ratings.
