= Georgia's 155th House of Representatives district =

State district in Georgia, USA

Georgia's 155th State House of Representatives district
Representative
Matt Hatchett; R–Dublin
- Demographics: 63.6% White; 29.0% Black; 5.0% Hispanic; 0.6% Asian
- Population: 54,170

District 155 elects one member of the Georgia House of Representatives. It contains the entirety of Johnson County and Laurens County.

== Members ==
- Clay Pirkle (2015–2023)
- Matt Hatchett (since 2023)
