= Georgia's 161st House of Representatives district =

State district in Georgia, USA

Georgia's 161st State House of Representatives district
Representative
Bill Hitchens; R–Rincon
- Demographics: 69.0% White; 20.9% Black; 5.1% Hispanic; 1.9% Asian
- Population: 61,782

District 161 elects one member of the Georgia House of Representatives. It contains parts of Chatham County and Effingham County.

== Members ==
- Bill Hitchens (since 2013)
