= Gerald Greene =

American politician (born 1948)

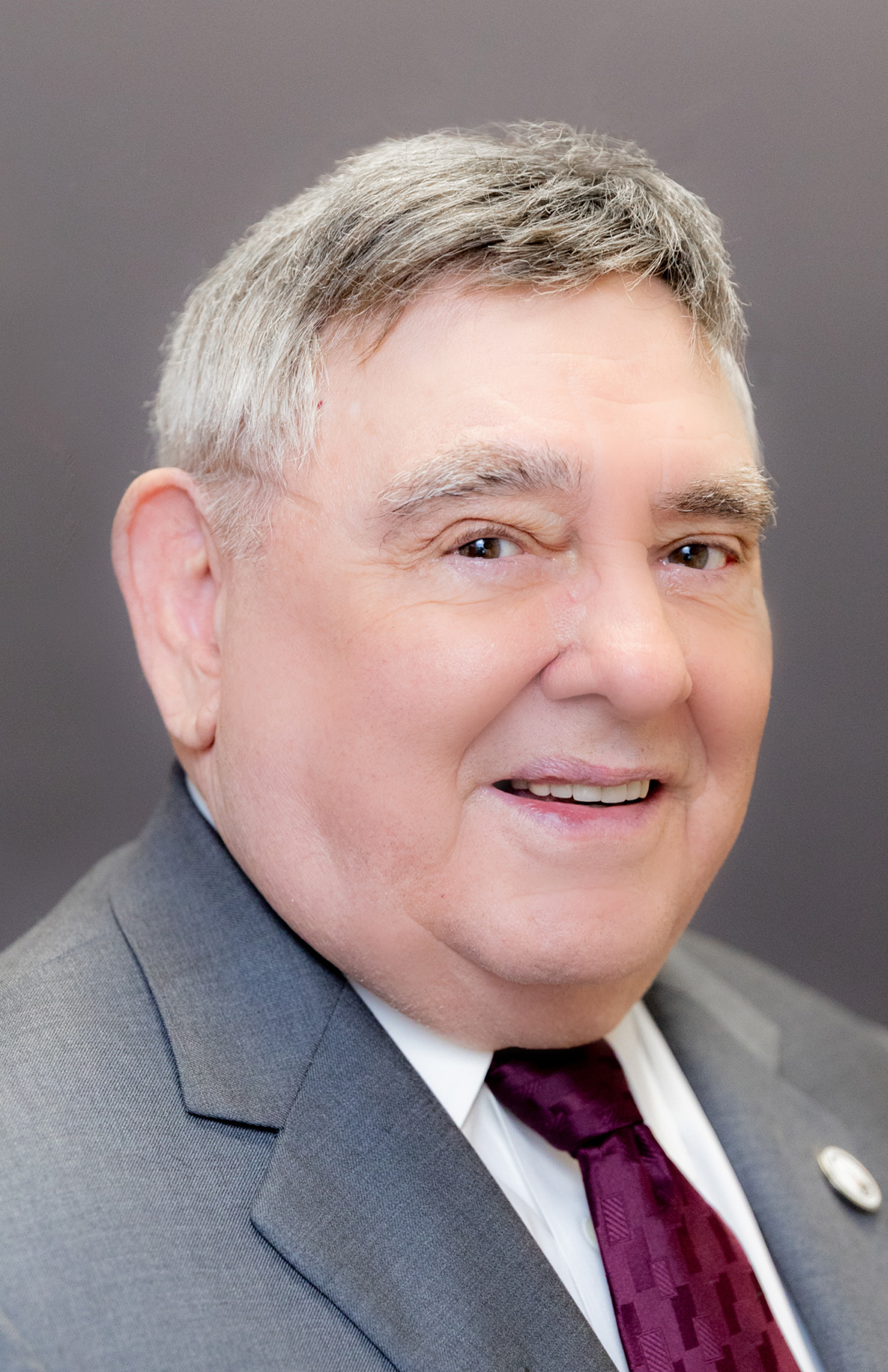
- Official portrait, 2025

Member of the Georgia House of Representatives
- Incumbent
- Assumed office January 10, 1983
- Constituency: 130th district (1983–1993); 158th district (1993–2003); 134th district (2003–2005); 149th district (2005–2013); 151st district (2013–2023); 154th district (2023–present)

Personal details
- Born: Gerald Edward Greene; January 20, 1948 (age 78)
- Party: Republican (2010–present)
- Other political affiliations: Democratic (before 2010)
- Education: Andrew College; Georgia Southern University (BA); University of Georgia (MEd); Georgia Southwestern State University (MA)
- Committees: State Properties

Gerald Edward Greene (born January 20, 1948) is an American politician from the state of Georgia. He represents the 154th District of the Georgia House of Representatives. In 2026 a voting machine memory card was found with many votes for him, overcoming his vote deficit to Harry James. Events involving the memory card are being investigated.

Greene was first elected to the Georgia House in 1982. He was shot in the parking lot of an adult entertainment store on January 26, 2017, while carrying thousands of dollars of storm relief funds.

In 2022, he was endorsed by the Georgia Association of Educators.

He was named the second most effective lawmaker in the state house during the 2023–24 legislative session by the Center for Effective Lawmaking.
