= Georgia House of Representatives =

Lower house of the Georgia General Assembly

Coordinates: 33.749070°N 84.388362°W

- Georgia General Assembly

Type
- Type: Lower house of the Georgia General Assembly
- Term limits: None

History
- New session started: January 13, 2025

Leadership
- Speaker: Jon G. Burns (R) since January 9, 2023
- Speaker pro tempore: Jan Jones (R) since January 11, 2010
- Majority Leader: Chuck Efstration (R) since January 9, 2023
- Minority Leader: Carolyn Hugley (D) since January 13, 2025

Structure
- Seats: 180
- Political groups: Majority: Republican (99); Minority: Democratic (81)
- Length of term: 2 years
- Authority: Article III, Georgia Constitution
- Salary: $23,341.72/year + per diem

Elections
- Last election: November 5, 2024
- Next election: November 3, 2026
- Redistricting: Legislative control

Meeting place
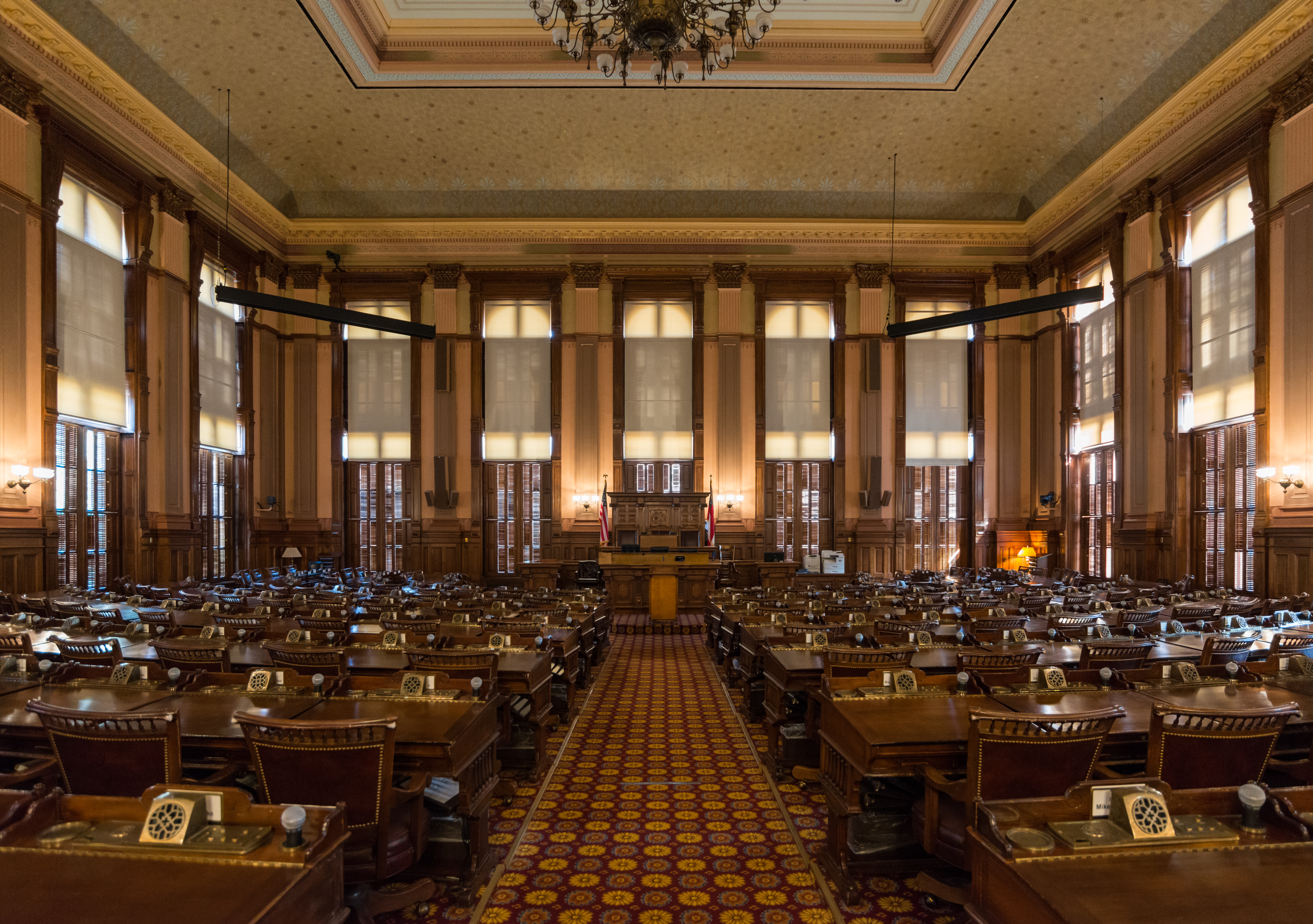
- House of Representatives Chamber; Georgia State Capitol; Atlanta, Georgia

Website
- legis.ga.gov/house

The Georgia House of Representatives is the lower house of the Georgia General Assembly (the state legislature) of the U.S. state of Georgia. There are currently 180 elected members. Republicans have had a majority in the chamber since 2005. The current House Speaker is Jon G. Burns.

== History ==
The Georgia House of Representatives was created in 1777 (249 years ago) during the American Revolution, making it older than the U.S. Congress. During its existence, its meeting place has moved multiple times, from Savannah to Augusta, to Louisville, to Milledgeville and finally to Atlanta in 1868.

In 1867, the military governor of Georgia called for an assembly in Atlanta to discuss a constitutional convention. Atlanta officials moved to make the city Georgia's new state capital, donating the location of Atlanta's first city hall. The constitutional convention agreed and the people voted to ratify the decision on April 20, 1868. The Georgia General Assembly first presided in Atlanta on July 4, 1868.

On October 26, 1884, construction began on a new state capitol and was first occupied on June 15, 1889.

== Powers and privileges ==
The state constitution gives the state legislature the power to make state laws, restrict land use to protect and preserve the environment and natural resources, form a state militia under the command of the governor of Georgia, expend public money, condemn property, zone property, participate in tourism, and control and regulate outdoor advertising.

The state legislature cannot grant incorporation to private persons but may establish laws governing the incorporation process. It is also prohibited from authorizing contracts or agreements that may have the effect of or the intent of lessening competition or encouraging a monopoly.

=== Privileges ===
Members of the Georgia House of Representatives maintain two privileges during their time in office. First, no member can be arrested during session or during committee meetings except in cases of treason, felony, or "breach of the peace". Second, members are not liable for anything they might say in session or committee meetings.

== Composition ==
Map of current partisan composition of legislative districts for the House of Representatives: Democratic representative Republican representative Vacant

According to the Georgia Constitution of 1983, this body is to comprise no fewer than 180 members elected for two-year terms. Current state law provides for 180 members. Elections are held the first Tuesday after the first Monday in November in even-numbered years.

It is the third-largest lower house of the 50 United States (behind New Hampshire (400) and Pennsylvania (203)). Republicans currently have a majority, though Democrats have gained seats in recent elections.

| Affiliation | Party (Shading indicates majority caucus) | | Total | Vacant |
| Affiliation | Republican | Democratic | Total | Vacant |
|---|---|---|---|---|
| End of 155th General Assembly | 105 | 74 | 179 | 1 (Note: Rep. Pam Stephenson resigned on September 10, 2020 and remained on the ballot in the 2020 general election unopposed. The seat is still vacant at the beginning of the 156th General Assembly pending a special election.) |
| End of 156th General Assembly | 103 | 76 | 179 | 1 |
| Beginning of 157th General Assembly | 101 | 79 | 180 | 0 |
| End 157th | 102 | 78 | 180 | 0 |
| Beginning of 158th General Assembly | 100 | 80 | 180 | 0 |
| September 4, 2025 (Note: Democrat Shelly Hutchinson (District 106) resigned.) | 100 | 79 | 179 | 1 |
| October 12, 2025 (Note: Republican Mandi Ballinger (District 23) died on October 12, 2025.) | 99 | 79 | 178 | 2 |
| October 28, 2025 (Note: Republican Marcus Wiedower (District 121) resigned.) | 98 | 79 | 177 | 3 |
| December 2, 2025 (Note: Democrat Akbar Ali elected to succeed Hutchinson.) | 98 | 80 | 178 | 2 |
| December 9, 2025 (Note: Democrat Eric Gisler elected to succeed Wiedower.) | 98 | 81 | 179 | 1 |
| January 1, 2026 (Note: Democrat Karen Bennett (District 94) resigned.) | 98 | 80 | 178 | 2 |
| January 5, 2026 (Note: Democrat Lynn Heffner (District 130) resigned.) | 98 | 79 | 177 | 3 |
| January 6, 2026 (Note: Republican Bill Fincher elected to succeed Ballinger.) | 99 | 79 | 178 | 2 |
| March 9, 2026 (Note: Democrat Dexter Sharper (District 177) resigned after being charged with fraud for actions during the COVID-19 pandemic.) | 99 | 78 | 177 | 3 |
| April 7, 2026 (Note: Democrats Venola Mason and Sheila Nelson elected to succeed Bennett and Heffner.) | 99 | 80 | 179 | 1 |
| June 9, 2026 (Note: Democrat Alvin Payton elected to succeed Sharper.) | 99 | 81 | 180 | 0 |
| Latest voting share | 55% | 45% | | |

== Officers ==
The House of Representatives elects its own speaker as well as a speaker pro tempore. Speaker Jon G. Burns was elected on January 9, 2023. Speaker Pro Tempore Jan Jones, who served as speaker following the death of Speaker David Ralston, was reelected to her previous position on that day as well. The speaker pro tempore becomes speaker in case of the death, resignation, or permanent disability of the speaker. The speaker pro tempore serves until a new speaker is elected. In addition there is a clerk of the House, who is charged with overseeing the flow of legislation through the body. The current clerk is William L. Reilly.

| Office | Representative | Party |
|---|---|---|
| Speaker of the House | Jon Burns | Republican |
| Speaker pro tempore | Jan Jones | Republican |
| Majority Leader | Chuck Efstration | Republican |
| Majority Whip | James Burchett | Republican |
| Majority Caucus Chairman | Bruce Williamson | Republican |
| Majority Caucus Vice-Chairman | Houston Gaines | Republican |
| Majority Caucus Secretary/Treasurer | Ginny Ehrhart | Republican |
| Majority Caucus Chief Deputy Whip | Rob Leverett | Republican |
| Minority Leader | Carolyn Hugley | Democratic |
| Minority Whip | Sam Park | Democratic |
| Minority Caucus Chairman | Tanya Miller | Democratic |
| Minority Caucus Vice-Chairman | Spencer Frye | Democratic |
| Minority Caucus Secretary | Park Cannon | Democratic |
| Minority Caucus Treasurer | Solomon Adesanya | Democratic |
| Minority Caucus Chief Deputy Whip | Saira Draper | Democratic |

== Membership ==
=== List of current representatives ===
As of June 2026, the membership of the House is as follows:

| District | Name | Party | Start | Residence | Counties |
|---|---|---|---|---|---|
| 1 | Mike Cameron | Republican | 2021 | Rossville | Dade, part of Walker |
| 2 | Steve Tarvin | Republican | 2014 | Chickamauga | Parts of Catoosa, Walker, and Whitfield |
| 3 | Mitchell Horner | Republican | 2023 | Ringgold | Part of Catoosa |
| 4 | Kasey Carpenter | Republican | 2017 | Dalton | Part of Whitfield |
| 5 | Matt Barton | Republican | 2019 | Calhoun | Parts of Floyd and Gordon |
| 6 | Jason Ridley | Republican | 2017 | Chatsworth | Murray, parts of Gordon and Whitfield |
| 7 | Johnny Chastain | Republican | 2023 | Blue Ridge | Fannin, Gilmer, part of Dawson |
| 8 | Stan Gunter | Republican | 2021 | Blairsville | Towns, Union, part of White |
| 9 | Will Wade | Republican | 2021 | Dawsonville | Parts of Dawson, Lumpkin, and White |
| 10 | Victor Anderson | Republican | 2021 | Cornelia | Rabun, part of Habersham |
| 11 | Rick Jasperse | Republican | 2010 | Jasper | Pickens, parts of Cherokee and Forsyth |
| 12 | Eddie Lumsden | Republican | 2013 | Armuchee | Chattooga, part of Floyd |
| 13 | Katie Dempsey | Republican | 2007 | Rome | Part of Floyd |
| 14 | Mitchell Scoggins | Republican | 2019 | Cartersville | Parts of Bartow and Cherokee |
| 15 | Matthew Gambill | Republican | 2019 | Cartersville | Part of Bartow |
| 16 | Trey Kelley | Republican | 2013 | Cedartown | Polk, part of Paulding |
| 17 | Martin Momtahan | Republican | 2019 | Dallas | Part of Paulding |
| 18 | Tyler Smith | Republican | 2021 | Bremen | Haralson, parts of Carroll and Paulding |
| 19 | Joseph Gullett | Republican | 2019 | Dallas | Parts of Cobb and Paulding |
| 20 | Charlice Byrd | Republican | 2021 | Woodstock | Part of Cherokee |
| 21 | Brad Thomas | Republican | 2021 | Holly Springs | Part of Cherokee |
| 22 | Jordan Ridley | Republican | 2023 | Woodstock | Parts of Cherokee and Cobb |
| 23 | Bill Fincher | Republican | 2026 | Canton | Part of Cherokee |
| 24 | Carter Barrett | Republican | 2023 | Cumming | Part of Forsyth |
| 25 | Todd Jones | Republican | 2017 | Cumming | Parts of Forsyth and Fulton |
| 26 | Lauren McDonald | Republican | 2021 | Cumming | Part of Forsyth |
| 27 | Lee Hawkins | Republican | 2013 | Gainesville | Parts of Hall and Lumpkin |
| 28 | Brent Cox | Republican | 2023 | Dawsonville | Parts of Forsyth and Hall |
| 29 | Matt Dubnik | Republican | 2017 | Gainesville | Part of Hall |
| 30 | Derrick McCollum | Republican | 2023 | Chestnut Mountain | Parts of Gwinnett and Hall |
| 31 | Emory Dunahoo | Republican | 2011 | Gillsville | Parts of Hall and Jackson |
| 32 | Chris Erwin | Republican | 2019 | Homer | Banks, Stephens, parts of Habersham and Jackson |
| 33 | Alan Powell | Republican | 1991 | Hartwell | Franklin, Hart, part of Madison |
| 34 | Devan Seabaugh | Republican | 2021 | Marietta | Part of Cobb |
| 35 | Lisa Campbell | Democratic | 2023 | Kennesaw | Part of Cobb |
| 36 | Ginny Ehrhart | Republican | 2019 | Powder Springs | Part of Cobb |
| 37 | Mary Frances Williams | Democratic | 2019 | Marietta | Part of Cobb |
| 38 | David Wilkerson | Democratic | 2011 | Powder Springs | Part of Cobb |
| 39 | Terry Cummings | Democratic | 2023 | Mableton | Part of Cobb |
| 40 | Kimberly New | Republican | 2023 | Villa Rica | Parts of Douglas and Paulding |
| 41 | Michael Smith | Democratic | 2013 | Marietta | Part of Cobb |
| 42 | Gabriel Sanchez | Democratic | 2025 | Smyrna | Part of Cobb |
| 43 | Solomon Adesanya | Democratic | 2023 | Marietta | Part of Cobb |
| 44 | Don Parsons | Republican | 1995 | Marietta | Parts of Cherokee and Cobb |
| 45 | Sharon Cooper | Republican | 1997 | Marietta | Part of Cobb |
| 46 | John Carson | Republican | 2011 | Marietta | Parts of Cherokee and Cobb |
| 47 | Jan Jones | Republican | 2003 | Milton | Parts of Cherokee and Fulton |
| 48 | Scott Hilton | Republican | 2023 | Peachtree Corners | Parts of Fulton and Gwinnett |
| 49 | Chuck Martin | Republican | 2003 | Alpharetta | Part of Fulton |
| 50 | Michelle Au | Democratic | 2023 | Johns Creek | Part of Fulton |
| 51 | Esther Panitch | Democratic | 2023 | Sandy Springs | Part of Fulton |
| 52 | Shea Roberts | Democratic | 2021 | Atlanta | Parts of DeKalb and Fulton |
| 53 | Deborah Silcox | Republican | 2023 | Sandy Springs | Part of Fulton |
| 54 | Betsy Holland | Democratic | 2019 | Atlanta | Part of Fulton |
| 55 | Inga Willis | Democratic | 2023 | Atlanta | Part of Fulton |
| 56 | Bryce Berry | Democratic | 2025 | Atlanta | Part of Fulton |
| 57 | Stacey Evans | Democratic | 2021 | Atlanta | Part of Fulton |
| 58 | Park Cannon | Democratic | 2016 | Atlanta | Part of Fulton |
| 59 | Phil Olaleye | Democratic | 2023 | Atlanta | Part of Fulton |
| 60 | Sheila Jones | Democratic | 2005 | Atlanta | Parts of Cobb and Fulton |
| 61 | Mekyah McQueen | Democratic | 2025 | Smyrna | Parts of Cobb and Fulton |
| 62 | Tanya F. Miller | Democratic | 2023 | Atlanta | Part of Fulton |
| 63 | Kim Schofield | Democratic | 2017 | Atlanta | Part of Fulton |
| 64 | Sylvia Wayfer Baker | Democratic | 2025 | Douglasville | Part of Douglas |
| 65 | Robert Dawson | Democratic | 2025 | Atlanta | Parts of Coweta and Fulton |
| 66 | Kimberly Alexander | Democratic | 2013 | Hiram | Part of Douglas |
| 67 | Lydia Glaize | Democratic | 2023 | Fairburn | Parts of Coweta and Fulton |
| 68 | Derrick Jackson | Democratic | 2023 | Tyrone | Parts of Fayette and Fulton |
| 69 | Debra Bazemore | Democratic | 2017 | South Fulton | Parts of Fayette and Fulton |
| 70 | Lynn Smith | Republican | 1997 | Newnan | Parts of Carroll and Coweta |
| 71 | Justin Howard | Republican | 2025 | Carrollton | Part of Carroll |
| 72 | David Huddleston | Republican | 2023 | Roopville | Heard, parts of Carroll and Troup |
| 73 | Josh Bonner | Republican | 2017 | Fayetteville | Parts of Coweta and Fayette |
| 74 | Robert Flournoy | Democratic | 2025 | Hampton | Parts of Clayton and Henry |
| 75 | Eric Bell II | Democratic | 2023 | Jonesboro | Part of Clayton |
| 76 | Sandra Scott | Democratic | 2011 | Rex | Part of Clayton |
| 77 | Rhonda Burnough | Democratic | 2017 | Riverdale | Part of Clayton |
| 78 | Demetrius Douglas | Democratic | 2013 | Stockbridge | Parts of Clayton and Henry |
| 79 | Yasmin Neal | Democratic | 2021 | Jonesboro | Part of Clayton |
| 80 | Long Tran | Democratic | 2023 | Dunwoody | Part of DeKalb |
| 81 | Noelle Kahaian | Republican | 2025 | Locust Grove | Part of Henry |
| 82 | Karen Mathiak | Republican | 2017 | Griffin | Parts of Fayette and Spalding |
| 83 | Karen Lupton | Democratic | 2023 | Chamblee | Part of DeKalb |
| 84 | Mary Margaret Oliver | Democratic | 2003 | Decatur | Part of DeKalb |
| 85 | Karla Drenner | Democratic | 2001 | Avondale Estates | Part of DeKalb |
| 86 | Imani Barnes | Democratic | 2023 | Tucker | Part of DeKalb |
| 87 | Viola Davis | Democratic | 2019 | Stone Mountain | Part of DeKalb |
| 88 | Billy Mitchell | Democratic | 2003 | Stone Mountain | Parts of DeKalb and Gwinnett |
| 89 | Omari Crawford | Democratic | 2023 | Decatur | Part of DeKalb |
| 90 | Saira Draper | Democratic | 2023 | Atlanta | Part of DeKalb |
| 91 | Angela Moore | Democratic | 2021 | Stonecrest | Parts of DeKalb and Rockdale |
| 92 | Rhonda Taylor | Democratic | 2021 | Conyers | Part of Rockdale |
| 93 | Doreen Carter | Democratic | 2015 | Lithonia | Parts of DeKalb, Gwinnett and Rockdale |
| 94 | Venola Mason | Democratic | 2026 | | Parts of DeKalb and Gwinnett |
| 95 | Dar'shun Kendrick | Democratic | 2011 | Lithonia | Parts of DeKalb and Gwinnett |
| 96 | Arlene Beckles | Democratic | 2025 | Norcross | Part of Gwinnett |
| 97 | Ruwa Romman | Democratic | 2023 | Duluth | Part of Gwinnett |
| 98 | Marvin Lim | Democratic | 2021 | Norcross | Part of Gwinnett |
| 99 | Matt Reeves | Republican | 2023 | Duluth | Part of Gwinnett |
| 100 | David Clark | Republican | 2015 | Buford | Parts of Forsyth, Gwinnett, and Hall |
| 101 | Scott Holcomb | Democratic | 2011 | Atlanta | Part of DeKalb |
| 102 | Gabe Okoye | Democratic | 2023 | Lawrenceville | Part of Gwinnett |
| 103 | Soo Hong | Republican | 2023 | Lawrenceville | Parts of Gwinnett and Hall |
| 104 | Chuck Efstration | Republican | 2013 | Mulberry | Parts of Barrow and Gwinnett |
| 105 | Sandy Donatucci | Republican | 2025 | Buford | Part of Gwinnett |
| 106 | Akbar Ali | Democratic | 2025 | | Part of Gwinnett |
| 107 | Sam Park | Democratic | 2017 | Lawrenceville | Part of Gwinnett |
| 108 | Jasmine Clark | Democratic | 2019 | Lilburn | Part of Gwinnett |
| 109 | Dewey McClain | Democratic | 2013 | Lawrenceville | Part of Gwinnett |
| 110 | Segun Adeyina | Democratic | 2023 | Grayson | Part of Gwinnett |
| 111 | Reynaldo Martinez | Republican | 2023 | Loganville | Parts of Gwinnett and Walton |
| 112 | Bruce Williamson | Republican | 2011 | Monroe | Parts of Gwinnett and Walton |
| 113 | Sharon Henderson (Note: Democrat Sharon Henderson (District 113) was suspended from the House by Governor Brian Kemp on January 22nd, 2026.) | Democratic | 2021 | Covington | Part of Newton |
| 114 | Tim Fleming | Republican | 2023 | Covington | Morgan, parts of Newton and Walton |
| 115 | Regina Lewis-Ward | Democratic | 2021 | McDonough | Parts of DeKalb and Henry |
| 116 | El-Mahdi Holly | Democratic | 2019 | Stockbridge | Parts of DeKalb and Henry |
| 117 | Mary Ann Santos | Democratic | 2025 | McDonough | Part of Henry |
| 118 | Clint Crowe | Republican | 2021 | Jackson | Butts, parts of Monroe and Newton |
| 119 | Holt Persinger | Republican | 2023 | Winder | Parts of Barrow and Jackson |
| 120 | Houston Gaines | Republican | 2019 | Athens | Parts of Barrow, Clarke, Jackson, and Oconee |
| 121 | Eric Gisler | Democratic | 2026 | Watkinsville | Parts of Clarke and Oconee |
| 122 | Spencer Frye | Democratic | 2013 | Athens | Part of Clarke |
| 123 | Rob Leverett | Republican | 2021 | Elberton | Elbert, Lincoln, Wilkes, parts of Columbia and Madison |
| 124 | Trey Rhodes | Republican | 2015 | Greensboro | Greene, Oglethorpe, Taliaferro, parts of Clarke and Putnam |
| 125 | Gary Richardson | Republican | 2024 | Evans | Parts of Columbia and McDuffie |
| 126 | L. C. Myles | Democratic | 2025 | Hephzibah | Burke, Jenkins, part of Richmond |
| 127 | Mark Newton | Republican | 2017 | Augusta | Parts of Columbia and Richmond |
| 128 | Mack Jackson | Democratic | 2009 | Sandersville | Glascock, Hancock, Warren, Washington, parts of Baldwin and McDuffie |
| 129 | Karlton Howard | Democratic | 2023 | Augusta | Part of Richmond |
| 130 | Sheila Nelson | Democratic | 2026 | Augusta | Part of Richmond |
| 131 | Rob Clifton | Republican | 2025 | Evans | Part of Columbia |
| 132 | Brian Prince | Democratic | 2013 | Augusta | Jefferson, part of Richmond |
| 133 | Danny Mathis | Republican | 2019 | Cochran | Bleckley, Dodge, Twiggs, Wilkinson, part of Telfair |
| 134 | Robert Dickey | Republican | 2011 | Musella | Crawford, Upson, parts of Lamar and Peach |
| 135 | Beth Camp | Republican | 2021 | Concord | Pike, parts of Lamar and Spalding |
| 136 | David Jenkins | Republican | 2021 | Grantville | Parts of Coweta, Meriwether, and Troup |
| 137 | Debbie Buckner | Democratic | 2003 | Junction City | Talbot, parts of Meriwether, Muscogee, and Troup |
| 138 | Vance Smith | Republican | 2019 | Pine Mountain | Parts of Harris, Muscogee, and Troup |
| 139 | Carmen Rice | Republican | 2024 | Columbus | Parts of Harris and Muscogee |
| 140 | Tremaine Teddy Reese | Democratic | 2023 | Columbus | Part of Muscogee |
| 141 | Carolyn Hugley | Democratic | 1993 | Columbus | Part of Muscogee |
| 142 | Miriam Paris | Democratic | 2017 | Macon | Part of Bibb |
| 143 | Anissa Jones | Democratic | 2025 | Macon | Parts of Bibb and Houston |
| 144 | Dale Washburn | Republican | 2019 | Macon | Jasper, parts of Bibb, Jones, Monroe, and Putnam |
| 145 | Tangie Herring | Democratic | 2025 | Macon | Parts of Bibb and Monroe |
| 146 | Shaw Blackmon | Republican | 2015 | Bonaire | Part of Houston |
| 147 | Bethany Ballard | Republican | 2023 | Warner Robins | Parts of Houston and Peach |
| 148 | Noel Williams Jr. | Republican | 2019 | Cordele | Crisp, Pulaski, Wilcox, parts of Ben Hill and Houston |
| 149 | Floyd Griffin | Democratic | 2025 | Milledgeville | Parts of Baldwin, Bibb, and Jones |
| 150 | Patty Marie Stinson | Democratic | 2013 | Butler | Dooly, Macon, Taylor, parts of Peach and Sumter |
| 151 | Mike Cheokas | Republican | 2019 | Americus | Chattahoochee, Marion, Schley, Stewart, Terrell, Webster, parts of Dougherty and Sumter |
| 152 | Bill Yearta | Republican | 2019 | Sylvester | Lee, Worth, part of Dougherty |
| 153 | David Sampson | Democratic | 2023 | Albany | Part of Dougherty |
| 154 | Gerald Greene | Republican | 1983 | Cuthbert | Baker, Calhoun, Clay, Early, Miller, Randolph, Seminole, Quitman, part of Dougherty |
| 155 | Matt Hatchett | Republican | 2011 | Dublin | Johnson, Laurens |
| 156 | Leesa Hagan | Republican | 2021 | Lyons | Montgomery, Toombs, Wheeler, parts of Ben Hill, Tattnall, and Telfair |
| 157 | Bill Werkheiser | Republican | 2015 | Glennville | Evans, Jeff Davis, parts of Appling and Tattnall |
| 158 | Butch Parrish | Republican | 1985 | Swainsboro | Candler, Emanuel, Treutlen, part of Bulloch |
| 159 | Jon G. Burns | Republican | 2005 | Newington | Screven, parts of Bulloch and Effingham |
| 160 | Lehman Franklin | Republican | 2023 | Statesboro | Parts of Bryan and Bulloch |
| 161 | Bill Hitchens | Republican | 2013 | Rincon | Parts of Chatham and Effingham |
| 162 | Carl Gilliard | Democratic | 2016 | Savannah | Part of Chatham |
| 163 | Anne Allen Westbrook | Democratic | 2023 | Savannah | Part of Chatham |
| 164 | Ron Stephens | Republican | 1997 | Savannah | Parts of Bryan and Chatham |
| 165 | Edna Jackson | Democratic | 2021 | Savannah | Part of Chatham |
| 166 | Jesse Petrea | Republican | 2015 | Savannah | Parts of Bryan and Chatham |
| 167 | Buddy DeLoach | Republican | 2021 | Townsend | Long, McIntosh, parts of Glynn, Liberty, and Wayne |
| 168 | Al Williams | Democratic | 2003 | Midway | Part of Liberty |
| 169 | Angie O'Steen | Republican | 2025 | Ambrose | Irwin, Turner, parts of Coffee and Tift |
| 170 | Jaclyn Ford | Republican | 2025 | Tifton | Berrien, parts of Cook and Tift |
| 171 | Joe Campbell | Republican | 2020 | Camilla | Decatur, Mitchell, part of Grady |
| 172 | Charles Cannon | Republican | 2023 | Moultrie | Colquitt, parts of Cook and Thomas |
| 173 | Darlene Taylor | Republican | 2011 | Thomasville | Parts of Grady and Thomas |
| 174 | John Corbett | Republican | 2015 | Lake Park | Brantley, Charlton, Clinch, Echols, parts of Lowndes and Ware |
| 175 | John LaHood | Republican | 2018 | Valdosta | Brooks, part of Lowndes |
| 176 | James Burchett | Republican | 2019 | Waycross | Atkinson, Lanier, parts of Coffee, Lowndes, and Ware |
| 177 | Alvin Payton | Democratic | 2026 | Valdosta | Part of Lowndes |
| 178 | Steven Meeks | Republican | 2019 | Screven | Bacon, Pierce, parts of Appling and Wayne |
| 179 | Rick Townsend | Republican | 2023 | Brunswick | Part of Glynn |
| 180 | Steven Sainz | Republican | 2019 | St. Marys | Camden, part of Glynn |

=== Session history ===
| Election | Election map (Note: Results of preceding election, not including party switches or special elections.) | Speaker | Session dates | Composition (Note: At beginning of session.) | | |
| Election | Election map | Speaker | Session dates | D | R | I |
|---|---|---|---|---|---|---|
| 2002 | | Terry Coleman (D) | January 13, 2003 – April 25, 2003 | 107 | 72 | 1 |
| 2002 | | Terry Coleman (D) | January 12, 2004 – April 7, 2004 | 107 | 72 | 1 |
| 2004 | | Glenn Richardson (R) | January 10, 2005 – March 31, 2005 | 79 | 100 | 1 |
| 2004 | | Glenn Richardson (R) | January 9, 2006 – March 30, 2006 | 78 | 101 | 1 |
| 2006 | | Glenn Richardson (R) | January 8, 2007 – April 16, 2007 | 74 | 106 | 0 |
| 2006 | | Glenn Richardson (R) | January 14, 2008 – April 4, 2008 | 74 | 106 | 0 |
| 2008 | | Glenn Richardson (R) | January 12, 2009 – April 3, 2009 | 75 | 105 | 0 |
| 2008 | | David Ralston (R) | January 11, 2010 – April 29, 2010 | 74 | 105 | 1 |
| 2010 | | David Ralston (R) | January 10, 2011 – April 14, 2011 | 63 | 116 | 1 |
| 2010 | | David Ralston (R) | January 9, 2012 – March 29, 2012 | 63 | 116 | 1 |
| 2012 | | David Ralston (R) | January 14, 2013 – March 28, 2013 | 60 | 119 | 1 |
| 2012 | | David Ralston (R) | January 13, 2014 – March 20, 2014 | 60 | 119 | 1 |
| 2014 | | David Ralston (R) | January 12, 2015 – April 2, 2015 | 60 | 119 | 1 |
| 2014 | | David Ralston (R) | January 11, 2016 – March 24, 2016 | 60 | 119 | 1 |
| 2016 | | David Ralston (R) | January 9, 2017 – March 31, 2017 | 62 | 118 | 0 |
| 2016 | | David Ralston (R) | January 8, 2018 – March 29, 2018 | 62 | 118 | 0 |
| 2018 | | David Ralston (R) | January 14, 2019 – April 2, 2019 | 74 | 106 | 0 |
| 2018 | | David Ralston (R) | January 13, 2020 – June 26, 2020 | 74 | 106 | 0 |
| 2020 | | David Ralston (R) | January 11, 2021 – March 31, 2021 | 77 | 103 | 0 |
| 2020 | | David Ralston (R) | January 10, 2022 – April 4, 2022 | 77 | 103 | 0 |
| 2022 | | Jon G. Burns (R) | January 9, 2023 – March 29, 2023 | 79 | 101 | 0 |
| 2022 | | Jon G. Burns (R) | January 8, 2024 – March 28, 2024 | 78 | 102 | 0 |
| 2024 | | Jon G. Burns (R) | January 13, 2025 – April 4, 2025 | 80 | 100 | 0 |

== Committees list ==
- Agriculture and Consumer Affairs
- Appropriations
- Banks and Banking
- Budget & Fiscal Affairs Oversight
- Code Revision
- Defense and Veterans Affairs
- Economic Development and Tourism
- Education
- Ethics
- Energy, Utilities & Telecommunications
- Game, Fish & Parks
- Governmental Affairs
- Health
- Higher Education
- Human Relations & Aging
- Industry and Labor
- Information and Audits
- Insurance
- Intergovernmental Coordination
- Interstate Cooperation
- Judiciary
- Judiciary Non-Civil
- Juvenile Justice
- MARTOC (Metropolitan Atlanta Rapid Transit Overview Committee)
- Motor Vehicles
- Natural Resources and Environment
- Public Health
- Public Safety and Homeland Security
- Reapportionment and Redistricting
- Regulated Industries
- Retirement
- Rules
- Small Business Development
- Special Committee on Healthcare
- Special Rules
- State Planning and Community Affairs
- State Properties
- Technology and Infrastructure Innovation
- Transportation
- Urban Affairs
- Ways and Means

== See also ==
- Georgia State Senate
- List of Georgia state legislatures
