= 2022 Georgia House of Representatives election =

- November 8, 2022

All 180 seats in the Georgia House of Representatives 91 seats needed for a majority
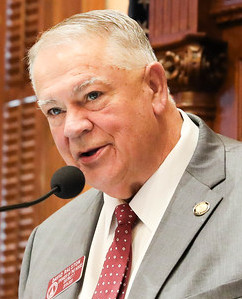

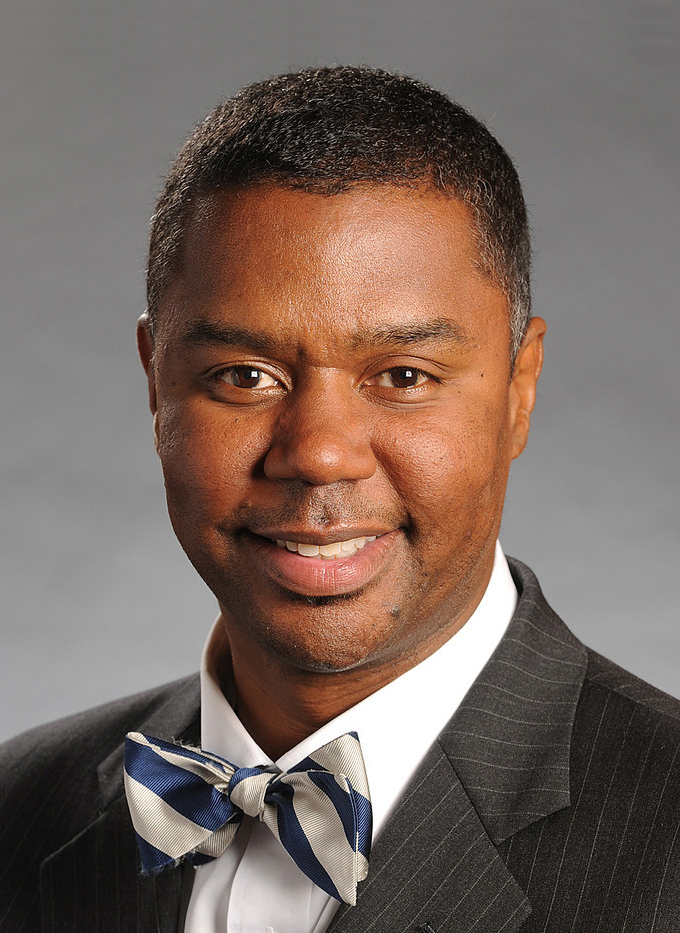
	Majority party	Minority party
Leader	David Ralston	James Beverly
Party	Republican	Democratic
Leader since	January 11, 2010	January 11, 2021
Leader's seat	7th - Ellijay	143rd - Macon
Last election	103	77
Seats won	101	79
Seat change	▼2	▲2
Popular vote	1,999,536	1,619,542
Percentage	55.25%	44.75%
Swing	▲3.94%	▼3.91%
- Republican hold Republican gain Democratic hold Democratic gain 50–60% 60–70% 70–80% 80–90% >90% 50–60% 60–70% 70–80% 80–90% >90%
Speaker before election
David Ralston
Republican
Elected Speaker
Jon Burns
Republican

The 2022 Georgia House of Representatives elections were held on November 8, 2022, as part of the biennial United States elections. The election coincided with elections for other offices including for governor, U.S Senate, U.S House, and State Senate. Georgia voters elected state representatives in all 180 of the state house's districts to the 157th Georgia General Assembly. State representatives serve two-year terms in the Georgia House of Representatives. The primary election was held on May 24, 2022, with a primary run-off held on June 21, 2022.

The Democrats gained two seats, decreasing the Republican majority to 101 out of 180 seats.

== Special elections ==
There were five special elections for the 156th Georgia General Assembly.

=== District 90 (special) ===
Representative Pam Stephenson resigned on September 10, 2020, due to dementia. Her name continued to be on the ballot for the general election and she won unopposed. A special election to elect her successor was held on February 9, 2021, with a runoff held on March 9, 2021. As Stephenson was elected without opposition in 2020, only a Democratic primary was held to fill her seat.

Georgia House of Representatives 90th district special election, 2021
Party	Candidate	Votes	%
Democratic	Stan Watson	849	28.23
Democratic	Angela Moore	510	16.96
Democratic	Joel Thibodeaux	460	15.29
Democratic	Greg Shealey	456	15.16
Democratic	Ed Williams	432	14.36
Democratic	Diandra Hines	301	10.00
Total votes		3,008	100.00

Georgia House of Representatives 90th district special election runoff, 2021
Party	Candidate	Votes	%
Democratic	Angela Moore	1,627	59.01
Democratic	Stan Watson	1,130	40.99
Total votes		2,757	100.00
Democratic hold			

=== District 34 (special) ===
Representative Bert Reeves resigned on April 30, 2021, to become Georgia Tech's Vice President of Institute Relations. A special election to elect his successor was held on June 15, 2021, with a runoff on July 13, 2021.

Georgia House of Representatives 34th district special election, 2021
Party	Candidate	Votes	%
Republican	Devan Seabaugh	3,339	47.10
Democratic	Priscilla Smith	1,741	24.56
Democratic	Sam Hensley Jr	1,116	15.74
Republican	David Blinkhorn	839	11.84
Libertarian	Chris Neill	54	0.76
Total votes		7,089	100.00

Georgia House of Representatives 34th district special election runoff, 2021
Party	Candidate	Votes	%
Republican	Devan Seabaugh	5,606	62.95
Democratic	Priscilla Smith	3,299	37.05
Total votes		8,905	100.00
Republican hold			

=== District 156 (special) ===
Representative Greg Morris resigned on April 13, 2021, to join the Georgia Department of Transportation Board. A special election to elect his successor was held on June 15, 2021, with a runoff on July 13, 2021.

Georgia House of Representatives 156th district special election, 2021
Party	Candidate	Votes	%
Republican	Leesa Hagan	2,068	43.07
Republican	Wally Sapp	2,031	42.30
Democratic	Wright Ges	702	14.63
Total votes		4,801	100.00

Georgia House of Representatives 156th district special election runoff, 2021
Party	Candidate	Votes	%
Republican	Leesa Hagan	3,131	51.69
Republican	Wally Sapp	2,926	48.31
Total votes		6,057	100.00
Republican hold			

=== District 165 (special) ===
Representative Mickey Stephens died on August 14, 2021. A special election to elect her successor was held on November 2, 2021.

Georgia House of Representatives 165th district special election, 2021
Party	Candidate	Votes	%
Democratic	Edna Jackson	2,743	53.25
Democratic	Antwan Lang	963	18.70
Libertarian	Clinton Cowart	802	15.57
Democratic	Clinton Young	442	8.58
Democratic	Sabrina E. Kent	201	3.90
Total votes		5,151	100.00
Democratic hold			

=== District 45 (special) ===
Representative Matt Dollar resigned on February 1, 2022, to become the Deputy Commissioner of Economic Development for the Technical College System of Georgia. A special election to elect his successor was held on April 5, 2022, with a runoff on May 3, 2022.

Georgia House of Representatives 45th district special election, 2022
Party	Candidate	Votes	%
Republican	Mitchell Kaye	2,274	41.61
Democratic	Dustin McCormick	2,212	40.48
Republican	Pamela Alayon	737	13.49
Republican	Darryl Wilson	242	4.42
Total votes		5,465	100.00

Georgia House of Representatives 45th district special election runoff, 2022
Party	Candidate	Votes	%
Republican	Mitchell Kaye	2,815	56.59
Democratic	Dustin McCormick	2,159	43.41
Total votes		4,974	100.00
Republican hold			

== Predictions ==
Source	Ranking	As of
Sabato's Crystal Ball	Likely R	May 19, 2022

== Results summary ==
† – Incumbent not seeking re-election

District	2020 Pres.	Incumbent			Candidates	Result
District	2020 Pres.	Member	Party	First elected	Candidates	Result
1	R +57.0	Mike Cameron	Republican	2020	▌ ✓ Mike Cameron (Republican)	Incumbent re-elected. Republican hold.
2	R +61.3	Steve Tarvin	Republican	2014	▌ ✓ Steve Tarvin (Republican)	Incumbent re-elected. Republican hold.
3	R +54.7	Dewayne Hill†	Republican	2016	▌ ✓ Mitchell Horner (Republican)	New member elected. Republican hold.
4	R +23.0	Kasey Carpenter	Republican	2017 (special)	▌ ✓ Kasey Carpenter (Republican)	Incumbent re-elected. Republican hold.
5	R +62.2	Matt Barton	Republican	2019 (special)	▌ ✓ Matt Barton (Republican)	Incumbent re-elected. Republican hold.
6	R +66.5	Jason Ridley	Republican	2016	▌ ✓ Jason Ridley (Republican)	Incumbent re-elected. Republican hold.
7	R +63.3	David Ralston	Republican	2002	▌ ✓ David Ralston (Republican)	Incumbent re-elected. Republican hold.
8	R +63.1	Stan Gunter	Republican	2020	▌ ✓ Stan Gunter (Republican); ▌ June Krise (Democratic)	Incumbent re-elected. Republican hold.
9	R +65.2	Will Wade	Republican	2020	▌ ✓ Will Wade (Republican)	Incumbent re-elected. Republican hold.
10	R +62.1	Victor Anderson	Republican	2020	▌ ✓ Victor Anderson (Republican)	Incumbent re-elected. Republican hold.
11	R +61.8	Rick Jasperse	Republican	2010 (special)	▌ ✓ Rick Jasperse (Republican); ▌ Kayla Hollifield (Democratic)	Incumbent re-elected. Republican hold.
12	R +60.4	Eddie Lumsden	Republican	2012	▌ ✓ Eddie Lumsden (Republican)	Incumbent re-elected. Republican hold.
13	R +28.9	Katie Dempsey	Republican	2006	▌ ✓ Katie Dempsey (Republican)	Incumbent re-elected. Republican hold.
14	R +60.8	Mitchell Scoggins	Republican	2018	▌ ✓ Mitchell Scoggins (Republican)	Incumbent re-elected. Republican hold.
15	R +42.2	Matthew Gambill	Republican	2018	▌ ✓ Matthew Gambill (Republican)	Incumbent re-elected. Republican hold.
16	R +54.8	Trey Kelley	Republican	2012	▌ ✓ Trey Kelley (Republican)	Incumbent re-elected. Republican hold.
17	R +28.2	Martin Momtahan	Republican	2018	▌ ✓ Martin Momtahan (Republican); ▌ Sunshine Marshall (Democratic)	Incumbent re-elected. Republican hold.
18	R +67.6	Tyler Smith	Republican	2020	▌ ✓ Tyler Smith (Republican); ▌ Pay Rhudy (Democratic)	Incumbent re-elected. Republican hold.
19	R +24.4	Joseph Gullett	Republican	2018	▌ ✓ Joseph Gullett (Republican); ▌ R.J. Coyle (Democratic)	Incumbent re-elected. Republican hold.
20	R +32.4	Charlice Byrd	Republican	2005; 2020	▌ ✓ Charlice Byrd (Republican)	Incumbent re-elected. Republican hold.
21	R +43.8	Brad Thomas	Republican	2020	▌ ✓ Brad Thomas (Republican)	Incumbent re-elected. Republican hold.
22	R +16.4	Wes Cantrell†	Republican	2014	▌ ✓ Jordan Ridley (Republican); ▌ Stacee Lashone Hill (Democratic)	New member elected. Republican hold.
23	R +48.0	Mandi Ballinger	Republican	2012	▌ ✓ Mandi Ballinger (Republican)	Incumbent re-elected. Republican hold.
24	R +25.1	Sheri Smallwood Gilligan	Republican	2015 (special)	▌ ✓ Carter Barrett (Republican); ▌ Sydney Walker (Democratic)	New member elected. Republican hold.
25	R +11.7	Todd Jones	Republican	2016	▌ ✓ Todd Jones (Republican); ▌ Craig J. Meyer (Democratic)	Incumbent re-elected. Republican hold.
26	R +34.7	Lauren McDonald	Republican	2020	▌ ✓ Lauren McDonald (Republican); ▌ Matthew J. Helms (Democratic)	Incumbent re-elected. Republican hold.
27	R +61.4	Lee Hawkins	Republican	2012	▌ ✓ Lee Hawkins (Republican)	Incumbent re-elected. Republican hold.
28	R +52.0	None (open seat)			▌ ✓ Brent Cox (Republican); ▌ Claudia Wood (Democratic)	New seat. New member elected. Republican gain.
29	R +15.0	Matt Dubnik	Republican	2016	▌ ✓ Matt Dubnik (Republican); ▌ Devin Pandy (Democratic)	Incumbent re-elected. Republican hold.
30	R +42.5	Timothy Barr† (Note: Redistricted from the 103rd district.)	Republican	2012	▌ ✓ Derrick McCollum (Republican); ▌ Kim Floria (Democratic)	New member elected. Republican hold.
31	R +51.1	Tommy Benton†	Republican	2004	▌ ✓ Emory Dunahoo (Republican)	Republican loss.
31	R +51.1	Emory Dunahoo (Note: Redistricted from the 30th district.)	Republican	2011 (special)	▌ ✓ Emory Dunahoo (Republican)	Incumbent re-elected. Republican hold.
32	R +65.2	Chris Erwin (Note: Redistricted from the 28th district.)	Republican	2018 (special); 2019 (special)	▌ ✓ Chris Erwin (Republican)	Incumbent re-elected. Republican hold.
33	R +60.4	Alan Powell (Note: Redistricted from the 32nd district.)	Republican	1990	▌ ✓ Alan Powell (Republican)	Incumbent re-elected. Republican hold.
34	R +15.6	Devan Seabaugh	Republican	2021 (special)	▌ ✓ Devan Seabaugh (Republican); ▌ Dorothy Coker (Democratic)	Incumbent re-elected. Republican hold.
35	D +14.3	Ed Setzler†	Republican	2004	▌ ✓ Lisa Campbell (Democratic); ▌Robert Trim (Republican)	New member elected. Democratic gain.
36	R +19.2	Ginny Ehrhart	Republican	2018	▌ ✓ Ginny Ehrhart (Republican); ▌ James F. Ryner (Democratic)	Incumbent re-elected. Republican hold.
37	D +21.9	Mary Frances Williams	Democratic	2018	▌ ✓ Mary Frances Williams (Democratic); ▌ Tess Redding (Republican)	Incumbent re-elected. Democratic hold.
38	D +44.4	David Wilkerson	Democratic	2010	▌ ✓ David Wilkerson (Democratic)	Incumbent re-elected. Democratic hold.
39	D +56.8	Erica Thomas†	Democratic	2014	▌ ✓ Terry Cummings (Democratic); ▌ Olivia Angel (Republican)	New member elected. Democratic hold.
40	D +32.7	Erick Allen†	Democratic	2018	▌ ✓ Doug Stoner (Democratic); ▌ Fun Fong (Republican)	New member elected. Democratic hold.
41	D +41.6	Michael Smith	Democratic	2012	▌ ✓ Michael Smith (Democratic); ▌ James Allen Rodi (Republican)	Incumbent re-elected. Democratic hold.
42	D +42.3	Teri Anulewicz	Democratic	2017 (special)	▌ ✓ Teri Anulewicz (Democratic)	Incumbent re-elected. Democratic hold.
43	D +21.1	None (open seat)			▌ ✓ Solomon Adesanya (Democratic); ▌ Anna J. Tillman (Republican)	New seat. New member elected. Democratic gain.
44	R +7.9	Don Parsons	Republican	1994	▌ ✓ Don Parsons (Republican); ▌ Willie Mae Oyogoa (Democratic)	Incumbent re-elected. Republican hold.
45	R +4.1	Mitchell Kaye†	Republican	1992; 2022 (special)	▌ ✓ Sharon Cooper (Republican); ▌ Dustin McCormick (Democratic)	Republican loss.
45	R +4.1	Sharon Cooper (Note: Redistricted from the 43rd district.)	Republican	1996	▌ ✓ Sharon Cooper (Republican); ▌ Dustin McCormick (Democratic)	Incumbent re-elected. Republican hold.
46	R +9.9	John Carson	Republican	2011 (special)	▌ ✓ John Carson (Republican); ▌ Micheal Garza (Democratic)	Incumbent re-elected. Republican hold.
47	R +11.1	Jan Jones	Republican	2002	▌ ✓ Jan Jones (Republican)	Incumbent re-elected. Republican hold.
48	D +2.9	Mary Robichaux	Democratic	2018	▌ ✓ Scott Hilton (Republican); ▌ Mary Robichaux (Democratic)	New member elected. Republican gain.
49	R +3.9	Chuck Martin	Republican	2002	▌ ✓ Chuck Martin (Republican); ▌ Peggy Gillen (Democratic)	Incumbent re-elected. Republican hold.
50	D +18.6	Angelika Kausche†	Democratic	2018	▌ ✓ Michelle Au (Democratic); ▌ Narender Reddy (Republican)	New member elected. Democratic hold.
51	D +21.3	Josh McLaurin†	Democratic	2018	▌ ✓ Esther Panitch (Democratic); ▌ Peter Korman (Republican)	New member elected. Democratic hold.
52	D +26.8	Shea Roberts	Democratic	2020	▌ ✓ Shea Roberts (Democratic); ▌ Wedy Ahrenkiel (Republican)	Incumbent re-elected. Democratic hold.
52	D +26.8	Matthew Wilson† (Note: Redistricted from the 80th district.)	Democratic	2018	▌ ✓ Shea Roberts (Democratic); ▌ Wedy Ahrenkiel (Republican)	Republican loss.
53	D +9.4	None (open seat)			▌ ✓ Deborah Silcox (Republican); ▌ Kelly Coffman (Democratic)	New seat. New member elected. Republican gain.
54	D +21.8	Betsy Holland	Democratic	2018	▌ ✓ Betsy Holland (Democratic); ▌ John Bailey (Republican)	Incumbent re-elected. Democratic hold.
55	D +62.7	Marie Metze†	Democratic	2015 (special)	▌ ✓ Inga Willis (Democratic); ▌ Samuel Lenaeus (Republican)	New member elected. Democratic hold.
56	D +78.4	Mesha Mainor	Democratic	2020	▌ ✓ Mesha Mainor (Democratic)	Incumbent re-elected. Democratic hold.
57	D +61.0	Stacey Evans	Democratic	2010; 2020	▌ ✓ Stacey Evans (Democratic)	Incumbent re-elected. Democratic hold.
58	D +83.3	Park Cannon	Democratic	2016 (special)	▌ ✓ Park Cannon (Democratic)	Incumbent re-elected. Democratic hold.
59	D +85.7	None (open seat)			▌ ✓ Phil Olaleye (Democratic)	New seat. New member elected. Democratic gain.
60	D +60.5	Sheila Jones (Note: Redistricted from the 53rd district.)	Democratic	2004	▌ ✓ Sheila Jones (Democratic)	Incumbent re-elected. Democratic hold.
61	D +69.6	Roger Bruce	Democratic	2002	▌ ✓ Roger Bruce (Democratic)	Incumbent re-elected. Democratic hold.
62	D +84.2	William Boddie†	Democratic	2016	▌ ✓ Tanya F. Miller (Democratic)	New member elected. Democratic hold.
62	D +84.2	David Dreyer† (Note: Redistricted from the 59th district.)	Democratic	2016	▌ ✓ Tanya F. Miller (Democratic)	Democratic loss.
63	D +80.7	Kim Schofield	Democratic	2017 (special)	▌ ✓ Kim Schofield (Democratic)	Incumbent re-elected. Democratic hold.
64	R +14.6	Micah Gravley† (Note: Redistricted from the 64th district.)	Republican	2012	▌ ✓ Kimberly New (Republican); ▌ Montenia Edwards (Democratic)	New member elected. Republican hold.
65	D +39.0	Mandisha Thomas	Democratic	2020	▌ ✓ Mandisha Thomas (Democratic); ▌ Jan Horne (Republican)	Incumbent re-elected. Democratic hold.
66	D +37.5	Kimberly Alexander	Democratic	2012	▌ ✓ Kimberly Alexander (Democratic)	Incumbent re-elected. Democratic hold.
67	D +32.0	None (open seat)			▌ ✓ Lydia Glaize (Democratic); ▌ Marziyeh Marzi Amirizadeh (Republican)	New seat. New member elected. Democratic gain.
68	D +30.1	Derrick Jackson† (Note: Redistricted from the 64th district.)	Democratic	2016	▌ ✓ Tish Naghise (Democratic); ▌ Stoney Mathis (Republican)	New member elected. Democratic hold.
69	D +47.7	Debra Bazemore (Note: Redistricted from the 63rd district.)	Democratic	2016	▌ ✓ Debra Bazemore (Democratic)	Incumbent re-elected. Democratic hold.
70	R +23.0	Lynn Smith	Republican	1996	▌ ✓ Lynn Smith (Republican); ▌ Calvin Louis Anderson Jr. (Democratic)	Incumbent re-elected. Republican hold.
71	R +33.8	J. Collins (Note: Redistricted from the 68th district.)	Republican	2016	▌ ✓ J. Collins (Republican); ▌ Afoma Eugh Okafor (Democratic)	Incumbent re-elected. Republican hold.
72	R +42.2	Randy Nix† (Note: Redistricted from the 69th district.)	Republican	2006	▌ ✓ David Huddleston (Republican)	New member elected. Republican hold.
73	R +27.3	Josh Bonner (Note: Redistricted from the 72nd district.)	Republican	2016	▌ ✓ Josh Bonner (Republican)	Incumbent re-elected. Republican hold.
73	R +27.3	Philip Singleton† (Note: Redistricted from the 71st district.)	Republican	2019 (special)	▌ ✓ Josh Bonner (Republican)	Republican loss.
74	R +22.9	Karen Mathiak (Note: Redistricted from the 73rd district.)	Republican	2016	▌ ✓ Karen Mathiak (Republican); ▌ William Harris (Democratic)	Incumbent re-elected. Republican hold.
75	D +72.2	Mike Glanton	Democratic	2006; 2012	▌ ✓ Mike Glanton (Democratic); ▌ Della Ashley (Republican)	Incumbent re-elected. Democratic hold.
76	D +69.4	Sandra Scott	Democratic	2010	▌ ✓ Sandra Scott (Democratic)	Incumbent re-elected. Democratic hold.
77	D +78.1	Rhonda Burnough	Democratic	2016	▌ ✓ Rhonda Burnough (Democratic)	Incumbent re-elected. Democratic hold.
78	D +62.7	Demetrius Douglas	Democratic	2012	▌ ✓ Demetrius Douglas (Democratic)	Incumbent re-elected. Democratic hold.
79	D +75.4	Yasmin Neal (Note: Redistricted from the 74th district.)	Democratic	2010; 2020	▌ ✓ Yasmin Neal (Democratic)	Incumbent re-elected. Democratic hold.
80	D +22.9	Mike Wilensky†	Democratic	2018	▌ ✓ Long Tran (Democratic); ▌ Brian Anderson (Republican)	New member elected. Democratic hold.
81	D +41.6	Scott Holcomb	Democratic	2010	▌ ✓ Scott Holcomb (Democratic); ▌ Mary Williams Benefield (Republican)	Incumbent re-elected. Democratic hold.
82	D +60.3	Mary Margaret Oliver	Democratic	1987 (special); 2002	▌ ✓ Mary Margaret Oliver (Democratic); ▌ Jenine Milum (Republican)	Incumbent re-elected. Democratic hold.
83	D +31.4	None (open seat)			▌ ✓ Karen Lupton (Democratic); ▌ Catherine Bernard (Republican)	New seat. New member elected. Democratic gain.
84	D +85.7	Renitta Shannon†	Democratic	2016	▌ ✓ Omari Crawford (Democratic)	New member elected. Democratic hold.
85	D +79.3	Karla Drenner	Democratic	2000	▌ ✓ Karla Drenner (Democratic)	Incumbent re-elected. Democratic hold.
86	D +78.7	Zulma Lopez	Democratic	2020	▌ ✓ Imani Barnes (Democratic); ▌ Lisa Y. Kinnemore (Republican)	New member elected. Democratic hold.
87	D +75.4	Viola Davis	Democratic	2018	▌ ✓ Viola Davis (Democratic)	Incumbent re-elected. Democratic hold.
88	D +64.4	Billy Mitchell	Democratic	2002	▌ ✓ Billy Mitchell (Democratic); ▌ William Park Freeman (Republican)	Incumbent re-elected. Democratic hold.
89	D +82.9	Becky Evans (Note: Redistricted from the 83rd district.)	Democratic	2018	▌ ✓ Becky Evans (Democratic); ▌ Rick Sheppard (Republican)	Incumbent re-elected. Democratic hold.
90	D +87.1	Bee Nguyen† (Note: Redistricted from the 89th district.)	Democratic	2017 (special)	▌ ✓ Saira Draper (Democratic); ▌ Jodi Diodati (Republican)	New member elected. Democratic hold.
91	D +56.5	Angela Moore (Note: Redistricted from the 90th district.)	Democratic	2021 special)	▌ ✓ Angela Moore (Democratic)	Incumbent re-elected. Democratic hold.
92	D +51.7	Rhonda Taylor (Note: Redistricted from the 91st district.)	Democratic	2020	▌ ✓ Rhonda Taylor (Democratic)	Incumbent re-elected. Democratic hold.
93	D +48.8	Doreen Carter (Note: Redistricted from the 92nd district.)	Democratic	2015 (special)	▌ ✓ Doreen Carter (Democratic)	Incumbent re-elected. Democratic hold.
94	D +63.3	Karen Bennett	Democratic	2012	▌ ✓ Karen Bennett (Democratic)	Incumbent re-elected. Democratic hold.
95	D +58.4	Dar'shun Kendrick (Note: Redistricted from the 93rd district.)	Democratic	2010	▌ ✓ Dar'shun Kendrick (Democratic); ▌ Dexter Dawston (Republican)	Incumbent re-elected. Democratic hold.
96	D +33.2	Pedro Marin	Democratic	2002	▌ ✓ Pedro Marin (Democratic); ▌ Daelen Lowry (Republican)	Incumbent re-elected. Democratic hold.
97	D +27.6	Beth Moore† (Note: Redistricted from the 95th district.)	Democratic	2018	▌ ✓ Ruwa Romman (Democratic); ▌ John Chan (Republican)	New member elected. Democratic hold.
98	D +48.8	Marvin Lim (Note: Redistricted from the 99th district.)	Democratic	2020	▌ ✓ Marvin Lim (Democratic)	Incumbent re-elected. Democratic hold.
99	D +5.5	None (open seat)			▌ ✓ Matt Reeves (Republican); ▌ Om Duggal (Democratic)	New seat. New member elected. Republican gain.
100	R +19.9	David Clark (Note: Redistricted from the 98th district.)	Republican	2014	▌ ✓ David Clark (Republican); ▌ Louisa Shell Jackson (Democratic)	Incumbent re-elected. Republican hold.
100	R +19.9	Bonnie Rich (Note: Redistricted from the 97th district.)	Republican	2018	▌ ✓ David Clark (Republican); ▌ Louisa Shell Jackson (Democratic)	Incumbent re-elected. Republican hold.
101	D +12.5	Gregg Kennard (Note: Redistricted from the 102nd district.)	Democratic	2018	▌ ✓ Gregg Kennard (Democratic); ▌ Zach Procter (Republican)	Incumbent re-elected. Democratic hold.
102	D +31.0	None (open seat)			▌ ✓ Gabe Okoye (Democratic); ▌ Wesley S. Harding (Republican)	New seat. New member elected. Democratic gain.
103	R +13.2	None (open seat)			▌ ✓ Soo Hong (Republican); ▌ Ernie Anaya (Democratic)	New seat. New member elected. Republican gain.
104	R +27.2	Chuck Efstration	Republican	2013 (special)	▌ ✓ Chuck Efstration (Republican); ▌ Patrick J. Reinert (Democratic)	Incumbent re-elected. Republican hold.
105	D +8.7	None (open seat)			▌ ✓ Farooq Mughal (Democratic); ▌ Sandy Donatucci (Republican)	New seat. New member elected. Democratic gain.
106	D +18.6	Rebecca Mitchell	Democratic	2020	▌ ✓ Shelly Hutchinson (Democratic); ▌ Preston A. Wren (Republican)	Democratic loss.
106	D +18.6	Shelly Hutchinson (Note: Redistricted from the 107th district.)	Democratic	2018	▌ ✓ Shelly Hutchinson (Democratic); ▌ Preston A. Wren (Republican)	Incumbent re-elected. Democratic hold.
107	D +38.4	Sam Park (Note: Redistricted from the 101st district.)	Democratic	2016	▌ ✓ Sam Park (Democratic); ▌ Hai Cao (Republican)	Incumbent re-elected. Democratic hold.
108	D +10.3	Jasmine Clark	Democratic	2018	▌ ✓ Jasmine Clark (Democratic); ▌ Johnny Crist (Republican)	Incumbent re-elected. Democratic hold.
109	D +48.6	Dewey McClain (Note: Redistricted from the 100th district.)	Democratic	2013 (special)	▌ ✓ Dewey McClain (Democratic)	Incumbent re-elected. Democratic hold.
110	D +27.8	Donna McLeod† (Note: Redistricted from the 105th district.)	Democratic	2018	▌ ✓ Segun Adeyina (Democratic)	New member elected. Democratic hold.
111	R +30.2	Tom Kirby† (Note: Redistricted from the 114th district.)	Republican	2012 (special)	▌ ✓ Reynaldo Martinez (Republican); ▌ Ryan Cox (Democratic)	New member elected. Republican hold.
112	R +51.5	Bruce Williamson (Note: Redistricted from the 115th district.)	Republican	2010	▌ ✓ Bruce Williamson (Republican); ▌ Debbie Reed (Democratic)	Incumbent re-elected. Republican hold.
113	D +38.8	Sharon Henderson	Democratic	2020	▌ ✓ Sharon Henderson (Democratic)	Incumbent re-elected. Democratic hold.
114	R +36.7	Dave Belton† (Note: Redistricted from the 112th district.)	Republican	2014	▌ ✓ Tim Fleming (Republican); ▌ Malcolm Adams (Democratic)	New member elected. Republican hold.
115	D +21.8	Regina Lewis-Ward (Note: Redistricted from the 109th district.)	Democratic	2020	▌ ✓ Regina Lewis-Ward (Democratic)	Incumbent re-elected. Democratic hold.
116	D +40.0	El-Mahdi Holly (Note: Redistricted from the 111th district.)	Democratic	2018	▌ ✓ El-Mahdi Holly (Democratic); ▌ Bruce Bennington (Republican)	Incumbent re-elected. Democratic hold.
117	R +4.6	None (open seat)			▌ ✓ Lauren Daniel (Republican)	New seat. New member elected. Republican gain.
118	R +45.1	Clint Crowe (Note: Redistricted from the 110th district.)	Republican	2020	▌ ✓ Clint Crowe (Republican); ▌ Sharonda Bell (Democratic)	Incumbent re-elected. Republican hold.
118	R +45.1	Susan Holmes† (Note: Redistricted from the 129th district.)	Republican	2010	▌ ✓ Clint Crowe (Republican); ▌ Sharonda Bell (Democratic)	Republican loss.
119	R +44.8	Terry England† (Note: Redistricted from the 116th district.)	Republican	2004	▌ ✓ Danny Rampey (Republican)	New member elected. Republican hold.
120	R +10.0	Houston Gaines (Note: Redistricted from the 117th district.)	Republican	2018	▌ ✓ Houston Gaines (Republican); ▌ Mokah Jasmine Johnson (Democratic)	Incumbent re-elected. Republican hold.
121	R +7.9	Marcus Wiedower (Note: Redistricted from the 119th district.)	Republican	2018	▌ ✓ Marcus Wiedower (Republican); ▌ Jeff Auerbach (Democratic)	Incumbent re-elected. Republican hold.
122	D +56.6	Spencer Frye (Note: Redistricted from the 118th district.)	Democratic	2012	▌ ✓ Spencer Frye (Democratic)	Incumbent re-elected. Democratic hold.
123	R +35.8	Rob Leverett (Note: Redistricted from the 33rd district.)	Republican	2020	▌ ✓ Rob Leverett (Republican)	Incumbent re-elected. Republican hold.
124	R +20.2	Trey Rhodes (Note: Redistricted from the 120th district.)	Republican	2015 (special)	▌ ✓ Trey Rhodes (Republican); ▌ Kat Howkins (Democratic)	Incumbent re-elected. Republican hold.
125	R +24.6	Barry Fleming (Note: Redistricted from the 121st district.)	Republican	2002; 2012	▌ ✓ Barry Fleming (Republican)	Incumbent re-elected. Republican hold.
126	D +23.7	Gloria Frazier	Democratic	2006	▌ ✓ Gloria Frazier (Democratic); ▌ William C. Harris (Republican)	Incumbent re-elected. Democratic hold.
127	R +24.6	Mark Newton (Note: Redistricted from the 123rd district.)	Republican	2016	▌ ✓ Mark Newton (Republican)	Incumbent re-elected. Republican hold.
128	D +0.5	Mack Jackson	Democratic	2008	▌ ✓ Mack Jackson (Democratic)	Incumbent re-elected. Democratic hold.
129	D +36.6	Henry Howard (Note: Redistricted from the 124th district.)	Democratic	2006	▌ Henry Howard (Democratic)	Incumbent re-elected. Democratic hold.
130	D +36.3	Sheila Nelson† (Note: Redistricted from the 125th district.)	Democratic	2016	▌ ✓ Lynn Gladney (Democratic); ▌ Dan Swenson (Republican)	New member elected. Democratic hold.
131	R +26.2	Jodi Lott (Note: Redistricted from the 122nd district.)	Republican	2015 (special)	▌ ✓ Jodi Lott (Republican)	Incumbent re-elected. Republican hold.
132	D +40.0	Brian Prince (Note: Redistricted from the 127th district.)	Democratic	2013 (special)	▌ ✓ Brian Prince (Democratic)	Incumbent re-elected. Democratic hold.
133	R +8.7	Rick Williams† (Note: Redistricted from the 145th district.)	Republican	2016	▌ ✓ Kenneth Vance (Republican); ▌ Hoganne Harrison Walton (Democratic)	New member elected. Republican hold.
134	R +26.3	David Knight (Note: Redistricted from the 130th district.)	Republican	2004	▌ ✓ David Knight (Republican); ▌ Anthony Dickson (Democratic)	Incumbent re-elected. Republican hold.
135	R +46.8	Beth Camp (Note: Redistricted from the 131st district.)	Republican	2020	▌ ✓ Beth Camp (Republican)	Incumbent re-elected. Republican hold.
136	R +29.7	David Jenkins (Note: Redistricted from the 132nd district.)	Republican	2020	▌ ✓ David Jenkins (Republican)	Incumbent re-elected. Republican hold.
137	D +17.8	Debbie Buckner	Democratic	2002	▌ ✓ Debbie Buckner (Democratic); ▌ Justin Rickett (Republican)	Incumbent re-elected. Democratic hold.
138	R +39.8	Vance Smith (Note: Redistricted from the 133rd district.)	Republican	1992; 2018	▌ ✓ Vance Smith (Republican)	Incumbent re-elected. Republican hold.
139	R +21.4	Richard Smith (Note: Redistricted from the 134th district.)	Republican	2004	▌ ✓ Richard Smith (Republican)	Incumbent re-elected. Republican hold.
140	D +48.8	Calvin Smyre† (Note: Redistricted from the 135th district.)	Democratic	1974	▌ ✓ Tremaine Teddy Reese (Democratic)	New member elected. Democratic hold.
141	D +47.0	Carolyn Hugley (Note: Redistricted from the 136th district.)	Democratic	1992	▌ ✓ Carolyn Hugley (Democratic)	Incumbent re-elected. Democratic hold.
142	D +34.4	Miriam Paris	Democratic	2016	▌ ✓ Miriam Paris (Democratic)	Incumbent re-elected. Democratic hold.
143	D +41.6	James Beverly	Democratic	2011 (special)	▌ ✓ James Beverly (Democratic)	Incumbent re-elected. Democratic hold.
144	R +21.3	Dale Washburn (Note: Redistricted from the 141st district.)	Republican	2018	▌ ✓ Dale Washburn (Republican); ▌ Nettie B. Conner (Democratic)	Incumbent re-elected. Republican hold.
145	R +16.2	Robert Dickey (Note: Redistricted from the 140th district.)	Republican	2011 (special)	▌ ✓ Robert Dickey (Republican)	Incumbent re-elected. Republican hold.
146	R +22.9	Shaw Blackmon	Republican	2015 (special)	▌ ✓ Shaw Blackmon (Republican); ▌ Courtney L. Driver (Democratic)	Incumbent re-elected. Republican hold.
147	R +6.7	Heath Clark†	Republican	2014	▌ ✓ Bethany Ballard (Republican); ▌ Ariel Phillips (Democratic)	New member elected. Republican hold.
148	R +34.2	Noel Williams Jr.	Republican	2018	▌ ✓ Noel Williams Jr. (Republican)	Incumbent re-elected. Republican hold.
149	R +32.8	Robert Pruitt	Republican	2020	▌ ✓ Danny Mathis (Republican)	Republican loss.
149	R +32.8	Danny Mathis (Note: Redistricted from the 144th district.)	Republican	2018	▌ ✓ Danny Mathis (Republican)	Incumbent re-elected. Republican hold.
150	D +9.0	Patty Bentley	Democratic	2012	▌ ✓ Patty Bentley (Democratic)	Incumbent re-elected. Democratic hold.
151	R +3.8	Mike Cheokas (Note: Redistricted from the 138th district.)	Republican	2004; 2018	▌ ✓ Mike Cheokas (Republican); ▌ Joyce Barlow (Democratic)	Incumbent re-elected. Republican hold.
152	R +39.3	Bill Yearta	Republican	2019 (special)	▌ ✓ Bill Yearta (Republican)	Incumbent re-elected. Republican hold.
153	D +36.2	CaMia Hopson†	Democratic	2018	▌ ✓ David Sampson (Democratic); ▌ Tracy Taylor (Republican)	New member elected. Democratic hold.
154	D +7.5	Winfred Dukes†	Democratic	1996	▌ ✓ Gerald Greene (Republican); ▌ John Hayes (Democratic)	Democratic loss.
154	D +7.5	Gerald Greene (Note: Redistricted from the 151st district.)	Republican	1982	▌ ✓ Gerald Greene (Republican); ▌ John Hayes (Democratic)	Incumbent re-elected. Republican hold.
155	R +30.0	Matt Hatchett (Note: Redistricted from the 150th district.)	Republican	2010	▌ ✓ Matt Hatchett (Republican)	Incumbent re-elected. Republican hold.
156	R +40.1	Leesa Hagan	Republican	2021 (special)	▌ ✓ Leesa Hagan (Republican); ▌ Lethia J. Kittrell (Democratic)	Incumbent re-elected. Republican hold.
157	R +49.4	Bill Werkheiser	Republican	2014	▌ ✓ Bill Werkheiser (Republican)	Incumbent re-elected. Republican hold.
158	R +29.9	Butch Parrish	Republican	1984	▌ ✓ Butch Parrish (Republican); ▌ Madeline Ryan Smith (Democratic)	Incumbent re-elected. Republican hold.
159	R +38.6	Jon G. Burns	Republican	2004	▌ ✓ Jon G. Burns (Republican)	Incumbent re-elected. Republican hold.
160	R +35.8	Jan Tankersley†	Republican	2010	▌ ✓ Lehman Franklin (Republican)	New member elected. Republican hold.
161	R +18.3	Bill Hitchens	Republican	2012	▌ ✓ Bill Hitchens (Republican); ▌ Margo Barbee (Democratic)	Incumbent re-elected. Republican hold.
162	D +33.9	Carl Gilliard	Democratic	2016 (special)	▌ ✓ Carl Gilliard (Democratic)	Incumbent re-elected. Democratic hold.
163	D +44.7	Derek Mallow†	Democratic	2020	▌ ✓ Anne Allen Westbrook (Democratic)	New member elected. Democratic hold.
164	R +14.0	Ron Stephens	Republican	1997 (special)	▌ ✓ Ron Stephens (Republican); ▌ Marcus Thompson (Democratic)	Incumbent re-elected. Republican hold.
165	D +55.3	Edna Jackson	Democratic	2021 (special)	▌ ✓ Edna Jackson (Democratic)	Incumbent re-elected. Democratic hold.
166	R +30.2	Jesse Petrea	Republican	2014	▌ ✓ Jesse Petrea (Republican)	Incumbent re-elected. Republican hold.
167	R +34.3	Buddy DeLoach	Republican	1994; 2020	▌ ✓ Buddy DeLoach (Republican)	Incumbent re-elected. Republican hold.
168	D +24.1	Al Williams	Democratic	2002	▌ ✓ Al Williams (Democratic)	Incumbent re-elected. Democratic hold.
169	R +44.3	Dominic LaRiccia†	Republican	2014	▌ ✓ Clay Pirkle (Republican); ▌ Mickey Brockington (Democratic)	Republican loss.
169	R +44.3	Clay Pirkle (Note: Redistricted from the 155th district.)	Republican	2015 (special)	▌ ✓ Clay Pirkle (Republican); ▌ Mickey Brockington (Democratic)	Incumbent re-elected. Republican hold.
170	R +42.7	Penny Houston	Republican	1997 (special)	▌ ✓ Penny Houston (Republican)	Incumbent re-elected. Republican hold.
171	R +20.7	Joe Campbell	Republican	2020 (special)	▌ ✓ Joe Campbell (Republican)	Incumbent re-elected. Republican hold.
172	R +45.0	Sam Watson	Republican	2012	▌ ✓ Sam Watson (Republican)	Incumbent re-elected. Republican hold.
173	R +16.0	Darlene Taylor	Republican	2010	▌ ✓ Darlene Taylor (Republican); ▌ Keith Jenkins (Democratic)	Incumbent re-elected. Republican hold.
174	R +58.0	John Corbett	Republican	2014	▌ ✓ John Corbett (Republican)	Incumbent re-elected. Republican hold.
175	R +28.4	John LaHood	Republican	2018 (special)	▌ ✓ John LaHood (Republican)	Incumbent re-elected. Republican hold.
176	R +42.2	James Burchett	Republican	2019 (special)	▌ ✓ James Burchett (Republican)	Incumbent re-elected. Republican hold.
177	D +14.2	Dexter Sharper	Democratic	2012	▌ ✓ Dexter Sharper (Democratic)	Incumbent re-elected. Democratic hold.
178	R +67.9	Steven Meeks	Republican	2018	▌ ✓ Steven Meeks (Republican)	Incumbent re-elected. Republican hold.
179	R +15.7	Don Hogan†	Republican	2016	▌ ✓ Rick Townsend (Republican)	New member elected. Republican hold.
180	R +30.9	Steven Sainz	Republican	2018	▌ ✓ Steven Sainz (Republican)	Incumbent re-elected. Republican hold.

Popular vote
Republican	55.25%
Democratic	44.75%

House seats
Republican	56.11%
Democratic	43.89%

=== Closest races ===
Seats where the margin of victory was under 10%:

1. District 117, 1.46%
2. District 105, 3.44%
3. District 108, 4.2%
4. District 53, 5.26%
5. District 50, 8.02%
6. District 48, 9.62% (gain)

=== Incumbents retiring ===
==== Democrats ====
1. District 39: Erica Thomas retired.
2. District 40: Erick Allen retired to run for lieutenant governor.
3. District 50: Angelika Kausche retired.
4. District 51: Josh McLaurin retired to run for state senator from District 14.
5. District 55: Marie Metze retired.
6. District 62: (Note: Redistricted from the 59th district.) David Dreyer retired.
7. District 62: William Boddie retired to run for Commissioner of Labor.
8. District 68: (Note: Redistricted from the 64th district.) Derrick Jackson retired to run for lieutenant governor.
9. District 80: (Note: Redistrcted from the 79th district) Mike Wilensky retired.
10. District 52: (Note: Redistricted from the 80th district) Matthew Wilson retired to run for Insurance and Safety Fire Commissioner.
11. District 84: Renitta Shannon retired to run for lieutenant governor.
12. District 86: Zulma Lopez retired.
13. District 90: (Note: Redistricted from the 89th district.) Bee Nguyen retired to run for Secretary of State.
14. District 97: (Note: Redistricted from the 95th district.) Beth Moore retired to run for state senator from District 7.
15. District 110: (Note: Redistricted from the 105th district.) Donna McLeod retired to run for U.S. representative in Georgia's 7th congressional district.
16. District 130: (Note: Redistricted from the 125th district.) Sheila Nelson retired.
17. District 140: (Note: Redistricted from the 135th district.) Calvin Smyre resigned early.
18. District 153: CaMia Jackson retired.
19. District 154: Winfred Dukes retired to run for Commissioner of Agriculture.
20. District 163: Derek Mallow retired to run for state senator from District 2.

==== Republicans ====
1. District 3: Dewayne Hill retired.
2. District 22: Wes Cantrell retired.
3. District 30: (Note: Redistricted from the 103rd district.) Timothy Barr retired to run for U.S. representative in Georgia's 10th congressional district.
4. District 31: Tommy Benton retired.
5. District 35: Ed Setzler retired to run for state senator from District 37.
6. District 45: Mitchell Kaye retired.
7. District 64: (Note: Redistricted from the 67th district.) Micah Gravley retired.
8. District 72: (Note: Redistricted from the 69th district.) Randy Nix retired.
9. District 73: (Note: Redistricted from the 71st district.) Philip Singleton retired.
10. District 111: (Note: Redistricted from the 114th district.) Tom Kirby retired.
11. District 114: (Note: Redistricted from the 112th district.) Dave Belton retired.
12. District 118: (Note: Redistricted from the 129th district.) Susan Holmes retired.
13. District 119: (Note: Redistricted from the 116th district.) Terry England retired.
14. District 133: (Note: Redistricted from the 145th district.) Rick Williams retired to run for state senator from District 25.
15. District 147: Heath Clark retired.
16. District 160: Jan Tankersley retired.
17. District 169: Dominic LaRiccia retired.
18. District 179: Don Hogan retired.

=== Incumbents defeated in primary ===
==== Democrats ====
1. District 106: Rebecca Mitchell lost a redistricting race to fellow incumbent Shelly Hutchinson (Note: Redistricted from the 107th district.)

==== Republicans ====
1. District 24: Sheri Smallwood Gilligan lost re-nomination to Carter Barrett.
2. District 100: Bonnie Rich (Note: Redistricted from the 97th district.) lost a redistricting race to fellow incumbent David Clark. (Note: Redistricted from the 98th district.)
3. District 149: Robert Pruitt lost a redistricting race to fellow incumbent Danny Mathis. (Note: Redistricted from the 144th district.)

== Detailed results ==
Source for primary election results: Source for general election results:

=== District 1 ===
Incumbent Republican Mike Cameron had represented the 1st district since 2021.

1st district Republican primary
Party	Candidate	Votes	%
Republican	Mike Cameron (incumbent)	6,150	75.89%
Republican	Jackie Harling	1,954	24.11%
Total votes		8,104	100%

1st district general election
Party	Candidate	Votes	%
Republican	Mike Cameron (incumbent)	16,245	100%
Total votes		16,245	100%
Republican hold			

=== District 2 ===
Incumbent Republican Steve Tarvin had represented the 2nd district since 2014.

2nd district Republican primary
Party	Candidate	Votes	%
Republican	Steve Tarvin (incumbent)	6,582	65.97%
Republican	Jim Coles	1,710	17.14%
Republican	Ted Noblitt	1,686	16.90%
Total votes		9,978	100%

2nd district general election
Party	Candidate	Votes	%
Republican	Steve Tarvin (incumbent)	19,444	100%
Total votes		19,444	100%
Republican hold			

=== District 3 ===
Incumbent Republican Dewayne Hill had represented the 3rd district since 2017. Hill did not seek re-election, and was succeeded by fellow Republican Mitchell Horner.

3rd district Republican primary
Party	Candidate	Votes	%
Republican	Mitchell Horner	4,730	53.96%
Republican	Darrell Weldon Sr.	4,036	46.04%
Total votes		8,766	100%

3rd district general election
Party	Candidate	Votes	%
Republican	Mitchell Horner	18,088	100%
Total votes		18,088	100%
Republican hold			

=== District 4 ===
Incumbent Republican Kasey Carpenter had represented the 4th district since 2017.

4th district Republican primary
Party	Candidate	Votes	%
Republican	Kasey Carpenter (incumbent)	3,141	66.21%
Republican	Nick Voyles	1,603	33.79%
Total votes		4,744	100%

4th district general election
Party	Candidate	Votes	%
Republican	Kasey Carpenter (incumbent)	9,762	100%
Total votes		9,762	100%
Republican hold			

=== District 5 ===
Incumbent Republican Matt Barton had represented the 5th district since 2019.

5th district general election
Party	Candidate	Votes	%
Republican	Matt Barton (incumbent)	17,449	100%
Total votes		17,449	100%
Republican hold			

=== District 6 ===
Incumbent Republican Jason Ridley had represented the 6th district since 2017.

6th district Republican primary
Party	Candidate	Votes	%
Republican	Jason Ridley (incumbent)	6,160	66.43%
Republican	Lee Coker	3,113	33.57%
Total votes		9,273	100%

6th district general election
Party	Candidate	Votes	%
Republican	Jason Ridley (incumbent)	16,826	100%
Total votes		16,826	100%
Republican hold			

=== District 7 ===
Incumbent Republican Speaker David Ralston had represented the 7th district and its predecessors since 2003.

7th district general election
Party	Candidate	Votes	%
Republican	David Ralston (incumbent)	24,886	100%
Total votes		24,886	100%
Republican hold			

=== District 8 ===
Incumbent Republican Stan Gunter had represented the 8th district since 2021.

8th district general election
Party	Candidate	Votes	%
Republican	Stan Gunter (incumbent)	26,573	84.30%
Democratic	June Krise	4,948	15.70%
Total votes		31,521	100%
Republican hold			

=== District 9 ===
Incumbent Republican Will Wade had represented the 9th district since 2021.

9th district Republican primary
Party	Candidate	Votes	%
Republican	Will Wade (incumbent)	9,333	81.53%
Republican	Tyler Tolin	2,114	18.47%
Total votes		11,447	100%

9th district general election
Party	Candidate	Votes	%
Republican	Will Wade (incumbent)	22,850	100%
Total votes		22,850	100%
Republican hold			

=== District 10 ===
Incumbent Republican Victor Anderson had represented the 10th district since 2021.

10th district general election
Party	Candidate	Votes	%
Republican	Victor Anderson (incumbent)	21,322	100%
Total votes		21,322	100%
Republican hold			

=== District 11 ===
Incumbent Republican Rick Jasperse had represented the 11th district and its predecessors since 2010.

11th district general election
Party	Candidate	Votes	%
Republican	Rick Jasperse (incumbent)	22,790	84.06%
Democratic	Kayla Hollifield	4,323	15.94%
Total votes		27,113	100%
Republican hold			

=== District 12 ===
Incumbent Republican Eddie Lumsden had represented the 12th district since 2013.

12th district Republican primary
Party	Candidate	Votes	%
Republican	Eddie Lumsden (incumbent)	7,019	81.88%
Republican	Robert Watson	1,553	18.12%
Total votes		8,572	100%

12th district general election
Party	Candidate	Votes	%
Republican	Eddie Lumsden (incumbent)	17,153	100%
Total votes		17,153	100%
Republican hold			

=== District 13 ===
Incumbent Republican Katie Dempsey had represented the 13th district since 2007.

13th district Republican primary
Party	Candidate	Votes	%
Republican	Katie Dempsey (incumbent)	5,365	72.42%
Republican	Luke Martin	1,253	16.91%
Republican	Brad Barnes	790	10.66%
Total votes		7,408	100%

13th district general election
Party	Candidate	Votes	%
Republican	Katie Dempsey (incumbent)	15,097	100%
Total votes		15,097	100%
Republican hold			

=== District 14 ===
Incumbent Republican Mitchell Scoggins had represented the 14th district since 2019.

14th district general election
Party	Candidate	Votes	%
Republican	Mitchell Scoggins (incumbent)	21,640	100%
Total votes		21,640	100%
Republican hold			

=== District 15 ===
Incumbent Republican Matthew Gambill had represented the 15th district since 2019.

15th district general election
Party	Candidate	Votes	%
Republican	Matthew Gambill (incumbent)	17,718	100%
Total votes		17,718	100%
Republican hold			

=== District 16 ===
Incumbent Republican Trey Kelley had represented the 16th district since 2013.

16th district Republican primary
Party	Candidate	Votes	%
Republican	Trey Kelley (incumbent)	6,066	62.43%
Republican	Scott Richards	3,650	37.57%
Total votes		9,716	100%

16th district general election
Party	Candidate	Votes	%
Republican	Trey Kelley (incumbent)	17,976	100%
Total votes		17,976	100%
Republican hold			

=== District 17 ===
Incumbent Republican Martin Momtahan had represented the 17th district since 2019.

17th district Republican primary
Party	Candidate	Votes	%
Republican	Martin Momtahan (incumbent)	5,214	79.28%
Republican	Neil Wolin	1,363	20.72%
Total votes		6,577	100%

17th district general election
Party	Candidate	Votes	%
Republican	Martin Momtahan (incumbent)	14,522	65.25%
Democratic	Sunshine Marshall	7,733	34.75%
Total votes		22,255	100%
Republican hold			

=== District 18 ===
Incumbent Republican Tyler Smith had represented the 18th district since 2021.

18th district general election
Party	Candidate	Votes	%
Republican	Tyler Smith (incumbent)	20,567	86.45%
Democratic	Pat Rhudy	3,225	13.55%
Total votes		23,792	100%
Republican hold			

=== District 19 ===
Incumbent Republican Joseph Gullett had represented the 19th district since 2019.

19th district general election
Party	Candidate	Votes	%
Republican	Joseph Gullett (incumbent)	14,440	63.64%
Democratic	R.J. Coyle	8,249	36.36%
Total votes		22,689	100%
Republican hold			

=== District 20 ===
Incumbent Republican Charlice Byrd had represented the 20th district since 2021.

20th district Republican primary
Party	Candidate	Votes	%
Republican	Charlice Byrd (incumbent)	6,914	66.44%
Republican	Lynne Saunders	1,787	17.17%
Republican	Stu Hixon	1,705	16.38%
Total votes		10,406	100%

20th district general election
Party	Candidate	Votes	%
Republican	Charlice Byrd (incumbent)	21,626	100%
Total votes		21,626	100%
Republican hold			

=== District 21 ===
Incumbent Republican Brad Thomas had represented the 21st district since 2021.

21st district general election
Party	Candidate	Votes	%
Republican	Brad Thomas (incumbent)	25,685	100%
Total votes		25,685	100%
Republican hold			

=== District 22 ===
Incumbent Republican Wes Cantrell had represented the 22nd district since 2015. Cantrell did not seek re-election and was succeeded by fellow Republican Jordan Ridley.

22nd district Republican primary
Party	Candidate	Votes	%
Republican	Jordan Ridley	4,033	53.50%
Republican	Donna Kosicki	3,505	46.50%
Total votes		7,538	100%

22nd district general election
Party	Candidate	Votes	%
Republican	Jordan Ridley	14,685	61.51%
Democratic	Stacee Lashone Hill	9,190	38.49%
Total votes		23,875	100%
Republican hold			

=== District 23 ===
Incumbent Republican Mandi Ballinger had represented the 23rd district since 2013.

23rd district Republican primary
Party	Candidate	Votes	%
Republican	Mandi Ballinger (incumbent)	8,143	77.80%
Republican	Allen Hutchinson	2,324	22.20%
Total votes		10,467	100%

23rd district general election
Party	Candidate	Votes	%
Republican	Mandi Ballinger (incumbent)	21,252	100%
Total votes		21,252	100%
Republican hold			

=== District 24 ===
Incumbent Republican Sheri Smallwood Gilligan had represented the 24th district since 2015. Gilligan lost re-nomination to fellow Republican Carter Barrett, who went on to win the general election.

24th district Republican primary
Party	Candidate	Votes	%
Republican	Sheri Smallwood Gilligan (incumbent)	4,042	49.69%
Republican	Carter Barrett	3,418	42.02%
Republican	Ed Solly	675	8.30%
Total votes		8,135	100%

24th district Republican primary run-off election, 2022
Party	Candidate	Votes	%
Republican	Carter Barrett	2,317	58.79%
Republican	Sheri Smallwood Gilligan (incumbent)	1,624	41.21%
Total votes		3,941	100%

24th district general election
Party	Candidate	Votes	%
Republican	Carter Barrett	15,593	67.22%
Democratic	Sydney Walker	7,604	32.78%
Total votes		23,197	100%
Republican hold			

=== District 25 ===
Incumbent Republican Todd Jones had represented the 25th district since 2017.

25th district general election
Party	Candidate	Votes	%
Republican	Todd Jones (incumbent)	14,881	62.69%
Democratic	Craig Meyer	8,858	37.31%
Total votes		23,739	100%
Republican hold			

=== District 26 ===
Incumbent Republican Lauren McDonald had represented the 26th district since 2021.

26th district general election
Party	Candidate	Votes	%
Republican	Lauren McDonald (incumbent)	17,124	72.44%
Democratic	Matthew Helms	6,515	27.56%
Total votes		23,639	100%
Republican hold			

=== District 27 ===
Incumbent Republican Lee Hawkins had represented the 27th district since 2013.

27th district general election
Party	Candidate	Votes	%
Republican	Lee Hawkins (incumbent)	22,947	100%
Total votes		22,947	100%
Republican hold			

=== District 28 ===
The new 28th district includes parts of Forsyth and Hall counties and had no incumbent. Republican Brent Cox won the open seat.

28th district Republican primary
Party	Candidate	Votes	%
Republican	Brent Cox	3,367	32.31%
Republican	Julie Tressler	2,363	22.68%
Republican	Tim Short	2,188	21.00%
Republican	Blake McClellan	1,396	13.40%
Republican	Donald Lannom	746	7.16%
Republican	John Luchetti	361	3.46%
Total votes		10,421	100%

28th district Republican primary run-off election, 2022
Party	Candidate	Votes	%
Republican	Brent Cox	2,332	56.02%
Republican	Julie Tressler	1,831	43.98%
Total votes		4,163	100%

28th district general election
Party	Candidate	Votes	%
Republican	Brent Cox	20,474	80.00%
Democratic	Claudia Wood	5,118	20.00%
Total votes		25,592	100%
Republican win (new seat)			

=== District 29 ===
Incumbent Republican Matt Dubnik had represented the 29th district since 2017.

29th district general election
Party	Candidate	Votes	%
Republican	Matt Dubnik (incumbent)	8,413	63.58%
Democratic	Devin Pandy	4,819	36.42%
Total votes		13,232	100%
Republican hold			

=== District 30 ===
The new 30th district includes part of Hall and Gwinnett counties and overlaps with much of the former 103rd district, which had been represented by Republican Timothy Barr since 2013. Barr retired to run for Congress, and fellow Republican Derrick McCollum won the open seat.

30th district Republican primary
Party	Candidate	Votes	%
Republican	Derrick McCollum	4,975	49.80%
Republican	Whitney Pimentel	3,202	32.06%
Republican	Barry Sanders	1,812	18.14%
Total votes		9,989	100%

30th district Republican primary run-off election, 2022
Party	Candidate	Votes	%
Republican	Derrick McCollum	2,611	69.00%
Republican	Whitney Pimentel	1,173	31.00%
Total votes		3,784	100%

30th district general election
Party	Candidate	Votes	%
Republican	Derrick McCollum	19,227	75.73%
Democratic	Kim Floria	6,161	24.27%
Total votes		25,388	100%
Republican hold			

=== District 31 ===
The new 31st district includes the homes of incumbent Republicans Tommy Benton, who had represented the 31st district since 2005, and Emory Dunahoo, who had represented the 30th district since 2011. Benton retired and Dunahoo was re-elected here.

31st district Republican primary
Party	Candidate	Votes	%
Republican	Emory Dunahoo (incumbent)	4,931	53.00%
Republican	Don Clerici	4,373	47.00%
Total votes		9,304	100%

31st district general election
Party	Candidate	Votes	%
Republican	Emory Dunahoo (incumbent)	20,258	100%
Total votes		20,258	100%
Republican hold			

=== District 32 ===
The new 32nd district is the successor of the old 28th district. Incumbent Republican Chris Erwin, who had represented the 28th district since 2019, was re-elected here unopposed.

32nd district general election
Party	Candidate	Votes	%
Republican	Chris Erwin (incumbent)	19,468	100%
Total votes		19,468	100%
Republican hold			

=== District 33 ===
The new 33rd district is the successor of the old 32nd district. Incumbent Republican Alan Powell, who had represented the 32nd district and its predecessors since 1991, was re-elected here.

33rd district Republican primary
Party	Candidate	Votes	%
Republican	Alan Powell (incumbent)	8,726	74.18%
Republican	Dylan Purcell	3,037	25.82%
Total votes		11,763	100%

33rd district general election
Party	Candidate	Votes	%
Republican	Alan Powell (incumbent)	21,440	100%
Total votes		21,440	100%
Republican hold			

=== District 34 ===
Incumbent Republican Devan Seabaugh had represented the 34th district since 2021.

34th district general election
Party	Candidate	Votes	%
Republican	Devan Seabaugh (incumbent)	19,155	62.19%
Democratic	Dorothy Coker	11,645	37.81%
Total votes		30,800	100%
Republican hold			

=== District 35 ===
Incumbent Republican Ed Setzler had represented the 35th district since 2005. Setzler retired to run for the State Senate. Democrat Lisa Campbell won the open seat.

35th district Democratic primary
Party	Candidate	Votes	%
Democratic	Lisa Campbell	2,051	60.27%
Democratic	Nick Miller	563	16.54%
Democratic	Kyle Rinaudo	789	23.19%
Total votes		3,403	100%

35th district general election
Party	Candidate	Votes	%
Democratic	Lisa Campbell	11,156	55.99%
Republican	Robert Trim	8,769	44.01%
Total votes		19,925	100%
Democratic gain from Republican			

=== District 36 ===
Incumbent Republican Ginny Ehrhart had represented the 36th district since 2019.

36th district general election
Party	Candidate	Votes	%
Republican	Ginny Ehrhart (incumbent)	19,649	62.93%
Democratic	James Ryner	11,576	37.07%
Total votes		31,225	100%
Republican hold			

=== District 37 ===
Incumbent Democrat Mary Frances Williams had represented the 37th district since 2019.

37th district general election
Party	Candidate	Votes	%
Democratic	Mary Frances Williams (incumbent)	11,825	57.41%
Republican	Marites "Tess" Redding	8,774	42.59%
Total votes		20,599	100%
Democratic hold			

=== District 38 ===
Incumbent Democrat David Wilkerson had represented the 38th district and its predecessors since 2011.

38th district general election
Party	Candidate	Votes	%
Democratic	David Wilkerson (incumbent)	18,275	100%
Total votes		18,275	100%
Democratic hold			

=== District 39 ===
Incumbent Democrat Erica Thomas had represented the 39th district since 2015. Thomas did not seek re-election, and fellow Democrat Terry Cummings won the open seat.

39th district Democratic primary
Party	Candidate	Votes	%
Democratic	Monica Evette Delancy	1,881	28.99%
Democratic	Terry Cummings	1,752	27.00%
Democratic	Tamarre Pierre	1,355	20.88%
Democratic	Deborah Johnson	1,262	19.45%
Democratic	Wanda Lesteranthony	238	3.67%
Total votes		6,488	100%

39th district Democratic primary run-off election, 2022
Party	Candidate	Votes	%
Democratic	Terry Cummings	1,409	56.79%
Democratic	Monica Evette Delancy	1,072	43.21%
Total votes		2,481	100%

39th district general election
Party	Candidate	Votes	%
Democratic	Terry Cummings	15,634	78.40%
Republican	Olivia Angel	4,308	21.60%
Total votes		19,942	100%
Democratic hold			

=== District 40 ===
Incumbent Democrat Erick Allen had represented the 40th district since 2019. Allen retired to run for lieutenant governor. Fellow Democrat Doug Stoner won the open seat.

40th district Democratic primary
Party	Candidate	Votes	%
Democratic	Doug Stoner	3,360	59.56%
Democratic	Thomas Casez	2,281	40.44%
Total votes		5,641	100%

40th district general election
Party	Candidate	Votes	%
Democratic	Doug Stoner	17,265	64.21%
Republican	Fun Fong	9,623	35.79%
Total votes		26,888	100%
Democratic hold			

=== District 41 ===
Incumbent Democrat Michael Smith had represented the 41st district since 2013.

41st district general election
Party	Candidate	Votes	%
Democratic	Michael Smith (incumbent)	11,336	71.00%
Republican	James Allen Rodi	4,630	29.00%
Total votes		15,966	100%
Democratic hold			

=== District 42 ===
Incumbent Democrat Teri Anulewicz had represented the 42nd district since 2017.

42nd district general election
Party	Candidate	Votes	%
Democratic	Teri Anulewicz (incumbent)	14,693	100%
Total votes		14,693	100%
Democratic hold			

=== District 43 ===
The new 43rd district includes parts of eastern Cobb County and had no incumbent. Democrat Solomon Adesanya won the open seat.

43rd district Democratic primary
Party	Candidate	Votes	%
Democratic	Solomon Adesanya	1,845	57.16%
Democratic	Benjamin Stahl	1,383	42.84%
Total votes		3,228	100%

43rd district general election
Party	Candidate	Votes	%
Democratic	Solomon Adesanya	10,614	56.14%
Republican	Anna J. Tillman	8,293	43.86%
Total votes		18,907	100%
Democratic win (new seat)			

=== District 44 ===
Incumbent Republican Don Parsons had represented the 44th district and its predecessors since 1995.

44th district general election
Party	Candidate	Votes	%
Republican	Don Parsons (incumbent)	15,278	58.89%
Democratic	Willie Mae Oyogoa	10,666	41.11%
Total votes		25,944	100%
Republican hold			

=== District 45 ===
The new 45th district includes the homes of incumbent Republicans Mitchell Kaye, who had represented the 45th district since his appointment on May 17, 2022, and Sharon Cooper, who had represented the 43rd district and its predecessors since 1997. Kaye retired and Cooper was re-elected here.

45th district Republican primary
Party	Candidate	Votes	%
Republican	Sharon Cooper (incumbent)	10,718	78.38%
Republican	Carminthia Moore	2,957	21.62%
Total votes		13,675	100%

45th district general election
Party	Candidate	Votes	%
Republican	Sharon Cooper (incumbent)	18,572	58.89%
Democratic	Dustin McCormick	12,966	41.11%
Total votes		31,538	100%
Republican hold			

=== District 46 ===
Incumbent Republican John Carson had represented the 46th district since 2011.

46th district general election
Party	Candidate	Votes	%
Republican	John Carson (incumbent)	17,920	59.78%
Democratic	Micheal Garza	12,057	40.22%
Total votes		29,977	100%
Republican hold			

=== District 47 ===
Incumbent Republican Speaker pro tempore Jan Jones had represented the 47th district and its predecessors since 2003.

47th district general election
Party	Candidate	Votes	%
Republican	Jan Jones (incumbent)	19,338	100%
Total votes		19,338	100%
Republican hold			

=== District 48 ===
Incumbent Democrat Mary Robichaux had represented the 48th district since 2019. Robichaux lost re-election to Republican Scott Hilton.

48th district general election
Party	Candidate	Votes	%
Republican	Scott Hilton	14,536	54.30%
Democratic	Mary Robichaux (incumbent)	12,232	45.70%
Total votes		26,768	100%
Republican gain from Democratic			

=== District 49 ===
Incumbent Republican Chuck Martin had represented the 49th district and its predecessors since 2003.

49th district Republican primary
Party	Candidate	Votes	%
Republican	Chuck Martin (incumbent)	7,095	81.63%
Republican	Michael Gordon	1,597	18.37%
Total votes		8,692	100%

49th district general election
Party	Candidate	Votes	%
Republican	Chuck Martin (incumbent)	17,092	58.06%
Democratic	Peggy Gillen	12,346	41.94%
Total votes		29,438	100%
Republican hold			

=== District 50 ===
Incumbent Democrat Angelika Kausche had represented the 50th district since 2019. Kausche did not seek re-election, and was succeeded by State Senator Michelle Au.

50th district Republican primary
Party	Candidate	Votes	%
Republican	Betsy Kramer	2,273	46.11%
Republican	Narender Reddy	1,378	27.95%
Republican	Jill Trammell	1,279	25.94%
Total votes		4,930	100%

50th district Republican primary run-off election, 2022
Party	Candidate	Votes	%
Republican	Narender Reddy	936	50.30%
Republican	Betsy Kramer	925	49.70%
Total votes		1,861	100%

50th district general election
Party	Candidate	Votes	%
Democratic	Michelle Au	11,989	54.04%
Republican	Narender Reddy	10,198	45.96%
Total votes		22,187	100%
Democratic hold			

=== District 51 ===
Incumbent Democrat Josh McLaurin had represented the 51st district since 2019. McLaurin retired to run for the State Senate. Democrat Esther Panitch won the open seat.

51st district Democratic primary
Party	Candidate	Votes	%
Democratic	Esther Panitch	2,069	53.32%
Democratic	Erendira Brumley	1,811	46.68%
Total votes		3,880	100%

51st district general election
Party	Candidate	Votes	%
Democratic	Esther Panitch	12,763	55.80%
Republican	Peter Korman	10,111	44.20%
Total votes		22,874	100%
Democratic hold			

=== District 52 ===
The new 52nd district includes the homes of incumbent Democrats Shea Roberts, who had represented the 52nd district since 2021, and Matthew Wilson, who had represented the 80th district since 2019. Wilson retired to run for Insurance and Fire Safety Commissioner, and Roberts was re-elected here.

52nd district general election
Party	Candidate	Votes	%
Democratic	Shea Roberts (incumbent)	14,089	60.55%
Republican	Wendy Ahrenkiel	9,181	39.45%
Total votes		23,270	100%
Democratic hold			

=== District 53 ===
The new 53rd district is an open seat that contains parts of Fulton County including Buckhead, Sandy Springs, and Roswell. Republican former representative Deborah Silcox won the open seat.

53rd district general election
Party	Candidate	Votes	%
Republican	Deborah Silcox	15,160	52.60%
Democratic	Kelly Coffman	13,664	47.40%
Total votes		28,824	100%
Republican win (new seat)			

=== District 54 ===
Incumbent Democrat Betsy Holland had represented the 54th district since 2019.

54th district general election
Party	Candidate	Votes	%
Democratic	Betsy Holland (incumbent)	13,542	57.83%
Republican	John Bailey	9,876	42.17%
Total votes		23,418	100%
Democratic hold			

=== District 55 ===
Incumbent Democrat Marie Metze had represented the 55th district since 2015. Metze did not seek re-election, and fellow Democrat Inga Willis won the open seat.

55th district Democratic primary
Party	Candidate	Votes	%
Democratic	Inga Willis	3,326	53.48%
Democratic	Nate Green	2,893	46.52%
Total votes		6,219	100%

55th district general election
Party	Candidate	Votes	%
Democratic	Inga Willis	17,644	78.33%
Republican	Samuel S. Lenaeus	4,880	21.67%
Total votes		22,524	100%
Democratic hold			

=== District 56 ===
Incumbent Democrat Mesha Mainor had represented the 56th district since 2021.

56th district Democratic primary
Party	Candidate	Votes	%
Democratic	Mesha Mainor (incumbent)	3,300	65.29%
Democratic	Keona Jones	1,397	27.64%
Democratic	Will Chandler	357	7.06%
Total votes		5,054	100%

56th district general election
Party	Candidate	Votes	%
Democratic	Mesha Mainor (incumbent)	16,054	100%
Total votes		16,054	100%
Democratic hold			

=== District 57 ===
Incumbent Democrat Stacey Evans had represented the 57th district since 2021.

57th district general election
Party	Candidate	Votes	%
Democratic	Stacey Evans (incumbent)	22,954	100%
Total votes		22,954	100%
Democratic hold			

=== District 58 ===
Incumbent Democrat Park Cannon had represented the 58th district since 2016.

58th district Democratic primary
Party	Candidate	Votes	%
Democratic	Park Cannon (incumbent)	5,931	82.35%
Democratic	Brandon Tonge	1,271	17.65%
Total votes		7,202	100%

58th district general election
Party	Candidate	Votes	%
Democratic	Park Cannon (incumbent)	18,866	100%
Total votes		18,866	100%
Democratic hold			

=== District 59 ===
The new 59th district includes parts of Fulton County including the Atlanta neighborhoods of Mechanicsville, Pittsburgh, Sylvan Hills, Capitol View, and Forrest Park. Democrat Phil Olaleye won the open seat.

59th district Democratic primary
Party	Candidate	Votes	%
Democratic	Phil Olaleye	3,765	53.84%
Democratic	Toney Collins	3,228	46.16%
Total votes		6,993	100%

59th district general election
Party	Candidate	Votes	%
Democratic	Phil Olaleye	18,983	100%
Total votes		18,983	100%
Democratic win (new seat)			

=== District 60 ===
The new 60th district is the successor of the old 53rd district. Incumbent Democrat Sheila Jones, who had represented the 53rd district and its predecessors since 2005, was re-elected here.

60th district Democratic primary
Party	Candidate	Votes	%
Democratic	Sheila Jones (incumbent)	6,088	88.50%
Democratic	Steven D. Lee	791	11.50%
Total votes		6,879	100%

60th district general election
Party	Candidate	Votes	%
Democratic	Sheila Jones (incumbent)	20,874	100%
Total votes		20,874	100%
Democratic hold			

=== District 61 ===
Incumbent Democrat Roger Bruce had represented the 61st district and its predecessors since 2003.

61st district Democratic primary
Party	Candidate	Votes	%
Democratic	Roger Bruce (incumbent)	4,536	47.20%
Democratic	Rashaun Kemp	1,841	19.16%
Democratic	Robert Dawson	1,740	18.10%
Democratic	Monique McCoy	1,494	15.54%
Total votes		9,611	100%

61st district Democratic primary run-off election, 2022
Party	Candidate	Votes	%
Democratic	Roger Bruce (incumbent)	2,304	53.42%
Democratic	Rashaun Kemp	2,009	46.58%
Total votes		4,313	100%

61st district general election
Party	Candidate	Votes	%
Democratic	Roger Bruce (incumbent)	20,091	100%
Total votes		20,091	100%
Democratic hold			

=== District 62 ===
The new 62nd district includes the homes of incumbent Democrats William Boddie, who had represented the 62nd district since 2017, and David Dreyer, who had represented the 59th district since 2017. Dreyer did not seek re-election, and Boddie retired to run for Labor Commissioner. Democrat Tanya Miller won the open seat.

62nd district Democratic primary
Party	Candidate	Votes	%
Democratic	Tanya Miller	4,311	53.98%
Democratic	Thomas Calloway	2,110	26.42%
Democratic	Josh Noblitt	1,565	19.60%
Total votes		7,986	100%

62nd district general election
Party	Candidate	Votes	%
Democratic	Tanya Miller	19,495	100%
Total votes		19,495	100%
Democratic hold			

=== District 63 ===
The new 63rd district is the successor of the old 60th district. Incumbent Democrat Kim Schofield, who had represented the 60th district since 2017, was re-elected here.

63rd district general election
Party	Candidate	Votes	%
Democratic	Kim Schofield (incumbent)	17,241	100%
Total votes		17,241	100%
Democratic hold			

=== District 64 ===
The new 64th district is the successor of the old 67th district. Incumbent Republican Micah Gravley, who had represented the 67th district since 2013, did not seek re-election. Republican Kimberly New won the open seat.

64th district Democratic primary
Party	Candidate	Votes	%
Democratic	Montenia Edwards	2,342	61.76%
Democratic	Christopher R. Thornton	850	22.42%
Democratic	Mignon Willis	600	15.82%
Total votes		3,792	100%

64th district Republican primary
Party	Candidate	Votes	%
Republican	Kimberly New	3,864	56.87%
Republican	Shane Miller	2,831	41.66%
Republican	Preston Parra	100	1.47%
Total votes		6,795	100%

64th district general election
Party	Candidate	Votes	%
Republican	Kimberly New	13,556	57.46%
Democratic	Montenia Edwards	10,037	42.54%
Total votes		23,593	100%
Republican hold			

=== District 65 ===
Incumbent Democrat Mandisha Thomas had represented the 65th district since 2021.

65th district general election
Party	Candidate	Votes	%
Democratic	Mandisha Thomas (incumbent)	18,436	69.70%
Republican	Jan Horne	8,014	30.30%
Total votes		26,450	100%
Democratic hold			

=== District 66 ===
Incumbent Democrat Kimberly Alexander had represented the 66th district since 2013.

66th district general election
Party	Candidate	Votes	%
Democratic	Kimberly Alexander (incumbent)	16,557	100%
Total votes		16,557	100%
Democratic hold			

=== District 67 ===
The new 67th district includes parts of southern Fulton County and northeastern Coweta County. Democrat Lyda Glaize won the open seat.

67th district general election
Party	Candidate	Votes	%
Democratic	Lydia Glaize	14,956	65.88%
Republican	Marziyeh Marzi Amirizadeh	7,747	34.12%
Total votes		22,703	100%
Democratic win (new seat)			

=== District 68 ===
The new 68th district is the successor of the old 64th district. Incumbent Democrat Derrick Jackson, who had represented the 64th district since 2017, retired to run for Lieutenant Governor. Democrat Tish Naghise won the open seat.

68th district Democratic primary
Party	Candidate	Votes	%
Democratic	Tish Naghise	3,408	59.07%
Democratic	Jane Williams	2,361	40.93%
Total votes		5,769	100%

68th district general election
Party	Candidate	Votes	%
Democratic	Tish Naghise	15,114	62.61%
Republican	Stoney Mathis	9,024	37.39%
Total votes		24,138	100%
Democratic hold			

=== District 69 ===
The new 69th district is the successor of the old 63rd district. Incumbent Democrat Debra Bazemore, who had represented the 63rd district since 2017, was re-elected here.

69th district Democratic primary
Party	Candidate	Votes	%
Democratic	Debra Bazemore (incumbent)	6,620	75.49%
Democratic	Tyriq Jackson	1,692	19.30%
Democratic	Cobie Lyrix Brown	457	5.21%
Total votes		8,769	100%

69th district general election
Party	Candidate	Votes	%
Democratic	Debra Bazemore (incumbent)	21,710	100%
Total votes		21,710	100%
Democratic hold			

=== District 70 ===
Incumbent Republican Lynn Smith had represented the 70th district and its predecessors since 1997.

70th district Republican primary
Party	Candidate	Votes	%
Republican	Lynn Smith (incumbent)	6,253	86.34%
Republican	Angel Nunez	989	13.66%
Total votes		7,242	100%

70th district general election
Party	Candidate	Votes	%
Republican	Lynn Smith (incumbent)	12,953	64.96%
Democratic	Calvin Louis Anderson Jr.	6,987	35.04%
Total votes		19,940	100%
Republican hold			

=== District 71 ===
The new 71st district is the successor to the old 68th district. Incumbent Republican J. Collins, who had represented the 68th district since 2017, was re-elected here.

71st district general election
Party	Candidate	Votes	%
Republican	J. Collins (incumbent)	15,289	71.23%
Democratic	Afoma Eguh Okafor	6,175	28.77%
Total votes		21,464	100%
Republican hold			

=== District 72 ===
The new 72nd district is the successor of the old 69th district. Incumbent Republican Randy Nix, who had represented the 69th district since 2007, did not seek re-election. Republican David Huddleston won the open seat.

72nd district general election
Party	Candidate	Votes	%
Republican	David Huddleston	18,256	100%
Total votes		18,256	100%
Republican hold			

=== District 73 ===
The new 73rd district includes the homes of incumbent Republicans Philip Singleton, who had represented the 71st district since 2019, and Josh Bonner, who had represented the 72nd district since 2017. Singleton retired and Bonner was re-elected here.

73rd district general election
Party	Candidate	Votes	%
Republican	Josh Bonner (incumbent)	24,239	100%
Total votes		24,239	100%
Republican hold			

=== District 74 ===
The new 74th district is the successor of the old 73rd district. Incumbent Republican Karen Mathiak, who had represented the 73rd district since 2017, was re-elected here.

74th district Democratic primary
Party	Candidate	Votes	%
Democratic	William Harris	2,025	64.16%
Democratic	Errol Mitchell	1,131	35.84%
Total votes		3,156	100%

74th district Republican primary
Party	Candidate	Votes	%
Republican	Karen Mathiak (incumbent)	6,412	66.38%
Republican	David Ballard	3,248	33.62%
Total votes		9,660	100%

74th district general election
Party	Candidate	Votes	%
Republican	Karen Mathiak (incumbent)	16,332	63.70%
Democratic	William Harris	9,306	36.30%
Total votes		25,638	100%
Republican hold			

=== District 75 ===
Incumbent Democrat Mike Glanton had represented the 75th district since 2013.

75th district Democratic primary
Party	Candidate	Votes	%
Democratic	Mike Glanton (incumbent)	4,015	70.99%
Democratic	Herman "Drew" Andrews	1,641	29.01%
Total votes		5,656	100%

75th district general election
Party	Candidate	Votes	%
Democratic	Mike Glanton (incumbent)	14,894	88.55%
Republican	Della Ashley	1,926	11.45%
Total votes		16,820	100%
Democratic hold			

=== District 76 ===
Incumbent Democrat Sandra Scott had represented the 76th district since 2011.

76th district general election
Party	Candidate	Votes	%
Democratic	Sandra Scott (incumbent)	15,564	100%
Total votes		15,564	100%
Democratic hold			

=== District 77 ===
Incumbent Democrat Rhonda Burnough had represented the 77th district since 2017.

77th district general election
Party	Candidate	Votes	%
Democratic	Rhonda Burnough (incumbent)	14,414	100%
Total votes		14,414	100%
Democratic hold			

=== District 78 ===
Incumbent Democrat Demetrius Douglas had represented the 78th district since 2013.

78th district Democratic primary
Party	Candidate	Votes	%
Democratic	Demetrius Douglas (incumbent)	5,533	74.21%
Democratic	Attania Jean-Funny	1,923	25.79%
Total votes		7,456	100%

78th district general election
Party	Candidate	Votes	%
Democratic	Demetrius Douglas (incumbent)	19,065	100%
Total votes		19,065	100%
Democratic hold			

=== District 79 ===
The new 79th district is the successor of the old 74th district. Incumbent Democrat Yasmin Neal, who had represented the 74th district since 2021, was re-elected here.

79th district general election
Party	Candidate	Votes	%
Democratic	Yasmin Neal (incumbent)	12,009	100%
Total votes		12,009	100%
Democratic hold			

=== District 80 ===
The new 80th district is the successor of the old 79th district. Incumbent Democrat Mike Wilensky, who had represented the 79th district since 2019, did not seek re-election. Democrat Long Tran won the open seat.

80th district general election
Party	Candidate	Votes	%
Democratic	Long Tran	12,096	57.13%
Republican	Brian Anderson	9,077	42.87%
Total votes		21,173	100%
Democratic hold			

=== District 81 ===
Incumbent Democrat Scott Holcomb had represented the 81st district since 2011.

81st district general election
Party	Candidate	Votes	%
Democratic	Scott Holcomb (incumbent)	16,015	70.00%
Republican	Mary Williams Benefield	6,865	30.00%
Total votes		22,880	100%
Democratic hold			

=== District 82 ===
Incumbent Democrat Mary Margaret Oliver had represented the 82nd district and its predecessors since 2003.

82nd district general election
Party	Candidate	Votes	%
Democratic	Mary Margaret Oliver (incumbent)	22,609	81.76%
Republican	Jenine Milum	5,045	18.24%
Total votes		27,654	100%
Democratic hold			

=== District 83 ===
The new 83rd district includes part of northeastern DeKalb County, including Brookhaven and Chamblee. Democrat Karen Lupton won the open seat.

83rd district general election
Party	Candidate	Votes	%
Democratic	Karen Lupton	10,972	60.94%
Republican	Catherine Bernard	7,033	39.06%
Total votes		18,005	100%
Democratic win (new seat)			

=== District 84 ===
Incumbent Democrat Renitta Shannon had represented the 84th district since 2017. Shannon retired to run for Lieutenant Governor. Democrat Omari Crawford won the open seat.

84th district Democratic primary
Party	Candidate	Votes	%
Democratic	Omari Crawford	9,493	81.63%
Democratic	Maurice Raeford	2,137	18.37%
Total votes		11,630	100%

84th district general election
Party	Candidate	Votes	%
Democratic	Omari Crawford	26,549	100%
Total votes		26,549	100%
Democratic hold			

=== District 85 ===
Incumbent Democrat Karla Drenner had represented the 85th district and its predecessors since 2001.

85th district Democratic primary
Party	Candidate	Votes	%
Democratic	Karla Drenner (incumbent)	4,746	73.86%
Democratic	Joscelyn C. O'Neil	1,680	26.14%
Total votes		6,426	100%

85th district general election
Party	Candidate	Votes	%
Democratic	Karla Drenner (incumbent)	16,743	100%
Total votes		16,743	100%
Democratic hold			

=== District 86 ===
Incumbent Democrat Zulma Lopez had represented the 86th district since 2021. Lopez did not seek re-election and fellow Democrat Imani Barnes won the open seat.

86th district Democratic primary
Party	Candidate	Votes	%
Democratic	Imani Barnes	3,094	48.40%
Democratic	Jacqueline Adams	2,904	45.42%
Democratic	Marvis McDaniel Ivey	395	6.18%
Total votes		6,393	100%

86th district Democratic primary run-off election, 2022
Party	Candidate	Votes	%
Democratic	Imani Barnes	1,942	62.56%
Democratic	Jacqueline Adams	1,162	37.44%
Total votes		3,104	100%

86th district general election
Party	Candidate	Votes	%
Democratic	Imani Barnes	16,519	89.25%
Republican	Lisa Y. Kinnemoore	1,990	10.75%
Total votes		18,509	100%
Democratic hold			

=== District 87 ===
Incumbent Democrat Viola Davis had represented the 87th district since 2019.

87th district general election
Party	Candidate	Votes	%
Democratic	Viola Davis (incumbent)	17,795	100%
Total votes		17,795	100%
Democratic hold			

=== District 88 ===
Incumbent Democrat Billy Mitchell had represented the 88th district anfd its predecessors since 2005.

88th district Democratic primary
Party	Candidate	Votes	%
Democratic	Billy Mitchell (incumbent)	4,576	64.75%
Democratic	Gabrielle Rogers	2,491	35.25%
Total votes		7,067	100%

88th district general election
Party	Candidate	Votes	%
Democratic	Billy Mitchell (incumbent)	16,903	82.40%
Republican	William Park Freeman	3,610	17.60%
Total votes		20,513	100%
Democratic hold			

=== District 89 ===
The new 89th district is the successor of the old 83rd district. Incumbent Democrat Becky Evans, who had represented the 83rd district since 2019, was re-elected here.

89th district general election
Party	Candidate	Votes	%
Democratic	Becky Evans (incumbent)	25,137	91.48%
Republican	Rick Sheppard	2,340	8.52%
Total votes		27,477	100%
Democratic hold			

=== District 90 ===
The new 90th district is the successor of the old 89th district. Incumbent Democrat Bee Nguyen, who had represented the 89th district since 2017, retired to run for Secretary of State. Democrat Saira Draper won the open seat.

90th district Democratic primary
Party	Candidate	Votes	%
Democratic	Saira Draper	4,788	42.56%
Democratic	Michelle Shreiner	3,877	34.47%
Democratic	Bentley Hudgins	1,627	14.46%
Democratic	Peter Hubbard	659	5.86%
Democratic	Stewart Parnacott	298	2.65%
Total votes		11,249	100%

90th district Democratic primary run-off election, 2022
Party	Candidate	Votes	%
Democratic	Saira Draper	3,470	54.30%
Democratic	Michelle Shreiner	2,921	45.70%
Total votes		6,391	100%

90th district general election
Party	Candidate	Votes	%
Democratic	Saira Draper	27,228	93.50%
Republican	Jodi Diodati	1,892	6.50%
Total votes		29,120	100%
Democratic hold			

=== District 91 ===
The new 91st district is the successor of the old 90th district. Incumbent Democrat Angela Moore, who had represented the 90th district since her appointment on March 16, 2021, was re-elected here.

91st district Democratic primary
Party	Candidate	Votes	%
Democratic	Angela Moore (incumbent)	8,255	89.73%
Democratic	Greg Shealey	945	10.27%
Total votes		9,200	100%

91st district general election
Party	Candidate	Votes	%
Democratic	Angela Moore (incumbent)	21,076	100%
Total votes		21,076	100%
Democratic hold			

=== District 92 ===
The new 92nd district is the successor of the old 91st district. Incumbent Democrat Rhonda Taylor, who had represented the 91st district since 2021, was re-elected here.

92nd district Democratic primary
Party	Candidate	Votes	%
Democratic	Rhonda Taylor (incumbent)	6,853	84.21%
Democratic	Demoine Kinney	1,285	15.79%
Total votes		8,138	100%

92nd district general election
Party	Candidate	Votes	%
Democratic	Rhonda Taylor (incumbent)	20,755	100%
Total votes		20,755	100%
Democratic hold			

=== District 93 ===
The new 93rd district is the successor of the old 92nd district. Incumbent Democrat Doreen Carter, who had represented the 92nd district since 2015, was re-elected here.

93rd district Democratic primary
Party	Candidate	Votes	%
Democratic	Doreen Carter (incumbent)	4,192	77.63%
Democratic	Laklieshia Izzard	1,208	22.37%
Total votes		5,400	100%

93rd district general election
Party	Candidate	Votes	%
Democratic	Doreen Carter (incumbent)	15,336	100%
Total votes		15,336	100%
Democratic hold			

=== District 94 ===
Incumbent Democrat Karen Bennett had represented the 94th district since 2013.

94th district general election
Party	Candidate	Votes	%
Democratic	Karen Bennett (incumbent)	19,663	100%
Total votes		19,663	100%
Democratic hold			

=== District 95 ===
The new 95th district is the successor to the old 93rd district. Incumbent Democrat Dar'shun Kendrick, who had represented the 93rd district and its predecessors since 2011, was re-elected here.

95th district general election
Party	Candidate	Votes	%
Democratic	Dar'shun Kendrick (incumbent)	18,050	79.08%
Republican	Dexter Dawston	4,774	20.92%
Total votes		22,824	100%
Democratic hold			

=== District 96 ===
Incumbent Democrat Pedro Marin, who had represented the 96th district and its predecessors since 2003.

96th district general election
Party	Candidate	Votes	%
Democratic	Pedro Marin (incumbent)	7,314	65.59%
Republican	Daelen Lowry	3,837	34.41%
Total votes		11,151	100%
Democratic hold			

=== District 97 ===
The new 97th district is the successor of the old 95th district. Incumbent Democrat Beth Moore, who had represented the 95th district since 2019, retired to run for State Senate. Democrat Ruwa Romman won the open seat.

97th district Democratic primary
Party	Candidate	Votes	%
Democratic	Ruwa Romman	2,168	57.72%
Democratic	Jt Wu	1,588	42.28%
Total votes		3,756	100%

97th district general election
Party	Candidate	Votes	%
Democratic	Ruwa Romman	10,538	57.69%
Republican	John Chan	7,729	42.31%
Total votes		18,267	100%
Democratic hold			

=== District 98 ===
The new 98th district is the successor of the old 99th district. Incumbent Democrat Marvin Lim, who had represented the 99th district since 2021, was re-elected here.

98th district general election
Party	Candidate	Votes	%
Democratic	Marvin Lim (incumbent)	6,064	100%
Total votes		6,064	100%
Democratic hold			

=== District 99 ===
The new 99th district includes part of Gwinnett County. Most of its constituents came from the former 97th district. Republican Matt Reeves won the open seat.

99th district general election
Party	Candidate	Votes	%
Republican	Matt Reeves	11,523	54.80%
Democratic	Om Duggal	9,503	45.20%
Total votes		21,026	100%
Republican win (new seat)			

=== District 100 ===
The new 100th district includes the homes of Incumbent Republicans Bonnie Rich, who had represented the 97th district since 2019, and David Clark, who had represented the 98th district since 2015. Clark defeated Rich in the Republican primary and went on to win the general election.

100th district Republican primary
Party	Candidate	Votes	%
Republican	David Clark (incumbent)	4,283	59.25%
Republican	Bonnie Rich (incumbent)	2,946	40.75%
Total votes		7,229	100%

100th district general election
Party	Candidate	Votes	%
Republican	David Clark (incumbent)	15,015	64.81%
Democratic	Louisa Shell Jackson	8,152	35.19%
Total votes		23,167	100%
Republican hold			

=== District 101 ===
The new 101st district is the successor of the old 102nd district. Incumbent Democrat Gregg Kennard, who had represented the 102nd district since 2019, was re-elected here.

101st district general election
Party	Candidate	Votes	%
Democratic	Gregg Kennard (incumbent)	10,681	55.26%
Republican	Zach Procter	8,646	44.74%
Total votes		19,327	100%
Democratic hold			

=== District 102 ===
The new 102nd district includes part of Gwinnett County, including most of Lawrenceville. Democrat Gabe Okoye won the open seat.

102nd district general election
Party	Candidate	Votes	%
Democratic	Gabe Okoye	10,839	64.60%
Republican	Wesley S. Harding	5,939	35.40%
Total votes		16,778	100%
Democratic win (new seat)			

=== District 103 ===
The new 103rd district is located in Gwinnett County and had no incumbent. Republican Soo Hong won the open seat.

103rd district general election
Party	Candidate	Votes	%
Republican	Soo Hong	13,277	61.40%
Democratic	Ernie Anaya	8,346	38.60%
Total votes		21,623	100%
Republican win (new seat)			

=== District 104 ===
Incumbent Republican Chuck Efstration had represented the 104th district since 2013.

104th district general election
Party	Candidate	Votes	%
Republican	Chuck Efstration (incumbent)	14,168	65.87%
Democratic	Patrick J. Reinert	7,340	34.13%
Total votes		21,508	100%
Republican hold			

=== District 105 ===
The new 105th district includes parts of Gwinnett County and had no incumbent. Democrat Farooq Mughal won the open seat.

105th district general election
Party	Candidate	Votes	%
Democratic	Farooq Mughal	10,505	51.73%
Republican	Sandy Donatucci	9,804	48.27%
Total votes		20,309	100%
Democratic win (new seat)			

=== District 106 ===
The new 106th district includes the homes of incumbent Democrats Rebecca Mitchell, who had represented the 106th district since 2021, and Shelly Hutchinson, who had represented the 107th district since 2019. Hutchinson defeated Mitchell in the Democratic primary and went on to win the general election.

106th district Democratic primary
Party	Candidate	Votes	%
Democratic	Shelly Hutchinson (incumbent)	3,016	58.59%
Democratic	Rebecca Mitchell (incumbent)	2,132	41.41%
Total votes		5,148	100%

106th district general election
Party	Candidate	Votes	%
Democratic	Shelly Hutchinson (incumbent)	13,151	59.25%
Republican	Preston A. Wren	9,043	40.75%
Total votes		22,194	100%
Democratic hold			

=== District 107 ===
The new 107th district is the successor of the old 101st district. Incumbent Democrat Sam Park, who had represented the 101st district since 2017, was re-elected here.

107th district general election
Party	Candidate	Votes	%
Democratic	Sam Park (incumbent)	9,438	68.23%
Republican	Hai Cao	4,394	31.77%
Total votes		13,832	100%
Democratic hold			

=== District 108 ===
Incumbent Democrat Jasmine Clark had represented the 108th district since 2019.

108th district general election
Party	Candidate	Votes	%
Democratic	Jasmine Clark (incumbent)	11,153	52.10%
Republican	Johnny Crist	10,253	47.90%
Total votes		21,406	100%
Democratic hold			

=== District 109 ===
The new 109th district is the successor of the old 100th district. Incumbent Democrat Dewey McClain, who had represented the 100th district since 2013, was re-elected here.

109th district general election
Party	Candidate	Votes	%
Democratic	Dewey McClain (incumbent)	8,876	100%
Total votes		8,876	100%
Democratic hold			

=== District 110 ===
The new 110th district is the successor of the old 105th district. Incumbent Democrat Donna McLeod, who had represented the 105th district since 2019, retired to run for Congress. Democrat Segun Adeyina won the open seat.

110th district general election
Party	Candidate	Votes	%
Democratic	Segun Adeyina	18,012	100%
Total votes		18,012	100%
Democratic hold			

=== District 111 ===
The new 111th district is the successor of the old 114th district. Incumbent Republican Tom Kirby, who had represented the 114th district and its predecessors since 2012, did not seek re-election. Republican Reynaldo Martinez won the open seat.

111th district general election
Party	Candidate	Votes	%
Republican	Reynaldo Martinez	16,074	65.18%
Democratic	Ryan Cox	8,586	34.82%
Total votes		24,660	100%
Republican hold			

=== District 112 ===
The new 112th district is the successor of the old 115th district. Incumbent Republican Bruce Williamson, who had represented the 115th district and its predecessors since 2011.

112th district general election
Party	Candidate	Votes	%
Republican	Bruce Williamson (incumbent)	20,411	78.99%
Democratic	Debbie Reed	5,429	21.01%
Total votes		25,840	100%
Republican hold			

=== District 113 ===
Incumbent Democrat Sharon Henderson had represented the 113th district since 2021.

113th district Democratic primary
Party	Candidate	Votes	%
Democratic	Sharon Henderson (incumbent)	4,384	73.82%
Democratic	Billie Boyd-Cox	1,555	26.18%
Total votes		5,939	100%

113th district general election
Party	Candidate	Votes	%
Democratic	Sharon Henderson (incumbent)	17,290	100%
Total votes		17,290	100%
Democratic hold			

=== District 114 ===
The new 114th district is the successor of the old 112th district. Incumbent Republican Dave Belton, who had represented the 112th district since 2015, did not seek re-election. Republican Tim Fleming won the open seat.

114th district Republican primary
Party	Candidate	Votes	%
Republican	Tim Fleming	6,778	64.74%
Republican	Wendell D. McNeal	3,691	35.26%
Total votes		10,469	100%

114th district general election
Party	Candidate	Votes	%
Republican	Tim Fleming	18,854	70.93%
Democratic	Malcolm Adams	7,727	29.07%
Total votes		26,581	100%
Republican hold			

=== District 115 ===
The new 115th district is the successor of the old 109th district. Incumbent Democrat Regina Lewis-Ward, who had represented the 109th district since 2021, was re-elected here.

115th district general election
Party	Candidate	Votes	%
Democratic	Regina Lewis-Ward (incumbent)	17,703	100%
Total votes		17,703	100%
Democratic hold			

=== District 116 ===
The new 116th district is the successor of the old 111th district. Incumbent Democrat El-Mahdi Holly, who had represented the 111th district since 2019, was re-elected here.

116th district general election
Party	Candidate	Votes	%
Democratic	El-Mahdi Holly (incumbent)	16,706	73.33%
Republican	Bruce Bennington	6,075	26.67%
Total votes		22,781	100%
Democratic hold			

=== District 117 ===
The new 117th district includes parts of eastern Henry County as well as part of northeastern Spalding County. Republican Lauren Daniel won the open seat.

117th district Democratic primary
Party	Candidate	Votes	%
Democratic	Demetrius Rucker	2,588	54.59%
Democratic	Mya Speller Cullins	2,153	45.41%
Total votes		4,741	100%

117th district Republican primary
Party	Candidate	Votes	%
Republican	Lauren Daniel	2,854	39.40%
Republican	Noelle Kahaian	2,121	29.28%
Republican	Clayton Carte	1,264	17.45%
Republican	Lester D. Clark	1,004	13.86%
Total votes		7,243	100%

117th district Republican primary run-off election, 2022
Party	Candidate	Votes	%
Republican	Lauren Daniel	1,743	50.32%
Republican	Noelle Kahaian	1,721	49.68%
Total votes		3,464	100%

117th district general election
Party	Candidate	Votes	%
Republican	Lauren Daniel	13,335	50.73%
Democratic	Demetrius Rucker	12,949	49.27%
Total votes		26,284	100%
Republican win (new seat)			

=== District 118 ===
The new 118th district includes the homes of incumbent Republicans Clint Crowe, who had represented the 110th district since 2021, and Susan Holmes, who had represented the 129th district and its predecessors since 2011. Holmes retired and Crowe was re-elected here.

118th district general election
Party	Candidate	Votes	%
Republican	Clint Crowe (incumbent)	18,127	74.71%
Democratic	Sharonda Bell	6,137	25.29%
Total votes		24,264	100%
Republican hold			

=== District 119 ===
The new 119th district is the successor of the old 116th district. Incumbent Republican Terry England, who had represented the 116th district and its predecessors since 2005, did not seek re-election. Republican Danny Rampey won the open seat.

119th district Republican primary
Party	Candidate	Votes	%
Republican	Danny Rampey	6,543	82.74%
Republican	Marcus Ray	1,365	17.26%
Total votes		7,908	100%

119th district general election
Party	Candidate	Votes	%
Republican	Danny Rampey	18,484	100%
Total votes		18,484	100%
Republican hold			

=== District 120 ===
The new 120th district is the successor of the old 117th district. Incumbent Republican Houston Gaines, who had represented the 117th district since 2019, was re-elected here.

120th district general election
Party	Candidate	Votes	%
Republican	Houston Gaines (incumbent)	15,008	61.17%
Democratic	Mokah Jasmine Johnson	9,525	38.83%
Total votes		24,533	100%
Republican hold			

=== District 121 ===
The new 121st district is the successor of the old 119th district. Incumbent Republican Marcus Wiedower, who had represented the 119th district since 2019, was re-elected here.

121st district general election
Party	Candidate	Votes	%
Republican	Marcus Wiedower (incumbent)	15,898	60.41%
Democratic	Jeff Auerbach	10,419	39.59%
Total votes		26,317	100%
Republican hold			

=== District 122 ===
The new 122nd district is the successor of the old 118th district. Incumbent Democrat Spencer Frye, who had represented the 118th district since 2013, was re-elected here.

122nd district general election
Party	Candidate	Votes	%
Democratic	Spencer Frye (incumbent)	12,440	100%
Total votes		12,440	100%
Democratic hold			

=== District 123 ===
The new 123rd district is the successor of the old 33rd district. Incumbent Republican Rob Leverett, who had represented the 33rd district since 2021, was re-elected here.

123rd district general election
Party	Candidate	Votes	%
Republican	Rob Leverett (incumbent)	20,584	100%
Total votes		20,584	100%
Republican hold			

=== District 124 ===
The new 124th district is the successor of the old 120th district. Incumbent Republican Trey Rhodes, who had represented the 120th district since 2015, was re-elected here.

124th district general election
Party	Candidate	Votes	%
Republican	Trey Rhodes (incumbent)	18,568	65.85%
Democratic	Kat Howkins	9,630	34.15%
Total votes		28,198	100%
Republican hold			

=== District 125 ===
The new 125th district is the successor of the old 121st district. Incumbent Republican Barry Fleming, who had represented the 121st district since 2013, was re-elected here.

125th district general election
Party	Candidate	Votes	%
Republican	Barry Fleming (incumbent)	18,489	100%
Total votes		18,489	100%
Republican hold			

=== District 126 ===
Incumbent Democrat Gloria Frazier had represented the 126th district and its predecessors since 2007.

126th district general election
Party	Candidate	Votes	%
Democratic	Gloria Frazier (incumbent)	12,522	59.26%
Republican	William C. Harris	8,610	40.74%
Total votes		21,132	100%
Democratic hold			

=== District 127 ===
The new 127th district is the successor of the old 123rd district. Incumbent Republican Mark Newton, who had represented the 123rd district since 2017, was re-elected here unopposed.

127th district general election
Party	Candidate	Votes	%
Republican	Mark Newton (incumbent)	20,459	100%
Total votes		20,459	100%
Republican hold			

=== District 128 ===
Incumbent Democrat Mack Jackson had represented the 128th district since 2009.

128th district general election
Party	Candidate	Votes	%
Democratic	Mack Jackson (incumbent	16,313	100%
Total votes		16,313	100%
Democratic hold			

=== District 129 ===
The new 129th district is the successor of the old 124th district. Incumbent Democrat Henry Howard, who had represented the 124th district since 2007, was re-elected here unopposed.

129th district general election
Party	Candidate	Votes	%
Democratic	Henry Howard (incumbent)	12,803	100%
Total votes		12,803	100%
Democratic hold			

=== District 130 ===
The new 130th district is the successor of the old 125th district. Incumbent Democrat Sheila Nelson, who had represented the 125th district since 2017, did not seek re-election. Democrat Lynn Gadney won the open seat.

130th district general election
Party	Candidate	Votes	%
Democratic	Lynn Gladney	11,645	67.28%
Republican	Dan Swenson	5,662	32.72%
Total votes		17,307	100%
Democratic hold			

=== District 131 ===
The new 131st district is the successor of the old 122nd district. Incumbent Republican Jodi Lott, who had represented the 122nd district since 2015, was re-elected here.

131st district general election
Party	Candidate	Votes	%
Republican	Jodi Lott (incumbent)	20,861	100%
Total votes		20,861	100%
Republican hold			

=== District 132 ===
The new 132nd district is the successor of the old 127th district. Incumbent Democrat Brian Prince, who had represented the 127th district since 2013, was re-elected here.

132nd district Democratic primary
Party	Candidate	Votes	%
Democratic	Brian Prince (incumbent)	3,566	57.61%
Democratic	Traci "Acree" George	2,624	42.39%
Total votes		6,190	100%

132nd district general election
Party	Candidate	Votes	%
Democratic	Brian Prince (incumbent)	14,330	100%
Total votes		14,330	100%
Democratic hold			

=== District 133 ===
The new 133rd district is the successor of the old 145th district. Incumbent Republican Rick Williams, who had represented the 145th district since 2017, retired to run for State Senate. Republican Kenneth Vance won the open seat.

133rd district general election
Party	Candidate	Votes	%
Republican	Kenneth Vance	11,896	57.50%
Democratic	Hoganne Harrison Walton	8,794	42.50%
Total votes		20,690	100%
Republican hold			

=== District 134 ===
The new 134th district is the successor of the old 130th district. Incumbent Republican David Knight, who had represented the 130th district and its predecessors since 2005, was re-elected here.

134th district general election
Party	Candidate	Votes	%
Republican	David Knight (incumbent)	14,053	66.47%
Democratic	Anthony Dickson	7,089	33.53%
Total votes		21,142	100%
Republican hold			

=== District 135 ===
The new 135th district is the successor of the old 131st district. Incumbent Republican Beth Camp, who had represented the 131st district since 2021, was re-elected here.

135th district Republican primary
Party	Candidate	Votes	%
Republican	Beth Camp (incumbent)	8,372	79.66%
Republican	Dan Brue	2,138	20.34%
Total votes		10,510	100%

135th district general election
Party	Candidate	Votes	%
Republican	Beth Camp (incumbent)	21,512	100%
Total votes		21,512	100%
Republican hold			

=== District 136 ===
The new 136th district is the successor of the old 132nd district. Incumbent Republican David Jenkins, who had represented the 132nd district since 2021, was re-elected here.

136th district Republican primary
Party	Candidate	Votes	%
Republican	David Jenkins (incumbent)	6,617	73.92%
Republican	Kenneth Murphy	2,335	26.08%
Total votes		8,952	100%

136th district general election
Party	Candidate	Votes	%
Republican	David Jenkins (incumbent)	20,337	100%
Total votes		20,337	100%
Republican hold			

=== District 137 ===
Incumbent Democrat Debbie Buckner had represented the 137th district and its predecessors since 2003.

137th district general election
Party	Candidate	Votes	%
Democratic	Debbie Buckner (incumbent)	12,712	60.98%
Republican	Justin Rickett	8,133	39.02%
Total votes		20,845	100%
Democratic hold			

=== District 138 ===
The new 138th district is the successor of the old 133rd district. Incumbent Republican Vance Smith, who had represented the 133rd district since 2019, was re-elected here.

138th district general election
Party	Candidate	Votes	%
Republican	Vance Smith (incumbent)	22,067	100%
Total votes		22,067	100%
Republican hold			

=== District 139 ===
The new 139th district is the successor of the old 134th district. Incumbent Republican Richard Smith, who had represented the 134th district since 2005, was re-elected here.

139th district general election
Party	Candidate	Votes	%
Republican	Richard Smith (incumbent)	18,400	100%
Total votes		18,400	100%
Republican hold			

=== District 140 ===
The new 140th district is the successor of the old 135th district. Incumbent Democrat Calvin Smyre, who had represented the 135th district and its predecessors since 1975, did not seek re-election. Democrat Tremaine Teddy Reese won the open seat.

140th district Democratic primary
Party	Candidate	Votes	%
Democratic	Tremaine Teddy Reese	2,268	58.85%
Democratic	Zeph Baker	1,586	41.15%
Total votes		3,854	100%

140th district general election
Party	Candidate	Votes	%
Democratic	Tremaine Teddy Reese	9,328	100%
Total votes		9,328	100%
Democratic hold			

=== District 141 ===
The new 141st district is the successor of the old 136th district. Incumbent Democrat Carolyn Hugley had represented the 136th district and its predecessors since 1993, was re-elected here.

141st district general election
Party	Candidate	Votes	%
Democratic	Carolyn Hugley (incumbent)	13,477	100%
Total votes		13,477	100%
Democratic hold			

=== District 142 ===
Incumbent Democrat Miriam Paris had represented the 142nd district since 2017.

142nd district general election
Party	Candidate	Votes	%
Democratic	Miriam Paris (incumbent)	15,720	100%
Total votes		15,720	100%
Democratic hold			

=== District 143 ===
Incumbent Democrat Minority Leader James Beverly had represented the 143rd district and its predecessors since 2011.

143rd district general election
Party	Candidate	Votes	%
Democratic	James Beverly (incumbent)	14,531	100%
Total votes		14,531	100%
Democratic hold			

=== District 144 ===
The new 144th district is the successor of the old 141st district. Incumbent Republican Dale Washburn, who had represented the th district since 2019, was re-elected here.

144th district Republican primary
Party	Candidate	Votes	%
Republican	Dale Washburn (incumbent)	8,425	84.30%
Republican	Jayson Stonne	1,569	15.70%
Total votes		9,994	100%

144th district general election
Party	Candidate	Votes	%
Republican	Dale Washburn (incumbent)	17,427	65.74%
Democratic	Nettie B. Conner	9,082	34.26%
Total votes		26,509	100%
Republican hold			

=== District 145 ===
The new 145th district is the successor of the old 140th district. Incumbent Republican Robert Dickey, who had represented the 140th district since 2011, was re-elected here.

145th district general election
Party	Candidate	Votes	%
Republican	Robert Dickey (incumbent)	15,964	100%
Total votes		15,964	100%
Republican hold			

=== District 146 ===
Incumbent Republican Shaw Blackmon had represented the 146th district since 2015.

146th district general election
Party	Candidate	Votes	%
Republican	Shaw Blackmon (incumbent)	15,956	64.10%
Democratic	Courtney L. Driver	8,937	35.90%
Total votes		24,893	100%
Republican hold			

=== District 147 ===
Incumbent Republican Heath Clark had represented the 147th district since 2015. Clark retired and fellow Republican Bethany Ballard won the open seat.

147th district general election
Party	Candidate	Votes	%
Republican	Bethany Ballard	11,175	55.81%
Democratic	Ariel Phillips	8,848	44.19%
Total votes		20,023	100%
Republican hold			

=== District 148 ===
Incumbent Republican Noel Williams Jr. had represented the 148th district since 2019.

148th district general election
Party	Candidate	Votes	%
Republican	Noel Williams Jr. (incumbent)	17,191	100%
Total votes		17,191	100%
Republican hold			

=== District 149 ===
the new 149th district includes the homes of incumbent Republicans Robert Pruitt, who had represented the 149th district since 2021, and Danny Mathis, who had represented the 144th district since 2019. Mathis defeated Pruitt in the Republican primary election and went on to win the general election unopposed.

149th district Republican primary
Party	Candidate	Votes	%
Republican	Danny Mathis (incumbent)	5,416	56.55%
Republican	Robert Pruitt (incumbent)	4,162	43.45%
Total votes		9,578	100%

149th district general election
Party	Candidate	Votes	%
Republican	Danny Mathis (incumbent)	17,326	100%
Total votes		17,326	100%
Republican hold			

=== District 150 ===
The new 150th district is the successor of the old 139th district. Incumbent Democrat Patty Bentley, who had represented the 139th district since 2013, was re-elected here.

150th district general election
Party	Candidate	Votes	%
Democratic	Patty Bentley (incumbent)	13,304	100%
Total votes		13,304	100%
Democratic hold			

=== District 151 ===
The new 151st district is the successor of the old 138th district. Incumbent Republican Mike Cheokas, who had represented the 138th district since 2019, was re-elected here.

151st district general election
Party	Candidate	Votes	%
Republican	Mike Cheokas (incumbent)	10,975	54.90%
Democratic	Joyce Barlow	9,015	45.10%
Total votes		19,990	100%
Republican hold			

=== District 152 ===
Incumbent Republican Bill Yearta had represented the 152nd district since 2019.

152nd district general election
Party	Candidate	Votes	%
Republican	Bill Yearta (incumbent)	19,812	100%
Total votes		19,812	100%
Republican hold			

=== District 153 ===
Incumbent Democrat CaMia Jackson had represented the 153rd district since 2019. Jackson retired and fellow Democrat David Sampson won the open seat.

153rd district Democratic primary
Party	Candidate	Votes	%
Democratic	David Sampson	4,048	75.48%
Democratic	Al Wynn	1,315	24.52%
Total votes		5,363	100%

153rd district general election
Party	Candidate	Votes	%
Democratic	David Sampson	10,843	65.10%
Republican	Tracy Taylor	5,814	34.90%
Total votes		16,657	100%
Democratic hold			

=== District 154 ===
the new 154th district includes the home of incumbent Democrat Winfred Dukes, who had represented the 154th district and its predecessors since 1997, and incumbent Republican Gerald Greene, who hagd represented the 151st district and its predecessors since 1983. Dukes retired to run for Agricultural Commissioner. Greene was re-elected here.

154th district general election
Party	Candidate	Votes	%
Republican	Gerald Greene (incumbent)	11,901	56.45%
Democratic	John Hayes	9,183	43.55%
Total votes		21,084	100%
Republican hold			

=== District 155 ===
The new 155th district is the successor of the old 150th district. Incumbent Republican Matt Hatchett, who had represented the 150th district and its predecessors since 2011, was re-elected here.

155th district general election
Party	Candidate	Votes	%
Republican	Matt Hatchett (incumbent)	17,979	100%
Total votes		17,979	100%
Republican hold			

=== District 156 ===
Incumbent Republican Leesa Hagan had represented the 156th district since 2021.

156th district general election
Party	Candidate	Votes	%
Republican	Leesa Hagan (incumbent)	13,766	75.04%
Democratic	Lethia J. Kittrell	4,579	24.96%
Total votes		18,345	100%
Republican hold			

=== District 157 ===
Incumbent Republican Bill Werkheiser had represented the 157th district since 2015.

157th district general election
Party	Candidate	Votes	%
Republican	Bill Werkheiser (incumbent)	15,802	100%
Total votes		15,802	100%
Republican hold			

=== District 158 ===
Incumbent Republican Butch Parrish had represented the 158th district and its predecessors since 1985.

158th district general election
Party	Candidate	Votes	%
Republican	Butch Parrish (incumbent)	13,968	71.45%
Democratic	Madeline Ryan Smith	5,580	28.55%
Total votes		19,548	100%
Republican hold			

=== District 159 ===
Incumbent Republican Majority Leader Jon Burns had represented the 159th district and its predecessors since 2005.

159th district general election
Party	Candidate	Votes	%
Republican	Jon Burns (incumbent)	19,114	100%
Total votes		19,114	100%
Republican hold			

=== District 160 ===
Incumbent Republican Jan Tankersley had represented the 160th district since 2011. Tankersly did not seek re-election, and fellow Republican Lehman Franklin won the open seat.

160th district general election
Party	Candidate	Votes	%
Republican	Lehman Franklin	13,873	100%
Total votes		13,873	100%
Republican hold			

=== District 161 ===
Incumbent Republican Bill Hitchens had represented the 161st district since 2013.

161st district general election
Party	Candidate	Votes	%
Republican	Bill Hitchens (incumbent)	12,393	60.82%
Democratic	Margo Barbee	7,984	39.18%
Total votes		20,377	100%
Republican hold			

=== District 162 ===
Incumbent Democrat Carl Gilliard had represented the 162nd district since 2016.

162nd district Democratic primary
Party	Candidate	Votes	%
Democratic	Carl Gilliard (incumbent)	4,620	88.47%
Democratic	Fredrick Praylo	602	11.53%
Total votes		5,222	100%

162nd district general election
Party	Candidate	Votes	%
Democratic	Carl Gilliard (incumbent)	14,423	100%
Total votes		14,423	100%
Democratic hold			

=== District 163 ===
Incumbent Democrat Derek Mallow had represented the 163rd district since 2021. Mallow retired to run for State Senate, and fellow Democrat Anne Allen Westbrook won the open seat.

163rd district Democratic primary
Party	Candidate	Votes	%
Democratic	Anne Allen Westbrook	4,021	61.23%
Democratic	Weslyn "Mahogany" Bowers	2,546	38.77%
Total votes		6,567	100%

163rd district general election
Party	Candidate	Votes	%
Democratic	Anne Allen Westbrook	16,157	100%
Total votes		16,157	100%
Democratic hold			

=== District 164 ===
Incumbent Republican Ron Stephens had represented the 164th district and its predecessors since 1997.

164th district Republican primary
Party	Candidate	Votes	%
Republican	Ron Stephens (incumbent)	5,224	88.80%
Republican	Chasity Pawvlik	659	11.20%
Total votes		5,883	100%

164th district general election
Party	Candidate	Votes	%
Republican	Ron Stephens (incumbent)	12,583	58.80%
Democratic	Marcus Thompson	8,817	41.20%
Total votes		21,400	100%
Republican hold			

=== District 165 ===
Incumbent Democrat Edna Jackson had represented the 165th district since her appointment on November 10, 2021.

165th district general election
Party	Candidate	Votes	%
Democratic	Edna Jackson (incumbent)	16,169	100%
Total votes		16,169	100%
Democratic hold			

=== District 166 ===
Incumbent Republican Jesse Petrea had represented the 166th district since 2015.

166th district general election
Party	Candidate	Votes	%
Republican	Jesse Petrea (incumbent)	26,975	100%
Total votes		26,975	100%
Republican hold			

=== District 167 ===
Incumbent Republican Buddy DeLoach had represented the 167th district since 2021.

167th district general election
Party	Candidate	Votes	%
Republican	Buddy DeLoach (incumbent)	16,345	100%
Total votes		16,345	100%
Republican hold			

=== District 168 ===
Incumbent Democrat Al Williams had represented the 168th district and its predecessors since 2003.

168th district Democratic primary
Party	Candidate	Votes	%
Democratic	Al Williams (incumbent)	3,983	81.87%
Democratic	Micah Smith	882	18.13%
Total votes		4,865	100%

168th district general election
Party	Candidate	Votes	%
Democratic	Al Williams (incumbent)	12,014	100%
Total votes		12,014	100%
Democratic hold			

=== District 169 ===
The new 169th district includes the homes of incumbent Republicans Dominic LaRiccia, who had represented the 169th district since 2015, and Clay Pirkle, who had represented the 155th district since 2015. LaRiccia retired and Pirkle was re-elected here.

169th district general election
Party	Candidate	Votes	%
Republican	Clay Pirkle (incumbent)	13,846	74.62%
Democratic	Mickey Brockington	4,709	25.38%
Total votes		18,555	100%
Republican hold			

=== District 170 ===
Incumbent Republican Penny Houston had represented the 170th district and its predecessors since 1997.

170th district general election
Party	Candidate	Votes	%
Republican	Penny Houston (incumbent)	15,723	100%
Total votes		15,723	100%
Republican hold			

=== District 171 ===
Incumbent Republican Joe Campbell had represented the 171st district since 2020.

171st district general election
Party	Candidate	Votes	%
Republican	Joe Campbell (incumbent)	15,238	100%
Total votes		15,238	100%
Republican hold			

=== District 172 ===
Incumbent Republican Sam Watson had represented the 172nd district since 2013.

172nd district general election
Party	Candidate	Votes	%
Republican	Sam Watson (incumbent)	14,574	100%
Total votes		14,574	100%
Republican hold			

=== District 173 ===
Incumbent Republican Darlene Taylor had represented the 173rd district since 2011.

173rd district general election
Party	Candidate	Votes	%
Republican	Darlene Taylor (incumbent)	13,257	63.99%
Democratic	Keith L. Jenkins Sr.	7,461	36.01%
Total votes		20,718	100%
Republican hold			

=== District 174 ===
Incumbent Republican John Corbett had represented the 174th district since 2015.

174th district general election
Party	Candidate	Votes	%
Republican	John Corbett (incumbent)	16,354	100%
Total votes		16,354	100%
Republican hold			

=== District 175 ===
Incumbent Republican John LaHood had represented the 175th district since 2018.

175th district Republican primary
Party	Candidate	Votes	%
Republican	John LaHood (incumbent)	6,379	81.35%
Republican	Bill Blanchard	1,462	18.65%
Total votes		7,841	100%

175th district general election
Party	Candidate	Votes	%
Republican	John LaHood (incumbent)	17,986	100%
Total votes		17,986	100%
Republican hold			

=== District 176 ===
Incumbent Republican James Burchett had represented the 176th district since 2019.

176th district general election
Party	Candidate	Votes	%
Republican	James Burchett (incumbent)	14,316	100%
Total votes		14,316	100%
Republican hold			

=== District 177 ===
Incumbent Democrat Dexter Sharper had represented the 177th district since 2013.

177th district general election
Party	Candidate	Votes	%
Democratic	Dexter Sharper (incumbent)	10,772	100%
Total votes		10,772	100%
Democratic hold			

=== District 178 ===
Incumbent Republican Steven Meeks had represented the 178th district since 2019.

178th district Republican primary
Party	Candidate	Votes	%
Republican	Steven Meeks (incumbent)	8,760	79.03%
Republican	Cason Carbaugh	2,325	20.97%
Total votes		11,085	100%

178th district general election
Party	Candidate	Votes	%
Republican	Steven Meeks (incumbent)	19,227	100%
Total votes		19,227	100%
Republican hold			

=== District 179 ===
Incumbent Republican Don Hogan had represented the 179th district since 2017. Hogan retired and fellow Republican Rick Townsend won the open seat.

179th district Republican primary
Party	Candidate	Votes	%
Republican	Rick Townsend	3,398	39.65%
Republican	Bob Duncan	3,022	35.26%
Republican	John C. Killgallon	2,150	25.09%
Total votes		8,570	100%

179th district Republican primary run-off election, 2022
Party	Candidate	Votes	%
Republican	Rick Townsend	2,533	58.54%
Republican	Bob Duncan	1,794	41.46%
Total votes		4,327	100%

179th district general election
Party	Candidate	Votes	%
Republican	Rick Townsend	17,376	100%
Total votes		17,376	100%
Republican hold			

=== District 180 ===
Incumbent Republican Steven Sainz had represented the 180th district since 2019.

180th district Republican primary
Party	Candidate	Votes	%
Republican	Steven Sainz (incumbent)	4,903	66.88%
Republican	Cody Smith	2,428	33.12%
Total votes		7,331	100%

180th district general election
Party	Candidate	Votes	%
Republican	Steven Sainz (incumbent)	16,049	100%
Total votes		16,049	100%
Republican hold			

== See also ==
- 2022 Georgia State Senate election
- 2022 Georgia state elections
- List of Georgia state legislatures
