= Emory Dunahoo =

American politician (born 1957)

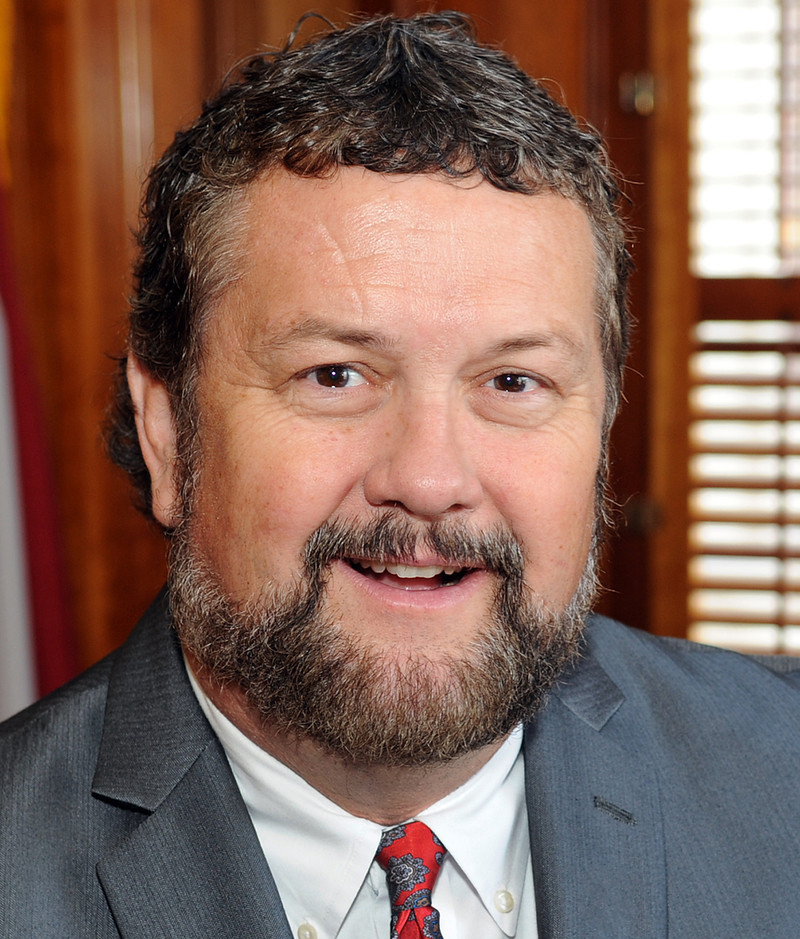
- Official portrait, 2025

Member of the Georgia House of Representatives from the 31st district
- Incumbent
- Assumed office January 9, 2023
- Preceded by: Tommy Benton

Member of the Georgia House of Representatives from the 30th district
- In office December 14, 2011 – January 9, 2023
- Succeeded by: Derrick McCollum

Personal details
- Born: Emory West Dunahoo; July 8, 1957 (age 69)
- Party: Republican

Emory West Dunahoo Jr. (born July 8, 1957) is an American politician. He has worked in the fields of logistics and poultry sales and has been elected to the Georgia House of Representatives. He is a Republican representing an area close to Gainesville and is a member of the Georgia Freedom Caucus.
