= Solomon Adesanya =

United States politician

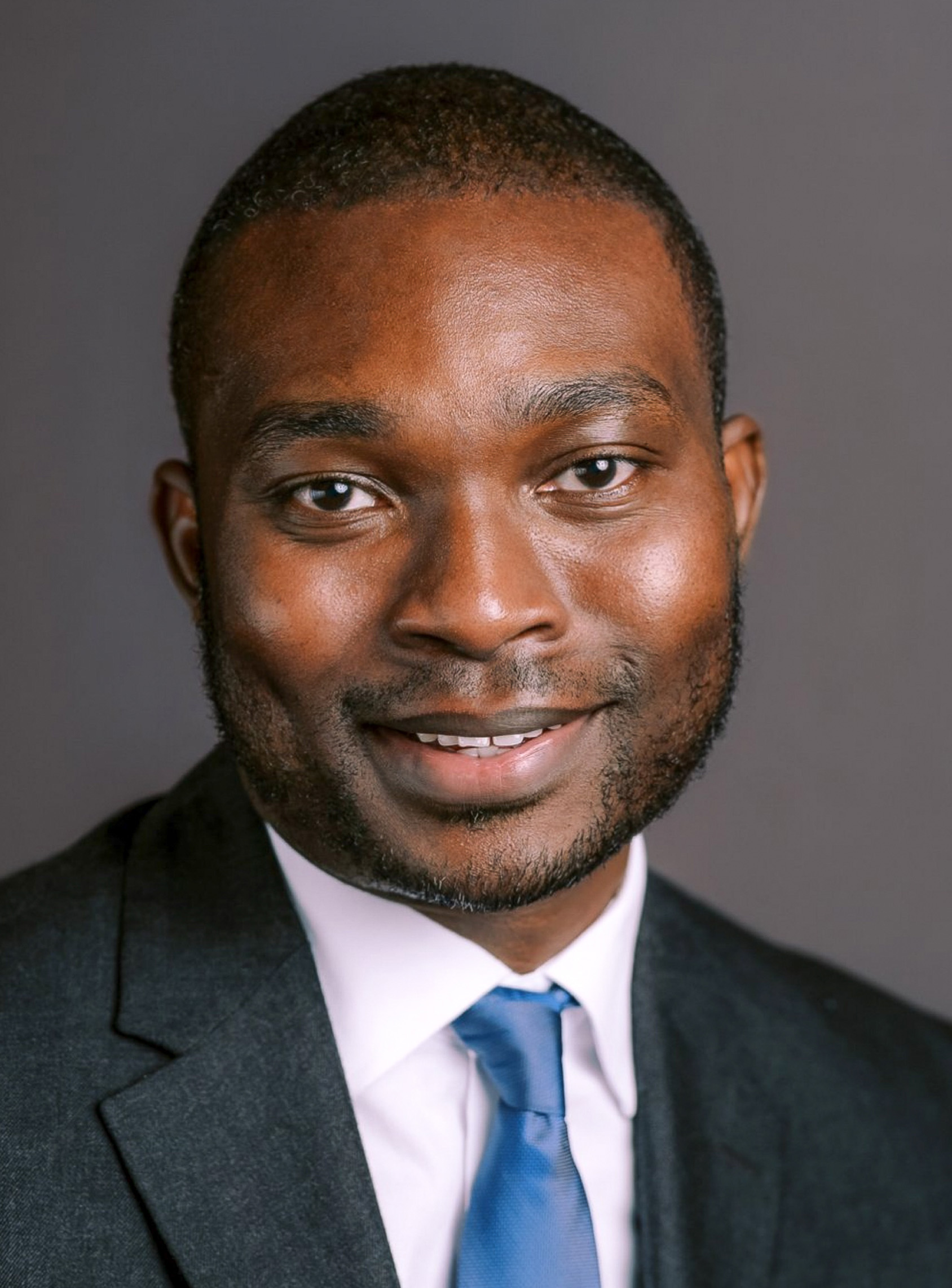
- Official portrait, 2023

Member of the Georgia House of Representatives from the 43rd district
- Incumbent
- Assumed office January 9, 2023
- Preceded by: Sharon Cooper

Personal details
- Born: July 12, 1985 (age 41) Lagos, Nigeria
- Party: Democratic
- Children: 3
- Education: Georgia State University
- Occupation: Restaurant Owner

Solomon Adesanya (born July 12, 1985) is an American businessman and a politician. He is a Democrat elected to the Georgia House of Representatives in the November 8, 2022 midterm elections, on his first attempt. He represents the 43rd District, a historically Republican district, which covers mainly Marietta and a small part of Northwest Atlanta. He also serves as House Minority Caucus Treasurer. He succeeded Sharon Cooper, who now represents the 45th District due to reapportionment. Solomon assumed office on January 9, 2023.

== Personal life ==
Adesanya is a second-generation American who lives in Marietta. Solomon is of Nigerian descent. His father Olu Adesanya (1948–2009), came to the United States from Nigeria in 1971 as a student. Solomon's father completed his undergraduate degree in chemistry at the University of Illinois, Chicago and his master's degree at the University of Illinois, Springfield. His father lived between Lagos and Chicago during the 80s and early 90s. His older brother was born in Chicago, while Solomon and his immediate brother were born in Lagos. Solomon Adesanya grew up in Lagos and on the South Side of Chicago. He attended Georgia State University and received a Masters of Public Policy. Solomon Adesanya is married with three daughters.

== Business career ==
Adesanya is an entrepreneur who owns three restaurants in the Atlanta metro area. Adesanya also owns other small businesses. Solomon Adesanya estimated net worth is $1.4 million.
