= Long Tran =

American politician

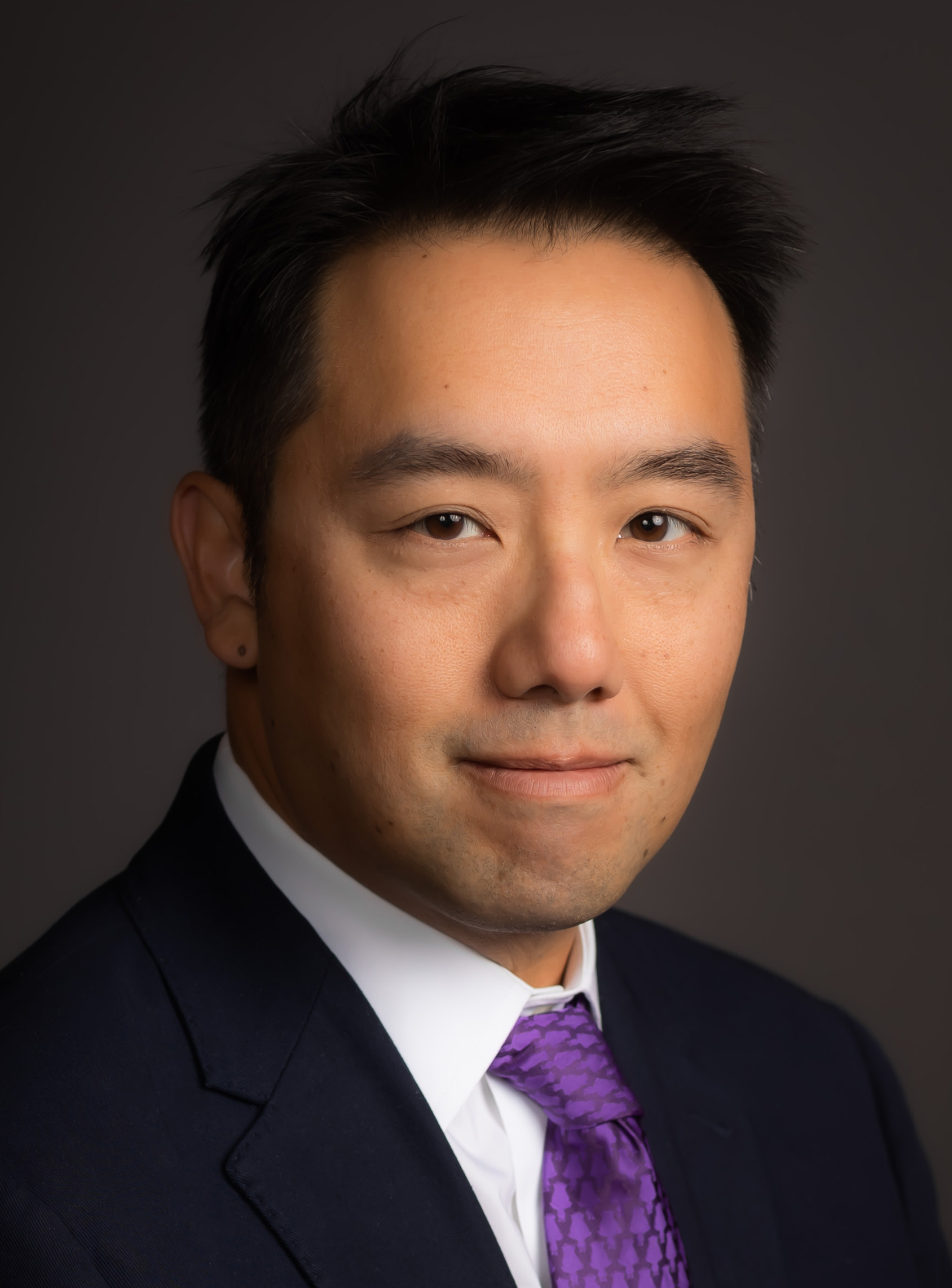
- Official portrait, 2023

Member of the Georgia House of Representatives from the 80th district
- Incumbent
- Assumed office January 9, 2023
- Preceded by: Mike Wilensky (redistricting)

Personal details
- Party: Democratic

Long Xuan Tran is an American politician from the Georgia Democratic Party who serves as a member of the Georgia House of Representatives representing District 80.

== Career ==
Tran runs a cafe in Peachtree Corners, Georgia. He has been involved in politics since hosting an event for Jon Ossoff in 2017 and has advocated for increased political outreach to Asian American and Pacific Islanders. He also organized Asian American voters in the 2020 Georgia US Senate runoff elections. In April 2021, Tran introduced Joe Biden at a rally in Duluth, Georgia.

In February 2022, he announced his campaign for the Georgia House of Representatives following redistricting, seeking the 80th district in the 2022 election. When Tran took office in January 2023, the legislature was noted as the most diverse in Georgia's history.

Tran voted to legalize sports gambling in March 2026, stating the best way to regulate the industry was to legalize it and casting the issue as a matter of national security since gambling companies are often offshored.

== Personal life ==
Tran resides in Dunwoody, Georgia, and is the son of refugees from South Vietnam. After taking his seat in the Georgia House of Representatives, Tran stated he began growing a beard after being routinely confused by colleagues for fellow Asian American legislators Sam Park and Marvin Lim.

== Electoral history ==
=== 2022 ===
Georgia House of Representatives 80th district general election, 2022
Party	Candidate	Votes	%
Democratic	Long Tran	12,096	57.13%
Republican	Brian Anderson	9,077	42.87%
Total votes		21,173	100%
Democratic hold			

=== 2024 ===
Georgia House of Representatives 80th district Democratic primary election, 2024
Party	Candidate	Votes	%
Democratic	Long Tran (incumbent)	3,736	100%
Total votes		3,736	100%

Georgia House of Representatives 80th district general election, 2024
Party	Candidate	Votes	%
Democratic	Long Tran (incumbent)	15,457	59.6%
Republican	Brian Anderson	10,473	40.4%
Total votes		25,930	100%
Democratic hold			
