= Tommy Benton =

American politician

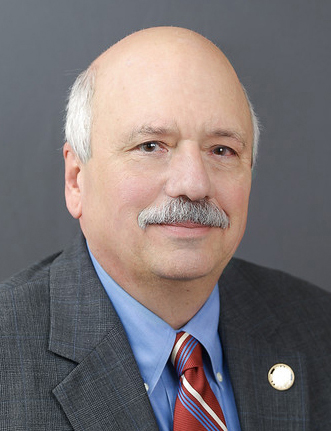

Member of the Georgia House of Representatives from the 31st district
- In office January 10, 2005 – January 9, 2023
- Preceded by: Chris Elrod
- Succeeded by: Emory Dunahoo

Personal details
- Born: Thomas Housch Benton; May 20, 1950 (age 76) Athens, Georgia
- Party: Republican
- Spouse: Karen
- Children: 4
- Occupation: Retired Teacher

Thomas Housch Benton (born May 20, 1950) is an American Republican politician who served in the Georgia House of Representatives from the 31st district from 2005 to 2023. He has been repeatedly criticized for neo-Confederate comments.

== Political career ==
In 2004, Benton ran for election to represent District 31 in the Georgia House of Representatives. He defeated Chris Elrod in the Republican primary with 50.6% of the vote, and was unopposed in the general election. He has been reelected seven times since then, usually without opposition.

== Criticism over racial comments ==
He has been criticized for his neo-Confederate views, which lionize the South's secession and have been criticized as racist. He has claimed that, contrary to historical consensus, slavery was not a cause of the war, the Confederacy's leaders were equal to the Founding Fathers, and that taking down Confederate monuments was "no better than what ISIS is doing." As of 2021, he was one of five Georgia legislators who were members of the neo-Confederate Sons of Confederate Veterans.

In 2016, he gained national attention for apologetic comments about the Ku Klux Klan, which he described as "not so much a racist thing but a vigilante thing to keep law and order...It made a lot of people straighten up. I’m not saying what they did was right. It’s just the way things were." Benton also proposed a bill that would have returned Martin Luther King Boulevard in Atlanta to its former name, Gordon Road, which honored John Brown Gordon, a former slaveholder who historians believe was the Georgia head of the Ku Klux Klan in the 1870s. He also argued that criticism of the Confederate battle flag was an attempt to distract from the issue of "black-on-black crime."

In 2017, Benton received criticism for distributing to members of the state legislature an article headlined "The Absurdity of Slavery as the Cause of the War Between the States." As a result, Republican House leadership stripped him of his chairmanship of the House Human Relations and Aging Committee.

In 2020, after the death of civil rights icon John Lewis, Benton criticized Lewis on a radio show, saying "his only claim to fame was he got conked on the head at the Pettus Bridge...and he has milked that for 50 years." He also said Lewis' accomplishments paled in comparison with those of Alexander H. Stephens, the vice president of the Confederacy most noted for a speech in which he proclaimed "the great truth that the negro is not equal to the white man; that slavery—subordination to the superior race—is his natural and normal condition." After public outcry at the comments, Republican leadership in the Georgia House of Representatives stripped Benton of his chairmanship of the House Retirement Committee.

In December 2021, Benton announced he would not seek re-election.

Georgia House of Representatives
Preceded by Chris Elrod	Member of the Georgia House of Representatives from the 31st district 2005–2023	Succeeded by Emory Dunahoo
