= Derrick McCollum =

American politician

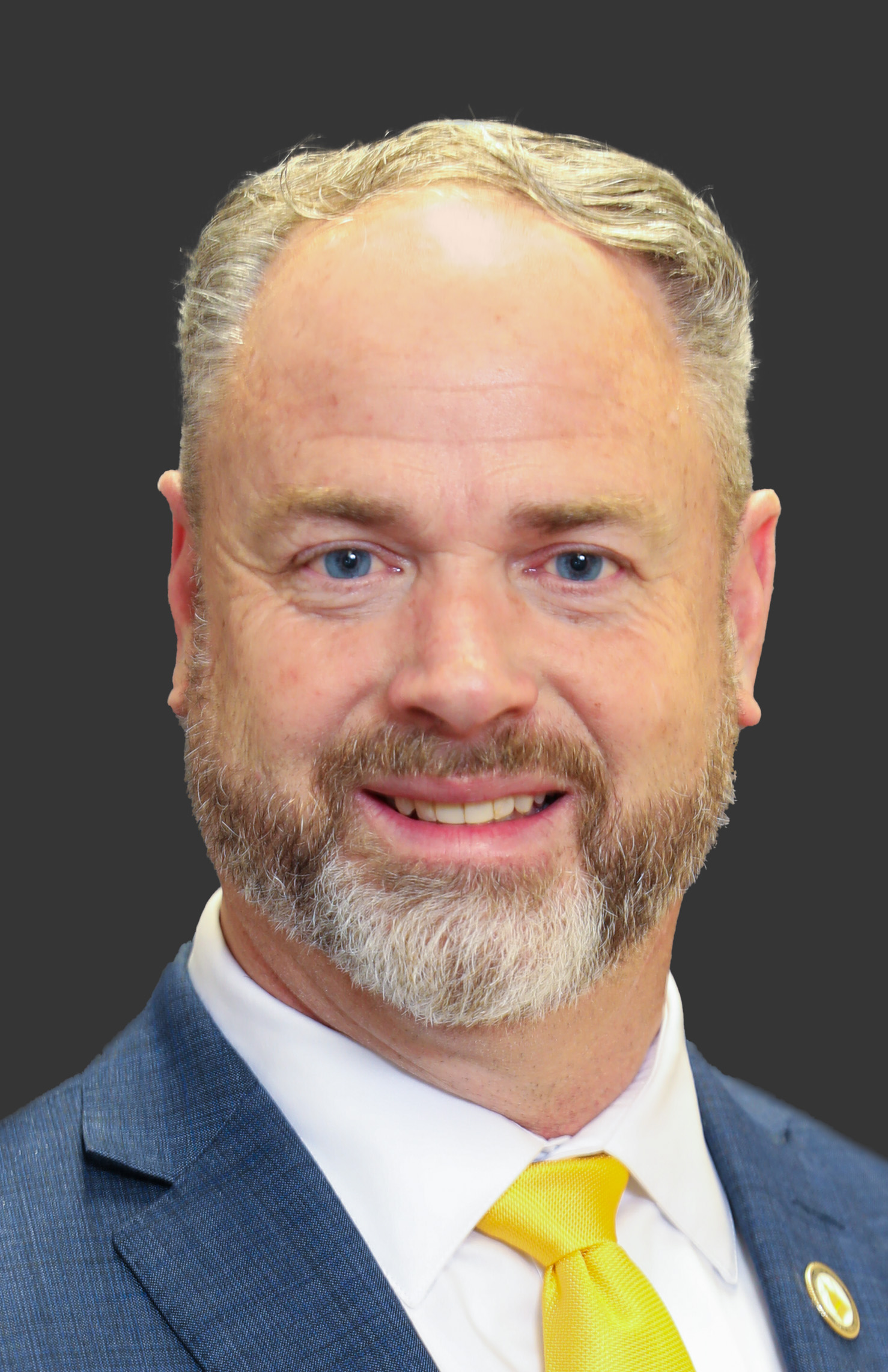

Member of the Georgia House of Representatives from the 30th district
- Incumbent
- Assumed office January 9, 2023
- Preceded by: Chris Erwin (redistricting)

Personal details
- Born: Hall County, Georgia, U.S.
- Party: Republican

Derrick William McCollum is an American politician who has been a member of the Georgia House of Representatives from the 30th district since 2022.

== Career ==
McCollum is a U.S. Marines veteran who served in the Gulf War (Desert Storm) and is a retired firefighter.

== Personal life ==
McCollum attended North Gwinnett High School. He is married and has five children.
