= Georgia's 30th House of Representatives district =

State district in Georgia, USA

Georgia's 30th State House of Representatives district
Representative
Derrick McCollum; R–Chestnut Mountain
- Demographics: 62.8% White; 6.4% Black; 27.4% Hispanic; 1.7% Asian
- Population: 58,299

District 30 elects one member of the Georgia House of Representatives. It contains parts of Gwinnett County and Hall County.

== Members ==
- Sharon Cooper (2003–2005)
- Tom McCall (2005–2011)
- Emory Dunahoo (2011–2023)
- Derrick McCollum (since 2023)
