= Imani Barnes =

American politician

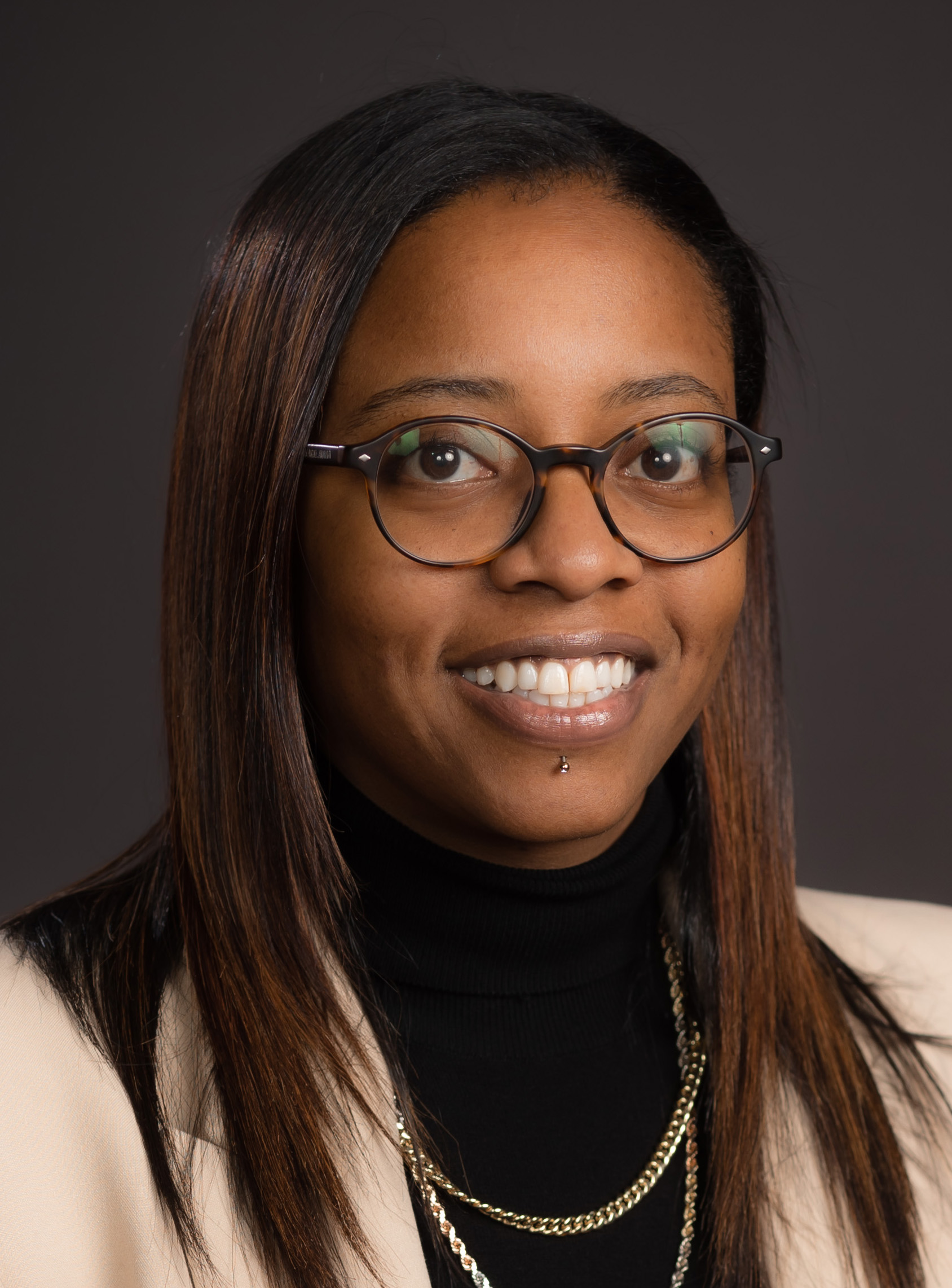

Member of the Georgia House of Representatives from the 86th district
- Incumbent
- Assumed office January 9, 2023
- Preceded by: Zulma Lopez (redistricting)

Personal details
- Party: Democratic
- Education: South Carolina State University

Imani Barnes is an American politician from the Georgia Democratic Party who serves as a member of the Georgia House of Representatives representing District 86.
