= Georgia's 31st House of Representatives district =

State district in Georgia, USA

Georgia's 31st State House of Representatives district
Representative
Emory Dunahoo; R–Gillsville
- Demographics: 84.1% White; 6.4% Black; 5.7% Hispanic; 2.0% Asian
- Population: 54,457

District 31 elects one member of the Georgia House of Representatives. It contains parts of Hall County and Jackson County.

== Members ==
- Sharon Cooper (1997–2003)
- Tommy Benton (2005–2023)
- Emory Dunahoo (2023–2027)
- Chad Bingham (since 2027)
