= Zulma Lopez =

American politician

Member of the Georgia House of Representatives from the 86th district
- In office January 11, 2021 – January 9, 2023
- Preceded by: Michele Henson
- Succeeded by: Imani Barnes

Personal details
- Born: May 2, 1977 (age 49) Puerto Rico
- Party: Democratic
- Spouse: Dax Eric López
- Children: Four
- Education: University of Puerto Rico (BA); University of Puerto Rico School of Law (JD)
- Occupation: Politician

Zulma P. Lopez (born May 2, 1977) is an American politician from the state of Georgia. A Democrat, Lopez represented the 86th District of the Georgia House of Representatives, which encompasses a part of metro Atlanta, from January 2021 to January 2023. On February 4, 2022, Lopez announced she would not be seeking re-election in the Georgia House of Representatives.

== Early life ==
Lopez was born and raised in Puerto Rico. She graduated from the University of Puerto Rico with a B. A. in 1999, and with her J.D. from the University of Puerto Rico School of Law in 2003. Lopez moved to Georgia in 2007. She has owned her own law practice, Lopez Immigration LLC, since 2014.

== Political career ==
In 2019, Lopez announced that she would run for the 86th District of the Georgia House of Representatives against the incumbent representative, Michelle Henson in the primary. Lopez defeated Henson in a runoff election on August 20, 2020. She ran unopposed in the general election.

=== Georgia House of Representatives ===
Lopez served on the Economic Development & Tourism Committee, the Judiciary Non-Civil Committee, and the Science and Technology Committee

== Personal life ==
Lopez is married to DeKalb County State Court Judge Dax Eric López. They have four children.
