= Georgia's 86th House of Representatives district =

State district in Georgia, USA

Georgia's 86th State House of Representatives district
Representative
Imani Barnes; D–Tucker
- Demographics: 27.3% White; 60.0% Black; 3.6% Hispanic; 6.0% Asian
- Population: 55,394

District 86 elects one member of the Georgia House of Representatives. It contains parts of DeKalb County.

== Members ==
- Karla Drenner (2005–2013)
- Michele Henson (2013–2021)
- Zulma Lopez (2021–2023)
- Imani Barnes (since 2023)
