= 2018 Georgia House of Representatives election =

- November 6, 2018

All 180 seats in the Georgia House of Representatives 91 seats needed for a majority
- Turnout: 53.99% ▼10.07 pp
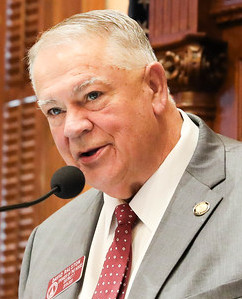

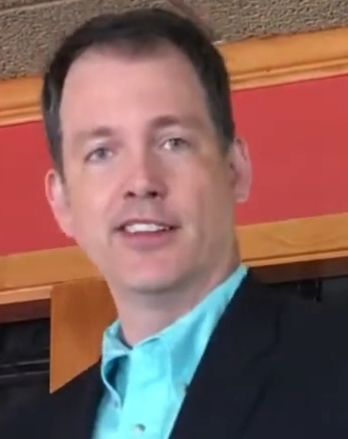
	Majority party	Minority party
Leader	David Ralston	Bob Trammell
Party	Republican	Democratic
Leader since	January 11, 2010	July 24, 2017
Leader's seat	7th	132nd
Last election	118	62
Seats before	116	64
Seats after	105	75
Seat change	▼11	▲11
Popular vote	1,884,211	1,582,161
Percentage	54.28%	45.58%
Swing	▼9.93%	▲10.02%
- Results: Democratic hold Democratic gain Republican hold Republican gain
Speaker before election
David Ralston
Republican
Elected Speaker
David Ralston
Republican

The 2018 Georgia House of Representatives elections took place as part of the biennial United States elections. Georgia voters elected state representatives in all 180 of the state house's districts. State representatives serve two-year terms in the Georgia House of Representatives.

A primary election on May 22, 2018, and a runoff election on July 24, 2018, in races where no candidate received more than 50% of the vote in the May primary, determined which candidates appeared on the November 6 general election ballot. Primary and runoff election results can be obtained from the Georgia Secretary of State's website. A statewide map of Georgia's state House districts can be obtained from the Georgia Legislative and Congressional Reapportionment Office here, and individual district maps can be obtained from the U.S. Census here.

Following the 2016 state House elections, Republicans maintained effective control of the House with 118 members. However, over the course of 2017 and 2018, Democrats flipped District 117 and District 119 in special elections. Due to these special election losses and vacancies caused by resignation, Republican seats decreased from 118 to 115 and Democratic seats increased from 62 to 64 by election day 2018.

To claim control of the chamber from Republicans, the Democrats needed to net 27 House seats. Following the 2018 elections, Democrats received a net gain of 11 seats, winning 14 contests and increasing their margin to 75 seats. Republicans maintained their majority, but they still suffered a net loss of nine seats as opposed to 10 when taking into account that Republican Steven Sainz filled the vacancy in District 180. The Republican majority in the Georgia State House initially stood at 104 after the election, despite winning 105 seats, due to the death of Rep. John Meadows on November 13, 2018. As a result, a special election was held, with Matt Barton winning the election, bringing the Republican seat total back up to 105.

== Predictions ==
Source	Ranking	As of
Governing	Likely R	October 8, 2018

== Results ==
=== Summary ===
Summary of the November 6, 2018 Georgia House of Representatives election results
Party	Candidates	Votes	%	Seats	+/–	%
Republican	128	1,884,211	54.28%	105	-11	58.33%
Democratic	120	1,582,161	45.58%	75	+11	41.66%
Independent	1	4,595	0.14%	0		
Total	248		100.00%	180	–	

Popular vote
Republican	54.28%
Democratic	45.58%
Other	0.14%

House seats
Republican	58.33%
Democratic	41.66%

== Summary of results by district ==
Data for the following table originates from the Georgia Secretary of State's website. The 2016 election results are used to determine "gain" or "hold" for seats without intervening special elections:

District	Democratic		Republican		Others		Total	Result
District	Votes	%	Votes	%	Votes	%	Votes	Result
District 1	-	-	14,272	100.00%	-	-	14,272	Republican hold
District 2	-	-	16,442	100.00%	-	-	16,442	Republican hold
District 3	-	-	16,727	100.00%	-	-	16,727	Republican hold
District 4	-	-	9,878	100.00%	-	-	9,878	Republican hold
District 5	2,919	18.44%	12,914	81.56%	-	-	15,833	Republican hold
District 6	-	-	13,594	100.00%	-	-	13,594	Republican hold
District 7	3,909	15.66%	21,058	84.34%	-	-	24,967	Republican hold
District 8	-	-	23,974	100.00%	-	-	23,974	Republican hold
District 9	-	-	20,490	100.00%	-	-	20,490	Republican hold
District 10	-	-	17,431	100.00%	-	-	17,431	Republican hold
District 11	2,912	14.05%	17,812	85.95%	-	-	20,724	Republican hold
District 12	-	-	14,006	100.00%	-	-	14,006	Republican hold
District 13	5,190	33.44%	10,329	66.56%	-	-	15,519	Republican hold
District 14	-	-	3,174	100.00%	-	-	3,174	Republican hold (Note: The incumbent Republican was appointed to the Georgia Court of Appeals before the general election, so a special election was held in December to determine his successor. As no other parties fielded a candidate, whoever won a majority of the vote in this Republican primary was declared the overall winner.)
District 15	-	-	16,190	100.00%	-	-	16,190	Republican hold
District 16	-	-	15,766	100.00%	-	-	15,766	Republican hold
District 17	6,225	26.80%	17,006	73.20%	-	-	23,231	Republican hold
District 18	4,714	25.79%	13,566	74.21%	-	-	18,280	Republican hold
District 19	8,592	37.38%	14,394	62.62%	-	-	22,986	Republican hold
District 20	7,712	30.09%	17,918	69.91%	-	-	25,630	Republican hold
District 21	6,570	25.30%	19,403	74.70%	-	-	25,973	Republican hold
District 22	7,620	24.11%	23,987	75.89%	-	-	31,607	Republican hold
District 23	5,974	25.15%	17,782	74.85%	-	-	23,756	Republican hold
District 24	-	-	23,646	100.00%	-	-	23,646	Republican hold
District 25	10,074	36.02%	17,897	63.98%	-	-	27,971	Republican hold
District 26	-	-	24,544	100.00%	-	-	24,544	Republican hold
District 27	-	-	18,400	100.00%	-	-	18,400	Republican hold
District 28	-	-	6,107	100.00%	-	-	6,107	Republican hold (Note: This is the result of the second do-over election for this district. The original election, the May 2018 Republican primary, was determined invalid by a judge because some voters were sent the wrong district's ballot. The first do-over election, held in December 2018, was voided by another judge for the same reason.)
District 29	-	-	9,728	67.92%	4,595	32.08%	14,323	Republican hold
District 30	5,358	27.18%	14,358	72.82%	-	-	19,716	Republican hold
District 31	-	-	21,281	100.00%	-	-	21,281	Republican hold
District 32	-	-	18,065	100.00%	-	-	18,065	Republican hold
District 33	-	-	18,282	100.00%	-	-	18,282	Republican hold
District 34	9,968	42.33%	13,581	57.67%	-	-	23,549	Republican hold
District 35	10,775	47.70%	11,816	52.30%	-	-	22,591	Republican hold
District 36	10,329	34.18%	19,891	65.82%	-	-	30,220	Republican hold
District 37	11,928	50.37%	11,755	49.63%	-	-	23,683	Democratic gain
District 38	19,321	100.00%	-	-	-	-	19,321	Democratic hold
District 39	16,607	83.23%	3,345	16.77%	-	-	19,952	Democratic hold
District 40	15,719	54.68%	13,029	45.32%	-	-	28,748	Democratic gain
District 41	11,673	70.61%	4,858	29.39%	-	-	16,531	Democratic hold
District 42	12,830	100.00%	-	-	-	-	12,830	Democratic hold
District 43	12,330	48.44%	13,122	51.56%	-	-	25,452	Republican hold
District 44	11,422	44.63%	14,170	55.37%	-	-	25,592	Republican hold
District 45	11,681	40.72%	17,003	59.28%	-	-	28,684	Republican hold
District 46	10,789	38.18%	17,466	61.82%	-	-	28,255	Republican hold
District 47	10,403	38.36%	16,718	61.64%	-	-	27,121	Republican hold
District 48	11,102	50.34%	10,952	49.66%	-	-	22,054	Democratic gain
District 49	11,268	45.80%	13,334	54.20%	-	-	24,602	Republican hold
District 50	11,015	50.73%	10,698	49.27%	-	-	21,713	Democratic gain
District 51	12,531	51.57%	11,767	48.43%	-	-	24,298	Democratic gain
District 52	12,796	47.72%	14,018	52.28%	-	-	26,814	Republican hold
District 53	20,032	100.00%	-	-	-	-	20,032	Democratic hold
District 54	15,186	51.71%	14,179	48.29%	-	-	29,365	Democratic gain
District 55	23,310	100.00%	-	-	-	-	23,310	Democratic hold
District 56	16,311	100.00%	-	-	-	-	16,311	Democratic hold
District 57	24,886	100.00%	-	-	-	-	24,886	Democratic hold
District 58	23,663	100.00%	-	-	-	-	23,663	Democratic hold
District 59	20,727	100.00%	-	-	-	-	20,727	Democratic hold
District 60	16,108	100.00%	-	-	-	-	16,108	Democratic hold
District 61	20,043	100.00%	-	-	-	-	20,043	Democratic hold
District 62	23,959	100.00%	-	-	-	-	23,959	Democratic hold
District 63	20,872	100.00%	-	-	-	-	20,872	Democratic hold
District 64	21,157	100.00%	-	-	-	-	21,157	Democratic hold
District 65	21,189	100.00%	-	-	-	-	21,189	Democratic hold
District 66	17,434	100.00%	-	-	-	-	17,434	Democratic hold
District 67	-	-	17,029	100.00%	-	-	17,029	Republican hold
District 68	-	-	18,146	100.00%	-	-	18,146	Republican hold
District 69	-	-	18,063	100.00%	-	-	18,063	Republican hold
District 70	-	-	18,473	100.00%	-	-	18,473	Republican hold
District 71	6,765	25.57%	19,690	74.43%	-	-	26,455	Republican hold
District 72	-	-	24,429	100.00%	-	-	24,429	Republican hold
District 73	-	-	17,210	100.00%	-	-	17,210	Republican hold
District 74	14,533	100.00%	-	-	-	-	14,533	Democratic hold
District 75	17,817	100.00%	-	-	-	-	17,817	Democratic hold
District 76	20,350	100.00%	-	-	-	-	20,350	Democratic hold
District 77	15,480	100.00%	-	-	-	-	15,480	Democratic hold
District 78	19,347	100.00%	-	-	-	-	19,347	Democratic hold
District 79	12,441	53.83%	10,670	46.17%	-	-	23,111	Democratic gain
District 80	12,578	52.48%	11,389	47.52%	-	-	23,967	Democratic gain
District 81	11,304	64.09%	6,334	35.91%	-	-	17,638	Democratic hold
District 82	18,015	100.00%	-	-	-	-	18,015	Democratic hold
District 83	25,187	100.00%	-	-	-	-	25,187	Democratic hold
District 84	26,038	100.00%	-	-	-	-	26,038	Democratic hold
District 85	18,544	100.00%	-	-	-	-	18,544	Democratic hold
District 86	19,236	100.00%	-	-	-	-	19,236	Democratic hold
District 87	21,468	100.00%	-	-	-	-	21,468	Democratic hold
District 88	18,774	100.00%	-	-	-	-	18,774	Democratic hold
District 89	27,810	100.00%	-	-	-	-	27,810	Democratic hold
District 90	21,038	79.92%	5,286	20.08%	-	-	26,324	Democratic hold
District 91	21,329	100.00%	-	-	-	-	21,329	Democratic hold
District 92	16,246	100.00%	-	-	-	-	16,246	Democratic hold
District 93	23,221	100.00%	-	-	-	-	23,221	Democratic hold
District 94	20,984	100.00%	-	-	-	-	20,984	Democratic hold
District 95	12,101	51.40%	11,442	48.60%	-	-	23,543	Democratic gain
District 96	10,810	100.00%	-	-	-	-	10,810	Democratic hold
District 97	10,696	44.14%	13,538	55.86%	-	-	24,234	Republican hold
District 98	-	-	17,529	100.00%	-	-	17,529	Republican hold
District 99	7,362	100.00%	-	-	-	-	7,362	Democratic hold
District 100	10,668	100.00%	-	-	-	-	10,668	Democratic hold
District 101	11,459	58.81%	8,027	41.19%	-	-	19,486	Democratic hold
District 102	10,617	51.41%	10,033	48.59%	-	-	20,650	Democratic gain
District 103	-	-	21,512	100.00%	-	-	21,512	Republican hold
District 104	11,790	46.63%	13,493	53.37%	-	-	25,283	Republican hold
District 105	14,335	58.37%	10,224	41.63%	-	-	24,559	Democratic gain
District 106	-	-	14,973	100.00%	-	-	14,973	Republican hold
District 107	12,425	58.79%	8,709	41.21%	-	-	21,134	Democratic gain
District 108	10,877	50.68%	10,585	49.32%	-	-	21,462	Democratic gain
District 109	13,027	48.46%	13,855	51.54%	-	-	26,882	Republican hold
District 110	-	-	16,046	100.00%	-	-	16,046	Republican hold
District 111	16,143	56.59%	12,385	43.41%	-	-	28,528	Democratic gain
District 112	-	-	20,912	100.00%	-	-	20,912	Republican hold
District 113	18,610	100.00%	-	-	-	-	18,610	Democratic hold
District 114	-	-	20,281	100.00%	-	-	20,281	Republican hold
District 115	-	-	19,935	100.00%	-	-	19,935	Republican hold
District 116	-	-	17,569	100.00%	-	-	17,569	Republican hold
District 117	11,418	46.45%	13,164	53.55%	-	-	24,582	Republican hold
District 118	15,558	100.00%	-	-	-	-	15,558	Democratic hold
District 119	11,929	47.22%	13,336	52.78%	-	-	25,265	Republican hold
District 120	7,909	31.61%	17,110	68.39%	-	-	25,019	Republican hold
District 121	-	-	19,114	100.00%	-	-	19,114	Republican hold
District 122	-	-	24,189	100.00%	-	-	24,189	Republican hold
District 123	7,953	33.14%	16,044	66.86%	-	-	23,997	Republican hold
District 124	13,099	100.00%	-	-	-	-	13,099	Democratic hold
District 125	13,564	100.00%	-	-	-	-	13,564	Democratic hold
District 126	14,840	69.53%	6,503	30.47%	-	-	21,343	Democratic hold
District 127	14,554	100.00%	-	-	-	-	14,554	Democratic hold
District 128	11,113	57.01%	8,379	42.99%	-	-	19,492	Democratic hold
District 129	-	-	17,652	100.00%	-	-	17,652	Republican hold
District 130	-	-	15,764	100.00%	-	-	15,764	Republican hold
District 131	5,810	26.25%	16,323	73.75%	-	-	22,133	Republican hold
District 132	8,903	52.20%	8,154	47.80%	-	-	17,057	Democratic hold
District 133	-	-	20,118	100.00%	-	-	20,118	Republican hold
District 134	-	-	17,336	100.00%	-	-	17,336	Republican hold
District 135	9,538	100.00%	-	-	-	-	9,538	Democratic hold
District 136	15,271	100.00%	-	-	-	-	15,271	Democratic hold
District 137	17,183	100.00%	-	-	-	-	17,183	Democratic hold
District 138	7,131	48.21%	7,662	51.79%	-	-	14,793	Republican gain
District 139	11,713	100.00%	-	-	-	-	11,713	Democratic hold
District 140	-	-	15,676	100.00%	-	-	15,676	Republican hold
District 141	-	-	21,109	100.00%	-	-	21,109	Republican hold
District 142	15,148	100.00%	-	-	-	-	15,148	Democratic hold
District 143	14,873	100.00%	-	-	-	-	14,873	Democratic hold
District 144	7,850	34.62%	14,825	65.38%	-	-	22,675	Republican hold
District 145	-	-	12,821	100.00%	-	-	12,821	Republican hold
District 146	-	-	20,375	100.00%	-	-	20,375	Republican hold
District 147	8,288	45.85%	9,787	54.15%	-	-	18,075	Republican hold
District 148	5,567	30.55%	12,657	69.45%	-	-	18,224	Republican hold
District 149	-	-	11,904	100.00%	-	-	11,904	RepublicanhHold
District 150	-	-	16,319	100.00%	-	-	16,319	Republican hold
District 151	9,257	46.47%	10,664	53.53%	-	-	19,921	Republican hold
District 152	5,813	25.96%	16,580	74.04%	-	-	22,393	Republican hold
District 153	10,512	65.47%	5,543	34.53%	-	-	16,055	Democratic hold
District 154	14,850	100.00%	-	-	-	-	14,850	Democratic hold
District 155	-	-	15,946	100.00%	-	-	15,946	Republican hold
District 156	-	-	15,430	100.00%	-	-	15,430	Republican hold
District 157	-	-	12,871	100.00%	-	-	12,871	Republican hold
District 158	-	-	14,685	100.00%	-	-	14,685	Republican hold
District 159	-	-	16,917	100.00%	-	-	16,917	Republican hold
District 160	-	-	14,372	100.00%	-	-	14,372	Republican hold
District 161	8,973	36.55%	15,574	63.45%	-	-	24,547	Republican hold
District 162	13,372	100.00%	-	-	-	-	13,372	Democratic hold
District 163	14,959	100.00%	-	-	-	-	14,959	Democratic hold
District 164	8,420	47.54%	9,291	52.46%	-	-	17,711	Republican hold
District 165	16,361	100.00%	-	-	-	-	16,361	Democratic hold
District 166	-	-	24,256	100.00%	-	-	24,256	Republican hold
District 167	6,431	32.12%	13,591	67.88%	-	-	20,022	Republican hold
District 168	11,947	100.00%	-	-	-	-	11,947	Democratic hold
District 169	-	-	12,937	100.00%	-	-	12,937	Republican hold
District 170	-	-	14,668	100.00%	-	-	14,668	Republican hold
District 171	-	-	13,765	100.00%	-	-	13,765	Republican hold
District 172	-	-	12,046	100.00%	-	-	12,046	Republican hold
District 173	7,409	38.98%	11,599	61.02%	-	-	19,008	Republican hold
District 174	-	-	13,773	100.00%	-	-	13,773	Republican hold
District 175	6,230	28.49%	15,638	71.51%	-	-	21,868	Republican hold
District 176	-	-	13,817	100.00%	-	-	13,817	Republican hold
District 177	10,889	100.00%	-	-	-	-	10,889	Democratic hold
District 178	1,945	10.57%	16,451	89.43%	-	-	18,396	Republican hold
District 179	9,023	42.24%	12,337	57.76%	-	-	21,360	Republican hold
District 180	-	-	14,530	100.00%	-	-	14,530	Republican hold

State House district	Incumbent	Party	Elected representative	Party
1st	John Deffenbaugh	Rep	Colton Moore	Rep
2nd	Steve Tarvin	Rep	Steve Tarvin	Rep
3rd	Dewayne Hill	Rep	Dewayne Hill	Rep
4th	Kasey Carpenter	Rep	Kasey Carpenter	Rep
5th	John Meadows	Rep	John Meadows	Rep
6th	Jason Ridley	Rep	Jason Ridley	Rep
7th	David Ralston	Rep	David Ralston	Rep
8th	Matt Gurtler	Rep	Matt Gurtler	Rep
9th	Kevin Tanner	Rep	Kevin Tanner	Rep
10th	Terry Rogers	Rep	Terry Rogers	Rep
11th	Rick Jasperse	Rep	Rick Jasperse	Rep
12th	Eddie Lumsden	Rep	Eddie Lumsden	Rep
13th	Katie M. Dempsey	Rep	Katie M. Dempsey	Rep
14th	Christian Coomer	Rep	Mitchell Scoggins	Rep
15th	Paul Battles	Rep	Matthew Gambill	Rep
16th	Trey Kelley	Rep	Trey Kelley	Rep
17th	Howard Maxwell	Rep	Martin Momtahan	Rep
18th	Kevin Cooke	Rep	Kevin Cooke	Rep
19th	Paulette Rakestraw	Rep	Joseph Gullett	Rep
20th	Michael Caldwell	Rep	Michael Caldwell	Rep
21st	Scot Turner	Rep	Scot Turner	Rep
22nd	Wes Cantrell	Rep	Wes Cantrell	Rep
23rd	Mandi L. Ballinger	Rep	Mandi L. Ballinger	Rep
24th	Sheri Gilligan	Rep	Sheri Gilligan	Rep
25th	Todd Jones	Rep	Todd Jones	Rep
26th	Marc Morris	Rep	Marc Morris	Rep
27th	Lee Hawkins	Rep	Lee Hawkins	Rep
28th	Dan Gasaway	Rep	Chris Erwin	Rep
29th	Matt Dubnik	Rep	Matt Dubnik	Rep
30th	Emory Dunahoo	Rep	Emory Dunahoo	Rep
31st	Tommy Benton	Rep	Tommy Benton	Rep
32nd	Alan Powell	Rep	Alan Powell	Rep
33rd	Tom McCall	Rep	Tom McCall	Rep
34th	Bert Reeves	Rep	Bert Reeves	Rep
35th	Ed Setzler	Rep	Ed Setzler	Rep
36th	Earl Ehrhart	Rep	Ginny Ehrhart	Rep
37th	Sam Teasley	Rep	Mary Frances Williams	Dem
38th	David Wilkerson	Dem	David Wilkerson	Dem
39th	Erica Thomas	Dem	Erica Thomas	Dem
40th	Rich Golick	Rep	Erick Allen	Dem
41st	Michael Smith	Dem	Michael Smith	Dem
42nd	Teri Anulewicz	Dem	Teri Anulewicz	Dem
43rd	Sharon Cooper	Rep	Sharon Cooper	Rep
44th	Don Parsons	Rep	Don Parsons	Rep
45th	Matt Dollar	Rep	Matt Dollar	Rep
46th	John Carson	Rep	John Carson	Rep
47th	Jan Jones	Rep	Jan Jones	Rep
48th	Betty Price	Rep	Mary Robichaux	Dem
49th	Chuck Martin	Rep	Chuck Martin	Rep
50th	Brad Raffensperger	Rep	Angelika Kausche	Dem
51st	Wendell Willard	Rep	Josh McLaurin	Dem
52nd	Deborah Silcox	Rep	Deborah Silcox	Rep
53rd	Sheila Jones	Dem	Sheila Jones	Dem
54th	Beth Beskin	Rep	Betsy Holland	Dem
55th	Marie Metze	Dem	Marie Metze	Dem
56th	Mable Thomas	Dem	Mable Thomas	Dem
57th	Pat Gardner	Dem	Pat Gardner	Dem
58th	Park Cannon	Dem	Park Cannon	Dem
59th	David Dreyer	Dem	David Dreyer	Dem
60th	Kim Schofield	Dem	Kim Schofield	Dem
61st	Roger Bruce	Dem	Roger Bruce	Dem
62nd	William Boddie	Dem	William Boddie	Dem
63rd	Debra Bazemore	Dem	Debra Bazemore	Dem
64th	Derrick Jackson	Dem	Derrick Jackson	Dem
65th	Sharon Beasley-Teague	Dem	Sharon Beasley-Teague	Dem
66th	Kimberly Alexander	Dem	Kimberly Alexander	Dem
67th	Micah Gravley	Rep	Micah Gravley	Rep
68th	J. Collins	Rep	J. Collins	Rep
69th	Randy Nix	Rep	Randy Nix	Rep
70th	Lynn Smith	Rep	Lynn Smith	Rep
71st	David Stover	Rep	David Stover	Rep
72nd	Josh Bonner	Rep	Josh Bonner	Rep
73rd	Karen Mathiak	Rep	Karen Mathiak	Rep
74th	Valencia Stovall	Dem	Valencia Stovall	Dem
75th	Mike Glanton	Dem	Mike Glanton	Dem
76th	Sandra Scott	Dem	Sandra Scott	Dem
77th	Rhonda Burnough	Dem	Rhonda Burnough	Dem
78th	Demetrius Douglas	Dem	Demetrius Douglas	Dem
79th	Tom Taylor	Rep	Michael Wilensky	Dem
80th	Meagan Hanson	Rep	Matthew Wilson	Dem
81st	Scott Holcomb	Dem	Scott Holcomb	Dem
82nd	Mary Margaret Oliver	Dem	Mary Margaret Oliver	Dem
83rd	Howard Mosby	Dem	Becky Evans	Dem
84th	Renitta Shannon	Dem	Renitta Shannon	Dem
85th	Karla Drenner	Dem	Karla Drenner	Dem
86th	Michele Henson	Dem	Michele Henson	Dem
87th	Earnest "Coach" Williams	Dem	Viola Davis	Dem
88th	Billy Mitchell	Dem	Billy Mitchell	Dem
89th	Bee Nguyen	Dem	Bee Nguyen	Dem
90th	Pam Stephenson	Dem	Pam Stephenson	Dem
91st	Vernon Jones	Dem	Vernon Jones	Dem
92nd	Doreen Carter	Dem	Doreen Carter	Dem
93rd	Dar'shun Kendrick	Dem	Dar'shun Kendrick	Dem
94th	Karen Bennett	Dem	Karen Bennett	Dem
95th	Scott Hilton	Rep	Beth Moore	Dem
96th	Pedro "Pete" Marin	Dem	Pedro "Pete" Marin	Dem
97th	Brooks Coleman	Rep	Bonnie Rich	Rep
98th	David Clark	Rep	David Clark	Rep
99th	Brenda Lopez	Dem	Brenda Lopez	Dem
100th	Dewey McClain	Dem	Dewey McClain	Dem
101st	Sam Park	Dem	Sam Park	Dem
102nd	Buzz Brockway	Rep	Gregg Kennard	Dem
103rd	Timothy Barr	Rep	Timothy Barr	Rep
104th	Chuck Efstration	Rep	Chuck Efstration	Rep
105th	Joyce Chandler	Rep	Donna McLeod	Dem
106th	Brett Harrell	Rep	Brett Harrell	Rep
107th	David Casas	Rep	Shelly Hutchinson	Dem
108th	Clay Cox	Rep	Jasmine Clark	Dem
109th	Dale Rutledge	Rep	Dale Rutledge	Rep
110th	Andrew Welch	Rep	Andrew Welch	Rep
111th	Geoff Cauble	Rep	El-Mahdi Holly	Dem
112th	Dave Belton	Rep	Dave Belton	Rep
113th	Pam Dickerson	Dem	Pam Dickerson	Dem
114th	Tom Kirby	Rep	Tom Kirby	Rep
115th	Bruce Williamson	Rep	Bruce Williamson	Rep
116th	Terry England	Rep	Terry England	Rep
117th	Deborah Gonzalez	Dem	Houston Gaines	Rep
118th	Spencer Frye	Dem	Spencer Frye	Dem
119th	Jonathan Wallace	Dem	Marcus Wiedower	Rep
120th	Trey Rhodes	Rep	Trey Rhodes	Rep
121st	Barry Fleming	Rep	Barry Fleming	Rep
122nd	Jodi Lott	Rep	Jodi Lott	Rep
123rd	Mark Newton	Rep	Mark Newton	Rep
124th	Henry "Wayne" Howard	Dem	Henry "Wayne" Howard	Dem
125th	Sheila Clark Nelson	Dem	Sheila Clark Nelson	Dem
126th	Gloria Frazier	Dem	Gloria Frazier	Dem
127th	Brian Prince	Dem	Brian Prince	Dem
128th	Mack Jackson	Dem	Mack Jackson	Dem
129th	Susan Holmes	Rep	Susan Holmes	Rep
130th	David Knight	Rep	David Knight	Rep
131st	Johnnie Caldwell Jr.	Rep	Ken Pullin	Rep
132nd	Bob Trammell	Dem	Bob Trammell	Dem
133rd	John Pezold	Rep	Vance Smith	Rep
134th	Richard H. Smith	Rep	Richard H. Smith	Rep
135th	Calvin Smyre	Dem	Calvin Smyre	Dem
136th	Carolyn Hugley	Dem	Carolyn Hugley	Dem
137th	Debbie Buckner	Dem	Debbie Buckner	Dem
138th	Bill McGowan	Dem	Mike Cheokas	Rep
139th	Patty Bentley	Dem	Patty Bentley	Dem
140th	Robert Dickey	Rep	Robert Dickey	Rep
141st	Allen Peake	Rep	Dale Washburn	Rep
142nd	Miriam Paris	Dem	Miriam Paris	Dem
143rd	James Beverly	Dem	James Beverly	Dem
144th	Bubber Epps	Rep	Danny Mathis	Rep
145th	Rick Williams	Rep	Rick Williams	Rep
146th	Shaw Blackmon	Rep	Shaw Blackmon	Rep
147th	Heath Clark	Rep	Heath Clark	Rep
148th	Buddy Harden	Rep	Noel Williams	Rep
149th	Jimmy Pruett	Rep	Jimmy Pruett	Rep
150th	Matt Hatchett	Rep	Matt Hatchett	Rep
151st	Gerald Greene	Rep	Gerald Greene	Rep
152nd	Ed Rynders	Rep	Ed Rynders	Rep
153rd	Darrel Bush Ealum	Dem	CaMia Whitaker Hopson	Dem
154th	Winfred Dukes	Dem	Winfred Dukes	Dem
155th	Clay Pirkle	Rep	Clay Pirkle	Rep
156th	Greg Morris	Rep	Greg Morris	Rep
157th	Bill Werkheiser	Rep	Bill Werkheiser	Rep
158th	Butch Parrish	Rep	Butch Parrish	Rep
159th	Jon G. Burns	Rep	Jon G. Burns	Rep
160th	Jan Tankersley	Rep	Jan Tankersley	Rep
161st	Bill Hitchens	Rep	Bill Hitchens	Rep
162nd	Carl Wayne Gilliard	Dem	Carl Wayne Gilliard	Dem
163rd	J. Craig Gordon	Dem	J. Craig Gordon	Dem
164th	Ron Stephens	Rep	Ron Stephens	Rep
165th	Mickey Stephens	Dem	Mickey Stephens	Dem
166th	Jesse Petrea	Rep	Jesse Petrea	Rep
167th	Jeff Jones	Rep	Jeff Jones	Rep
168th	Al Williams	Dem	Al Williams	Dem
169th	Dominic LaRiccia	Rep	Dominic LaRiccia	Rep
170th	Penny Houston	Rep	Penny Houston	Rep
171st	Jay Powell	Rep	Jay Powell	Rep
172nd	Sam Watson	Rep	Sam Watson	Rep
173rd	Darlene Taylor	Rep	Darlene Taylor	Rep
174th	John Corbett	Rep	John Corbett	Rep
175th	John LaHood	Rep	John LaHood	Rep
176th	Jason Shaw	Rep	Jason Shaw	Rep
177th	Dexter Sharper	Dem	Dexter Sharper	Dem
178th	Chad Nimmer	Rep	Steven Meeks	Rep
179th	Don Hogan	Rep	Don Hogan	Rep
180th	Vacant	Rep	Steven Sainz	Rep

== Detailed Results by District ==
=== District 1 ===
Republican primary
Party	Candidate	Votes	%
Republican	Colton Moore	2,184	54.01
Republican	John Deffenbaugh (incumbent)	1,860	45.99
Total votes		4,044	100.0

1st District general election
Party	Candidate	Votes	%
Republican	Colton Moore	14,272	100.0
Total votes		14,272	100.0
Republican hold			

=== District 2 ===
Republican primary
Party	Candidate	Votes	%
Republican	Steve Tarvin (incumbent)	2,726	100.0
Total votes		2,726	100.0

2nd District general election
Party	Candidate	Votes	%
Republican	Steve Tarvin (incumbent)	16,442	100.0
Total votes		16,442	100.0
Republican hold			

=== District 3 ===
Republican primary
Party	Candidate	Votes	%
Republican	Dewayne Hill (incumbent)	2,529	100.0
Total votes		2,529	100.0

3rd District general election
Party	Candidate	Votes	%
Republican	Dewayne Hill (incumbent)	16,727	100.0
Total votes		16,727	100.0
Republican hold			

=== District 4 ===
Republican primary
Party	Candidate	Votes	%
Republican	Kasey Carpenter (incumbent)	1,683	100.0
Total votes		1,683	100.0

4th District general election
Party	Candidate	Votes	%
Republican	Kasey Carpenter (incumbent)	9,878	100.0
Total votes		9,878	100.0
Republican hold			

=== District 5 ===
Republican primary
Party	Candidate	Votes	%
Republican	John Meadows (incumbent)	2,597	100.0
Total votes		2,597	100.0

Democratic primary
Party	Candidate	Votes	%
Democratic	Brian Rosser	505	100.0
Total votes		505	100.0

5th District general election
Party	Candidate	Votes	%
Republican	John Meadows (incumbent)	12,914	81.56
Democratic	Brian Rosser	2,919	18.44
Total votes		15,833	100.0

=== District 6 ===
Republican primary
Party	Candidate	Votes	%
Republican	Jason T. Ridley (incumbent)	2,091	100.0
Total votes		2,091	100.0

6th District general election
Party	Candidate	Votes	%
Republican	Jason T. Ridley (incumbent)	13,594	100.0
Total votes		13,594	100.0
Republican hold			

=== District 7 ===
Republican primary
Party	Candidate	Votes	%
Republican	David Ralston (incumbent)	5,755	74.1
Republican	Margaret Williamson	2,012	25.9
Total votes		7,767	100.0

Democratic primary
Party	Candidate	Votes	%
Democratic	Rick D. Day	937	100.0
Total votes		937	100.0

7th District general election
Party	Candidate	Votes	%
Republican	David Ralston (incumbent)	21,058	84.34
Democratic	Rick D. Day	3,909	15.66
Total votes			100.0

=== District 8 ===
Republican primary
Party	Candidate	Votes	%
Republican	Matt Gurtler (incumbent)	5,971	60.19
Republican	Mickey Cummings	3,950	39.81
Total votes		9,921	100.0

8th District general election
Party	Candidate	Votes	%
Republican	Matt Gurtler (incumbent)	23,974	100.0
Total votes		23,974	100.0
Republican hold			

=== District 9 ===
Republican primary
Party	Candidate	Votes	%
Republican	Kevin Tanner (incumbent)	4,105	73.91
Republican	Mark Hajduk	1,449	26.09
Total votes		5,554	100.0

9th District general election
Party	Candidate	Votes	%
Republican	Kevin Tanner (incumbent)	20,490	100.0
Total votes		20.490	100.0
Republican hold			

=== District 10 ===
Republican primary
Party	Candidate	Votes	%
Republican	Terry Rogers (incumbent)	4,946	100.0
Total votes		4,946	100.0

10th District general election
Party	Candidate	Votes	%
Republican	Terry Rogers (incumbent)	17,431	100.0
Total votes		17,431	100.0
Republican hold			

=== District 11 ===
Republican primary
Party	Candidate	Votes	%
Republican	Rick Jasperse (incumbent)	4,865	100.0
Total votes		4,865	100.0

Democratic primary
Party	Candidate	Votes	%
Democratic	Lee A. Shiver	674	100
Total votes		674	100.0

11th District general election
Party	Candidate	Votes	%
Republican	Rick Jasperse (incumbent)	17,812	85.95
Democratic	Lee A. Shiver	2,912	14.05
Total votes			100.0

=== District 12 ===
Republican primary
Party	Candidate	Votes	%
Republican	Eddie Lumsden (incumbent)	3,070	100.0
Total votes		3,070	100.0

12th District general election
Party	Candidate	Votes	%
Republican	Eddie Lumsden (incumbent)	14,006	100.0
Total votes		14,006	100.0
Republican hold			

=== District 13 ===
Democratic primary
Party	Candidate	Votes	%
Democratic	John Burnette II	1,242	100.0
Total votes		1,242	100.0

Republican primary
Party	Candidate	Votes	%
Republican	Katie Dempsey (incumbent)	3,046	100.0
Total votes		3,046	100.0

13th District general election
Party	Candidate	Votes	%
Democratic	John Burnette II	5,190	33.44
Republican	Katie Dempsey (incumbent)	10,329	66.56
Total votes		15,519	100.0

=== District 14 ===
Republican primary
Party	Candidate	Votes	%
Republican	Christian Coomer (incumbent)	3,195	100.0
Total votes		3,195	100.0

14th District general election
Party	Candidate	Votes	%
Republican	Christian Coomer (incumbent)		
Total votes			100.0
Republican hold			

=== District 15 ===
Republican primary
Party	Candidate	Votes	%
Republican	Matthew Gambill	3,047	87.43
Republican	Allan Levene	438	12.57
Total votes		3,485	100.0

15th District general election
Party	Candidate	Votes	%
Republican	Matthew Gambill	16,190	100.0
Total votes		16,190	100.0
Republican hold			

=== District 16 ===
Republican primary
Party	Candidate	Votes	%
Republican	Trey Kelley (incumbent)	3,174	100.0
Total votes		3,174	100.0

16th District general election
Party	Candidate	Votes	%
Independent	Amanda Carter James		
Republican	Trey Kelley (incumbent)	15,766	100.0
Total votes		15,766	100.0

=== District 17 ===
Democratic primary
Party	Candidate	Votes	%
Democratic	Ralph Meers	923	100.0
Total votes		923	100.0

Republican primary
Party	Candidate	Votes	%
Republican	Martin Momtahan	2,594	51.88
Republican	David Barnett	2,406	48.12
Total votes		5,000	100.0

17th District general election
Party	Candidate	Votes	%
Democratic	Ralph Meers	6,225	26.80
Republican	Martin Momtahan	17,006	73.20
Total votes			100.0

=== District 18 ===
Republican primary
Party	Candidate	Votes	%
Republican	Kevin Cooke (incumbent)	3,514	100.0
Total votes		3,514	100.0

Democratic primary
Party	Candidate	Votes	%
Democratic	Pat Rhudy	968	100.0
Total votes		968	100.0

18th District general election
Party	Candidate	Votes	%
Republican	Kevin Cooke (incumbent)	13,566	74.21
Democratic	Pat Rhudy	4,714	25.79
Total votes		18,280	100.0

=== District 19 ===
Democratic primary
Party	Candidate	Votes	%
Democratic	Alison Feliciano	962	65.67
Democratic	Nigel Sims	503	34.33
Total votes		1,465	100.0

Republican primary
Party	Candidate	Votes	%
Republican	Paulette Rakestraw (incumbent)	1,600	43.99
Republican	Joseph Gullett	1,152	31.67
Republican	Bryan Dobbs	885	24.33
Total votes		3,637	100.0

Republican primary runoff
Party	Candidate	Votes	%
Republican	Joseph Gullett	2,321	56.96
Republican	Paulette Rakestraw (incumbent)	1,754	43.04
Total votes		4,075	100.0

19th District general election
Party	Candidate	Votes	%
Democratic	Alison Feliciano	8,592	37.38
Republican	Joseph Gullett	14,394	62.62
Total votes		22,986	100.0

=== District 20 ===
Democratic primary
Party	Candidate	Votes	%
Democratic	Lillian Burnaman	1,255	100.0
Total votes		1,255	100.0

Republican primary
Party	Candidate	Votes	%
Republican	Michael Caldwell (incumbent)	3,603	100.0
Total votes		3,603	100.0

20th District general election
Party	Candidate	Votes	%
Democratic	Lillian Burnaman	7,712	30.09
Republican	Michael Caldwell (incumbent)	17,918	69.91
Total votes		25,630	100.0

=== District 21 ===
Republican primary
Party	Candidate	Votes	%
Republican	Scot Turner (incumbent)	3,924	100.0
Total votes		3,924	100.0

Democratic primary
Party	Candidate	Votes	%
Democratic	Melanie Whitfield	982	100.0
Total votes		982	100.0

21st District general election
Party	Candidate	Votes	%
Republican	Scot Turner (incumbent)	19,403	74.70
Democratic	Melanie Whitfield	6,570	25.30
Total votes		25,973	100.0

=== District 22 ===
Republican primary
Party	Candidate	Votes	%
Republican	Wes Cantrell (incumbent)	5,809	100.0
Total votes		5,809	100.0

Democratic primary
Party	Candidate	Votes	%
Democratic	Charles Ravenscraft	1,291	100.0
Total votes		1,291	100.0

22nd District general election
Party	Candidate	Votes	%
Republican	Wes Cantrell (incumbent)	23,987	75.89
Democratic	Charles Ravenscraft	7,620	24.11
Total votes		31,607	100.0

=== District 23 ===
Republican primary
Party	Candidate	Votes	%
Republican	Mandi Ballinger (incumbent)	4,297	100.0
Total votes		4,297	100.0

Democratic primary
Party	Candidate	Votes	%
Democratic	Adam Wynn	918	100.0
Total votes		918	100.0

23rd District general election
Party	Candidate	Votes	%
Republican	Mandi Ballinger (incumbent)	17,782	74.85
Democratic	Adam Wynn	5,974	25.15
Total votes		23,756	100.0

=== District 24 ===
Republican primary
Party	Candidate	Votes	%
Republican	Sheri Smallwood Gilligan (incumbent)	4,045	60.69
Republican	Joanna Cloud	2,620	39.31
Total votes		6,665	100.0

24th District general election
Party	Candidate	Votes	%
Republican	Sheri Smallwood Gilligan (incumbent)	23,646	100.0
Total votes		23,646	100.0
Republican hold			

=== District 25 ===
Republican primary
Party	Candidate	Votes	%
Republican	Todd Jones (incumbent)	6,140	74.07
Republican	Steven Grambergs	2,150	25.93
Total votes		8,290	100.0

Democratic primary
Party	Candidate	Votes	%
Democratic	Anita Holcomb Tucker	2,438	100.0
Total votes		2,438	100.0

25th District general election
Party	Candidate	Votes	%
Republican	Todd Jones (incumbent)	17,897	63.98
Democratic	Anita Holcomb Tucker	10,074	36.02
Total votes		27,971	100.0

=== District 26 ===
Republican primary
Party	Candidate	Votes	%
Republican	Marc Morris (incumbent)	5,973	100.0
Total votes		5,973	100.0

26th District general election
Party	Candidate	Votes	%
Republican	Marc Morris (incumbent)	24,544	100.0
Total votes		24,544	100.0
Republican hold			

=== District 27 ===
Republican primary
Party	Candidate	Votes	%
Republican	Lee Hawkins (incumbent)	4,751	100.0
Total votes		4,751	100.0

27th District general election
Party	Candidate	Votes	%
Republican	Lee Hawkins (incumbent)	18,400	100.0
Total votes		18,400	100.0
Republican hold			

=== District 28 ===
Republican primary
Party	Candidate	Votes	%
Republican	Chris Erwin	3,111	50.54
Republican	Dan Gasaway (incumbent)	3,044	49.46
Total votes		6,155	100.0

28th District general election
Party	Candidate	Votes	%
Republican	Chris Erwin		
Total votes			100.0
Republican hold			

=== District 29 ===
Republican primary
Party	Candidate	Votes	%
Republican	Matt Dubnik (incumbent)	2,754	100.0
Total votes		2,754	100.0

29th District general election
Party	Candidate	Votes	%
Republican	Matt Dubnik (incumbent)	9,728	67.92
Independent	Nancy Stead	4,595	32.08
Total votes		14,323	100.0

=== District 30 ===
Republican primary
Party	Candidate	Votes	%
Republican	Emory Dunahoo, Jr. (incumbent)	3,592	100.0
Total votes		3,592	100.0

Democratic primary
Party	Candidate	Votes	%
Democratic	Alana Watkins	631	64.85
Democratic	Patrick J. Anderson	342	35.15
Total votes		973	100.0

30th District general election
Party	Candidate	Votes	%
Republican	Emory Dunahoo, Jr. (incumbent)	14,358	72.82
Democratic	Alana Watkins	5,358	27.18
Total votes		19,716	100.0

=== District 31 ===
Republican primary
Party	Candidate	Votes	%
Republican	Tommy Benton (incumbent)	3,108	59.92
Republican	Samuel Thomas	2,079	40.08
Total votes		5,187	100.0

31st District general election
Party	Candidate	Votes	%
Republican	Tommy Benton (incumbent)	21,281	100.0
Total votes		21,281	100.0
Republican hold			

=== District 32 ===
Republican primary
Party	Candidate	Votes	%
Republican	Alan Powell (incumbent)	4,117	100.0
Total votes		4,117	100.0

32nd District general election
Party	Candidate	Votes	%
Republican	Alan Powell (incumbent)	18,065	100.0
Total votes		18,065	100.0
Republican hold			

=== District 33 ===
Republican primary
Party	Candidate	Votes	%
Republican	Tom McCall (incumbent)	5,132	100.0
Total votes		5,132	100.0

33rd District general election
Party	Candidate	Votes	%
Republican	Tom McCall (incumbent)	18,282	100.0
Total votes		18,282	100.0
Republican hold			

=== District 34 ===
Republican primary
Party	Candidate	Votes	%
Republican	Bert Reeves (incumbent)	3,083	100.0
Total votes		3,083	100.0

Democratic primary
Party	Candidate	Votes	%
Democratic	Matt Southwell	1,680	100.0
Total votes		1,680	100.0

34th District general election
Party	Candidate	Votes	%
Republican	Bert Reeves (incumbent)	13,581	57.67
Democratic	Matt Southwell	9,968	42.33
Total votes		23,549	100.0

=== District 35 ===
Democratic primary
Party	Candidate	Votes	%
Democratic	Salvatore Castellana	1,225	61.65
Democratic	Kyle Rinaudo	762	38.35
Total votes		1,987	100.0

Republican primary
Party	Candidate	Votes	%
Republican	Ed Setzler (incumbent)	2,215	100.0
Total votes		2,215	100.0

35th District general election
Party	Candidate	Votes	%
Democratic	Salvatore Castellana	10,775	47.70
Republican	Ed Setzler (incumbent)	11,816	52.30
Total votes		22,591	100.0

=== District 36 ===
Republican primary
Party	Candidate	Votes	%
Republican	Ginny Ehrhart	2,500	47.54
Republican	Thomas Gray	2,300	43.73
Republican	Rob Harrell	459	8.73
Total votes		5,259	100.0

Republican primary runoff
Party	Candidate	Votes	%
Republican	Ginny Ehrhart	3,487	51.48
Republican	Thomas Gray	3,287	48.52
Total votes		6,774	100.0

Democratic primary
Party	Candidate	Votes	%
Democratic	Jen Slipakoff	2,101	100.0
Total votes		2,101	100.0

36th District general election
Party	Candidate	Votes	%
Republican	Ginny Ehrhart	19,891	65.82
Democratic	Jen Slipakoff	10,329	34.19
Total votes		30,220	100.0

=== District 37 ===
Republican primary
Party	Candidate	Votes	%
Republican	Sam Teasley (incumbent)	3,012	100.0
Total votes		3,012	100.0

Democratic primary
Party	Candidate	Votes	%
Democratic	Mary Frances Williams	1,964	70.02
Democratic	Ragin Edwards	514	18.32
Democratic	Bill Bolton	327	11.66
Total votes		2,805	100.0

37th District general election
Party	Candidate	Votes	%
Republican	Sam Teasley (incumbent)	11,755	49.63
Democratic	Mary Frances Williams	11,928	50.37
Total votes		23,683	100.0

=== District 38 ===
Democratic primary
Party	Candidate	Votes	%
Democratic	David Wilkerson (incumbent)	3,433	100.0
Total votes		3,433	100.0

38th District general election
Party	Candidate	Votes	%
Democratic	David Wilkerson (incumbent)	19,321	100.0
Total votes		19,321	100.0
Democratic hold			

=== District 39 ===
Republican primary
Party	Candidate	Votes	%
Republican	James "J.W." Morrow, Jr.	667	100.0
Total votes		667	100.0

Democratic primary
Party	Candidate	Votes	%
Democratic	Erica Thomas (incumbent)	2,420	53.39
Democratic	Shelia Edwards	1,451	32.01
Democratic	Victoria Randle	414	9.13
Democratic	Tray S. Deadwyler	248	5.47
Total votes		4,533	100.0

39th District general election
Party	Candidate	Votes	%
Republican	James "J.W." Morrow, Jr.	3,345	16.77
Democratic	Erica Thomas (incumbent)	16,607	83.23
Total votes		19,952	100.0

=== District 40 ===
Republican primary
Party	Candidate	Votes	%
Republican	Matt Bentley	2,808	65.84
Republican	Taryn Bowman	1,457	34.16
Total votes		4,265	100.0

Democratic primary
Party	Candidate	Votes	%
Democratic	Sandra Bullock	2,260	58.05
Democratic	Erick E. Allen	1,633	41.95
Total votes		3,893	100.0

40th District general election
Party	Candidate	Votes	%
Republican	Matt Bentley	13,029	45.32
Democratic	Erick E. Allen	15,719	54.68
Total votes		28,748	100.0

=== District 41 ===
Republican primary
Party	Candidate	Votes	%
Republican	Deanna Harris	825	64.91
Republican	Bryan Almanza	446	35.09
Total votes		1,271	100.0

Democratic primary
Party	Candidate	Votes	%
Democratic	Michael Smith (incumbent)	2,240	100.0
Total votes		2,240	100.0

41st District general election
Party	Candidate	Votes	%
Republican	Deanna Harris	4,858	29.39
Democratic	Michael Smith (incumbent)	11,673	70.61
Total votes		16,531	100.0

=== District 42 ===
Democratic primary
Party	Candidate	Votes	%
Democratic	Teri Anulewicz (incumbent)	1,837	100.0
Total votes		1,837	100.0

42nd District general election
Party	Candidate	Votes	%
Democratic	Teri Anulewicz (incumbent)	12,830	100.0
Libertarian	Jay Strickland		
Total votes		12,830	100.0

=== District 43 ===
Republican primary
Party	Candidate	Votes	%
Republican	Sharon Cooper (incumbent)	3,034	100.0
Total votes		3,034	100.0

Democratic primary
Party	Candidate	Votes	%
Democratic	Luisa Wakeman	2,641	100.0
Total votes		2,641	100.0

43rd District general election
Party	Candidate	Votes	%
Republican	Sharon Cooper (incumbent)	13,122	51.56
Democratic	Luisa Wakeman	12,330	48.44
Total votes		25,452	100.0

=== District 44 ===
Democratic primary
Party	Candidate	Votes	%
Democratic	Chinita Allen	2,373	100.0
Total votes		2,373	100.0

Republican primary
Party	Candidate	Votes	%
Republican	Don L. Parsons (incumbent)	2,953	79.53
Republican	Homer Crothers	760	20.47
Total votes		3,713	100.0

44th District general election
Party	Candidate	Votes	%
Democratic	Chinita Allen	11,422	44.63
Republican	Don L. Parsons (incumbent)	14,170	55.37
Total votes		25,592	100.0

=== District 45 ===
Republican primary
Party	Candidate	Votes	%
Republican	Matt Dollar (incumbent)	4,087	100.0
Total votes		4,087	100.0

Democratic primary
Party	Candidate	Votes	%
Democratic	Essence Johnson	3,016	100.0
Total votes		3,016	100.0

45th District general election
Party	Candidate	Votes	%
Republican	Matt Dollar (incumbent)	17,003	59.28
Democratic	Essence Johnson	11,681	40.72
Total votes		28,684	100.0

=== District 46 ===
Republican primary
Party	Candidate	Votes	%
Republican	John Carson (incumbent)	3,823	100.0
Total votes		3,823	100.0

Democratic primary
Party	Candidate	Votes	%
Democratic	Karín Sandiford	2,384	100.0
Total votes		2,384	100.0

46th District general election
Party	Candidate	Votes	%
Republican	John Carson (incumbent)	17,466	61.82
Democratic	Karín Sandiford	10,789	38.18
Total votes		28,255	100.0

=== District 47 ===
Republican primary
Party	Candidate	Votes	%
Republican	Jan Jones (incumbent)	3,382	100.0
Total votes		3,382	100.0

Democratic primary
Party	Candidate	Votes	%
Democratic	Andrea Nugent	2,235	100.0
Total votes		2,235	100.0

47th District general election
Party	Candidate	Votes	%
Republican	Jan Jones (incumbent)	16,718	61.64
Democratic	Andrea Nugent	10,403	38.36
Total votes		27,121	100.0

=== District 48 ===
Republican primary
Party	Candidate	Votes	%
Republican	Betty Price (incumbent)	2,564	63.40
Republican	Jere Wood	1,480	36.60
Total votes		4,044	100.0

Democratic primary
Party	Candidate	Votes	%
Democratic	Mary Robichaux	2,365	100.0
Total votes		2,365	100.0

48th District general election
Party	Candidate	Votes	%
Republican	Betty Price (incumbent)	10,952	49.66
Democratic	Mary Robichaux	11,102	50.34
Total votes		22,054	100.0

=== District 49 ===
Democratic primary
Party	Candidate	Votes	%
Democratic	Krishan A. Bralley	1,630	100.0
Total votes		1,630	100.0

Republican primary
Party	Candidate	Votes	%
Republican	Charles E. "Chuck" Martin (incumbent)	3,200	100.0
Total votes		3,200	100.0

49th District general election
Party	Candidate	Votes	%
Democratic	Krishan A. Bralley	11,268	45.80
Republican	Charles E. "Chuck" Martin (incumbent)	13,334	54.20
Independent	Luanne Taylor		
Total votes		24,602	100.0

=== District 50 ===
Democratic primary
Party	Candidate	Votes	%
Democratic	Angelika Kausche	2,016	85.97
Democratic	Gaurav Phadke	329	14.03
Total votes		2,345	100.0

Republican primary
Party	Candidate	Votes	%
Republican	Kelly Stewart	1,942	80.28
Republican	Douglas Chanco	477	19.72
Total votes		2,419	100.0

50th District general election
Party	Candidate	Votes	%
Democratic	Angelika Kausche	11,015	50.73
Republican	Kelly Stewart	10,698	49.27
Total votes		21,713	100.0

=== District 51 ===
Republican primary
Party	Candidate	Votes	%
Republican	Alex B. Kaufman	2,256	100.0
Total votes		2,256	100.0

Democratic primary
Party	Candidate	Votes	%
Democratic	Josh McLaurin	2,559	100.0
Total votes		2,559	100.0

51st District general election
Party	Candidate	Votes	%
Republican	Alex B. Kaufman	11,767	48.43
Democratic	Josh McLaurin	12,531	51.57
Total votes		24,298	100.0

=== District 52 ===
Democratic primary
Party	Candidate	Votes	%
Democratic	Shea Roberts	3,238	100.0
Total votes		3,238	100.0

Republican primary
Party	Candidate	Votes	%
Republican	Deborah Silcox (incumbent)	3,097	72.16
Republican	Gavi Shapiro	1,195	27.84
Total votes		4,292	100.0

52nd District general election
Party	Candidate	Votes	%
Democratic	Shea Roberts	12,796	47.72
Republican	Deborah Silcox (incumbent)	14,018	52.28
Total votes		26,814	100.0

=== District 53 ===
Democratic primary
Party	Candidate	Votes	%
Democratic	Sheila Jones (incumbent)	4,906	100.0
Total votes		4,906	100.0

53rd District general election
Party	Candidate	Votes	%
Democratic	Sheila Jones (incumbent)	20,032	100.0
Total votes		20,032	100.0
Democratic hold			

=== District 54 ===
Republican primary
Party	Candidate	Votes	%
Republican	Beth Beskin (incumbent)	3,354	100.0
Total votes		3,354	100.0

Democratic primary
Party	Candidate	Votes	%
Democratic	Betsy Holland	2,373	60.64
Democratic	Dan Berschinski	1,126	28.78
Democratic	Robert W. "Bob" Gibeling	414	10.58
Total votes		3,913	100.0

54th District general election
Party	Candidate	Votes	%
Republican	Beth Beskin (incumbent)	14,179	48.29
Democratic	Betsy Holland	15,186	51.71
Total votes		29,365	100.0

=== District 55 ===
Democratic primary
Party	Candidate	Votes	%
Democratic	Marie R. Metze (incumbent)	6,744	100.0
Total votes		6,744	100.0

55th District general election
Party	Candidate	Votes	%
Democratic	Marie R. Metze (incumbent)	23,310	100.0
Total votes		23,310	100.0
Democratic hold			

=== District 56 ===
Democratic primary
Party	Candidate	Votes	%
Democratic	"Able" Mable Thomas (incumbent)	3,229	75.20
Democratic	Will Chandler	611	14.23
Democratic	Darryl J. Terry II	454	10.57
Total votes		4,294	100.0

56th District general election
Party	Candidate	Votes	%
Democratic	"Able" Mable Thomas (incumbent)	16,311	100.0
Total votes		16,311	100.0
Democratic hold			

=== District 57 ===
Democratic primary
Party	Candidate	Votes	%
Democratic	Pat Gardner (incumbent)	5,020	81.07
Democratic	John T. Williams	1,172	18.93
Total votes		6,192	100.0

57th District general election
Party	Candidate	Votes	%
Democratic	Pat Gardner (incumbent)	24,886	100.0
Total votes		24,886	100.0
Democratic hold			

=== District 58 ===
Democratic primary
Party	Candidate	Votes	%
Democratic	Park Cannon (incumbent)	4,242	67.63
Democratic	Bonnie Clark	2,030	32.37
Total votes		6,272	100.0

58th District general election
Party	Candidate	Votes	%
Democratic	Park Cannon (incumbent)	23,663	100.0
Total votes		23,663	100.0
Democratic hold			

=== District 59 ===
Democratic primary
Party	Candidate	Votes	%
Democratic	David Dreyer (incumbent)	5,304	100.0
Total votes		5,304	100.0

59th District general election
Party	Candidate	Votes	%
Democratic	David Dreyer (incumbent)	20,727	100.0
Total votes		20,727	100.0
Democratic hold			

=== District 60 ===
Democratic primary
Party	Candidate	Votes	%
Democratic	Kim Schofield (incumbent)	2,450	55.35
Democratic	Jozmond Black	1,976	44.65
Total votes		4,426	100.0

60th District general election
Party	Candidate	Votes	%
Democratic	Kim Schofield (incumbent)	16,108	100.0
Total votes		16,108	100.0
Democratic hold			

=== District 61 ===
Democratic primary
Party	Candidate	Votes	%
Democratic	Roger Bruce (incumbent)	5,085	100.0
Total votes		5,085	100.0

61st District general election
Party	Candidate	Votes	%
Democratic	Roger Bruce (incumbent)	20,043	100.0
Total votes		20,043	100.0
Democratic hold			

=== District 62 ===
Democratic primary
Party	Candidate	Votes	%
Democratic	William K. Boddie, Jr. (incumbent)	4,134	58.37
Democratic	Valerie V. Vie	2,948	41.63
Total votes		7,082	100.0

62nd District general election
Party	Candidate	Votes	%
Democratic	William K. Boddie, Jr. (incumbent)	23,959	100.0
Total votes		23,959	100.0
Democratic hold			

=== District 63 ===
Democratic primary
Party	Candidate	Votes	%
Democratic	Debra Bazemore (incumbent)	3,342	58.66
Democratic	Linda Pritchett	2,355	41.34
Total votes		5,697	100.0

63rd District general election
Party	Candidate	Votes	%
Democratic	Debra Bazemore (incumbent)	20,872	100.0
Total votes		20,872	100.0
Democratic hold			

=== District 64 ===
Democratic primary
Party	Candidate	Votes	%
Democratic	Derrick L. Jackson (incumbent)	5,038	100.0
Total votes		5,038	100.0

64th District general election
Party	Candidate	Votes	%
Democratic	Derrick L. Jackson (incumbent)	21,257	100.0
Total votes		21,257	100.0
Democratic hold			

=== District 65 ===
Democratic primary
Party	Candidate	Votes	%
Democratic	Sharon Beasley-Teague (incumbent)	2,907	55.97
Democratic	Mandisha A. Thomas	2,287	44.03
Total votes		5,194	100.0

65th District general election
Party	Candidate	Votes	%
Democratic	Sharon Beasley-Teague (incumbent)	21,289	100.0
Total votes		21,289	100.0
Democratic hold			

=== District 66 ===
Democratic primary
Party	Candidate	Votes	%
Democratic	Kimberly Alexander (incumbent)	3,080	100.0
Total votes		3,080	100.0

66th District general election
Party	Candidate	Votes	%
Democratic	Kimberly Alexander (incumbent)	17,434	100.0
Total votes		17,434	100.0
Democratic hold			

=== District 67 ===
Republican primary
Party	Candidate	Votes	%
Republican	Micah Gravley (incumbent)	3,141	100.0
Total votes		3,141	100.0

67th District general election
Party	Candidate	Votes	%
Republican	Micah Gravley (incumbent)	17,029	100.0
Total votes		17,029	100.0
Republican hold			

=== District 68 ===
Republican primary
Party	Candidate	Votes	%
Republican	J. Collins (incumbent)	3,744	100.0
Total votes		3,744	100.0

68th District general election
Party	Candidate	Votes	%
Republican	J. Collins (incumbent)	18,146	100.0
Total votes		18,146	100.0
Republican hold			

=== District 69 ===
Republican primary
Party	Candidate	Votes	%
Republican	Randy Nix (incumbent)	5,177	100.0
Total votes		5,177	100.0

69th District general election
Party	Candidate	Votes	%
Republican	Randy Nix (incumbent)	18,063	100.0
Total votes		18,063	100.0
Republican hold			

=== District 70 ===
Republican primary
Party	Candidate	Votes	%
Republican	Lynn Smith (incumbent)	3,208	100.0
Total votes		3,208	100.0

70th District general election
Party	Candidate	Votes	%
Republican	Lynn Smith (incumbent)	18,473	100.0
Total votes		18,473	100.0
Republican hold			

=== District 71 ===
Republican primary
Party	Candidate	Votes	%
Republican	David Stover (incumbent)	2,951	64.35
Republican	Samuel Anders	1,635	35.65
Total votes		4,586	100.0

Democratic primary
Party	Candidate	Votes	%
Democratic	Tom Thomason	1,312	100.0
Total votes		1,312	100.0

71st District general election
Party	Candidate	Votes	%
Republican	David Stover (incumbent)	19,690	74.43
Democratic	Tom Thomason	6,765	25.57
Total votes		26,455	100.0

=== District 72 ===
Republican primary
Party	Candidate	Votes	%
Republican	Josh Bonner (incumbent)	4,224	71.02
Republican	Mary Kay Bacallao	1,724	28.98
Total votes		5,948	100.0

72nd District general election
Party	Candidate	Votes	%
Republican	Josh Bonner (incumbent)	24,429	100.0
Total votes		24,429	100.0
Republican hold			

=== District 73 ===
Republican primary
Party	Candidate	Votes	%
Republican	Karen Mathiak (incumbent)	3,750	100.0
Total votes		3,750	100.0

73rd District general election
Party	Candidate	Votes	%
Republican	Karen Mathiak (incumbent)	17,210	100.0
Total votes		17,210	100.0
Republican hold			

=== District 74 ===
Democratic primary
Party	Candidate	Votes	%
Democratic	Valencia Stovall (incumbent)	2,202	66.41
Democratic	Junior Jackson	1,114	33.59
Total votes		3,316	100.0

74th District general election
Party	Candidate	Votes	%
Democratic	Valencia Stovall (incumbent)	14,533	100.0
Total votes		14,533	100.0
Democratic hold			

=== District 75 ===
Democratic primary
Party	Candidate	Votes	%
Democratic	Mike Glanton (incumbent)	2,783	66.96
Democratic	Tony Barlow	1,373	33.04
Total votes		4,156	100.0

75th District general election
Party	Candidate	Votes	%
Democratic	Mike Glanton (incumbent)	17,817	100.0
Total votes		17,817	100.0
Democratic hold			

=== District 76 ===
Democratic primary
Party	Candidate	Votes	%
Democratic	Sandra Givens Scott (incumbent)	5,240	100.0
Total votes		5,240	100.0

76th District general election
Party	Candidate	Votes	%
Democratic	Sandra Givens Scott (incumbent)	20,350	100.0
Total votes		20,350	100.0
Democratic hold			

=== District 77 ===
Democratic primary
Party	Candidate	Votes	%
Democratic	Rhonda Burnough (incumbent)	2,856	100.0
Total votes		2,856	100.0

77th District general election
Party	Candidate	Votes	%
Democratic	Rhonda Burnough (incumbent)	15,480	100.0
Total votes		15,480	100.0
Democratic hold			

=== District 78 ===
Democratic primary
Party	Candidate	Votes	%
Democratic	Demetrius Douglas (incumbent)	4,357	100.0
Total votes		4,357	100.0

78th District general election
Party	Candidate	Votes	%
Democratic	Demetrius Douglas (incumbent)	19,347	100.0
Total votes		19,347	100.0
Democratic hold			

=== District 79 ===
Democratic primary
Party	Candidate	Votes	%
Democratic	Michael S. Wilensky	2,898	100.0
Total votes		2,898	100.0

Republican primary
Party	Candidate	Votes	%
Republican	Ken Wright	2,547	100.0
Total votes		2,547	100.0

79th District general election
Party	Candidate	Votes	%
Democratic	Michael S. Wilensky	12,441	53.83
Republican	Ken Wright	10,670	46.17
Total votes		23,111	100.0

=== District 80 ===
Republican primary
Party	Candidate	Votes	%
Republican	Meagan Hanson (incumbent)	2,126	100.0
Total votes		2,126	100.0

Democratic primary
Party	Candidate	Votes	%
Democratic	Matthew Wilson	2,865	100.0
Total votes		2,865	100.0

80th District general election
Party	Candidate	Votes	%
Republican	Meagan Hanson (incumbent)	11,389	47.52
Democratic	Matthew Wilson	12,578	52.48
Total votes		23,967	100.0

=== District 81 ===
Republican primary
Party	Candidate	Votes	%
Republican	Ellen Diehl	1,309	100.0
Total votes		1,309	100.0

Democratic primary
Party	Candidate	Votes	%
Democratic	Scott Holcomb (incumbent)	2,333	74.32
Democratic	Hamid Noori	806	25.68
Total votes		3,139	100.0

81st District general election
Party	Candidate	Votes	%
Republican	Ellen Diehl	6,334	35.91
Democratic	Scott Holcomb (incumbent)	11,304	64.09
Total votes		17,638	100.0

=== District 82 ===
Democratic primary
Party	Candidate	Votes	%
Democratic	Mary Margaret Oliver (incumbent)	4,398	100.0
Total votes		4,398	100.0

82nd District general election
Party	Candidate	Votes	%
Democratic	Mary Margaret Oliver (incumbent)	18,015	100.0
Total votes		18,015	100.0
Democratic hold			

=== District 83 ===
Democratic primary
Party	Candidate	Votes	%
Democratic	Becky Evans	5,600	64.63
Democratic	Howard Mosby (incumbent)	3,065	35.37
Total votes		8,665	100.0

83rd District general election
Party	Candidate	Votes	%
Democratic	Becky Evans	25,187	100.0
Total votes		25,187	100.0
Democratic hold			

=== District 84 ===
Democratic primary
Party	Candidate	Votes	%
Democratic	Renitta Shannon (incumbent)	8,040	100.0
Total votes		8,040	100.0

84th District general election
Party	Candidate	Votes	%
Democratic	Renitta Shannon (incumbent)	26,038	100.0
Total votes		26,038	100.0
Democratic hold			

=== District 85 ===
Democratic primary
Party	Candidate	Votes	%
Democratic	Karla Drenner (incumbent)	4,922	100.0
Total votes		4,922	100.0

85th District general election
Party	Candidate	Votes	%
Democratic	Karla Drenner (incumbent)	18,544	100.0
Total votes		18,544	100.0
Democratic hold			

=== District 86 ===
Democratic primary
Party	Candidate	Votes	%
Democratic	Michele Henson (incumbent)	3,984	71.56
Democratic	Joscelyn C. O'Neil	1,583	28.44
Total votes		5,567	100.0

86th District general election
Party	Candidate	Votes	%
Democratic	Michele Henson (incumbent)	19,236	100.0
Total votes		19,236	100.0
Democratic hold			

=== District 87 ===
Democratic primary
Party	Candidate	Votes	%
Democratic	Viola Davis	3,546	56.03
Democratic	Earnest "Coach" Williams (incumbent)	2,783	43.97
Total votes		6,329	100.0

87th District general election
Party	Candidate	Votes	%
Democratic	Viola Davis	21,468	100.0
Total votes		21,468	100.0
Democratic hold			

=== District 88 ===
Democratic primary
Party	Candidate	Votes	%
Democratic	Billy Mitchell (incumbent)	4,680	100.0
Total votes		4,680	100.0

88th District general election
Party	Candidate	Votes	%
Independent	Joshua Hampton		
Democratic	Billy Mitchell (incumbent)	18,774	100.0
Total votes		18,774	100.0

=== District 89 ===
Democratic primary
Party	Candidate	Votes	%
Democratic	Bee Nguyen (incumbent)	8,593	100.0
Total votes		8,593	100.0

89th District general election
Party	Candidate	Votes	%
Democratic	Bee Nguyen (incumbent)	27,810	100.0
Total votes		27,810	100.0
Democratic hold			

=== District 90 ===
Democratic primary
Party	Candidate	Votes	%
Democratic	Pam Stephenson (incumbent)	5,438	73.72
Democratic	Gregory Shealey	1,939	26.28
Total votes		7,377	100.0

Republican primary
Party	Candidate	Votes	%
Republican	Takosha Swan	1,254	100.0
Total votes		1,254	100.0

90th District general election
Party	Candidate	Votes	%
Democratic	Pam Stephenson (incumbent)	21,038	79.92
Republican	Takosha Swan	5,286	20.08
Total votes		26,324	100.0

=== District 91 ===
Democratic primary
Party	Candidate	Votes	%
Democratic	Vernon Jones (incumbent)	5,505	100.0
Total votes		5,505	100.0

91st District general election
Party	Candidate	Votes	%
Democratic	Vernon Jones (incumbent)	21,329	100.0
Total votes		21,329	100.0
Democratic hold			

=== District 92 ===
Democratic primary
Party	Candidate	Votes	%
Democratic	Doreen Carter (incumbent)	3,575	100.0
Total votes		3,575	100.0

92nd District general election
Party	Candidate	Votes	%
Democratic	Doreen Carter (incumbent)	16,246	100.0
Independent	Linda Davis		
Independent	Raymond Davis		
Total votes		16,246	100.0

=== District 93 ===
Democratic primary
Party	Candidate	Votes	%
Democratic	Dar'shun Kendrick (incumbent)	5,200	100.0
Total votes		5,200	100.0

93rd District general election
Party	Candidate	Votes	%
Democratic	Dar'shun Kendrick (incumbent)	23,221	100.0
Total votes		23,221	100.0
Democratic hold			

=== District 94 ===
Democratic primary
Party	Candidate	Votes	%
Democratic	Karen Bennett (incumbent)	4,358	79.27
Democratic	L. Dean Heard	1,140	20.73
Total votes		5,498	100.0

94th District general election
Party	Candidate	Votes	%
Democratic	Karen Bennett (incumbent)	20,984	100.0
Total votes		20,984	100.0
Democratic hold			

=== District 95 ===
Republican primary
Party	Candidate	Votes	%
Republican	Scott Hilton (incumbent)	2,670	100.0
Total votes		2,670	100.0

Democratic primary
Party	Candidate	Votes	%
Democratic	Beth Moore	2,453	100.0
Total votes		2,453	100.0

95th District general election
Party	Candidate	Votes	%
Republican	Scott Hilton (incumbent)	11,442	48.60
Democratic	Beth Moore	12,101	51.40
Total votes		23,543	100.0

=== District 96 ===
Democratic primary
Party	Candidate	Votes	%
Democratic	Pedro "Pete" Marin (incumbent)	1,501	100.0
Total votes		1,501	100.0

96th District general election
Party	Candidate	Votes	%
Democratic	Pedro "Pete" Marin (incumbent)	10,810	100.0
Total votes		10,810	100.0
Democratic hold			

=== District 97 ===
Republican primary
Party	Candidate	Votes	%
Republican	Bonnie Rich	1,072	33.22
Republican	Kipper Tabb	788	24.42
Republican	Scott LeCraw	664	20.58
Republican	Indran Krishnan	295	9.14
Republican	Louis Tseng	273	8.46
Republican	Judson McClure	135	4.18
Total votes		3,227	100.0

Republican primary runoff
Party	Candidate	Votes	%
Republican	Bonnie Rich	2,321	61.60
Republican	Kipper Tabb	1,447	38.40
Total votes		3,768	100.0

Democratic primary
Party	Candidate	Votes	%
Democratic	Aisha Yaqoob	1,733	71.20
Democratic	Wayne Slear	701	28.80
Total votes		2,434	100.0

97th District general election
Party	Candidate	Votes	%
Republican	Bonnie Rich	13,538	55.86
Democratic	Aisha Yaqoob	10,696	44.14
Total votes		24,234	100.0

=== District 98 ===
Republican primary
Party	Candidate	Votes	%
Republican	David Clark (incumbent)	2,406	100.0
Total votes		2,406	100.0

98th District general election
Party	Candidate	Votes	%
Republican	David Clark (incumbent)	17,529	100.0
Total votes		17,529	100.0
Republican hold			

=== District 99 ===
Democratic primary
Party	Candidate	Votes	%
Democratic	Brenda Lopez Romero (incumbent)	1,082	77.12
Democratic	Shawn Allen	321	22.88
Total votes		1,403	100.0

99th District general election
Party	Candidate	Votes	%
Democratic	Brenda Lopez Romero (incumbent)	7,362	100.0
Total votes		7,362	100.0
Democratic hold			

=== District 100 ===
Democratic primary
Party	Candidate	Votes	%
Democratic	Dewey L. McClain (incumbent)	1,467	100.0
Total votes		1,467	100.0

100th District general election
Party	Candidate	Votes	%
Democratic	Dewey L. McClain (incumbent)	10,668	100.0
Total votes		10,668	100.0
Democratic hold			

=== District 101 ===
Republican primary
Party	Candidate	Votes	%
Republican	Valerie Clark	1,890	100.0
Total votes		1,890	100.0

Democratic primary
Party	Candidate	Votes	%
Democratic	Sam Park (incumbent)	2,174	100.0
Total votes		2,174	100.0

101st District general election
Party	Candidate	Votes	%
Republican	Valerie Clark	8,027	41.19
Democratic	Sam Park (incumbent)	11,459	58.81
Total votes		19,486	100.0

=== District 102 ===
Republican primary
Party	Candidate	Votes	%
Republican	Paula Hastings	1,064	43.43
Republican	Zach Procter	712	29.06
Republican	Kellie Pollard Austin	674	27.51
Total votes		2,450	100.0

Republican primary runoff
Party	Candidate	Votes	%
Republican	Paula Hastings	1,737	64.19
Republican	Zach Procter	969	35.81
Total votes		2,706	100.0

Democratic primary
Party	Candidate	Votes	%
Democratic	Gregg Kennard	1,528	71.44
Democratic	Tony Scalzitti	611	28.56
Total votes		2,139	100.0

102nd District general election
Party	Candidate	Votes	%
Republican	Paula Hastings	10,033	48.59
Democratic	Gregg Kennard	10,617	51.41
Independent	Richard Smith		
Total votes		20,650	100.0

=== District 103 ===
Republican primary
Party	Candidate	Votes	%
Republican	Timothy Barr (incumbent)	3,554	100.0
Total votes		3,554	100.0

103rd District general election
Party	Candidate	Votes	%
Republican	Timothy Barr (incumbent)	21,512	100.0
Total votes		21,512	100.0
Republican hold			

=== District 104 ===
Republican primary
Party	Candidate	Votes	%
Republican	Chuck Efstration (incumbent)	2,371	100.0
Total votes		2,371	100.0

Democratic primary
Party	Candidate	Votes	%
Democratic	Andrea Stephenson	2,050	100.0
Total votes		2,050	100.0

104th District general election
Party	Candidate	Votes	%
Republican	Chuck Efstration (incumbent)	13,493	53.37
Democratic	Andrea Stephenson	11,790	46.63
Total votes		25,283	100.0

=== District 105 ===
Democratic primary
Party	Candidate	Votes	%
Democratic	Donna McLeod	3,012	100.0
Total votes		3,012	100.0

Republican primary
Party	Candidate	Votes	%
Republican	Donna Sheldon	1,287	45.06
Republican	Robin Mauck	1,259	44.08
Republican	Patrick Batubenge	310	10.85
Total votes		2,856	100.0

Republican primary runoff
Party	Candidate	Votes	%
Republican	Donna Sheldon	1,805	54.06
Republican	Robin Mauck	1,534	45.94
Total votes		3,339	100.0

105th District general election
Party	Candidate	Votes	%
Democratic	Donna McLeod	14,335	58.37
Republican	Donna Sheldon	10,224	41.63
Total votes		24,559	100.0

=== District 106 ===
Republican primary
Party	Candidate	Votes	%
Republican	Brett Harrell (incumbent)	2,573	100.0
Total votes		2,573	100.0

106th District general election
Party	Candidate	Votes	%
Republican	Brett Harrell (incumbent)	14,973	100.0
Total votes		14,973	100.0
Republican hold			

=== District 107 ===
Democratic primary
Party	Candidate	Votes	%
Democratic	Shelly Hutchinson	2,347	80.49
Democratic	Ken Montano	569	19.51
Total votes		2,916	100.0

Republican primary
Party	Candidate	Votes	%
Republican	Janet Mihoci	1,897	100.0
Total votes		1,897	100.0

107th District general election
Party	Candidate	Votes	%
Democratic	Shelly Hutchinson	12,425	58.79
Republican	Janet Mihoci	8,709	41.21
Total votes		21,134	100.0

=== District 108 ===
Democratic primary
Party	Candidate	Votes	%
Democratic	Jasmine Clark	2,351	100.0
Total votes		2,351	100.0

Republican primary
Party	Candidate	Votes	%
Republican	Clay Cox (incumbent)	2,842	100.0
Total votes		2,842	100.0

108th District general election
Party	Candidate	Votes	%
Democratic	Jasmine Clark	10,877	50.68
Republican	Clay Cox (incumbent)	10,585	49.32
Total votes		21,462	100.0

=== District 109 ===
Democratic primary
Party	Candidate	Votes	%
Democratic	Regina Lewis-Ward	2,174	58.00
Democratic	Denise Gaines-Edmond	1,574	42.00
Total votes		3,748	100.0

Republican primary
Party	Candidate	Votes	%
Republican	Dale Rutledge (incumbent)	3,285	71.74
Republican	J. Blake Prince	1,294	28.26
Total votes		4,579	100.0

109th District general election
Party	Candidate	Votes	%
Democratic	Regina Lewis-Ward	13,027	48.46
Republican	Dale Rutledge (incumbent)	13,855	51.54
Total votes		26,882	100.0

=== District 110 ===
Republican primary
Party	Candidate	Votes	%
Republican	Andy Welch (incumbent)	3,004	100.0
Total votes		3,004	100.0

110th District general election
Party	Candidate	Votes	%
Republican	Andy Welch (incumbent)	16,046	100.0
Total votes		16,046	100.0
Republican hold			

=== District 111 ===
Republican primary
Party	Candidate	Votes	%
Republican	Geoff Cauble (incumbent)	2,987	100.0
Total votes		2,987	100.0

Democratic primary
Party	Candidate	Votes	%
Democratic	Tarji Leonard Dunn	1,713	43.96
Democratic	El-Mahdi Holly	1,284	32.95
Democratic	I. Darryl Payton	900	23.09
Total votes		3,897	100.0

Democratic primary runoff
Party	Candidate	Votes	%
Democratic	El-Mahdi Holly	1,315	58.86
Democratic	Tarji Leonard Dunn	919	41.14
Total votes		2,234	100.0

111th District general election
Party	Candidate	Votes	%
Republican	Geoff Cauble (incumbent)	12,385	43.41
Democratic	El-Mahdi Holly	16,143	56.59
Total votes		28,528	100.0

=== District 112 ===
Republican primary
Party	Candidate	Votes	%
Republican	Dave Belton (incumbent)	4,849	100.0
Total votes		4,849	100.0

112th District general election
Party	Candidate	Votes	%
Republican	Dave Belton (incumbent)	20,912	100.0
Total votes		20.912	100.0
Republican hold			

=== District 113 ===
Democratic primary
Party	Candidate	Votes	%
Democratic	Pam Dickerson (incumbent)	2,739	62.68
Democratic	Sharon Henderson	1,631	37.32
Total votes		4,370	100.0

113th District general election
Party	Candidate	Votes	%
Democratic	Pam Dickerson (incumbent)	18,610	100.0
Total votes		18,610	100.0
Democratic hold			

=== District 114 ===
Republican primary
Party	Candidate	Votes	%
Republican	Tom Kirby (incumbent)	3,697	100.0
Total votes		3,697	100.0

114th District general election
Party	Candidate	Votes	%
Republican	Tom Kirby (incumbent)	20,281	100.0
Independent	Femi Oduwole		
Total votes		20,281	100.0

=== District 115 ===
Republican primary
Party	Candidate	Votes	%
Republican	Bruce Williamson (incumbent)	4,395	100.0
Total votes		4,395	100.0

115th District general election
Party	Candidate	Votes	%
Republican	Bruce Williamson (incumbent)	19,935	100.0
Total votes		19,935	100.0
Republican hold			

=== District 116 ===
Republican primary
Party	Candidate	Votes	%
Republican	Terry England (incumbent)	3,616	100.0
Total votes		3,616	100.0

116th District general election
Party	Candidate	Votes	%
Republican	Terry England (incumbent)	17,569	100.0
Total votes		17,569	100.0
Republican hold			

=== District 117 ===
Republican primary
Party	Candidate	Votes	%
Republican	Houston Gaines	3,758	100.0
Total votes		3,758	100.0

Democratic primary
Party	Candidate	Votes	%
Democratic	Deborah Gonzalez (incumbent)	3,965	100.0
Total votes		3,965	100.0

117th District general election
Party	Candidate	Votes	%
Republican	Houston Gaines	13,164	53.55
Democratic	Deborah Gonzalez (incumbent)	11,418	46.45
Total votes		24,582	100.0

=== District 118 ===
Democratic primary
Party	Candidate	Votes	%
Democratic	Spencer Frye (incumbent)	4,690	100.0
Total votes		4,690	100.0

118th District general election
Party	Candidate	Votes	%
Democratic	Spencer Frye (incumbent)	15,558	100.0
Total votes		15,558	100.0
Democratic hold			

=== District 119 ===
Republican primary
Party	Candidate	Votes	%
Republican	Marcus A. Wiedower	2,985	61.57
Republican	Steven Strickland	1,863	38.43
Total votes		4,848	100.0

Democratic primary
Party	Candidate	Votes	%
Democratic	Jonathan Wallace (incumbent)	3,655	100.0
Total votes		3,655	100.0

119th District general election
Party	Candidate	Votes	%
Democratic	Jonathan Wallace (incumbent)	11,929	47.22
Republican	Marcus A. Wiedower	13,336	52.78
Total votes		25,265	100.0

=== District 120 ===
Republican primary
Party	Candidate	Votes	%
Republican	Trey Rhodes (incumbent)	4,328	100.0
Total votes		4,328	100.0

Democratic primary
Party	Candidate	Votes	%
Democratic	Charles "Chuck" Hogg	1,949	100.0
Total votes		1,949	100.0

120th District general election
Party	Candidate	Votes	%
Democratic	Charles "Chuck" Hogg	7,909	31.61
Republican	Trey Rhodes (incumbent)	17,110	68.39
Total votes		25,019	100.0

=== District 121 ===
Republican primary
Party	Candidate	Votes	%
Republican	Barry Fleming (incumbent)	4,098	100.0
Total votes		4,098	100.0

121st District general election
Party	Candidate	Votes	%
Republican	Barry Fleming (incumbent)	19,114	100.0
Total votes		19,114	100.0
Republican hold			

=== District 122 ===
Republican primary
Party	Candidate	Votes	%
Republican	Jodi Lott (incumbent)	6,704	100.0
Total votes		6,704	100.0

122nd District general election
Party	Candidate	Votes	%
Republican	Jodi Lott (incumbent)	24,189	100.0
Total votes		24,189	100.0
Republican hold			

=== District 123 ===
Republican primary
Party	Candidate	Votes	%
Republican	Mark Newton (incumbent)	6,301	100.0
Total votes		6,301	100.0

Democratic primary
Party	Candidate	Votes	%
Democratic	Scott Richard	2,169	100.0
Total votes		2,169	100.0

123rd District general election
Party	Candidate	Votes	%
Republican	Mark Newton (incumbent)	16,044	66.86
Democratic	Scott Richard	7,953	33.14
Total votes		23,997	100.0

=== District 124 ===
Democratic primary
Party	Candidate	Votes	%
Democratic	Henry "Wayne" Howard (incumbent)	3,549	100.0
Total votes		3,549	100.0

124th District general election
Party	Candidate	Votes	%
Democratic	Henry "Wayne" Howard (incumbent)	13,099	100.0
Total votes		13,099	100.0
Democratic hold			

=== District 125 ===
Democratic primary
Party	Candidate	Votes	%
Democratic	Sheila Clark Nelson (incumbent)	3,453	100.0
Total votes		3,453	100.0

125th District general election
Party	Candidate	Votes	%
Democratic	Sheila Clark Nelson (incumbent)	13,564	100.0
Total votes		13,564	100.0
Democratic hold			

=== District 126 ===
Democratic primary
Party	Candidate	Votes	%
Democratic	Gloria Frazier (incumbent)	5,175	100.0
Total votes		5,175	100.0

Republican primary
Party	Candidate	Votes	%
Republican	William Harris	1,446	100.0
Total votes		1,446	100.0

126th District general election
Party	Candidate	Votes	%
Democratic	Gloria Frazier (incumbent)	14,840	69.53
Republican	William Harris	6,503	30.47
Total votes		21,343	100.0

=== District 127 ===
Democratic primary
Party	Candidate	Votes	%
Democratic	Brian L. Prince (incumbent)	4,221	100.0
Total votes		4,221	100.0

127th District general election
Party	Candidate	Votes	%
Democratic	Brian L. Prince (incumbent)	14,554	100.0
Total votes		14,554	100.0
Democratic hold			

=== District 128 ===
Democratic primary
Party	Candidate	Votes	%
Democratic	Mack Jackson (incumbent)	4,214	100.0
Total votes		4,214	100.0

Republican primary
Party	Candidate	Votes	%
Republican	Jackson Williams	1,872	100.0
Total votes		1,872	100.0

128th District general election
Party	Candidate	Votes	%
Democratic	Mack Jackson (incumbent)	11,113	57.01
Republican	Jackson Williams	8,379	42.99
Total votes		19,492	100.0

=== District 129 ===
Republican primary
Party	Candidate	Votes	%
Republican	Susan Holmes (incumbent)	3,753	100.0
Total votes		3,753	100.0

129th District general election
Party	Candidate	Votes	%
Republican	Susan Holmes (incumbent)	17,652	100.0
Total votes		17,652	100.0
Republican hold			

=== District 130 ===
Republican primary
Party	Candidate	Votes	%
Republican	David Knight (incumbent)	3,703	78.24
Republican	Raymond Ray	1,030	21.76
Total votes		4,733	100.0

130th District general election
Party	Candidate	Votes	%
Republican	David Knight (incumbent)	15,764	100.0
Total votes		15,764	100.0
Republican hold			

=== District 131 ===
Democratic primary
Party	Candidate	Votes	%
Democratic	Chris Benton	1,202	100.0
Total votes		1,202	100.0

Republican primary
Party	Candidate	Votes	%
Republican	Ken Pullin	3,943	63.09
Republican	Johnnie Caldwell (incumbent)	2,307	36.91
Total votes		6,250	100.0

131st District general election
Party	Candidate	Votes	%
Democratic	Chris Benton	5,810	26.25
Republican	Ken Pullin	16,323	73.75
Total votes		22,133	100.0

=== District 132 ===
Republican primary
Party	Candidate	Votes	%
Republican	Leonard Gomez	1,741	100.0
Total votes		1,741	100.0

Democratic primary
Party	Candidate	Votes	%
Democratic	Bob Trammell, Jr. (incumbent)	1,476	100.0
Total votes		1,476	100.0

132nd District general election
Party	Candidate	Votes	%
Democratic	Bob Trammell, Jr. (incumbent)	8,903	52.20
Republican	Leonard Gomez	8,154	47.80
Total votes		17,057	100.0

=== District 133 ===
Republican primary
Party	Candidate	Votes	%
Republican	Vance Smith	5,106	84.45
Republican	Christopher Gyening	940	15.55
Total votes		6,046	100.0

133rd District general election
Party	Candidate	Votes	%
Republican	Vance Smith	20,118	100.0
Total votes		20,118	100.0
Republican hold			

=== District 134 ===
Republican primary
Party	Candidate	Votes	%
Republican	Richard H. Smith (incumbent)	4,119	100.0
Total votes		4,119	100.0

134th District general election
Party	Candidate	Votes	%
Republican	Richard H. Smith (incumbent)	17,336	100.0
Total votes		17,336	100.0
Republican hold			

=== District 135 ===
Democratic primary
Party	Candidate	Votes	%
Democratic	Calvin Smyre (incumbent)	2,526	100.0
Total votes		2,526	100.0

135th District general election
Party	Candidate	Votes	%
Democratic	Calvin Smyre (incumbent)	9,538	100.0
Total votes		9,538	100.0
Democratic hold			

=== District 136 ===
Democratic primary
Party	Candidate	Votes	%
Democratic	Carolyn Hugley (incumbent)	4,639	100.0
Total votes		4,639	100.0

136th District general election
Party	Candidate	Votes	%
Democratic	Carolyn Hugley (incumbent)	15,271	100.0
Total votes		15,271	100.0
Democratic hold			

=== District 137 ===
Democratic primary
Party	Candidate	Votes	%
Democratic	Debbie G. Buckner (incumbent)	3,929	100.0
Total votes		3,929	100.0

137th District general election
Party	Candidate	Votes	%
Democratic	Debbie G. Buckner (incumbent)	17,183	100.0
Total votes		17,183	100.0
Democratic hold			

=== District 138 ===
Republican primary
Party	Candidate	Votes	%
Republican	Mike Cheokas	1,739	61.67
Republican	Herschel Smith	1,081	38.33
Total votes		2,820	100.0

Democratic primary
Party	Candidate	Votes	%
Democratic	Bardin Hooks	1,794	100.0
Total votes		1,794	100.0

138th District general election
Party	Candidate	Votes	%
Republican	Mike Cheokas	7,662	51.79
Democratic	Bardin Hooks	7,131	48.21
Total votes		14,793	100.0

=== District 139 ===
Democratic primary
Party	Candidate	Votes	%
Democratic	Patty Bentley (incumbent)	2,559	100.0
Total votes		2,559	100.0

139th District general election
Party	Candidate	Votes	%
Democratic	Patty Bentley (incumbent)	11,713	100.0
Total votes		11,713	100.0
Democratic hold			

=== District 140 ===
Republican primary
Party	Candidate	Votes	%
Republican	Robert Dickey (incumbent)	2,966	100.0
Total votes		2,966	100.0

140th District general election
Party	Candidate	Votes	%
Republican	Robert Dickey (incumbent)	15,676	100.0
Total votes		15,676	100.0
Republican hold			

=== District 141 ===
Republican primary
Party	Candidate	Votes	%
Republican	Dale Washburn	2,408	34.03
Republican	Gary Bechtel	1,920	27.13
Republican	Todd Tolbert	1,577	22.29
Republican	Shane Mobley	1,171	16.55
Total votes		7,076	100.0

Republican primary runoff
Party	Candidate	Votes	%
Republican	Dale Washburn	4,196	59.76
Republican	Gary Bechtel	2,826	40.24
Total votes		7,022	100.0

141st District general election
Party	Candidate	Votes	%
Republican	Dale Washburn	21,109	100.0
Total votes		21,109	100.0
Republican hold			

=== District 142 ===
Democratic primary
Party	Candidate	Votes	%
Democratic	Miriam Paris (incumbent)	2,541	56.77
Democratic	Frank Austin	1,935	43.23
Total votes		4,476	100.0

142nd District general election
Party	Candidate	Votes	%
Democratic	Miriam Paris (incumbent)	15,148	100.0
Total votes		15,148	100.0
Democratic hold			

=== District 143 ===
Democratic primary
Party	Candidate	Votes	%
Democratic	James Beverly (incumbent)	3,409	75.96
Democratic	Phyllis T. Hightower	1,079	24.04
Total votes		4,488	100.0

143rd District general election
Party	Candidate	Votes	%
Democratic	James Beverly (incumbent)	14,873	100.0
Total votes		14,873	100.0
Democratic hold			

=== District 144 ===
Republican primary
Party	Candidate	Votes	%
Republican	Danny Mathis	2,863	63.61
Republican	Trey Ennis	1,395	30.99
Republican	Milton Sampson	243	5.40
Total votes		4,501	100.0

Democratic primary
Party	Candidate	Votes	%
Democratic	Jessica Walden	1,094	33.98
Democratic	Gregory D. Odoms	920	28.57
Democratic	Mary Whipple-Lue	893	27.73
Democratic	Cheyenne Warnock	313	9.72
Total votes		3,220	100.0

Democratic primary runoff
Party	Candidate	Votes	%
Democratic	Jessica Walden	924	52.53
Democratic	Gregory D. Odoms	835	47.47
Total votes		1,759	100.0

144th District general election
Party	Candidate	Votes	%
Republican	Danny Mathis	14,825	65.38
Democratic	Jessica Walden	7,850	34.62
Total votes		22,675	100.0

=== District 145 ===
Republican primary
Party	Candidate	Votes	%
Republican	Ricky A. Williams (incumbent)	2,672	100.0
Total votes		2,672	100.0

145th District general election
Party	Candidate	Votes	%
Republican	Ricky A. Williams (incumbent)	12,821	100.0
Total votes		12,821	100.0
Republican hold			

=== District 146 ===
Republican primary
Party	Candidate	Votes	%
Republican	Shaw Blackmon (incumbent)	3,185	100.0
Total votes		3,185	100.0

146th District general election
Party	Candidate	Votes	%
Republican	Shaw Blackmon (incumbent)	20,375	100.0
Total votes		20,375	100.0
Republican hold			

=== District 147 ===
Republican primary
Party	Candidate	Votes	%
Republican	Heath Clark (incumbent)	1,994	100.0
Total votes		1,994	100.0

Democratic primary
Party	Candidate	Votes	%
Democratic	Fenika Miller	1,710	100.0
Total votes		1,710	100.0

147th District general election
Party	Candidate	Votes	%
Republican	Heath Clark (incumbent)	9,787	54.15
Democratic	Fenika Miller	8,288	45.85
Total votes		18,075	100.0

=== District 148 ===
Democratic primary
Party	Candidate	Votes	%
Democratic	Joshua Deriso	1,298	100.0
Total votes		1,298	100.0

Republican primary
Party	Candidate	Votes	%
Republican	Noel Williams, Jr.	2,840	100.0
Total votes		2,840	100.0

148th District general election
Party	Candidate	Votes	%
Democratic	Joshua Deriso	5,567	30.55
Republican	Noel Williams, Jr.	12,657	69.45
Total votes		18,224	100.0

=== District 149 ===
Republican primary
Party	Candidate	Votes	%
Republican	Jimmy Pruett (incumbent)	2,288	100.0
Total votes		2,288	100.0

149th District general election
Party	Candidate	Votes	%
Republican	Jimmy Pruett (incumbent)	11,904	100.0
Total votes		11,904	100.0
Republican hold			

=== District 150 ===
Republican primary
Party	Candidate	Votes	%
Republican	Matt Hatchett (incumbent)	3,688	100.0
Total votes		3,688	100.0

150th District general election
Party	Candidate	Votes	%
Republican	Matt Hatchett (incumbent)	16,319	100.0
Total votes		16,319	100.0
Republican hold			

=== District 151 ===
Democratic primary
Party	Candidate	Votes	%
Democratic	Joyce Barlow	3,156	100.0
Total votes		3,156	100.0

Republican primary
Party	Candidate	Votes	%
Republican	Gerald Greene (incumbent)	2,726	100.0
Total votes		2,726	100.0

151st District general election
Party	Candidate	Votes	%
Democratic	Joyce Barlow	9,257	46.47
Republican	Gerald Greene (incumbent)	10,664	53.53
Total votes		19,921	100.0

=== District 152 ===
Democratic primary
Party	Candidate	Votes	%
Democratic	Marcus Batten	971	57.87
Democratic	Mary Egler	707	42.13
Total votes		1,678	100.0

Republican primary
Party	Candidate	Votes	%
Republican	Ed Rynders (incumbent)	4,268	100.0
Total votes		4,268	100.0

152nd District general election
Party	Candidate	Votes	%
Democratic	Marcus Batten	5,813	25.96
Republican	Ed Rynders (incumbent)	16,580	74.04
Total votes		22,393	100.0

=== District 153 ===
Republican primary
Party	Candidate	Votes	%
Republican	Tracy Taylor	1,253	100.0
Total votes		1,253	100.0

Democratic primary
Party	Candidate	Votes	%
Democratic	Camia Whitaker Hopson	1,931	51.27
Democratic	Darrel Ealum (incumbent)	1,835	48.73
Total votes		3,766	100.0

153rd District general election
Party	Candidate	Votes	%
Republican	Tracy Taylor	5,543	34.53
Democratic	Camia Whitaker Hopson	10,512	65.47
Total votes		16,055	100.0

=== District 154 ===
Democratic primary
Party	Candidate	Votes	%
Democratic	Winfred Dukes (incumbent)	4,235	100.0
Total votes		4,235	100.0

154th District general election
Party	Candidate	Votes	%
Democratic	Winfred Dukes (incumbent)	14,850	100.0
Total votes		14,850	100.0
Democratic hold			

=== District 155 ===
Republican primary
Party	Candidate	Votes	%
Republican	Clay Pirkle (incumbent)	3,461	100.0
Total votes		3,461	100.0

155th District general election
Party	Candidate	Votes	%
Republican	Clay Pirkle (incumbent)	15,946	100.0
Total votes		15,946	100.0
Republican hold			

=== District 156 ===
Republican primary
Party	Candidate	Votes	%
Republican	Greg Morris (incumbent)	3,576	70.52
Republican	Lee Burton	1,495	29.48
Total votes		5,071	100.0

156th District general election
Party	Candidate	Votes	%
Republican	Greg Morris (incumbent)	15,430	100.0
Total votes		15,430	100.0
Republican hold			

=== District 157 ===
Republican primary
Party	Candidate	Votes	%
Republican	William "Bill" Werkheiser (incumbent)	2,557	62.40
Republican	Delvis Dutton	1,541	37.60
Total votes		4,098	100.0

157th District general election
Party	Candidate	Votes	%
Republican	William "Bill" Werkheiser (incumbent)	12,871	100.0
Total votes		12,871	100.0
Republican hold			

=== District 158 ===
Republican primary
Party	Candidate	Votes	%
Republican	Butch Parrish (incumbent)	3,128	100.0
Total votes		3,128	100.0

158th District general election
Party	Candidate	Votes	%
Republican	Butch Parrish (incumbent)	14,685	100.0
Total votes		14,685	100.0
Republican hold			

=== District 159 ===
Republican primary
Party	Candidate	Votes	%
Republican	Jon G. Burns (incumbent)	3,276	100.0
Total votes		3,276	100.0

159th District general election
Party	Candidate	Votes	%
Republican	Jon G. Burns (incumbent)	16,917	100.0
Total votes		16,917	100.0
Republican hold			

=== District 160 ===
Republican primary
Party	Candidate	Votes	%
Republican	Jan Tankersley (incumbent)	2,561	76.95
Republican	Robert Busbee	767	23.05
Total votes		3,328	100.0

160th District general election
Party	Candidate	Votes	%
Republican	Jan Tankersley (incumbent)	14,372	100.0
Total votes		14,372	100.0
Republican hold			

=== District 161 ===
Democratic primary
Party	Candidate	Votes	%
Democratic	Adam Bridges	1,869	100.0
Total votes		1,869	100.0

Republican primary
Party	Candidate	Votes	%
Republican	Bill Hitchens (incumbent)	2,824	100.0
Total votes		2,824	100.0

161st District general election
Party	Candidate	Votes	%
Democratic	Adam Bridges	8,973	36.55
Republican	Bill Hitchens (incumbent)	15,574	63.45
Total votes		24,547	100.0

=== District 162 ===
Democratic primary
Party	Candidate	Votes	%
Democratic	Carl Wayne Gilliard (incumbent)	3,092	100.0
Total votes		3,092	100.0

162nd District general election
Party	Candidate	Votes	%
Democratic	Carl Wayne Gilliard (incumbent)	13,372	100.0
Total votes		13,372	100.0
Democratic hold			

=== District 163 ===
Democratic primary
Party	Candidate	Votes	%
Democratic	J. Craig Gordon (incumbent)	3,703	100.0
Total votes		3,703	100.0

163rd District general election
Party	Candidate	Votes	%
Democratic	J. Craig Gordon (incumbent)	14,959	100.0
Total votes		14,959	100.0
Democratic hold			

=== District 164 ===
Democratic primary
Party	Candidate	Votes	%
Democratic	Alicia "Aer" Scott	1,885	100.0
Total votes		1,885	100.0

Republican primary
Party	Candidate	Votes	%
Republican	Ron Stephens (incumbent)	1,722	100.0
Total votes		1,722	100.0

164th District general election
Party	Candidate	Votes	%
Democratic	Alicia "Aer" Scott	8,420	47.54
Republican	Ron Stephens (incumbent)	9,291	52.46
Total votes		17,711	100.0

=== District 165 ===
Democratic primary
Party	Candidate	Votes	%
Democratic	Mickey Stephens (incumbent)	3,782	100.0
Total votes		3,782	100.0

165th District general election
Party	Candidate	Votes	%
Democratic	Mickey Stephens (incumbent)	16,361	100.0
Total votes		16,361	100.0
Democratic hold			

=== District 166 ===
Republican primary
Party	Candidate	Votes	%
Republican	Jesse Petrea (incumbent)	4,741	100.0
Total votes		4,741	100.0

166th District general election
Party	Candidate	Votes	%
Republican	Jesse Petrea (incumbent)	24,256	100.0
Total votes		24,256	100.0
Republican hold			

=== District 167 ===
Republican primary
Party	Candidate	Votes	%
Republican	Jeff Jones (incumbent)	3,370	100.0
Total votes		3,370	100.0

Democratic primary
Party	Candidate	Votes	%
Democratic	Cedric Z. King	1,815	100.0
Total votes		1,815	100.0

167th District general election
Party	Candidate	Votes	%
Republican	Jeff Jones (incumbent)	13,591	67.88
Democratic	Cedric Z. King	6,431	32.12
Total votes		20,022	100.0

=== District 168 ===
Democratic primary
Party	Candidate	Votes	%
Democratic	Al Williams (incumbent)	3,134	100.0
Total votes		3,134	100.0

168th District general election
Party	Candidate	Votes	%
Democratic	Al Williams (incumbent)	11,947	100.0
Total votes		11,947	100.0
Democratic hold			

=== District 169 ===
Republican primary
Party	Candidate	Votes	%
Republican	Dominic LaRiccia (incumbent)	2,191	100.0
Total votes		2,191	100.0

169th District general election
Party	Candidate	Votes	%
Republican	Dominic LaRiccia (incumbent)	12,937	100.0
Total votes		12,937	100.0
Republican hold			

=== District 170 ===
Republican primary
Party	Candidate	Votes	%
Republican	Penny Houston (incumbent)	3,397	100.0
Total votes		3,397	100.0

170th District general election
Party	Candidate	Votes	%
Republican	Penny Houston (incumbent)	14,668	100.0
Total votes		14,668	100.0
Republican hold			

=== District 171 ===
Republican primary
Party	Candidate	Votes	%
Republican	Jay Powell (incumbent)	2,495	100.0
Total votes		2,495	100.0

171st District general election
Party	Candidate	Votes	%
Republican	Jay Powell (incumbent)	13,765	100.0
Total votes		13,765	100.0
Republican hold			

=== District 172 ===
Republican primary
Party	Candidate	Votes	%
Republican	Sam Watson (incumbent)	2,744	100.0
Total votes		2,744	100.0

172nd District general election
Party	Candidate	Votes	%
Republican	Sam Watson (incumbent)	12,046	100.0
Total votes		12,046	100.0
Republican hold			

=== District 173 ===
Republican primary
Party	Candidate	Votes	%
Republican	Darlene Taylor (incumbent)	2,160	100.0
Total votes		2,160	100.0

Democratic primary
Party	Candidate	Votes	%
Democratic	Twitty Titus	1,552	100.0
Total votes		1,552	100.0

173rd District general election
Party	Candidate	Votes	%
Republican	Darlene Taylor (incumbent)	11,599	61.02
Democratic	Twitty Titus	7,409	38.98
Total votes			100.0

=== District 174 ===
Republican primary
Party	Candidate	Votes	%
Republican	John Corbett (incumbent)	2,439	100.0
Total votes		2,439	100.0

174th District general election
Party	Candidate	Votes	%
Republican	John Corbett (incumbent)	13,773	100.0
Total votes		13,773	100.0
Republican hold			

=== District 175 ===
Democratic primary
Party	Candidate	Votes	%
Democratic	Treva Gear	1,393	100.0
Total votes		1,393	100.0

Republican primary
Party	Candidate	Votes	%
Republican	John LaHood (incumbent)	3,826	85.00
Republican	Coy Reaves	675	15.00
Total votes		4,501	100.0

175th District general election
Party	Candidate	Votes	%
Democratic	Treva Gear	6,230	28.49
Republican	John LaHood (incumbent)	15,638	71.51
Total votes		21,868	100.0

=== District 176 ===
Republican primary
Party	Candidate	Votes	%
Republican	Jason Shaw (incumbent)	2,994	100.0
Total votes		2,994	100.0

176th District general election
Party	Candidate	Votes	%
Republican	Jason Shaw (incumbent)	13,817	100.0
Total votes		13,817	100.0
Republican hold			

=== District 177 ===
Democratic primary
Party	Candidate	Votes	%
Democratic	Dexter L. Sharper (incumbent)	1,603	100.0
Total votes		1,603	100.0

177th District general election
Party	Candidate	Votes	%
Democratic	Dexter L. Sharper (incumbent)	10,889	100.0
Total votes		10,889	100.0
Democratic hold			

=== District 178 ===
Republican primary
Party	Candidate	Votes	%
Republican	Steven Meeks	3,865	63.05
Republican	Franklin Rozier	2,265	36.95
Total votes		6,130	100.0

Democratic primary
Party	Candidate	Votes	%
Democratic	Greg O'Driscoll	457	100.0
Total votes		457	100.0

178th District general election
Party	Candidate	Votes	%
Republican	Steven Meeks	16,451	89.43
Democratic	Greg O'Driscoll	1,945	10.57
Total votes		18,396	100.0

=== District 179 ===
Republican primary
Party	Candidate	Votes	%
Republican	Don Hogan (incumbent)	3,596	100.0
Total votes		3,596	100.0

Democratic primary
Party	Candidate	Votes	%
Democratic	Julie Jordan	1,982	100.0
Total votes		1,982	100.0

179th District general election
Party	Candidate	Votes	%
Republican	Don Hogan (incumbent)	12,337	57.76
Democratic	Julie Jordan	9,023	42.24
Total votes		21,360	100.0

=== District 180 ===
Republican primary
Party	Candidate	Votes	%
Republican	Steven Sainz	2,463	57.80
Republican	Jason Spencer (incumbent)	1,798	42.20
Total votes		4,261	100.0

180th District general election
Party	Candidate	Votes	%
Republican	Steven Sainz	14,530	100.0
Total votes		14,530	100.0
Republican hold			

== See also ==
- United States elections, 2018
- United States House of Representatives elections in Georgia, 2018
- Georgia elections, 2018
- Georgia gubernatorial election, 2018
- Georgia lieutenant gubernatorial election, 2018
- Georgia Secretary of State election, 2018
- Georgia State Senate election, 2018
- Elections in Georgia (U.S. state)
- List of Georgia state legislatures
