= 2016 Georgia House of Representatives election =

- November 8, 2016

All 180 seats in the Georgia House of Representatives 91 seats needed for a majority
- Turnout: 64.06% ▲22.09 pp
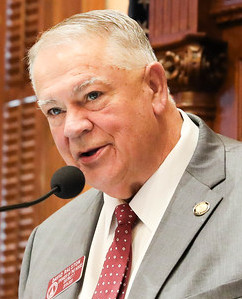

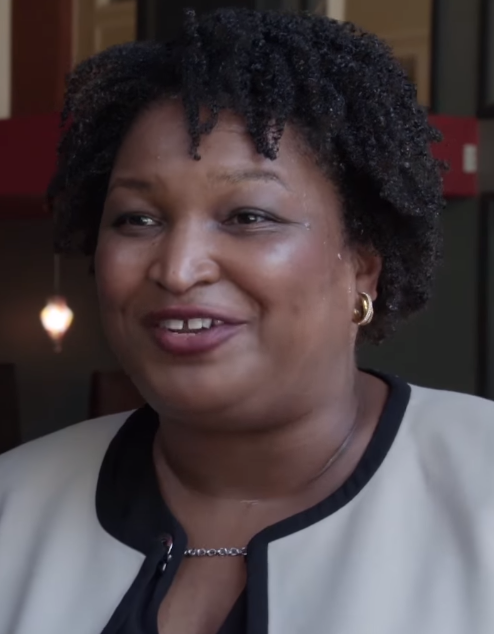
	Majority party	Minority party
Leader	David Ralston	Stacey Abrams
Party	Republican	Democratic
Leader since	January 11, 2010	January 10, 2011
Leader's seat	7th	89th
Last election	120	59
Seats before	118	61
Seats after	118	62
Seat change	Steady	▲1
Popular vote	2,236,549	1,239,831
Percentage	64.21%	35.56%
- Results: Democratic hold Democratic gain Republican hold Republican gain
Speaker before election
David Ralston
Republican
Elected Speaker
David Ralston
Republican

The 2016 Georgia House of Representatives elections took place on November 8, 2016, as part of the biennial United States elections. Georgia voters elected state representatives in all 180 of the state house's districts. State representatives serve two-year terms in the Georgia House of Representatives. The primary elections took place on May 24, 2016.

== Predictions ==
Source	Ranking	As of
Governing	Safe R	May 18, 2016

== Results ==
Popular vote
Republican	64.21%
Democratic	35.56%
Other	0.23%

House seats
Republican	64.33%
Democratic	35.67%

== Summary of results by district ==
2016 election results:

District	Democratic		Republican		Others		Total	Result
District	Votes	%	Votes	%	Votes	%	Votes	Result
District 2	-	-	17,938	100.00%	-	-	17,938	Republican hold
District 3	-	-	19,071	100.00%	-	-	19,071	Republican hold
District 4	-	-	11,335	100.00%	-	-	11,335	Republican hold
District 5	-	-	14,813	100.00%	-	-	14,813	Republican hold
District 6	-	-	14,654	100.00%	-	-	14,654	Republican hold
District 7	-	-	21,666	100.00%	-	-	21,666	Republican hold
District 8	-	-	24,824	100.00%	-	-	24,824	Republican hold
District 9	-	-	21,293	100.00%	-	-	21,293	Republican hold
District 10	-	-	18,168	100.00%	-	-	18,168	Republican hold
District 11	3,313	15.54%	18,000	84.46%	-	-	21,313	Republican hold
District 12	-	-	15,880	100.00%	-	-	15,880	Republican hold
District 13	-	-	14,476	100.00%	-	-	14,476	Republican hold
District 14	-	-	18,677	100.00%	-	-	18,677	Republican hold
District 15	4,849	24.21%	15,182	75.79%	-	-	20,031	Republican hold
District 16	-	-	17,296	100.00%	-	-	17,296	Republican hold
District 17	-	-	20,415	100.00%	-	-	20,415	Republican hold
District 18	-	-	16,474	100.00%	-	-	16,474	Republican hold
District 19	-	-	19,802	100.00%	-	-	19,802	Republican hold
District 20	-	-	23,543	100.00%	-	-	23,543	Republican hold
District 21	-	-	23,967	100.00%	-	-	23,967	Republican hold
District 22	5,216	16.82%	25,794	83.18%	-	-	31,010	Republican hold
District 23	-	-	20,944	100.00%	-	-	20,944	Republican hold
District 24	-	-	25,996	100.00%	-	-	25,996	Republican hold
District 25	-	-	26,162	100.00%	-	-	26,162	Republican hold
District 26	-	-	26,386	100.00%	-	-	26,386	Republican hold
District 27	-	-	19,469	100.00%	-	-	19,469	Republican hold
District 28	-	-	17,925	100.00%	-	-	17,925	Republican hold
District 29	-	-	12,733	100.00%	-	-	12,733	Republican hold
District 30	5,302	25.97%	15,115	74.03%	-	-	19,716	Republican hold
District 31	-	-	21,810	100.00%	-	-	21,810	Republican hold
District 32	-	-	18,783	100.00%	-	-	18,783	Republican hold
District 33	-	-	19,190	100.00%	-	-	19,190	Republican hold
District 34	9,050	36.29%	15,886	63.71%	-	-	24,936	Republican hold
District 35	-	-	18,901	100.00%	-	-	18,901	Republican hold
District 36	-	-	26,807	100.00%	-	-	26,807	Republican hold
District 37	10,567	43.07%	13,965	56.93%	-	-	24,532	Republican hold
District 38	19,547	100.00%	-	-	-	-	19,547	Democratic hold
District 39	18,097	100.00%	-	-	-	-	18,097	Democratic hold
District 40	13,781	46.49%	15,863	53.51%	-	-	29,644	Republican hold
District 41	13,843	100.00%	-	-	-	-	13,843	Democratic hold
District 42	11,384	73.25%	4,157	26.75%	-	-	15,541	Democratic hold
District 43	-	-	20,889	100.00%	-	-	20,889	Republican hold
District 44	-	-	21,759	100.00%	-	-	21,759	Republican hold
District 45	-	-	24,907	100.00%	-	-	24,907	Republican hold
District 46	-	-	24,736	100.00%	-	-	24,736	Republican hold
District 47	-	-	23,622	100.00%	-	-	23,622	Republican hold
District 48	-	-	17,886	100.00%	-	-	17,886	Republican hold
District 49	-	-	20,599	100.00%	-	-	20,599	Republican hold
District 50	-	-	17,802	100.00%	-	-	17,802	Republican hold
District 51	-	-	19,210	100.00%	-	-	19,210	Republican hold
District 52	-	-	21,263	100.00%	-	-	21,263	Republican hold
District 53	20,617	100.00%	-	-	-	-	20,617	Democratic hold
District 54	11,472	39.43%	17,620	60.57%	-	-	29,092	Republican hold
District 55	23,111	100.00%	-	-	-	-	23,111	Democratic hold
District 56	16,683	100.00%	-	-	-	-	16,683	Democratic hold
District 57	23,832	100.00%	-	-	-	-	23,832	Democratic hold
District 58	23,287	100.00%	-	-	-	-	23,287	Democratic hold
District 59	20,276	100.00%	-	-	-	-	20,276	Democratic hold
District 60	15,824	91.64%	1,443	8.36%	-	-	17,267	Democratic hold
District 61	20,473	100.00%	-	-	-	-	20,473	Democratic hold
District 62	23,562	100.00%	-	-	-	-	23,562	Democratic hold
District 63	21,252	100.00%	-	-	-	-	21,252	Democratic hold
District 64	21,251	100.00%	-	-	-	-	21,251	Democratic hold
District 65	19,109	82.02%	4,190	17.98%	-	-	23,299	Democratic hold
District 66	14,030	58.74%	9,855	41.26%	-	-	23,885	Democratic hold
District 67	-	-	19,037	100.00%	-	-	19,037	Republican hold
District 68	-	-	19,500	100.00%	-	-	19,500	Republican hold
District 69	-	-	19,212	100.00%	-	-	19,212	Republican hold
District 70	-	-	20,682	100.00%	-	-	20,682	Republican hold
District 71	6,933	25.40%	20,361	74.60%	-	-	27,294	Republican hold
District 72	-	-	26,801	100.00%	-	-	26,801	Republican hold
District 73	8,610	35.47%	15,661	64.53%	-	-	24,271	Republican hold
District 74	14,995	100.00%	-	-	-	-	14,995	Democratic hold
District 75	18,063	100.00%	-	-	-	-	18,063	Democratic hold
District 76	19,734	100.00%	-	-	-	-	19,734	Democratic hold
District 77	15,848	100.00%	-	-	-	-	15,848	Democratic hold
District 78	19,294	100.00%	-	-	-	-	19,294	Democratic hold
District 79	-	-	18,108	100.00%	-	-	18,108	Republican hold
District 80	12,100	49.42%	12,386	50.58%	-	-	24,486	Republican gain
District 81	9,921	58.94%	6,912	41.06%	-	-	16,833	Democratic hold
District 82	18,185	100.00%	-	-	-	-	18,185	Democratic hold
District 83	24,122	100.00%	-	-	-	-	24,122	Democratic hold
District 84	25,287	100.00%	-	-	-	-	25,287	Democratic hold
District 85	17,927	100.00%	-	-	-	-	17,927	Democratic hold
District 86	19,124	100.00%	-	-	-	-	19,124	Democratic hold
District 87	21,595	100.00%	-	-	-	-	21,595	Democratic hold
District 88	19,003	100.00%	-	-	-	-	19,003	Democratic hold
District 89	26,039	100.00%	-	-	-	-	26,039	Democratic hold
District 90	22,924	100.00%	-	-	-	-	22,924	Democratic hold
District 91	18,161	72.26%	6,973	27.74%	-	-	25,134	Democratic hold
District 92	16,486	100.00%	-	-	-	-	16,486	Democratic hold
District 93	22,741	100.00%	-	-	-	-	22,741	Democratic hold
District 94	21,399	100.00%	-	-	-	-	21,399	Democratic hold
District 95	-	-	18,293	100.00%	-	-	18,293	Republican hold
District 96	8,626	62.03%	5,291	37.97%	-	-	13,907	Democratic hold
District 97	-	-	20,171	100.00%	-	-	20,171	Republican hold
District 98	-	-	19,473	100.00%	-	-	19,473	Republican hold
District 99	8,068	100.00%	-	-	-	-	8,068	Democratic hold
District 100	11,180	100.00%	-	-	-	-	11,180	Democratic hold
District 101	10,671	51.10%	10,211	48.90%	-	-	20,882	Democratic gain
District 102	9,567	44.11%	12,124	55.89%	-	-	21,691	Republican hold
District 103	-	-	23,755	100.00%	-	-	23,755	Republican hold
District 104	-	-	19,776	100.00%	-	-	19,776	Republican hold
District 105	12,189	49.55%	12,411	50.45%	-	-	24,600	Republican hold
District 106	-	-	17,835	100.00%	-	-	17,835	Republican hold
District 107	-	-	15,861	100.00%	-	-	15,861	Republican hold
District 108	10,524	47.35%	11,704	52.65%	-	-	22,228	Republican hold
District 109	11,389	42.34%	15,507	57.66%	-	-	26,896	Republican hold
District 110	-	-	18,003	100.00%	-	-	18,003	Republican hold
District 111	13,542	48.31%	14,488	51.69%	-	-	28,030	Republican hold
District 112	-	-	21,718	100.00%	-	-	21,718	Republican hold
District 113	18,834	100.00%	-	-	-	-	18,834	Democratic hold
District 114	-	-	22,186	100.00%	-	-	22,186	Republican hold
District 115	-	-	20,644	100.00%	-	-	20,644	Republican hold
District 116	-	-	19,144	100.00%	-	-	19,144	Republican hold
District 117	-	-	18,374	100.00%	-	-	18,374	Republican hold
District 118	16,223	100.00%	-	-	-	-	16,223	Democratic hold
District 119	-	-	16,223	100.00%	-	-	16,223	Republican hold
District 120	-	-	20,350	100.00%	-	-	20,350	Republican hold
District 121	-	-	20,582	100.00%	-	-	20,582	Republican hold
District 122	-	-	26,914	100.00%	-	-	26,914	Republican hold
District 123	-	-	21,916	100.00%	-	-	21,916	Republican hold
District 124	14,751	100.00%	-	-	-	-	14,751	Democratic hold
District 125	15,120	100.00%	-	-	-	-	15,120	Democratic hold
District 126	19,051	100.00%	-	-	-	-	19,051	Democratic hold
District 127	15,251	100.00%	-	-	-	-	15,251	Democratic hold
District 128	15,747	100.00%	-	-	-	-	15,747	Democratic hold
District 129	-	-	18,206	100.00%	-	-	18,206	Republican hold
District 130	-	-	16,655	100.00%	-	-	16,655	Republican hold
District 131	-		18,712	100.00%	-	-	18,712	Republican hold
District 132	9,750	53.71%	8,402	46.29%	-	-	18,152	Democratic hold
District 133	-	-	21,688	100.00%	-	-	21,688	Republican hold
District 134	-	-	19,445	100.00%	-	-	19,445	Republican hold
District 135	10,991	100.00%	-	-	-	-	10,991	Democratic hold
District 136	16,662	100.00%	-	-	-	-	16,662	Democratic hold
District 137	19,076	100.00%	-	-	-	-	19,076	Democratic hold
District 138	7,917	50.82%	7,661	49.18%	-	-	15,578	Democratic gain
District 139	12,880	100.00%	-	-	-	-	12,880	Democratic hold
District 140	-	-	16,361	100.00%	-	-	16,361	Republican hold
District 141	-	-	22,703	100.00%	-	-	22,703	Republican hold
District 142	16,124	100.00%	-	-	-	-	16,124	Democratic hold
District 143	15,528	100.00%	-	-	-	-	15,528	Democratic hold
District 144	7,305	32.33%	15,288	67.67%	-	-	22,593	Republican hold
District 145	8,316	43.43%	10,834	56.57%	-	-	19,150	Republican hold
District 146	-	-	21,346	100.00%	-	-	21,346	Republican hold
District 147	-	-	14,923	100.00%	-	-	14,923	Republican hold
District 148	-	-	15,059	100.00%	-	-	15,059	Republican hold
District 149	-	-	11,622	100.00%	-	-	11,622	Republican hold
District 150	-	-	17,084	100.00%	-	-	17,084	Republican hold
District 151	-	-	12,675	62.13%	7,726	37.87%	20,401	Republican hold
District 152	-	-	20,251	100.00%	-	-	20,251	Republican hold
District 153	14,841	100.00%	-	-	-	-	14,841	Democratic hold
District 154	17,073	100.00%	-	-	-	-	17,073	Democratic hold
District 155	-	-	16,499	100.00%	-	-	16,499	Republican hold
District 156	-	-	15,485	100.00%	-	-	15,485	Republican hold
District 157	-	-	13,009	100.00%	-	-	13,009	Republican hold
District 158	-	-	15,425	100.00%	-	-	15,425	Republican hold
District 159	-	-	17,513	100.00%	-	-	17,513	Republican hold
District 160	5,292	29.24%	12,807	70.76%	-	-	18,099	Republican hold
District 161	-	-	20,835	100.00%	-	-	20,835	Republican hold
District 162	15,092	100.00%	-	-	-	-	15,092	Democratic hold
District 163	15,649	100.00%	-	-	-	-	15,649	Democratic hold
District 164	-	-	14,973	100.00%	-	-	14,973	Republican hold
District 165	18,197	100.00%	-	-	-	-	18,197	Democratic hold
District 166	-	-	26,255	100.00%	-	-	26,255	Republican hold
District 167	-	-	16,871	100.00%	-	-	16,871	Republican hold
District 168	12,939	100.00%	-	-	-	-	12,939	Democratic hold
District 169	-	-	13,521	100.00%	-	-	13,521	Republican hold
District 170	-	-	15,558	100.00%	-	-	15,558	Republican hold
District 171	-	-	14,662	100.00%	-	-	14,662	Republican hold
District 172	-	-	12,898	100.00%	-	-	12,898	Republican hold
District 173	8,021	38.94%	12,578	61.06%	-	-	20,599	Republican hold
District 174	-	-	15,128	100.00%	-	-	15,128	Republican hold
District 175	-	-	19,531	100.00%	-	-	19,531	Republican hold
District 176	-	-	14,891	100.00%	-	-	14,891	Republican hold
District 177	9,226	64.38%	5,104	35.62%	-	-	14,330	Democratic hold
District 178	-	-	17,354	100.00%	-	-	17,354	Republican hold
District 179	-	-	17,055	100.00%	-	-	17,055	Republican hold
District 180	-	-	16,168	100.00%	-	-	16,168	Republican hold

== Detailed results by district ==
District 1 • District 2 • District 3 • District 4 • District 5 • District 6 • District 7 • District 8 • District 9 • District 10 • District 11 • District 12 • District 13 • District 14 • District 15 • District 16 • District 17 • District 18 • District 19 • District 20 • District 21 • District 22 • District 23 • District 24 • District 25 • District 26 • District 27 • District 28 • District 29 • District 30 • District 31 • District 32 • District 33 • District 34 • District 35 • District 36 • District 37 • District 38 • District 39 • District 40 • District 41 • District 42 • District 43 • District 44 • District 45 • District 46 • District 47 • District 48 • District 49 • District 50 • District 51 • District 52 • District 53 • District 54 • District 55 • District 56 • District 57 • District 58 • District 59 • District 60 • District 61 • District 62 • District 63 • District 64 • District 65 • District 66 • District 67 • District 68 • District 69 • District 70 • District 71 • District 72 • District 73 • District 74 • District 75 • District 76 • District 77 • District 78 • District 79 • District 80 • District 81 • District 82 • District 83 • District 84 • District 85 • District 86 • District 87 • District 88 • District 89 • District 90 • District 91 • District 92 • District 93 • District 94 • District 95 • District 96 • District 97 • District 98 • District 99 • District 100 • District 101 • District 102 • District 103 • District 104 • District 105 • District 106 • District 107 • District 108 • District 109 • District 110 • District 111 • District 112 • District 113 • District 114 • District 115 • District 116 • District 117 • District 118 • District 119 • District 120 • District 121 • District 122 • District 123 • District 124 • District 125 • District 126 • District 127 • District 128 • District 129 • District 130 • District 131 • District 132 • District 133 • District 134 • District 135 • District 136 • District 137 • District 138 • District 139 • District 140 • District 141 • District 142 • District 143 • District 144 • District 145 • District 146 • District 147 • District 148 • District 149 • District 150 • District 151 • District 152 • District 153 • District 154 • District 155 • District 156 • District 157 • District 158 • District 159 • District 160 • District 161 • District 162 • District 163 • District 164 • District 165 • District 166 • District 167 • District 168 • District 169 • District 170 • District 171 • District 172 • District 173 • District 174 • District 175 • District 176 • District 177 • District 178 • District 179 • District 180

== See also ==
- List of Georgia state legislatures
