= Deborah Silcox =

American politician

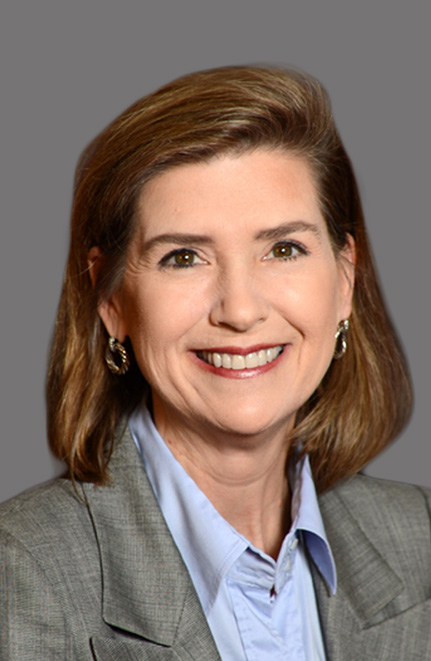
- Official portrait, 2025

Member of the Georgia House of Representatives from the 53rd district
- Incumbent
- Assumed office January 9, 2023
- Preceded by: District established

Member of the Georgia House of Representatives for the 52nd district
- In office January 9, 2017 – January 11, 2021
- Preceded by: Joe Wilkinson
- Succeeded by: Shea Roberts

Personal details
- Born: Sandy Springs, Georgia, U.S.
- Party: Republican
- Spouse: Hal Silcox III
- Children: 2
- Education: University of Georgia (BA); Emory University School of Law (JD)
- Occupation: Attorney

Deborah Donaldson Silcox is an American politician. She has served as a Republican member of the Georgia House of Representatives from District 53 since 2023. She previously represented the 52nd district which encompassed parts of Buckhead and Sandy Springs from 2017 to 2021. She lost her re-election bid during the 2020 general election.

== Personal life ==
Silcox was born in Sandy Springs, Georgia. She graduated from Riverwood High School and went on to receive a Bachelor of Arts degree in political science and French from the University of Georgia and a J.D. degree from Emory University School of Law. She practiced law for ten years but gave up her partnership to raise her family. She has been married for over thirty years and has two children. Her husband, Hal Silcox III, is an orthopedic surgeon.

In 2005, she was appointed by Governor Sonny Perdue to serve on both the Department of Human Resources Board and Governor's Commission for Volunteerism and Service. She was then chosen by Governor Nathan Deal to be the chairman of the Governor's Commission for Volunteerism and Service.

== Political career ==
Silcox ran in 2016 for the Georgia House of Representatives District 52 when incumbent Joe Wilkinson decided to not seek re-election. In the Republican primary, she defeated Graham Harris, and she then ran unopposed in the general election.

Silcox ran again in 2018 and won the Republican primary. She then faced Shea Roberts in the general election and won with 52.3 percent of the vote. During the 2019 Legislative Session, she was appointed chairman of the House MARTOC Committee, which oversees MARTA.

Silcox ran unopposed in the Republic primary for the 2020 election. She was defeated in the general election by Shea Roberts by less than four hundred votes. Silcox never officially conceded the race.

In the 2022 Georgia House of Representatives election, she was elected in District 53.

== Awards ==
- 2017 Legislator of the Year. Named by the Georgia Ophthalmology Society.
- 2018 Champion of Georgia's Cities. Named by the Georgia Municipal Association.

Georgia House of Representatives
Preceded by Joe Wilkinson	Member of the Georgia House of Representatives from the 52nd district 2017–2021	Succeeded by Shea Roberts
Preceded by Sheila Jones	Member of the Georgia House of Representatives from the 53rd district 2023–Present	Incumbent
