= Joe Wilkinson (politician) =

American politician

Member of the Georgia House of Representatives from the 52nd district
- In office 2001–2017
- Succeeded by: Deborah Silcox

Personal details
- Born: September 3, 1946 (age 79) Atlanta, Georgia, U.S.
- Party: Republican

Joe Wilkinson (born September 3, 1946) is an American politician. He is a member of the Georgia House of Representatives from the 52nd District, from 2001 to 2017. He is a member of the Republican Party.
