= Shea Roberts =

American politician

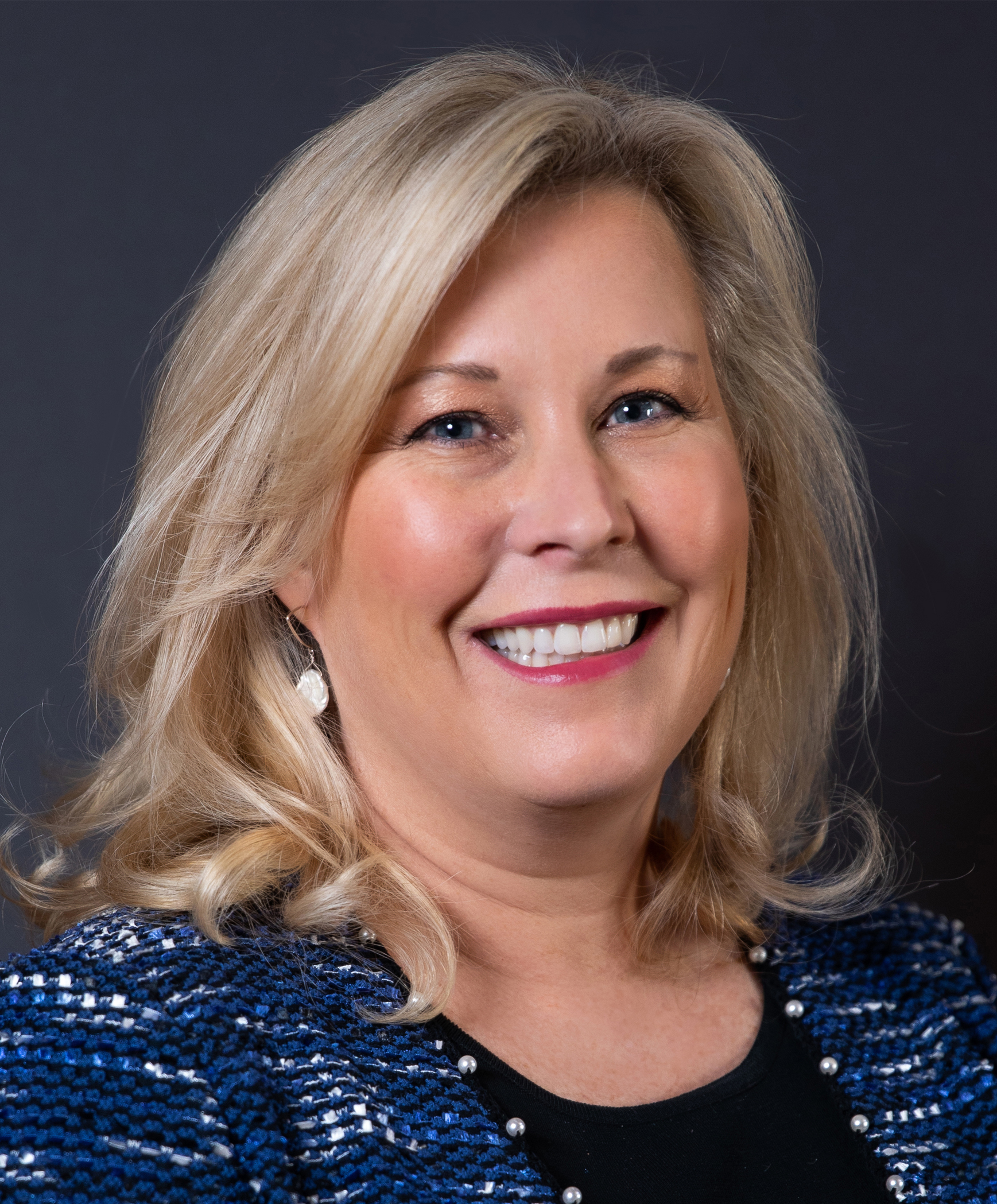
- Official portrait, 2021

Member of the Georgia House of Representatives from the 52nd district
- Incumbent
- Assumed office January 11, 2021
- Preceded by: Deborah Silcox

Personal details
- Born: July 24, 1970 (age 56)
- Party: Democratic

Shea Evans Roberts (born July 24, 1970) is an American politician from Georgia. Roberts is a Democratic member of Georgia House of Representatives for District 52.
