= Sheila Jones =

American politician

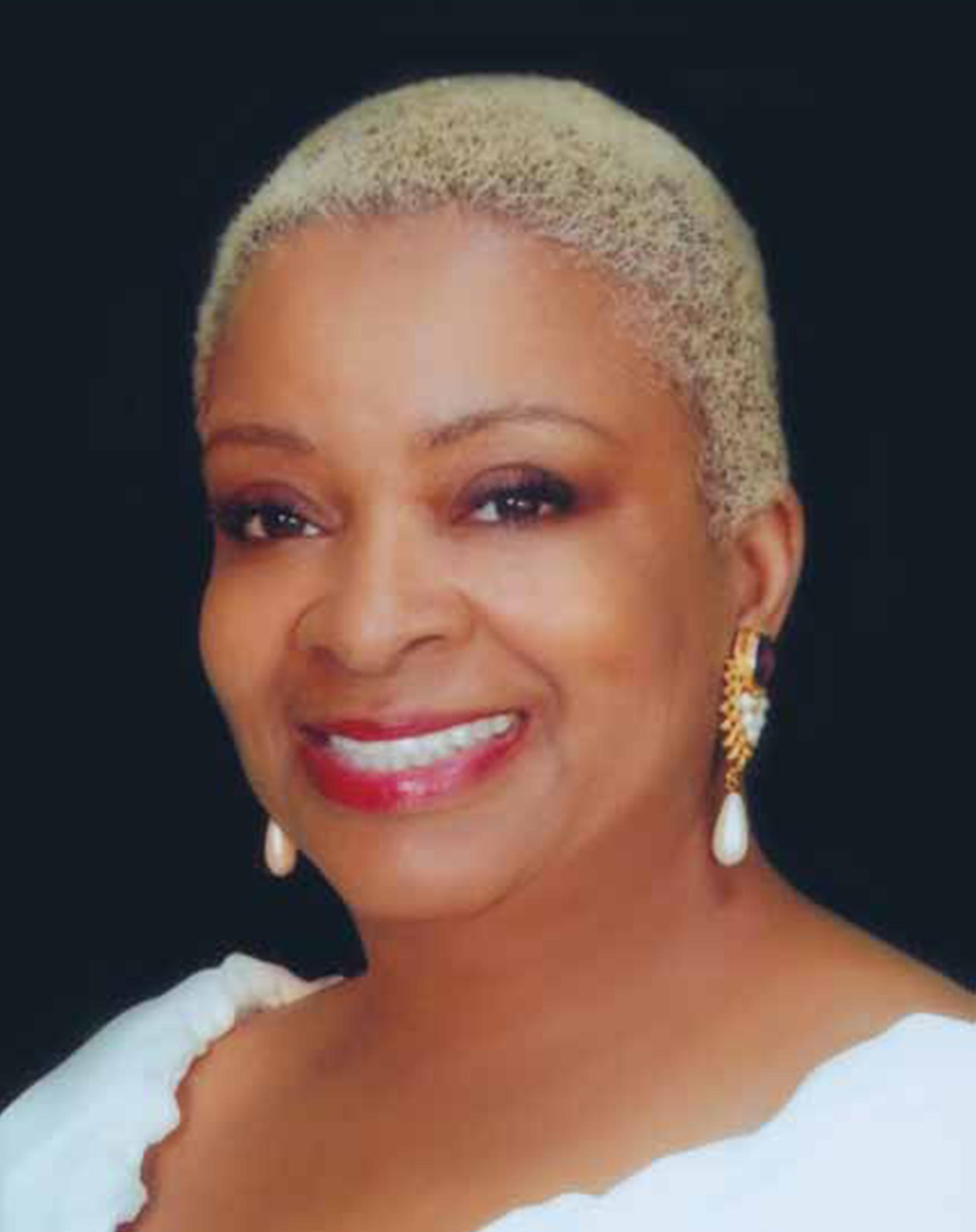
- Jones in 2021

Member of the Georgia House of Representatives
- Incumbent
- Assumed office January 10, 2005
- Preceded by: John Noel
- Constituency: 44th District (2005–2013); 53rd District (2013–2023); 60th District (2023–Present)

Personal details
- Born: February 16
- Party: Democratic
- Occupation: Politician
- Website: sheilajones.org

Sheila Jones (born February 16) is an American politician. A Democrat, she is a member of the Georgia House of Representatives.

== Biography ==
Jones was born on February 16. For 34 years, she worked for Lockheed Martin in Marietta.

Jones is a member of Local 709 of the International Association of Machinists and Aerospace Workers. With the union, she held multiple offices, including Chairwoman of the Bylaws Committee, Delegate to the Grand Lodge and Women's Conventions, member of the Legislative Committee, Shop Steward, and trustee; she was the first woman trustee. As a member of the Legislative Committee, she worked with politicians in Washington, D.C., namely working to pass labor legislation.

Jones is a member of the Democratic Party of Georgia. She was sworn into the Georgia House of Representatives on January 10, 2005. She represented the 44th district from 2005 to 2013, the 53rd district from 2013 to 2023, then the 60th district since 2023.

Jones has served as Democratic Whip. She has been a member of the Committees on Appropriations, Health, Judiciary Juvenile, Transportation, and Ways and Means. She has served as vice-chair of the Committee on Rail. She is a member of the Georgia Legislative Black Caucus, as which she has been its secretary and treasurer. She has also been secretary of the Caucuses of working-class families and woman legislators. She has also been a delegate to the Democratic National Convention three times.

Jones is or has been a member of the American Civil Liberties Union of Georgia, the Audubon, the Coalition of Labor Union Women, the Collier Heights National Historic District Community Association, Delta Sigma Theta, the Disabled American Veterans, the Georgia Conservation Voters, the National Council of Negro Women, the National Organization of Black Elected Legislative Women, and the Sierra Club, among other organizations.

In her term in the Georgia House, Jones was named Freshman Legislator of the Year by the Black Caucus. She has also won Woman Legislator of the Year, from the Cobb County Democratic Women; the Environmental Leadership Award, from the Georgia Conservation Voters; and the Joe Mack Wilson People's Champion Award, from the Cobb County Democratic Committee.

Georgia House of Representatives
Preceded by John Noel	Member of the Georgia House of Representatives from the 44th district 2005–2013	Succeeded by Don Parsons
Preceded by Elly Dobbs	Member of the Georgia House of Representatives from the 53rd district 2013–2023	Succeeded by Deborah Silcox
Preceded by Kim Schofield	Member of the Georgia House of Representatives from the 60th district 2023–Present	Incumbent
