= Matthew Gambill =

American politician

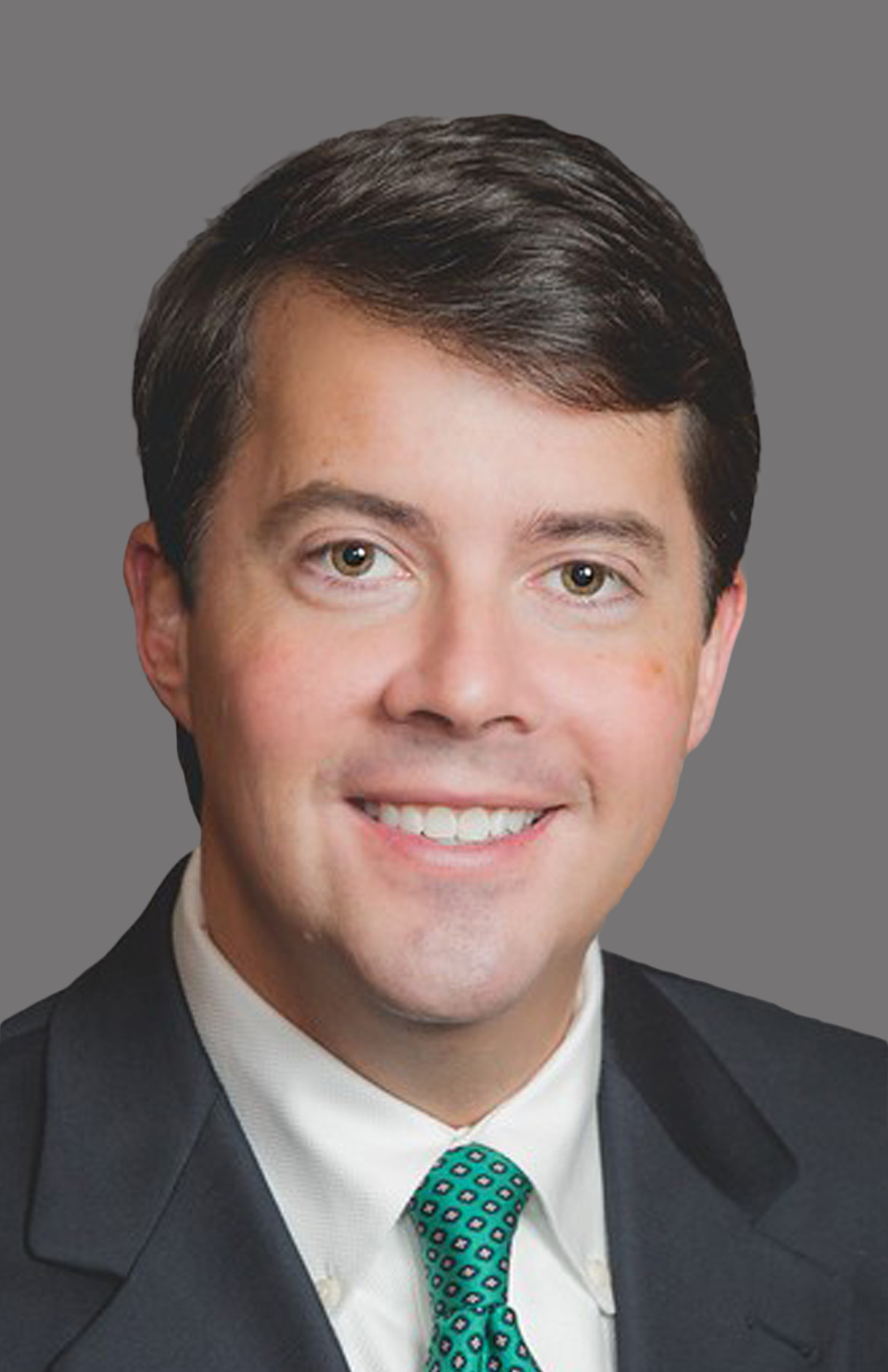

Member of the Georgia House of Representatives from the 15th district
- Incumbent
- Assumed office January 14, 2019

Personal details
- Born: Matthew Harris Gambill; February 27, 1981 (age 45)
- Party: Republican
- Spouse: Danae Roberts Gambill
- Children: Three
- Education: Lee University

Matthew Harris Gambill (born February 27, 1981) is an American politician from Cartersville, Georgia. Gambill is a Republican member of Georgia House of Representatives for District 15.

His uncle, Joe Frank Harris, served as Governor of Georgia from 1983 until 1991. His wife, Danae Roberts Gambill, previously served in the Georgia House of Representatives.
