= Chad Nimmer =

American politician (born 1976)

Member of the Georgia House of Representatives from the 178th district
- In office February 23, 2011 – January 14, 2019
- Preceded by: Mark Williams
- Succeeded by: Steven Meeks

Personal details
- Born: July 16, 1976 (age 50) Blackshear, Georgia, U.S.
- Party: Republican

Chad Nimmer (born July 16, 1976) is an American politician who served in the Georgia House of Representatives from the 178th district from 2011 to 2019.
