= Steven Meeks =

American politician

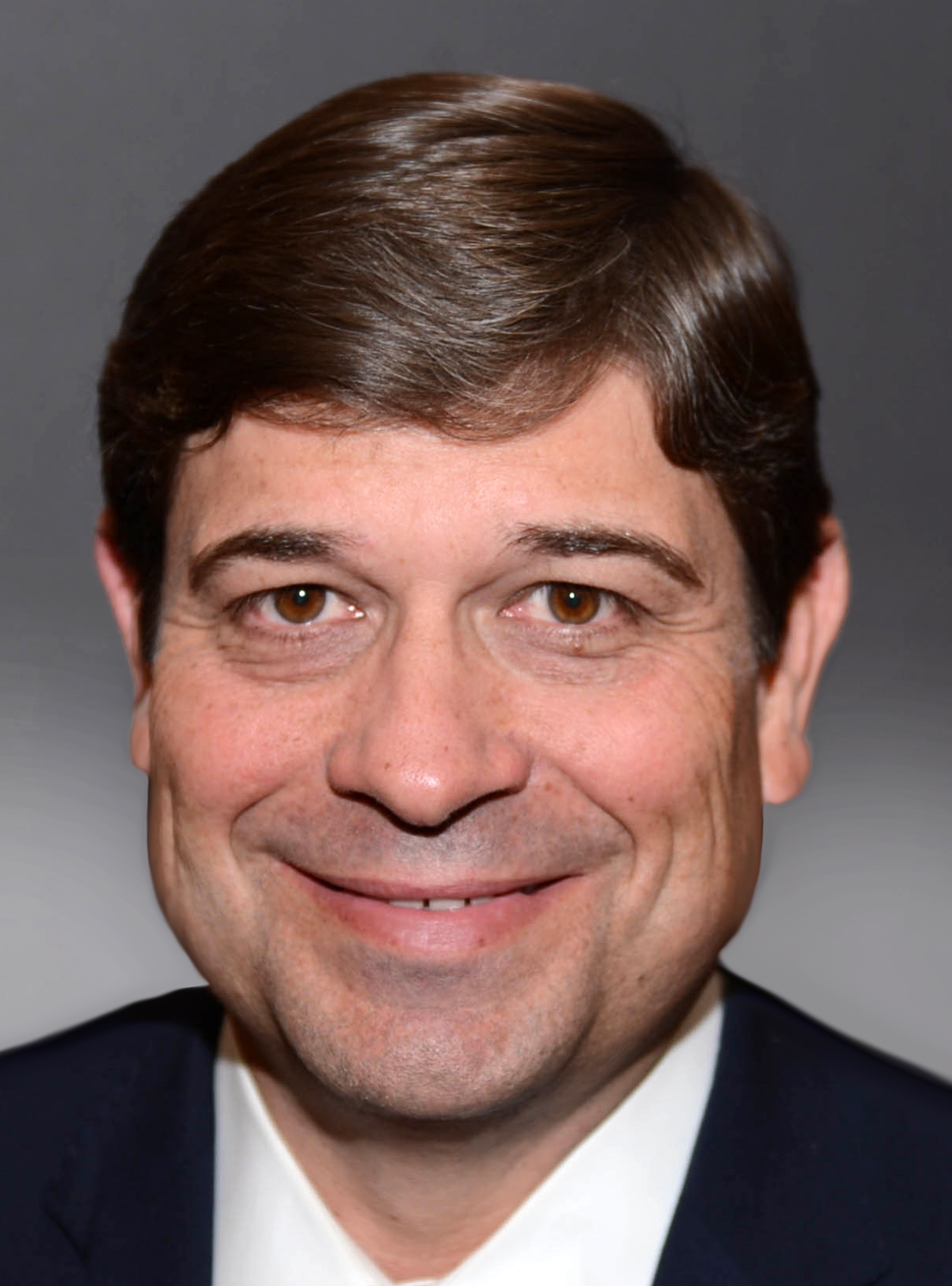
- Official headshot

Member of the Georgia House of Representatives from the 178th district
- Incumbent
- Assumed office January 14, 2019
- Preceded by: Chad Nimmer

Personal details
- Born: Steven Alton Meeks; September 10, 1974 (age 51)
- Party: Republican
- Spouse: Joy

Steven Alton Meeks (born September 10, 1974) is an American politician from Georgia. Meeks is a Republican member of the Georgia House of Representatives for District 178.
