= Georgia's 178th House of Representatives district =

State district in Georgia, USA

Georgia's 178th State House of Representatives district
Representative
Steven Meeks; R–Screven
- Demographics: 84.5% White; 8.8% Black; 4.4% Hispanic; 0.6% Asian
- Population: 53,711

District 178 elects one member of the Georgia House of Representatives. It contains the entirety of Bacon County and Pierce County, as well as parts of Appling County and Wayne County.

== Members ==
- Chad Nimmer (2011–2019)
- Steven Meeks (since 2019)
