= Georgia's 53rd House of Representatives district =

State district in Georgia, USA

Georgia's 53rd State House of Representatives district
Representative
Deborah Silcox; R–Sandy Springs
- Demographics: 67.8% White; 12.7% Black; 8.7% Hispanic; 3.8% Asian
- Population: 59,509

District 53 elects one member of the Georgia House of Representatives. It contains parts of Fulton County.

== Members ==
- Sheila Jones (2013–2023)
- Deborah Silcox (since 2023)
