= Georgia's 52nd House of Representatives district =

State district in Georgia, USA

Georgia's 52nd State House of Representatives district
Representative
Shea Roberts; D–Atlanta
- Demographics: 68.6% White; 11.2% Black; 13.3% Hispanic; 4.3% Asian
- Population: 57,065

District 52 elects one member of the Georgia House of Representatives. It contains parts of Fulton County.

== Members ==
- Joe Wilkinson (2001–2017)
- Deborah Silcox (2017–2021)
- Shea Roberts (since 2021)
