= Georgia's 15th House of Representatives district =

State district in Georgia, USA

Georgia's 15th State House of Representatives district
Representative
Matthew Gambill; R–Cartersville
- Demographics: 74.5% White; 13.4% Black; 8.7% Hispanic; 1.3% Asian
- Population: 55,338

District 15 elects one member of the Georgia House of Representatives. It contains parts of Bartow County.

== Members ==
- Matthew Gambill (since 2019)
