= Allen House =

Allen House may refer to:

== In the United States ==
- Allen House (Bon Secour, Alabama)
- James Allen House (Bon Secour, Alabama), historic house, neighbor of Allen House (Bon Secour, Alabama)
- Allen House (Monticello, Arkansas), listed on the National Register of Historic Places (NRHP)
- W. H. Allen House, Spotville, Arkansas
- Allen-Sommer-Gage House, Chico, California, listed on the NRHP in Butte County
- Theophilus Allen House, Palo Alto, California
- Allen House (Boulder, Colorado)
- Stanley-Woodruff-Allen House, West Hartford, Connecticut
- The Allen House (Westport, Connecticut)
- Charles Allen House (Christiana, Delaware)
- William Allen House, Elberton, Georgia, listed on the NRHP
- John Quincy Allen House, Buford, Georgia
- Bona Allen House, Buford, Georgia
- Willis Allen House, Marion, Illinois
- G. W. S. Allen House, Mount Pleasant, Iowa
- Allen House (Dyersville, Iowa)
- Henry J. Allen House, Wichita, Kansas
- J. B. Allen House (Chestnut Grove, Kentucky)
- Col. R. T. P. Allen House, Frankfort, Kentucky, listed on the NRHP
- John Allen House (Keene, Kentucky)
- James Allen House (Lexington, Kentucky)
- Allen-Alexander House, Paris, Kentucky, listed on the NRHP
- Carter Allen House, Smiths Grove, Kentucky
- Thomas Allen House, Smiths Grove, Kentucky, listed on the NRHP
- John C. Allen House, Summersville, Kentucky
- B. M. Allen House, Union, Kentucky
- Allen House (Keachi, Louisiana)
- Allen-Barringer House, West Monroe, Louisiana
- Allen House (Lowell, Massachusetts)
- Ethan Allen House and Gun Shop, Grafton, Massachusetts
- Nathaniel Topliff Allen Homestead, Newton, Massachusetts
- William Russell Allen House, Pittsfield, Massachusetts
- Elisha Allen House, Rehoboth, Massachusetts
- Abel Allen House, Weston, Massachusetts
- Charles Allen House (Worcester, Massachusetts)
- J. B. Allen House (Petoskey, Michigan)
- Stephenson-Allen House, Enterprise, Mississippi, listed on the NRHP
- Spratt-Allen-Aull House, Lexington, Missouri
- Ayers–Allen House, Metuchen, New Jersey
- Allen House (Shrewsbury, New Jersey)
- Jacob C. Allen House, Hackettstown, New Jersey
- Henry Allen House, Moravia, New York
- Allen-Beville House, New York, New York
- Dr. A. H. Allen Cottage, Saranac Lake, New York
- Allen-Mangum House, Grissom, North Carolina
- Allen House (Burlington, North Carolina)
- Lyman Allen House and Barn, Amanda, Ohio
- Darlon Allen House, Wellington, Ohio
- Dr. Peter Allen House, Kinsman, Ohio
- Goodwillie-Allen House, Bend, Oregon
- Allen-Madison House, North Kingstown
- Zachariah Allen House, Providence, Rhode Island
- Candace Allen House, Providence, Rhode Island
- Stephen Allen House, West Greenwich, Rhode Island
- Joel Allen House, Latta, South Carolina
- Allen House (Clarksville, Tennessee)
- Walter Granville Allen House, Cordova, Tennessee, listed on the NRHP
- Allen-Bell House, Bastrop, Texas, listed on the NRHP
- I. R. Allen House, Ennis, Texas, listed on the NRHP
- Robert C. Allen House, Hearne, Texas, listed on the NRHP
- Thomas L. Allen House, Coalville, Utah
- J. R. Allen House, Draper, Utah
- Dr. Samuel H. Allen House and Carriage House, Provo, Utah
- Knight-Allen House, Provo, Utah
- Sidna Allen House, Fancy Gap, Virginia
- Ethan Allen Homestead, Burlington, Vermont
- Nathan Allen House, Pawlet, Vermont
- Allen House Hotel, Olympia, Washington, listed on the NRHP
- Judge J. W. F. Allen House, Moorefield, West Virginia
- Abram Allen House, Milton, Wisconsin

== See also ==
- Charles Allen House (disambiguation)
- J. B. Allen House (disambiguation)
- James Allen House (disambiguation)
- John Allen House (disambiguation)
