= James Allen House =

James Allen House may refer to:

- James Allen House (Bon Secour, Alabama), historic house, neighbor of Allen House (Bon Secour, Alabama)
- James Allen House (Lexington, Kentucky), listed on the National Register of Historic Places

== See also ==
- Allen House (disambiguation)
