= Allen House (Boulder, Colorado) =

Historic house in Boulder, Colorado

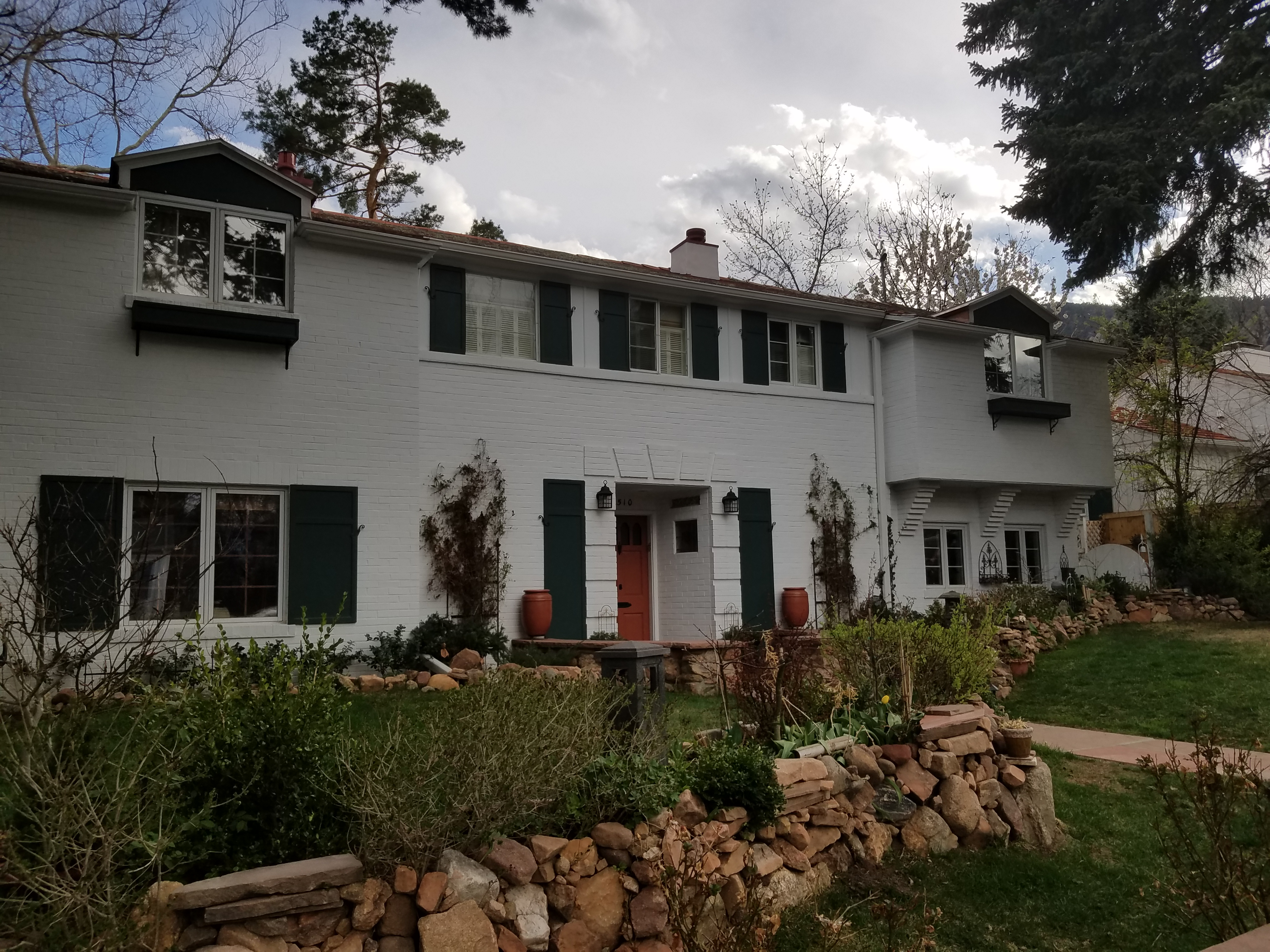
- The Allen House at 1510 Mariposa Avenue
- Interactive map of the Allen House area

General information
- Location: 1510 Mariposa Avenue, Boulder, Colorado, U.S.
- Coordinates: 39.9980°N 105.2732°W
- Year built: 1939–1940

The Allen House located at 1510 Mariposa Avenue in Boulder, Colorado, United States, is an Historic Landmark Building and registered as such with the City of Boulder. The structure is notable for its age, condition and for its membership in the Boulder Floral Park Historic District. The exterior is white-painted brick with a batten-board second floor. The recessed front entrance is decorated with quoins. Two stained-glass windows are incorporated into the side walls of the recessed entrance. Green shutters frame most of the windows as well as the front doorway.

== History ==
The Allen House was constructed in 1939/1940 as part of the first planned community in Boulder. The district, comprising eight residences and an eight-car community garage, is commonly referred to throughout Boulder as "Little Russia" - presumably, due to its origins as a private, communal, non-developer driven housing project.

In 1939, Henry Weihofen, a young law professor at the University of Colorado, dissatisfied with available faculty housing prospects in Boulder, was urged into action by University regent Valentine Fischer. The two men gathered a group of like-minded, low-ranking, (and low-salaried) faculty together to find a solution. James G. Allen, a junior member of the history department, joined with Weihofen and six others. In a series of evening meetings the eight families decided on a plan and selected a site for the innovative community housing project. The group held a drawing to decide which lot went to which family. After all eight families had moved in (by April 1940), landscaping of the Commons and the building of an outdoor fireplace and shelter house began. All of the original structures exist today. Handball courts that were part of the James Hunter's original Commons landscaping plan were never built. The community garage burned down, but was rebuilt to duplicate the original.

Although, each set of house plans was based on individual families' needs and tastes, all of the houses were designed so the living rooms would not interfere with either the Commons or the mountain views. The Allen House has undergone several interior and exterior alterations over the years, the structure's overall footprint however, remains close to the original. An upstairs bedroom was expanded during the early 1980s. This added symmetry and balance to the street-facing side of the house. In 2011, a small sunroom (opening to the Commons) was added at the rear of the house. A Japanese-style garden encloses the backyard patio area.

James and Marie Allen had two children, Elizabeth and James Jr. James Allen Sr. died in 1970. He had served as chairman of the University of Colorado history department and was recognized as an authority on the history of early space exploration. Marie Allen sold the home to Hunter and Irene Rawlings in 1972. Hunter Rawlings was a member of the CU Classics Department at the time. Lawrence Kaptein (a faculty member in the College of Music at CU) and Ellen Brock (Associate Director of CU's Science Discovery Program), along with their young daughter, Emily, purchased the home from the Rawlings family in 1992.

The original blueprints for the Allen House, James G. Hunter's landscaping plan for the Commons area, construction-related documents, and information profiling the Allen family can be found at the Carnegie Branch (local history archive) of the Boulder Public Library. Photographs of the Allen House have been published in several books and newspapers. Pictures of the rear garden and Commons area can be seen in Gayl Gray's Vintage and Artistic Homes of Boulder. Interior photographs from the Rawlings' era can be seen in Historic Homes of Boulder County.
