= John Allen House =

John Allen House may refer to:

- John Quincy Allen House, Buford, Georgia, listed on the National Register of Historic Places (NRHP)
- John C. Allen House, Summersville, Kentucky, listed on the NRHP in Green County, Kentucky
- John Allen House (Keene, Kentucky), listed on the NRHP in Woodford County, Kentucky

== See also ==
- Allen House (disambiguation)
