= Charles Allen House =

Charles Allen House may refer to:

- Charles Allen House (Christiana, Delaware), listed on the National Register of Historic Places (NRHP)
- Charles Allen House (Worcester, Massachusetts), NRHP-listed

== See also ==
- Allen House (disambiguation)
