= J. B. Allen House =

J. B. Allen House may refer to:

- J. B. Allen House (Chestnut Grove, Kentucky), listed on the NRHP in Shelby County, Kentucky
- J. B. Allen House (Petoskey, Michigan), listed on the National Register of Historic Places in Emmet County, Michigan

== See also ==
- Allen House (disambiguation)
