= Landlord (disambiguation) =

A landlord is the owner of a house, apartment, condominium, land, or real estate which is rented or leased to an individual or business.

Landlord or variants may also refer to:

== Film ==
- Der Herr im Haus, a 1940 German drama film a.k.a. The Landlord
- The Landlord, a 1970 American dramedy film by Hal Ashby in his directorial debut
- The Landlord (2007 film), an American comedy short film
- The Landlords (film), a 2012 Italian dramedy film a.k.a. Padroni di casa
- Landlord (film), a 2026 Indian Kannada-language film directed by Jadesh K Hampi

== Music ==
- Landlord (album)
- The Landlords, an American hardcore punk band

== Other uses ==
- Landlord (beer), a brand of English ale brewed by Timothy Taylor Brewery
- Pub landlord, a manager of a UK pub
- The Landlord, a 1966 novel by Kristin Hunter adapted into the aforementioned 1970 Hal Ashby film
- LandLords, a fantasy play-by-mail game

== See also ==
- Dou dizhu or Fight the Landlord, a card game
- The Landlady (disambiguation)
- The Landlord at Lion's Head, an 1897 novel by William Dean Howells
- The Landlord's Game, a precursor board game to Monopoly
- The Pub Landlord, a comic character played by Al Murray
