= The Landlord at Lion's Head =

1897 novel by William Dean Howells

The Landlord at Lion's Head is a novel by American writer William Dean Howells. The book was first published in 1897 by Harper & Brothers.

== Plot summary ==
The Durgin family, owners of a New Hampshire country house near a mountain whose peak resembles the head of a lion, plan to move to California because of a bad crop season and Mr. Durgin's ill health. As the family is packing, Mr. Westover, an artist, arrives. He pays the Durgins to stay in their home while he paints an image of the mountain. Jeff Durgin, the youngest son of the family, caters to Mr. Westover, who scolds him for scaring the nearby Whitwell children, Cynthia and Frank, with his dog. Instead of moving, Mrs. Durgin decides to change their home into a hotel; Mr. Durgin passes away in the winter before the hotel is opened.

Five years later, Mr. Westovers pays another visit and is welcomed as a friend. The small country house has been renovated and expanded, and the Inn at Lion's Head is a huge success. The Whitwell family now helps run the inn. Mr. Westover catches a glimpse of Cynthia Whitwell and notices how beautiful she has become. When Jeff brings out a picnic lunch to the boarders of the hotel, Mrs. Marven, an upper class lady, does not allow him to eat with them; when Mrs. Durgin hears of this she kicks Mrs. Marven and her daughter out of the hotel.

Jeff studies law at Harvard, but he is shunned by the wealthier upper-class students. He is suspended from school when he is caught with a friend who breaks a streetlight. Instead of going back to Lion's Head, he goes to Europe for the summer, and learns all about the hotels there.

Once more, Mr. Westover spends the summer at Lion's head; Jeff arrives back from Europe on the same ship as wealthy Mrs. Vostrand and her daughter Genivieve. Jeff is attracted to Genivieve, but Mrs. Durgin does not allow him to associate with the upper-class boarders and sends Jeff back to Boston.

The Vostrands settle in Boston, spending more and more time with Jeff Durgin. Jeff's proposes marriage to Genivieve, but she tells him that she is in love with an Italian. The Vostrands depart for Italy, leaving Jeff heartbroken. He returns to Lion's Head and is soon engaged to Cynthia, who Westover believes is far too fine for a blackguard like Jeff. Jeff tells his mother that he is content with being the Landlord at Lion's Head; she disapproves of both his low ambitions and his engagement to Cynthia.

Jackson, Jeff's eldest brother, falls ill and is sent to Egypt for the winter to try to regain his health. Although Jeff no longer has plans to become a lawyer, Cynthia and Mrs. Durgin insist that he return to Harvard for his final year.

Invited to an exclusive tea party, Jeff meets Bessie Lynde, an upper-class girl who finds him attractive. Bessie's brother Alan disapproves, but because of problems with alcohol is unable to intervene. At another tea party, Westover scolds Jeff for getting Alan drunk. The next day Bessie finds a doctor who sends Alan to rehab. Forgetting Cynthia, Jeff begins courting Bessie Lynde, but soon realizes that she is just out for adventure. Westover tells Jeff he must break things off with Cynthia, but Jeff decides to be honest with her in hopes that she will forgive him. She breaks off their engagement, but stays at the hotel because of her devotion to Mrs. Durgin and Jackson.

Distraught, Jeff returns to Boston. On his graduation day from Harvard, Alan Lynde attacks him with a whip, injuring him badly. Jeff vows revenge against him.

Jackson returns from Egypt but he is still extremely ill. Westover takes him to Lion's Head immediately and then writes to Jeff, who joins them. Jackson passes away a couple days later. Soon after, Mrs. Durgin is paralyzed by a stroke, and only Cynthia is able to understand her speech. Mrs. Durgin's dying wish is for Cynthia and Jeff to get back together, but Cynthia cannot forgive Jeff.

Mrs. Durgin passes away at the end of the summer. Jeff encounters Alan Lynde, who is in rehab nearby. Tempted to kill him, he restrains himself and lets him go. Jeff then leaves on a trip to Europe, leaving Whitwell in charge of the hotel and taking out insurance.

In the next chapter, Whitwell visits Westover in Boston with the news that the hotel has burned down; he fears that the insurance company may claim that he burned the hotel down to collect the payout. The Whitwell family moves to Boston.

Westover hears that Genivieve has married, but has divorced because her husband beat her and treated her badly. She then meets Jeff Durgin in Europe and the two are engaged, but Mrs. Vostrand wants Westover's opinion before she approves the marriage. Westover sends a letter to Jeff in which he explains what he thinks of him. Jeff shows the letter to Mrs. Vostrand and she gives her approval. They marry, and, with Genivieve's daughter Bice, purchase the Whitwell's house and rebuild the Inn at Lion's Head.

Westover's paints a portrait of Cynthia and asks for her hand in marriage. She tells him she would need to think about it and they talk it over. Cynthia tells Westover she will always need to call him Mr. Westover and the story ends.

== Characters ==
Jeff Durgin is the youngest son of the Durgin family. Jeff is of good health compared to the rest of the men in the family. Jeff is a strong, stout good looking man and attends Harvard. He is trying to fit in amongst the upper class, but is looked at as an outsider. He is always causing trouble whether accidental or purposeful.

Jere Westover is a painter who was able to climb the social ladder from country lad to an upper class painter. He acts as sort of a father figure to Jeff, but secretly dislikes him. He narrates for much of the story.

Mrs. Durgin is a strong woman. She keeps the house in order and acts as both man and woman of the house. It is her dream to have Jeff go to Harvard and become a lawyer. She wants more for Jeff than what she has ever had.

Cynthia Whitwell is a beautiful, smart, young woman who has enabled Jeff to get through school and into Harvard. She is a woman that always does right by everyone and does not have a single flaw in the novel. At a young age she had to act as the woman of her house because of the death of her mother and practically raised her little brother Frank.

Frank Whitwell does not play a vital role in the book, but is an intelligent boy. He is always doing as he is told and plans on going into the ministry.

Mr. Whitwell is a man very wary of the Durgin family, especially Jeff. He takes a great interest in the souls of dead people and loves philosophy. He is older and works for the inn by taking the women out on nature walks and teaching them of the different plants. He is very against Cynthia marrying Jeff.

Jackson Durgin is a quiet man who goes about his business. He always has a sickly look to him no matter what time of year. He runs the hotel and helped make it great. One thing he is very interested in is working the planchette, a device used for contacting the souls of the dead. He dies at the age of forty.

Mrs. Vostrand is a wealthy woman who cares for her children all by herself because Mr. Vostrand is never around. She showed Westover much care in Europe when he was visiting in his younger years. Her manners are impeccable as well as her daughter Genivieve's. She is a beautiful older woman.

Genivieve Vostrand is a character that one never gets to know very well in the novel. She is spoken for mostly by her mother. She is very well mannered and beautiful.

Jombateeste is a Canuck who only will work for Whitwell. He is a very peculiar man who loves the winter far more than the summer. He mostly tends to the horses and cuts down trees in the clearing.

Bessie Lynde is a lady of class who is searching for adventure. She is being raised by her aunt because both her parents died when she was young. She is not very attractive yet there is something about her that causes Jeff to be interested in her. She is extremely smart and witty causing her to lose interest in most men quickly.

Alan Lynde is the brother of Bessie Lynde. He is considered very intelligent and would be able to do anything with his life if he were able to stop drinking. He is very against Bessie's relationship with Jeff Durgin and associating with people of a lower class.

== Publication history and response ==
The book was among the best selling books of that year, selling less than Quo Vadis by Sienkiewicz and The Choir Invisible by James Lane Allen. The book initially sold for $1.50, but in some cities cost $1.75.

The black and white illustrations in the book are by W. T. Smedley and were not in the first edition of the novel. Smedley is best known for his illustrations in Mark Twain's A Dog's Tale.

== Criticism ==
According to Haralson, Jeff is a character unlike most of Howells' characters. Jeff has a palpable sex drive and powerful sex appeal are very unusual characteristics of a character in a Howells' piece of literature. Jeff is a "Beast-man" who Howells "longed to see subdued and tamed." Unlike Howells' other works, by the end of the novel Jeff Durgin achieves success, starting a renaissance hotel and marrying Genivieve whom he had been pursuing for a while. Howells, a realist writer, usually does not have the protagonist succeed in the end of the novel and strays from his normal schema in this respect.

According The Canadian Magazine, The Landlord at Lion's Head is written too mechanically. The Canadians took offense to the character Jombateeste—the undersized tree chopper—and believe Howells has a misconception of the weather in Canada.

According to Harper's New Monthly Magazine Howells' shows literary mastery. He seemingly knows each character on a deep level and is able to convey each character's personality as if he is physically watching the events of the novel from a bird's eye view. Howells does a skillful job in allowing the reader to see the rural landscape of New Hampshire as well.

Susan Allan Toth recognizes The Landlord at Lion's Head as "The most neglected and misrepresented of all William Dean Howells' major novels". Toth believes that because the novel does not contain the social data in comparison to novels such as The Rise of Silas Lapham it has been mostly ignored. The major aspect of the story modern scholars focus on is the characterization of Jeff Durgin. Toth's article focuses on the character of Jere Westover. She points out the similarities of Westover's life with Howells' own life. Toth mentions "Westover's illusions seem to be those of a man who desperately wants to believe in a society in which he has struggled long and hard for acceptance; he clings to his faith like a convert." Westover throughout his whole life has worked to become a man of stature and now that he has succeeded he judges everyone so critically, especially Jeff. Toth also recognizes that both Bessie Lynde and Westover have been ruined by the upper class Boston world they live in being so focused on what is proper and what is not it controls every facet of their lives. The characters Howells portrays in the novel represent the changing of times. The success of Jeff Durgin at the end of the novel is trying to depict the world heading in an "anti-puritan" direction.

McMurray brings to our attention in "Point of View in Howells: A Landlord at Lion’s Head" that Jeff Durgin is not only viewed differently by every character in the novel, but every character has a different view of him at different times in the novel. Whitwell puts his thoughts on Jeff perfectly by saying "I don’t suppose a fellow’s so much to blame if he’s got the devil in him, as what the devil is." Explaining Jeff in a way a country folk would understand. By the end of the story Whitwell is praising everything that Jeff has accomplished with the hotel Whitwell even says "I’d ought to feel good to him; and I guess that’s the way I did feel come to boil it down. He’s got a way with him, you know, when you’re with him, that makes you like him. He may have a knife in your ribs the whole while, but so long as he don’t turn it, you don’t seem to know it, and can’t help likin’ him." Whitwell likes Jeff now that he bought his house from him and is no longer engaged to his daughter. Whitwell is proud of him describing all he has accomplished to Westover. He now believes people can change although Westover is still skeptical.
