= Charles Allen (Massachusetts politician) =

American politician (1797–1869)

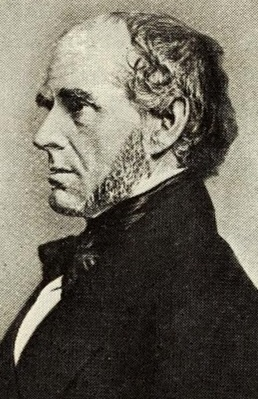

Member of the U.S. House of Representatives from Massachusetts's 5th district
- In office March 4, 1849 – March 3, 1853
- Preceded by: Charles Hudson
- Succeeded by: William Appleton

Member of the Massachusetts Senate
- In office 1836-1837

Member of the Massachusetts House of Representatives
- In office 1830, 1833, 1835, 1840

Personal details
- Born: August 9, 1797 Worcester, Massachusetts
- Died: August 6, 1869 (aged 71) Worcester, Massachusetts
- Party: Free Soil; Republican
- Education: Yale College (A.M.); Harvard Law School (LL.D.)
- Occupation: Politician, lawyer, judge

Charles Allen (August 9, 1797 – August 6, 1869) was a United States representative from Massachusetts.

== Early years ==
He was born in Worcester, Massachusetts, on August 9, 1797, the son of Joseph Allen and grandnephew of Samuel Adams). Allen attended Leicester Academy (1809–1811) and Yale College (1811–1812) and studied law. He was admitted to the bar in 1821 and commenced practice in New Braintree. He returned to Worcester in 1824 and continued the practice of law. On October 23, 1827, he was elected a member of the American Antiquarian Society.

== Career ==
Allen was a member of the Massachusetts House of Representatives in 1830, 1833, 1835, and 1840; he also served in the Massachusetts State Senate in 1836 and 1837. In 1842, he was a member of the Maine-New Brunswick boundary commission created by the Webster–Ashburton Treaty that ended the Aroostook War. He was a judge of the Court of Common Pleas from 1842 to 1845 and a delegate to the 1848 Whig National Convention in Philadelphia. He was twice elected to Congress as a Free-Soil Party candidate (March 4, 1849 – March 3, 1853), but did not seek renomination in 1852. In 1849 he edited the Boston Whig, later called the Republican.

After leaving Congress, he resumed the practice of law in Worcester. He was a member of the state's constitutional convention in 1853, and was chief justice of the Suffolk County Superior Court from 1858 to 1867.

He received the honorary degree of A.M. from Yale in 1836 and that of LL.D. from Harvard in 1863. He was a delegate to the Peace Conference of 1861 held in Washington, D.C. to try to prevent the start of the Civil War.

== Death ==
Charles Allen died in Worcester, Massachusetts, on August 6, 1869. He was interred in the Rural Cemetery.

The home on which he began construction, the Charles Allen House, was completed by his descendants and was added to the National Register of Historic Places in 1980.

== See also ==
- Charles Allen House (Worcester, Massachusetts)

U.S. House of Representatives
Preceded by Charles Hudson	Member of the U.S. House of Representatives from Massachusetts's 5th congressional district March 4, 1849 – March 3, 1853	Succeeded by William Appleton
