= Willis Allen =

American politician (1806–1859)

Member of the U.S. House of Representatives from Illinois
- In office March 4, 1851 – March 3, 1855
- Preceded by: John A. McClernand (2nd); District established (9th)
- Succeeded by: John Wentworth (2nd); Samuel S. Marshall (9th)
- Constituency: 2nd district (1851-53); 9th district (1853-55)

Member of the Illinois Senate
- In office 1844-1847

Member of the Illinois House of Representatives
- In office 1838-1840

Personal details
- Born: December 15, 1806 Roanoke, Virginia, U.S.
- Died: April 15, 1859 (aged 52) Harrisburg, Illinois, U.S.
- Party: Democratic

Willis Allen (December 15, 1806 – April 15, 1859) was a U.S. representative from Illinois, and the father of William J. Allen.

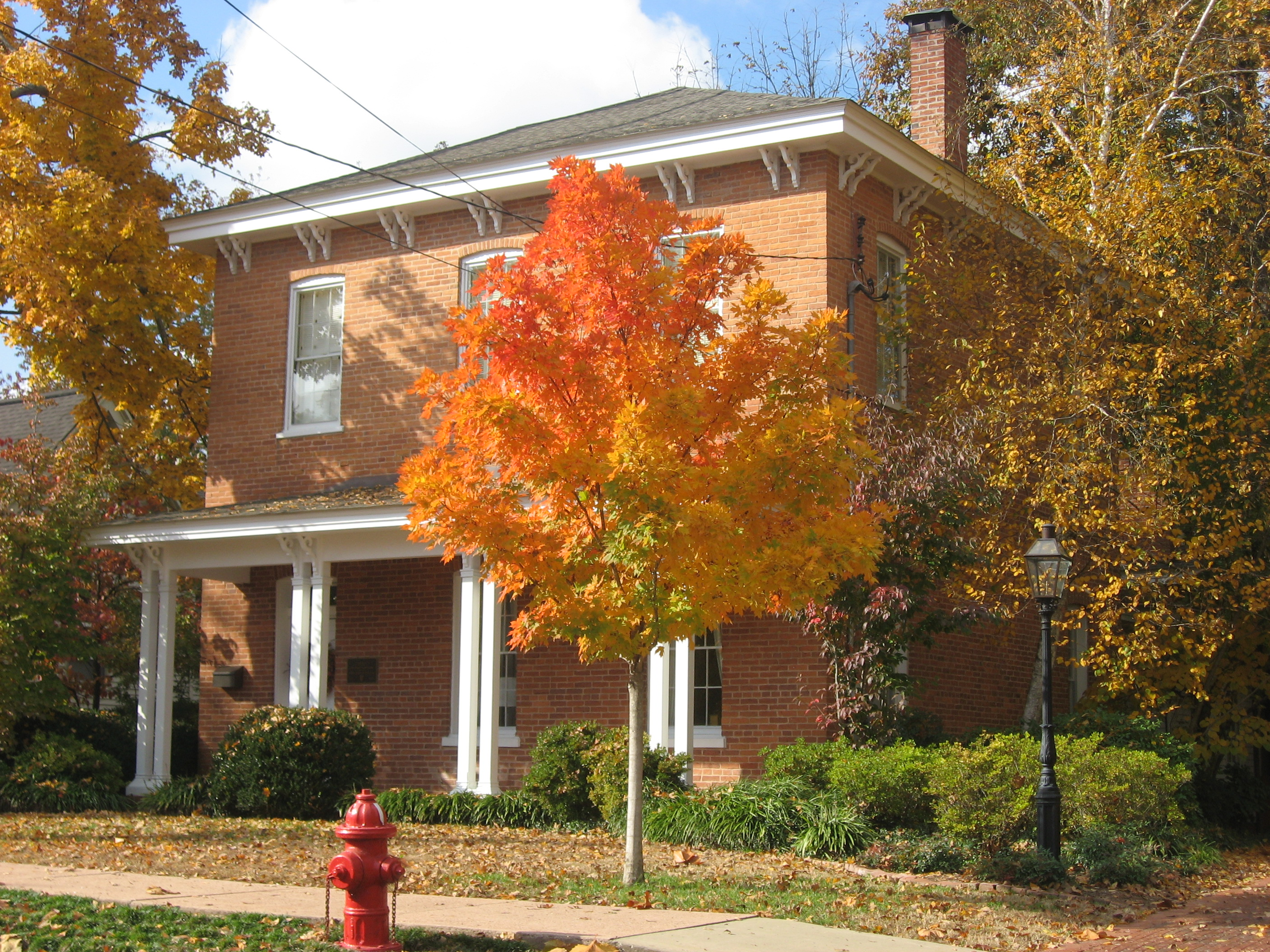
Allen's house in Marion

Born near Roanoke, Virginia, Allen attended the common schools. He taught school. He moved to Tennessee and settled in Wilson County. He moved to Franklin (now Williamson) County, Illinois in 1830 and engaged in agricultural pursuits. He studied law. He was admitted to the bar and commenced practice in Marion. He was sheriff of Franklin County 1834–1838. He served as member of the Illinois House of Representatives 1838–1840. He served as prosecuting attorney of the 1st judicial circuit in 1841. He served as member of the Illinois Senate 1844–1847. He served as member of the state constitutional convention in 1847 and 1848.

Allen was elected as a Democrat to the Thirty-second and Thirty-third Congresses (March 4, 1851 – March 3, 1855). He was not a candidate for reelection in 1854. He resumed the practice of his profession.

Allen was elected judge of the twenty-sixth circuit court of Illinois on March 2, 1859, and served until his death while holding court in Harrisburg on April 15, 1859. He was interred in a family plot near his home and later reinterred in Rose Hill Cemetery in Marion.

Allen's house in Marion is still standing; it was added to the National Register of Historic Places in 1982, qualifying because of its connection to Allen.

U.S. House of Representatives
Preceded by John A. McClernand	Member of the U.S. House of Representatives from Illinois's 2nd congressional district 1851–1853	Succeeded by John Wentworth
Preceded by District created	Member of the U.S. House of Representatives from Illinois's 9th congressional district 1853–1855	Succeeded by Samuel S. Marshall
