= Boulder Floral Park Historic District =

Historic district in Colorado

Coordinates: 39.9977°N 105.2731°W

The Floral Park Historic District is a block of eight homes in Boulder, Colorado that constitute the first planned unit development in Boulder County, Colorado. The homes were built between 1939 and 1940 by a cooperative of eight professors from the nearby University of Colorado, and designated as an historic district by the City of Boulder in 1978.

== Description ==
The Floral Park Historic District was the first planned-unit development in Boulder County (1939) as well as the city's first historic district (1978). Floral Park was a forerunner of planned housing in the western United States and predates, by thirty years, other such developments in Colorado. The block is commonly referred to throughout Boulder as "Little Russia."

Designed by architect James M. Hunter, the eight homes occupy the single city block bounded by Mariposa, Bluebell, 15th and 16th Streets in Boulder. Hunter also designed a detailed landscaping plan for the entire block (including handball courts - which were never built). By design and agreement of the original cooperative members, the houses all incorporate a similar architectural design style (referred to as Monterey-Colonial), including painted-white brick, batten-board siding, green, white, or blue shutters and red tile roofs. The eight homes share a common eight-unit garage. (The original garage burned down and has since been replaced with a duplicate the original).

== History ==
In the late 1930s, Henry Weihofen, a young professor at CU-Boulder, had become dissatisfied with available housing options for university faculty families. With the help of university regent, Valentine Fischer, Weihofen gathered a group of junior faculty together (all on low salaries) to develop a housing plan. The eight professors were: Henry Weihofen (law), James G. Allen (history), Francis (Frank) Geck (fine arts), Morris E. Garnsey (economics), Earl F. Swisher (Asian studies), Paul V. Thompson (English), Norman A. Parker (mechanical engineering), and Elbert W. Harrington (speech). Over a series of evening meetings, the eight faculty members and their wives decided to purchase Block 17 in the Floral Park area (just east of Chautauqua Park) with the intention of creating a "community housing project" for the enjoyment of their growing families. At the philosophical core of their housing plan was the creation of a shared open space. The city agreed to vacate the alleyway, leaving a large, undeveloped section of land running through the center of the block. The families designated this area - The Commons.

The block has historically been known as Faculty Row (owing to the original owners' association with the university) or Red Square (owing to the red roofs, the square outline of the development) or Little Russia (owing to the project's communal/non-developer driven design and origins. ). At a meeting of the Boulder Landmarks Board on May 21, 1977, architect James M. Hunter noted that from its inception, many of Boulder's citizens associated "Communist overtones" with the Floral Park project.

The group held a drawing to decide which lot went to which family. The eight houses, largely built using salvaged brick from Boulder's recently demolished State Preparatory School (built in 1895 and located at 17th and Pearl), were constructed around the perimeter of the Commons. A small Commons shelter house with flagstone patio and rustic stone fireplace were soon added.

The block's property owners have agreed to preserve the open, park-like setting of the Commons and the architectural unity of the block. While the majority of the homes have incorporated modest additions and/or alterations over the years, the overall size and character of the District has been well maintained. The designation of the block as an historic district has further ensured the preservation of the area's unique character and historic importance.

A commemorative plaque (installed on the front of the community garage by the City of Boulder) reads: "This block was designated as a planned unit 30 yrs. before similar developments in Boulder. Since 1939, when eight C.U. faculty families conceived the idea, the architecture and the environmental unity have been preserved through a gentlepersons' agreement." - HD-77-1

In a letter written to the Landmarks Board in 1977, Morris E. Garnsey, one of the original homeowners stated that "I am certain that thirty-five years from now a third generation of owner-occupants will look back upon the origins of this area with gratitude and admiration." (Minutes, Boulder Landmarks Board, November, 1978)

Current homeowners are required to maintain the general appearance of the neighborhood, as defined in the District's published Guidelines and Covenants.

The blueprints for several of the residences, the landscaping plan for the Commons area, profiles of the original owners, and many other construction-related documents are housed at the Carnegie Branch (local history archive) of the Boulder Public Library.

In 2013, the City of Boulder Historic Preservation Department created a Floral Park Historic District website. The site includes a detailed early history of the development, short biographies of the original homeowners, and historic and current photographs of the property and residences. The site address is: floralparkboulder.weebly.com.
