= Landlady (disambiguation) =

A landlady is a female landlord.

Landlady or The Landlady may also refer to:

- The Landlady (novella), an 1847 story by Fyodor Dostoyevsky
- "The Landlady" (short story), a 1959 story by Roald Dahl
- Bariwali (The Landlady), a 2000 Indian Bengali-language film
- "Landlady", a 2017 song by U2 from Songs of Experience

== See also ==
- Landlord (disambiguation)
