= Charles Hudson (American politician) =

American politician

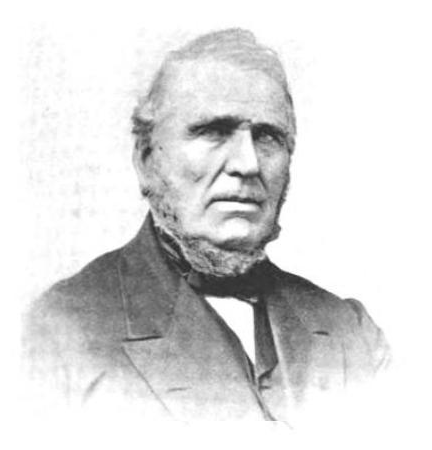

Member of the U.S. House of Representatives from Massachusetts's 5th district
- In office May 3, 1841 – March 3, 1849
- Preceded by: Levi Lincoln Jr.
- Succeeded by: Charles Allen

Member of the Lexington, Massachusetts Board of Selectmen
- In office 1868–1875

Member of the Massachusetts Governor's Council
- In office 1839–1841

Member of the Massachusetts State Senate
- In office 1833–1839

Member of the Massachusetts House of Representatives
- In office 1828–1833

Personal details
- Born: November 14, 1795 Marlborough, Massachusetts
- Died: May 4, 1881 (aged 85) Lexington, Massachusetts
- Party: Whig
- Spouse(s): Ann Rider, m. 1825, Martha B. Rider m. 1830
- Profession: Minister

Military service
- Battles/wars: War of 1812

Charles Hudson (November 14, 1795 – May 4, 1881) was an American minister, writer, historian and politician. He served in both houses of the Massachusetts General Court, on the Massachusetts Governor's Council, and as United States representative from Massachusetts.

== Early life ==
Hudson was born in Marlborough on November 14, 1795. He was the son of Stephen Hudson, who served during the American Revolutionary War, having been captured and confined by the British in Philadelphia.

== Education ==
Hudson attended the common schools and later an academy, taught school, served in the War of 1812 and studied theology. He was ordained as a Universalist minister in 1819 and located in Westminster, where he served as pastor for 20 years.

== Public service ==
Hudson was elected a member of the Massachusetts House of Representatives, where he represented the town of Westminster, Massachusetts from 1828 to 1833. From 1833 to 1839, he represented Worcester County in the Massachusetts State Senate. In 1839 he became a member of the Executive Council, and served until 1841. He was a member of the Massachusetts State Board of Education.

Hudson was elected as a Whig to the Twenty-seventh Congress to fill the vacancy caused by the resignation of Levi Lincoln Jr. Hudson was reelected to the Twenty-eighth, Twenty-ninth, and Thirtieth Congresses, and served from May 3, 1841, to March 3, 1849.

Hudson was an unsuccessful candidate for reelection in 1848 to the Thirty-first Congress, and moved to Lexington. He lived in a large house on the town Common ("Battle Green"), about where the driveway of the Hancock Church is today. The house was moved to Belfry Terrace in the early 1900s. He served as a selectman of Lexington from 1868 to 1875, and wrote a comprehensive history of the town first published 1868. Hudson presided at the centennial celebration of the battle of Lexington in 1875, and delivered an address.

He was elected a member of the American Antiquarian Society in 1844.

From 1849 to 1853, Hudson served as a naval officer of the port of Boston Custom House, edited the Boston Daily Atlas for many years. He was the assessor of Internal Revenue for the Sixth Collection District, 1864–1868.

Hudson was also an author of religious textbooks.

Hudson was reportedly a close friend of President Abraham Lincoln.

== Death and burial ==
Hudson died in Lexington on May 4, 1881, and buried in Munroe Cemetery, on Massachusetts Avenue in that town.

== Hudson, Massachusetts ==
The town of Hudson, Massachusetts is named after Charles Hudson. Though many mistakenly believe that the naming of the town was the result of his gift toward the construction of a public library, in fact, the naming honor was granted prior to his offer. The town was established on March 31, 1866, and after being notified that the town had been named in his honor, Charles Hudson responded in 1867 with an offer to contribute $500 in matching funds toward the establishment of a new library.

== Publications ==
- Letters to Rev. Hosea Ballou (1827)
- Reply to Walter Balfour (1829)
- History of Westminster (Boston, 1832)
- Doubts Concerning the Battle of Bunker Hill (1857)
- Historical Address at the Centennial at Westminster (1859)
- History of Marlborough (1862)
- History of Lexington, with Genealogical Register of Lexington Families (1868)

Hudson prepared congressional reports on the "Protective Policy," legislative reports on "Capital Punishment," "The Northeastern Boundary," and "The Incompetency of Witnesses on Account of Religious Belief," besides articles for periodicals and newspapers.

== Notes ==
U.S. House of Representatives
Preceded by Levi Lincoln Jr.	Member of the U.S. House of Representatives from Massachusetts's 5th congressional district May 3, 1841 – March 3, 1849	Succeeded by Charles Allen
