= Carter Allen House =

- U.S. National Register of Historic Places
- Location: Off U.S. Route 31 W, near Smiths Grove, Kentucky
- Coordinates: 37°04′47″N 86°13′40″W
- Area: 1 acre (0.40 ha)
- Built: c.1870
- Built by: Barner, Harrison
- Architectural style: Greek Revival
- MPS: Warren County MRA
- NRHP reference No.: 79003541
- Added to NRHP: December 18, 1979

The Carter Allen House, near Smiths Grove, Kentucky, was built in 1870. It was listed on the National Register of Historic Places in 1979.

It is a two-story five-bay brick building with elements of Greek Revival architecture.
