= Ethan Allen House and Gun Shop =

Historic house in Massachusetts, United States

- U.S. National Register of Historic Places
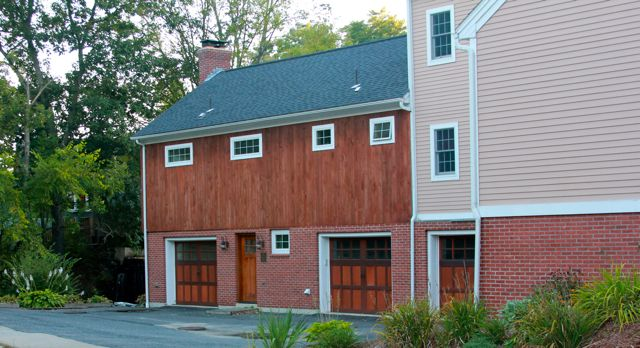

- Location within Massachusetts Location within the United States
- Location: 37 Waterville St., Grafton, Massachusetts
- Coordinates: 42°14′14″N 71°42′23″W
- Built: 1833
- Architectural style: Greek Revival
- NRHP reference No.: 95001167
- Added to NRHP: October 12, 1995

The Ethan Allen House and Gun Shop is an historic property at 37 Waterville Street in Grafton, Massachusetts. The property includes the home and business of armsmaker Ethan Allen. The gun shop was constructed in 1833, while the house was built in 1834–36. Allen, the inventor of the pepper-box revolver, began manufacturing guns in Grafton in 1832; his business was one of the earliest gunmakers in the region and an early part of Grafton's industrial development. Allen's home was a Greek Revival residence, an uncommon style in the area. The property was added to the National Register of Historic Places in 1995.

Ethan Allen (not to be confused with American Revolutionary War hero Ethan Allen), was a native of Bellingham, Massachusetts who came to Grafton in 1831, where he manufactured cutlery before entering the arms business. The land for the house and shop was acquired in partnership with his father in 1832, and purchased by him outright in 1837. When Allen began making guns, he dammed the brook near the shop site to provide water power to the facility. While working at this shop, Allen produced the first known example of an "underhammer" pistol, and the first self-cocking gun with a barrel that rotates when the trigger is pulled. His shop, in which he worked until moving to Norwich, Connecticut in 1842, is one of the only examples of an early 19th-century gunshop in the state.

== See also ==
- National Register of Historic Places listings in Worcester County, Massachusetts
