= James Allen House (Lexington, Kentucky) =

- Allen, James House
- U.S. National Register of Historic Places
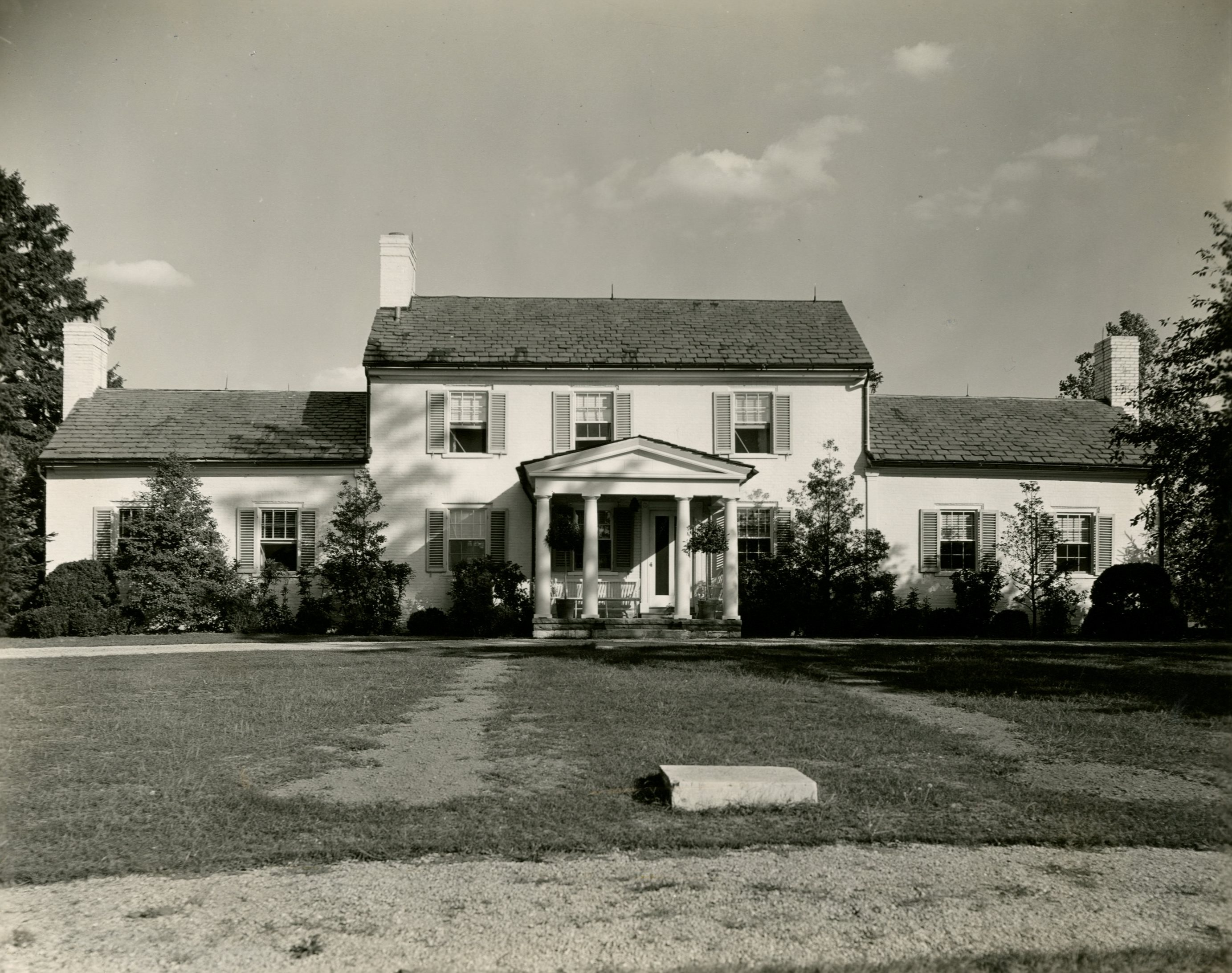
- The James Allen House in 1982

- Location within Kentucky Location within the United States
- Location: 1020 Lane Allen Rd., Lexington, Kentucky
- Coordinates: 38.032139°N 84.5550747°W
- Area: 5.9 acres (2.4 ha)
- Architectural style: Federal
- NRHP reference No.: 82001564
- Added to NRHP: December 30, 1982

The James Allen House, also known as Scarlet Gate, in Lexington, Kentucky, was the home of writer James Lane Allen. The house, originally a 2-story Federal design, dates from the 1790s, and in the original section numbered rafters are joined with wooden pegs. The south wing of the house had been constructed prior to arrival of the Allen family in 1851, and the north wing was added in the 1930s, over a large room constructed earlier in the 20th century. The James Allen House was listed on the National Register of Historic Places in 1982.

Allen described the house in his introduction to A Kentucky Cardinal, written in 1894 and published by Harper & Brothers in 1895, although he may not have lived in the house after 1872.

In 2011 The Lexington School purchased the Allen House and its surrounding 12.6 acres.
