= Dr. Peter Allen House =

Historic house in Ohio, United States

- U.S. National Register of Historic Places
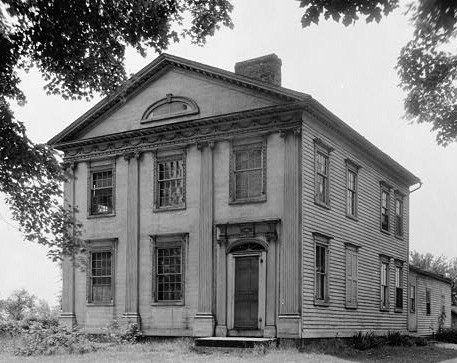
- Peter Allen House in 1936.

- Location within Ohio Location within the United States
- Location: 8581 State Street Kinsman, Ohio
- Nearest city: Kinsman, Ohio
- Coordinates: 41°27′19.04″N 80°35′40.29″W
- Built: 1821
- Architect: Will Smith
- Architectural style: Federal and Other
- NRHP reference No.: 71000653
- Added to NRHP: 1971-09-03

Dr. Peter Allen House is a registered historic building near Kinsman, Ohio, listed in the National Register on 1971-09-03. It currently operates as the Peter Allen Inn & Event Center, a small inn and wedding venue.

== History ==
The Peter Allen House was built by architect Willis Smith in 1821 for Kinsman doctor Peter Allen. In 1808, Peter Allen relocated to Kinsman. He would later become the town's first medical doctor.

In addition, architect Smith built the Kinsman Presbyterian Church, as well as several other buildings around the Kinsman community. Smith also built the home for John Kinsman, for whom the township is named. The home originally cost $3,000 on a $2-an-acre lot.

Allen became a skilled surgeon during the War of 1812. Allen first married in 1813 to Charity Dudley, who died in a runaway carriage accident in 1840. He would later marry Fanny Starr, the niece of General Simon Perkins.

At an unspecified date, Allen and his family moved to Oberlin. The house was then purchased by the Reverend James Plant. In 1903, the grandson of Peter Allen, Dr. Dudley Allen, negotiated with the Plant family descendants and purchased the woodwork from the parlor and had it transferred to Cleveland to be used for two separate homes. When the second home, built by Dudley Allen, was torn down the fittings were stored at the Western Reserve Historical Society until replaced after 51 years in the original Kinsman home.

== Preservation efforts ==
Over time, the property changed hands.

Restoring the property was greatly furthered by an initiative during the Great Depression. The Works Progress Administration sent draftsmen across the country to document historic structures, including the Allen house. Years later, preservation projects on the Peter Allen House continued.

In 1938, the building was listed in the Library of Congress. During the 1970s, only three families had occupied the Peter Allen House. Mrs. Alice Blaemire purchased the house sometime during the 20th century, opening it up as a tea room and for private dinners and parties.

== Current status ==
Richard Thompson and his wife, Rhonda, purchased the property in 2008, with aspirations in mind to preserve its history, but add a new chapter to it. The Business Journal reported; "Thompson is a founding partner and owner of Therm-O-Link Inc., an electrical wire and cable manufacturer with plants in Warren, Garrettsville and Texas. When he stepped down from active operations of the company in 1993, he turned to farming. He had started his Kinsman farm as a hobby when his son graduated from high school in the mid-1990s and decided to pursue agriculture as a career."

Previously, the Thompson's purchased Peter Allen's home from the Alice Blaemire estate. Soon after purchasing the property, in 2010, the couple started the Richard and Rhonda Thompson Foundation. The foundation would focus primarily on the restoration and preservation of historic structures.

In 2016, the Peter Allen House opened as the Peter Allen Inn & Event Center. The home has hosted weddings, bridal and baby showers, bereavement dinners, reunions, corporate retreats and a prom for a local charter school.
