= Darlon Allen House =

Historic house in Ohio, United States

- U.S. National Register of Historic Places
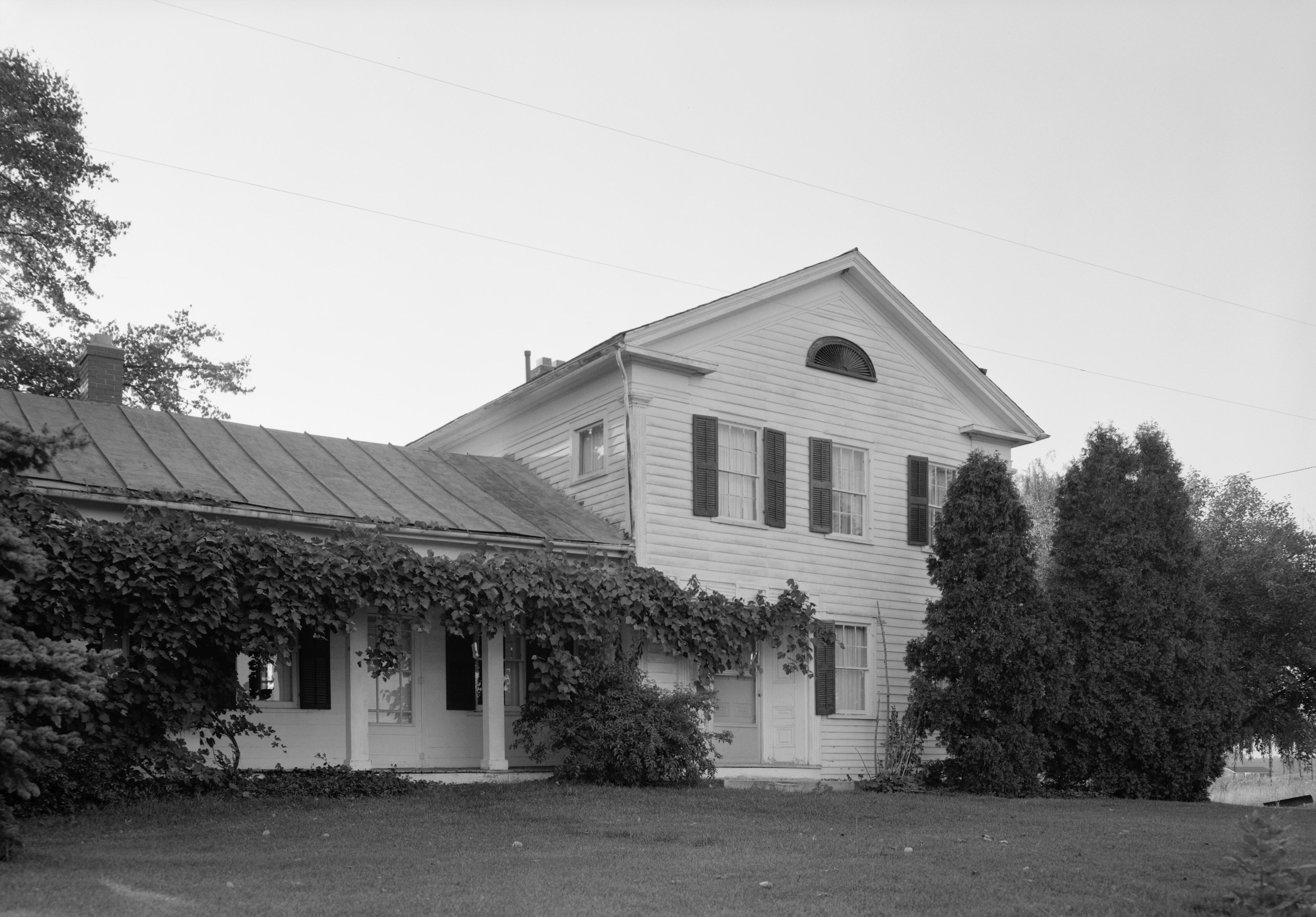
- Front of the house, seen after restoration

- Location within Ohio Location within the United States
- Location: State Route 58 in Huntington Township
- Nearest city: Wellington, Ohio
- Coordinates: 41°6′46″N 82°13′12″W
- Area: 5 acres (2.0 ha)
- Built: 1830
- Architectural style: Greek Revival
- MPS: Wellington-Huntington Road MRA
- NRHP reference No.: 79003877
- Added to NRHP: June 15, 1979

The Darlon Allen House is a historic residence located near Wellington in southern Lorain County, Ohio, United States. One of the most significant farmhouses in an area known for its historically important architecture, it has been named a historic site.

Built with weatherboarded walls, the Allen House rests on a brick foundation and is covered with a metal roof. Its basic plan features two large components: a single-story section with a covered porch, and a partially pedimented two-story section. Doors are set in both sections, with shuttered windows occupying much of the remaining wall space; the two-story section is divided into three bays by the door and windows, while the single-story section features spaces for three windows in addition to its door. Smaller features include narrow columns supporting the porch roof and a fanlight in the gable of the two-story section.

Constructed in 1830, the Darlon Allen House was built by a carpenter named Orlando Barker; among the other owners have been R.A. Horr, a Mr. Dirlam, and E.R. Allen. By the 1930s, the house had been permitted to decline greatly, but after it first gained attention from a historic site survey, the owners began to restore it. The house was the subject of a Historic American Buildings Survey (HABS) study in 1937, and HABS photographer Jack Boucher documented it in 1971.

For many years, the road between Huntington Center and Wellington (now State Route 58) has possessed a reputation of architectural distinction: numerous Greek Revival farmhouses from the mid-19th century still stand on both sides of the road, giving it a historically unique built environment. Along with many of their outbuildings, these houses are among the region's best Greek Revival buildings, due in part to the area's early prosperity and long decline: after growing rapidly in its early years, Huntington Township declined after 1850, and the remaining residents continued using their older buildings instead of building new ones. In 1979, many of the houses on State Route 58 south of Wellington were listed on the National Register of Historic Places via a multiple property submission. The Allen House was among these, qualifying both because of its place in the area's history and because of its historically significant architecture; it was included because of its exceptional degree of preservation, even when compared to the other houses in this exceptionally well-preserved stretch of road. Two agricultural outbuildings were included in the designation, as well as the main house.
