= James Lane Allen =

American novelist (1849–1925)

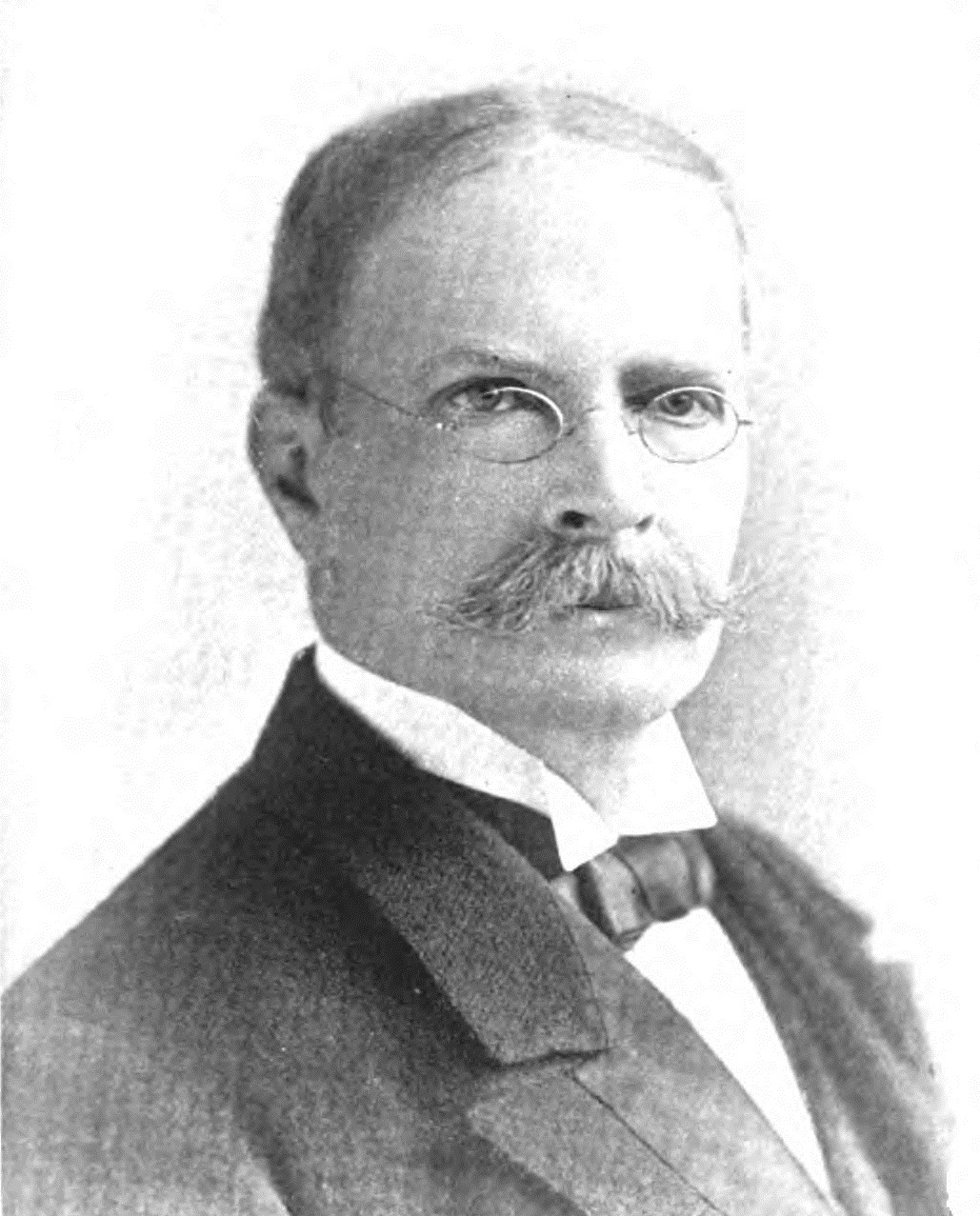
- Born: December 21, 1849; Lexington, Kentucky
- Died: February 18, 1925 (aged 75); New York, New York
- Resting place: Lexington Cemetery
- Occupations: Novelist, short story writer, teacher

Signature
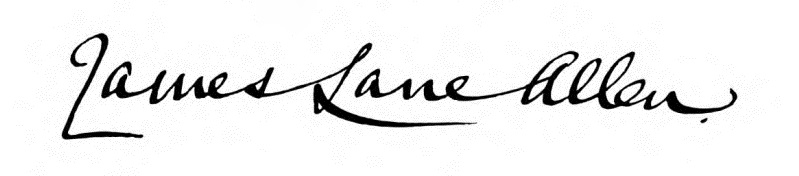

James Lane Allen (December 21, 1849 – February 18, 1925) was an American novelist and short story writer whose work, including the novel A Kentucky Cardinal, often depicted the culture and dialects of his native Kentucky. His work is characteristic of the late 19th-century local color era, when writers sought to capture the vernacular in their fiction. Allen has been described as "Kentucky's first important novelist".

== Early life and education ==
James Lane Allen was born near Lexington, Kentucky, to Richard and Helen Jane (Foster) Allen on December 21, 1849. Allen, the youngest child in the family, had four sisters Lydia, May, Sally, and Annie, and two brothers, John and Henry. Allen lived at the Scarlet Gate estate in Lexington in the late 1800s until age 22 years.

In 1872, Allen graduated from the University of Kentucky, Lexington, taught at Fort Spring, Kentucky, at Richmond and at Lexington, Missouri, and from 1877 to 1879 at the academy of the University of Kentucky, where he was principal and taught modern languages. In 1880, he was professor of Latin and English at Bethany College (West Virginia); and then became head of a private school at Lexington, Kentucky. Allen spent his youth in Lexington during the Antebellum era, the American Civil War, and the Reconstruction periods. His childhood heavily influenced his writing. He described living at Scarlet Gate in the introduction to A Kentucky Cardinal.

== Career in New York ==
In 1893, Allen moved to New York City, where he lived until his death. He was a contributor to Harper's Magazine, The Atlantic Monthly, and other popular magazines of the time. His novels include The Choir Invisible, which was a popular best seller in 1897.

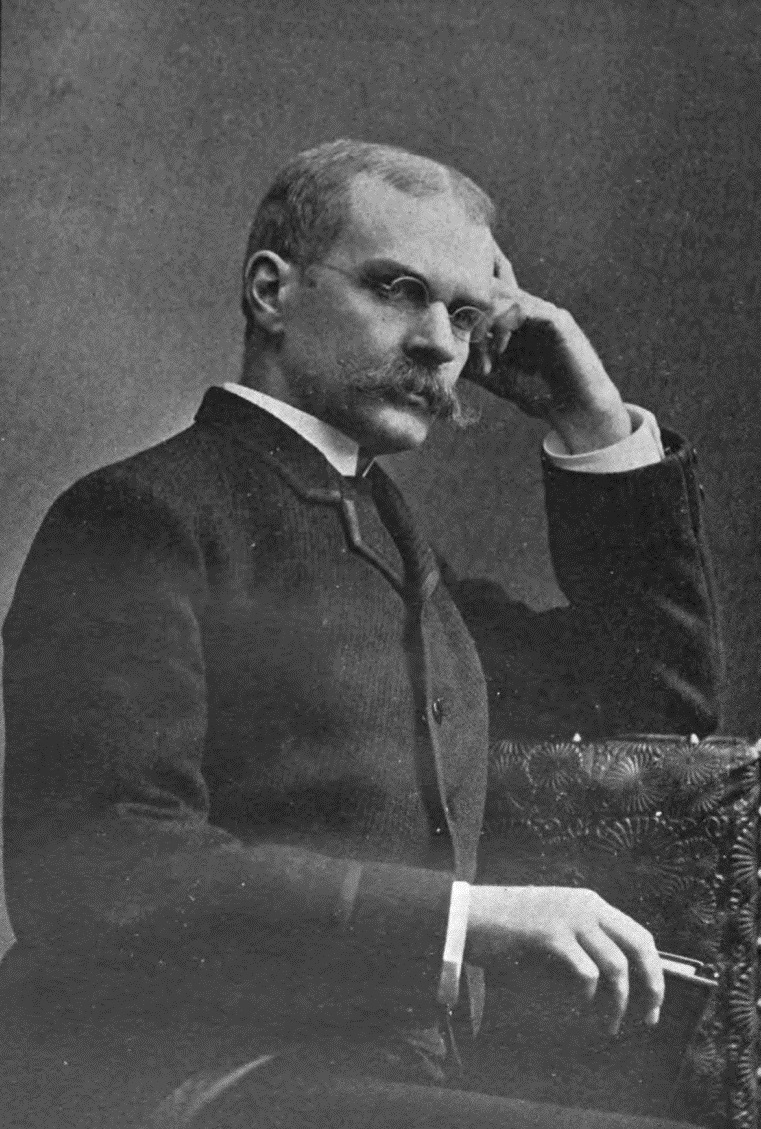
Photo of Allen (c. 1894)

== Death and legacy ==
Allen died "from insomnia" in 1925, and is buried in Lexington Cemetery. At the northern edge of Gratz Park in Lexington is the "Fountain of Youth", built in memory of Allen using proceeds willed to the city by him.

James Lane Allen School, an elementary school off Alexandria Drive in Lexington, Kentucky is named in his honor.

== Bibliography ==
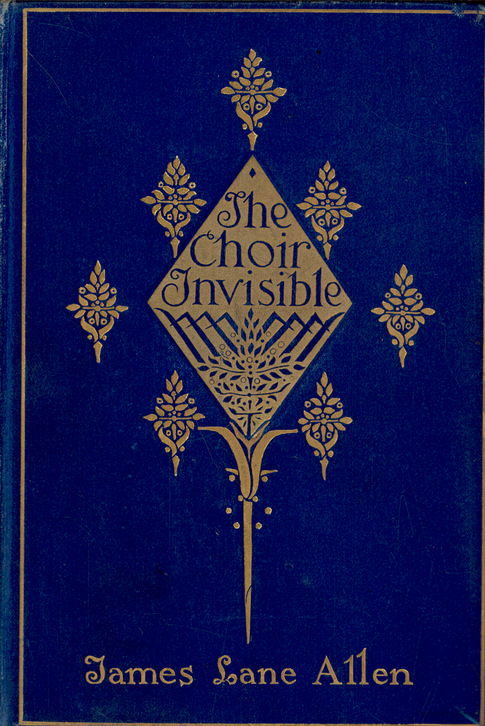
First edition cover of The Choir Invisible (1897)

Works published by Allen include:

- Flute and Violin (1891) (compilation of previously published stories)
- The Blue-Grass Region of Kentucky (1892) (second compilation)
- Sister Dolorosa, and Posthumous Fame (1892)
- John Gray (1893)
- A Kentucky Cardinal (1894)
- Aftermath (1895) (sequel to A Kentucky Cardinal)
- Summer in Arcady (1896)
- The Choir Invisible (1897)
- Two Gentlemen of Kentucky (1899)
- Out from the heart (1900)
- The Increasing Purpose (1900)
- The Reign of Law (1900)
- The Mettle of the Pasture (1903)
- The Bride of the Mistletoe (1909)
- The Doctor's Christmas Eve (1910)
- The Heroine in Bronze (1912)
- The Last Christmas Tree (1914)
- The Sword of Youth (1915)
- A Cathedral Singer (1916)
- The Kentucky Warbler (1918)
- The Emblems of Fidelity (1919)
- The Alabaster Box (1923)
- The Landmark (1925)
