= Abram Allen House =

Historic house in Wisconsin, United States

- U.S. National Register of Historic Places
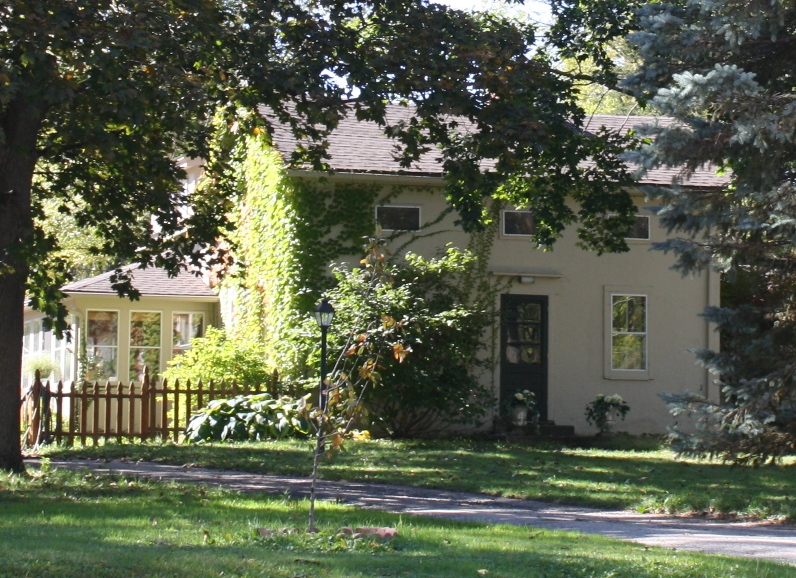

- Location within Wisconsin Location within the United States
- Location: 205 East Madison Ave. Milton, Wisconsin
- Coordinates: 42°46′45″N 88°56′54″W
- Area: less than one acre
- Built: 1853
- Built by: Abram Allen
- Architectural style: Vernacular Greek Revival
- MPS: Grout Buildings in Milton TR
- NRHP reference No.: 78003386
- Added to NRHP: September 13, 1978

The Abram Allen House is a historic house with walls of grout, built about 1853 in Milton, Wisconsin. It was added to the National Register of Historic Places in 1978.

== Description and history ==
The Abram house is a 1 1/2-story building, approximately 25 feet (7.6 m) by 18 feet (5.5 m), with walls composed of monolithic grout. It is designed in the Vernacular Greek Revival style. It was completed in 1853 and was built by early settler Abram Allen (1799-1875) on a limestone foundation, and sold by him soon after.
