= Elisha Allen House =

Historic house in Massachusetts, United States

- U.S. National Register of Historic Places
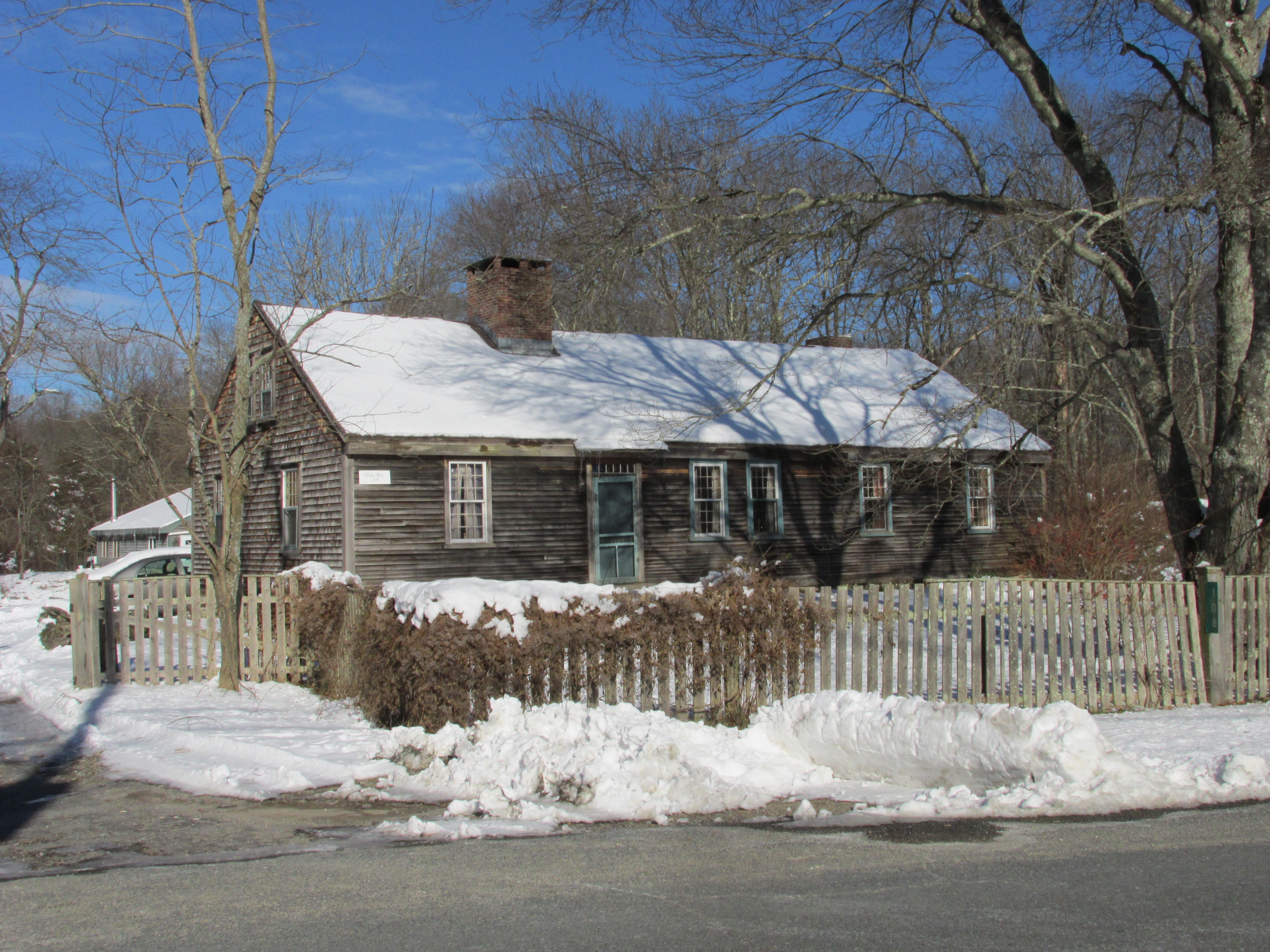
- Elisha Allen House

- Location within Massachusetts Location within the United States
- Location: 108 Homestead Ave., Rehoboth, Massachusetts
- Coordinates: 41°52′51″N 71°16′9″W
- Built: 1738
- Architectural style: Georgian
- MPS: Rehoboth MRA
- NRHP reference No.: 83000616
- Added to NRHP: June 6, 1983

The Elisha Allen House is a historic house located at 108 Homestead Avenue in Rehoboth, Massachusetts.

== Description and history ==
The oldest portion of this 1 1/2-story, Cape style house was built between 1738 and 1759, and is one of the oldest and least-altered structures in the town. A rear ell was added between 1775 and 1825, and a new kitchen wing was added in about 1830 to the east end. The original house was probably built by Deacon Ezekiel Read or his son, Ezekiel Jr. The house was in the hands of the Allen family from 1759 to 1895.

The house was listed on the National Register of Historic Places on June 6, 1983.

== See also ==
- National Register of Historic Places listings in Bristol County, Massachusetts
