= Henry Allen House =

Historic house in New York, United States

- U.S. National Register of Historic Places
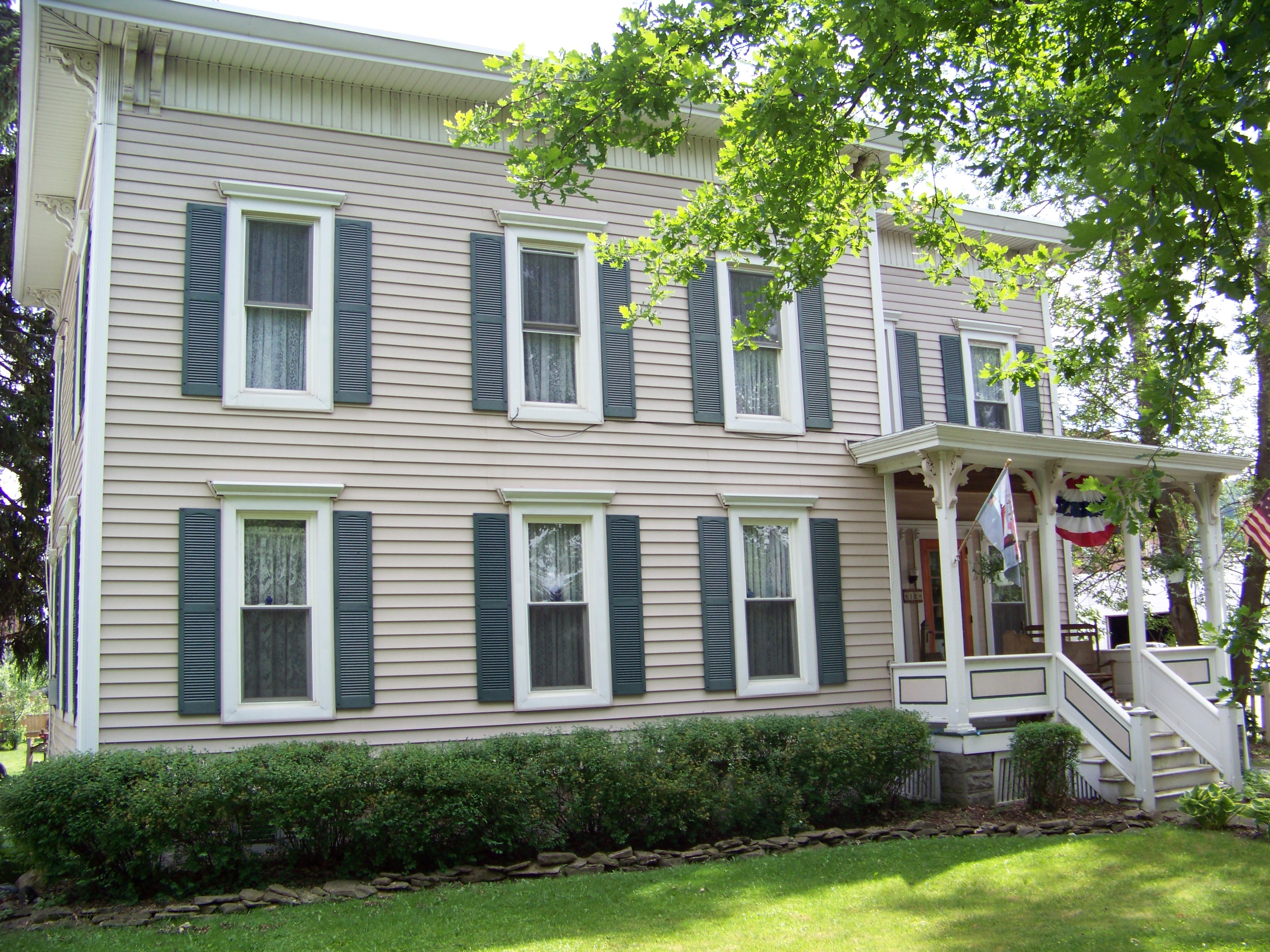

- Location within New York Location within the United States
- Location: 12 E. Cayuga St., Moravia, New York
- Coordinates: 42°42′47″N 76°25′16″W
- Area: less than one acre
- Built: 1877
- Architectural style: Italianate
- MPS: Moravia MPS
- NRHP reference No.: 95000060
- Added to NRHP: February 24, 1995

The Henry Allen House is a historic house located in the village of Moravia, Cayuga County, New York.

== Description and history ==
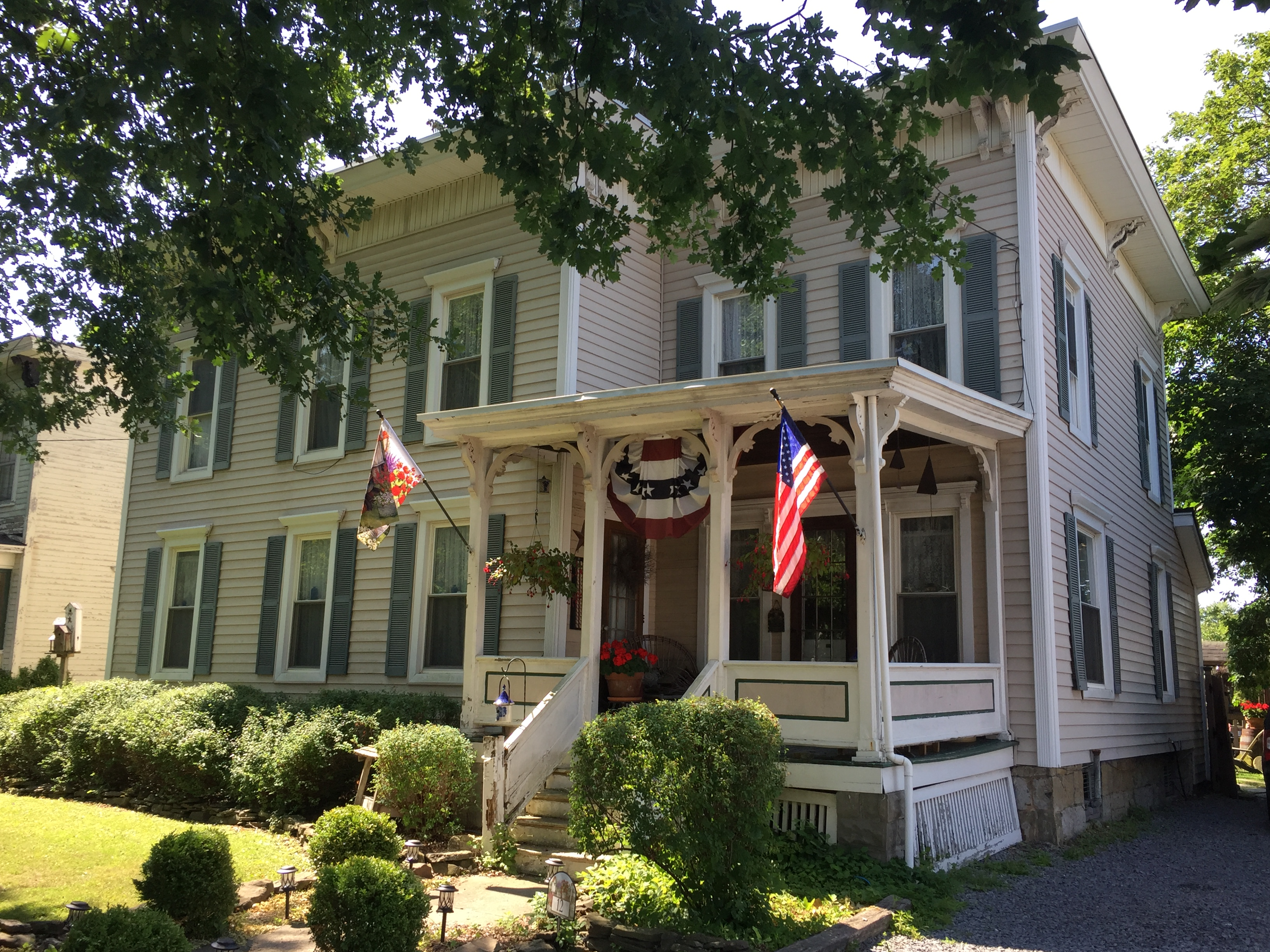
House in 2022

It is a two-story, frame residence constructed in the Italianate style. The house was built in about 1877.

It was listed on the National Register of Historic Places on February 24, 1995.
