= Lyman Allen House and Barn =

Historic house in Ohio, United States

- U.S. National Register of Historic Places
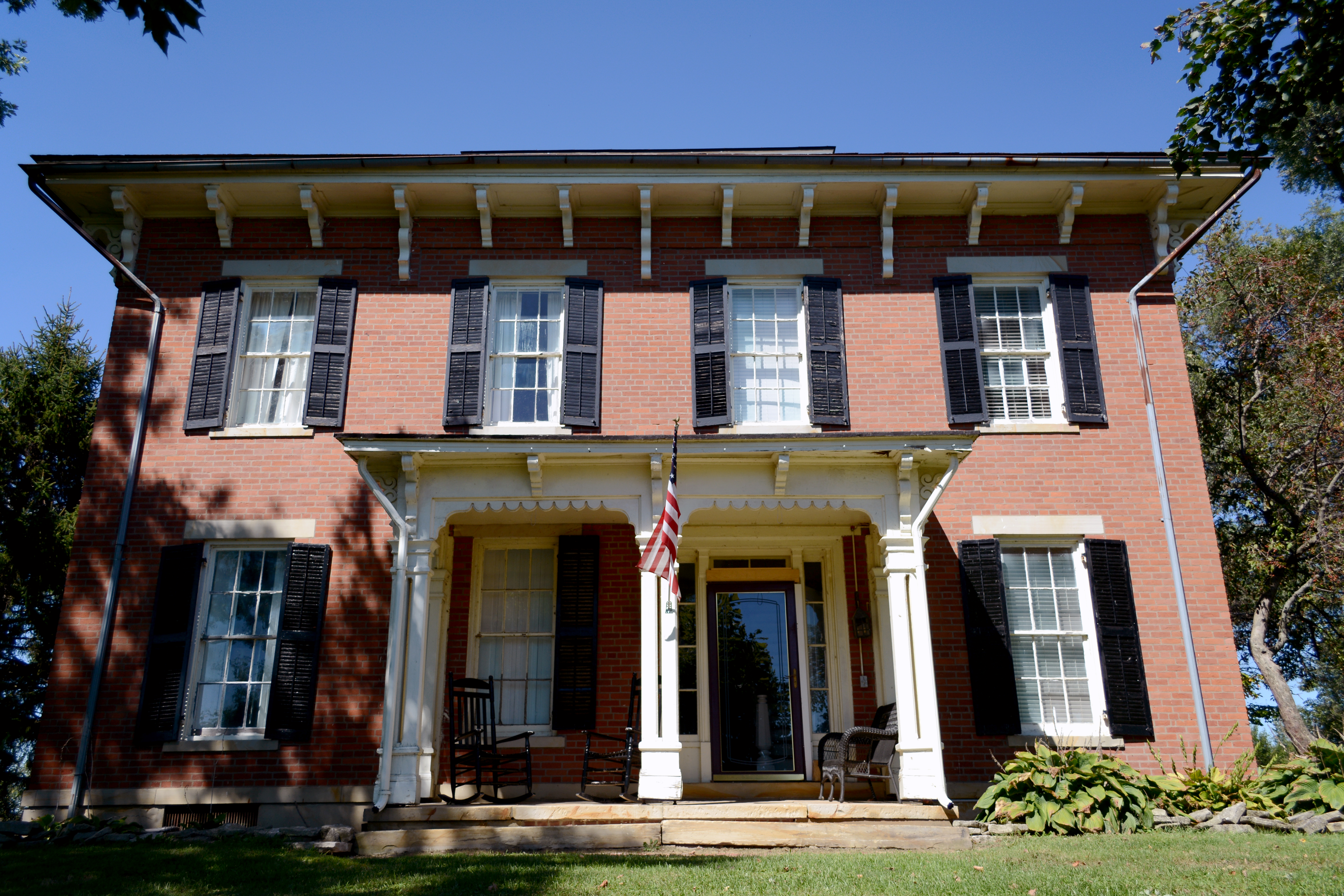

- Location within Ohio Location within the United States
- Nearest city: Amanda, Ohio
- Coordinates: 39°41′48″N 82°47′40″W
- NRHP reference No.: 76001420
- Added to NRHP: 1976-11-18

Lyman Allen House and Barn is a registered historic building near Amanda, Ohio, listed in the National Register on 1976-11-18.

== Historic uses ==
- Single Dwelling
- Secondary Structure
