= B. M. Allen House =

Historic house in Kentucky, United States

- U.S. National Register of Historic Places
- Location within Kentucky Location within the United States
- Location: 11301 Riddles Run Rd., Union, Kentucky
- Coordinates: 38°54′52″N 84°48′00″W
- Area: 75 acres (30 ha)
- Architectural style: Greek Revival, Italianate
- MPS: Boone County MRA
- NRHP reference No.: 88003290
- Added to NRHP: February 6, 1989

The B. M. Allen House, in Boone County, Kentucky near Union, is a house with Greek Revival and Italianate features. It was listed on the National Register of Historic Places in 1989, and the listing then included seven contributing buildings on 75 acres (30 ha).

It is one of 34 I-houses which then survived in the county, and was deemed a good example.
