= A Kentucky Cardinal =

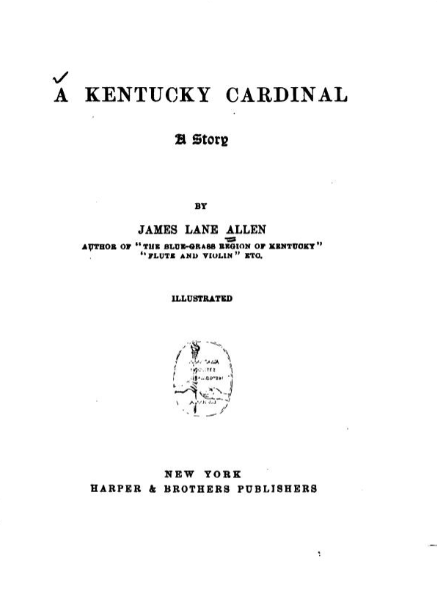
- Title page for A Kentucky Cardinal (1894)
- Author: James Lane Allen
- Series: A Kentucky Cardinal
- Published: Harper & Brothers Publishers, 1894

A Kentucky Cardinal is American writer James Lane Allen's third novel. It was published in 1894 as the first of the A Kentucky Cardinal series.

- A Kentucky Cardinal (1894)
- Aftermath (1895) (sequel to A Kentucky Cardinal)

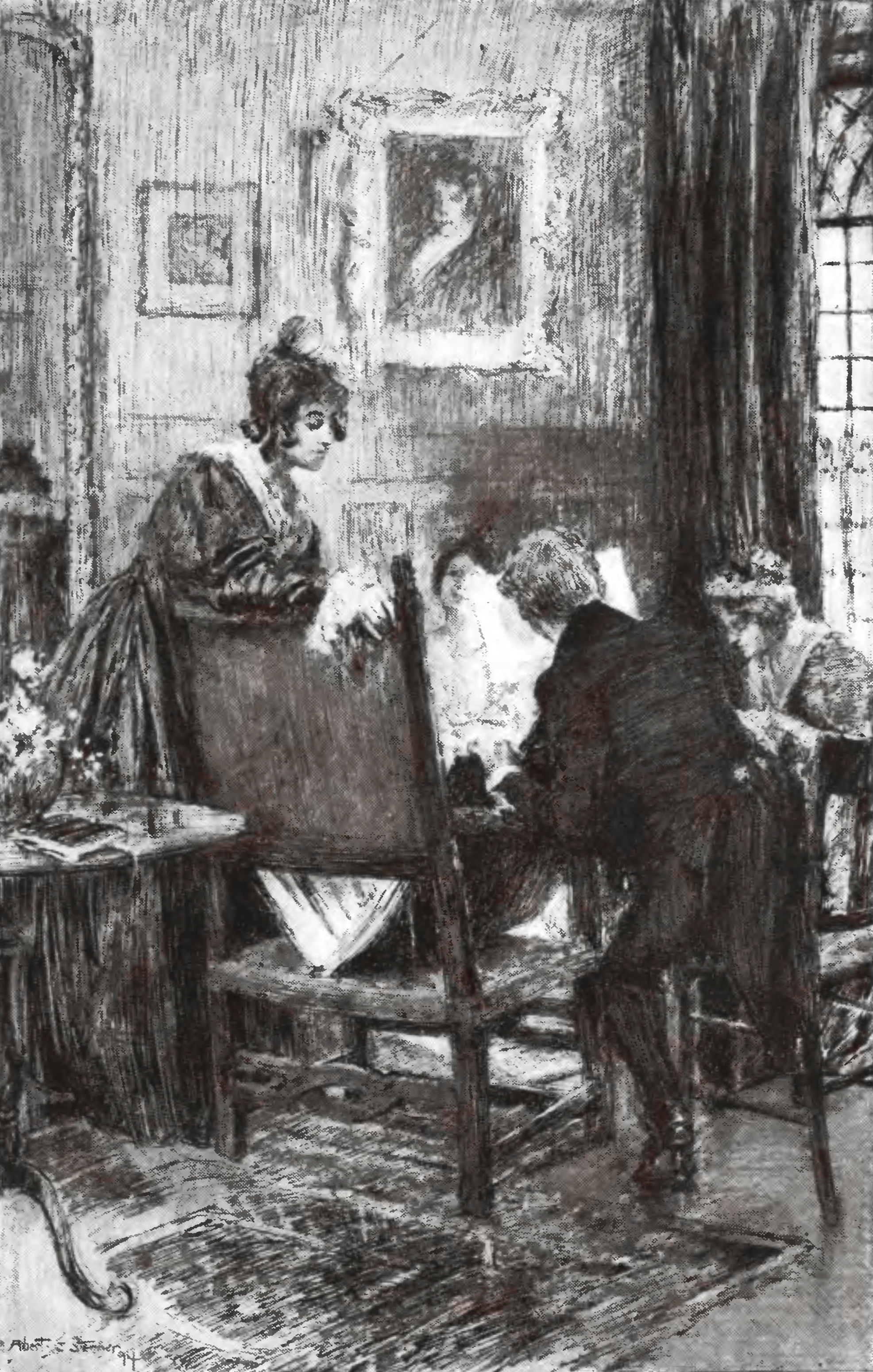
"The Audubon Drawings" illustration on page viii of A Kentucky Cardinal

A Kentucky Cardinal is set in rural Kentucky and focuses on the introspective experiences of a naturalist as he observes the changing seasons, the habits of birds and other wildlife, and his interactions with neighbors and community life. The novel's vivid descriptions of nature and its contemplative pace reflect themes of beauty, solitude, and the moral significance of human connection within the landscape of post‑Civil War Kentucky.
