= Allen-Barringer House =

Historic house in Louisiana, United States

- U.S. National Register of Historic Places
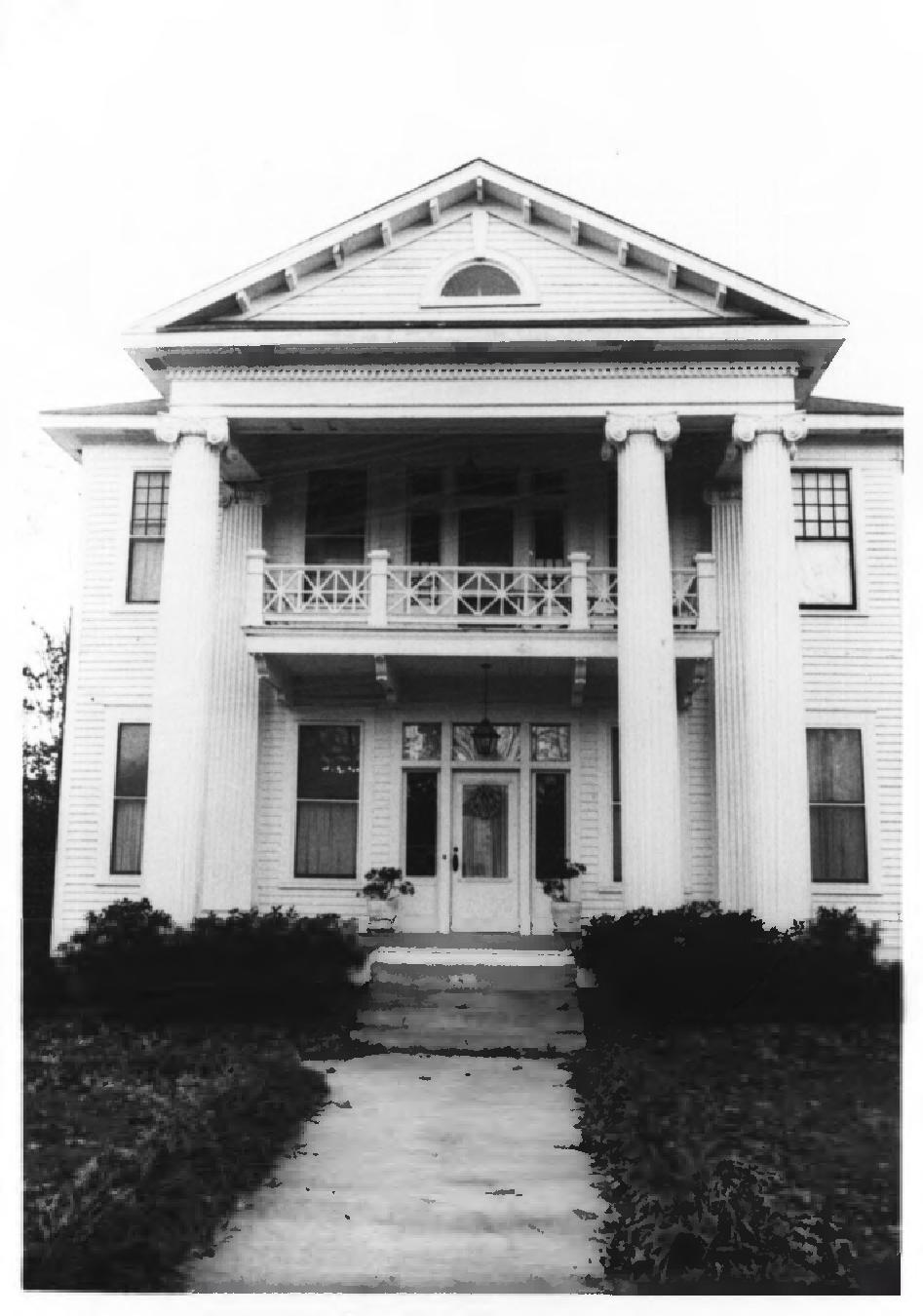
- Allen-Barringer House in December 1981

- Location within Louisiana Location within the United States
- Location: Off Elkins Rd. about 7 miles (11 km) southwest of West Monroe, Louisiana
- Coordinates: 32°25′33″N 92°11′39″W
- Area: 0.2 acres (0.081 ha)
- Built: c.1906
- Built by: Allen, W.E.
- Architect: Drago, William
- Architectural style: Colonial Revival, Queen Anne Revival
- NRHP reference No.: 82002790
- Added to NRHP: May 3, 1982

The Allen-Barringer House, now located about 7 miles (11 km) southwest of West Monroe, Louisiana, was built in around 1906 in the town of Monroe LA. It was moved to its present location near West Monroe LA in 1973 in order to save the house. The house was listed on the National Register of Historic Places in 1982.

The house has Colonial Revival and Queen Anne Revival features. In the move the original chimneys were lost and replaced, and one of its four Ionic columns of its portico was missing, but the house was deemed to have good historical integrity.
