= The Choir Invisible =

1897 novel by James Lane Allen

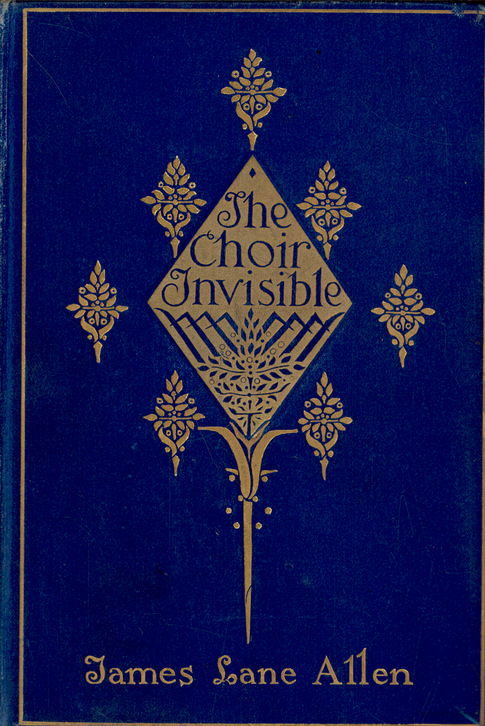
- 1897 book cover
- Author: James Lane Allen
- Language: English
- Genre: Novel
- Publisher: Macmillan
- Publication date: April 1897
- Publication place: United States
- Media type: Print (Hardcover)
- Pages: 361 pp

The Choir Invisible is a novel by James Lane Allen published in 1897. A bestseller, it was the second-best selling book in the United States for 1897.

A poignant love story, it is set in Kentucky in 1795 and begins with a portion of the poem "The Choir Invisible" by George Eliot. Although criticized for lacking depth, being full of digressions, and "artistically disappointing", it was his most popular novel. An 1897 review in The Atlantic Monthly faulted the book for its "meagre" structure, yet praised its tone and style. The book is often regarded as Allen's best work.

The novel was developed from a novelette Allen published in 1893 titled "John Gray: A Kentucky Tale of the Olden Time".
