= Willis Allen House =

Historic house in Illinois, United States

- U.S. National Register of Historic Places
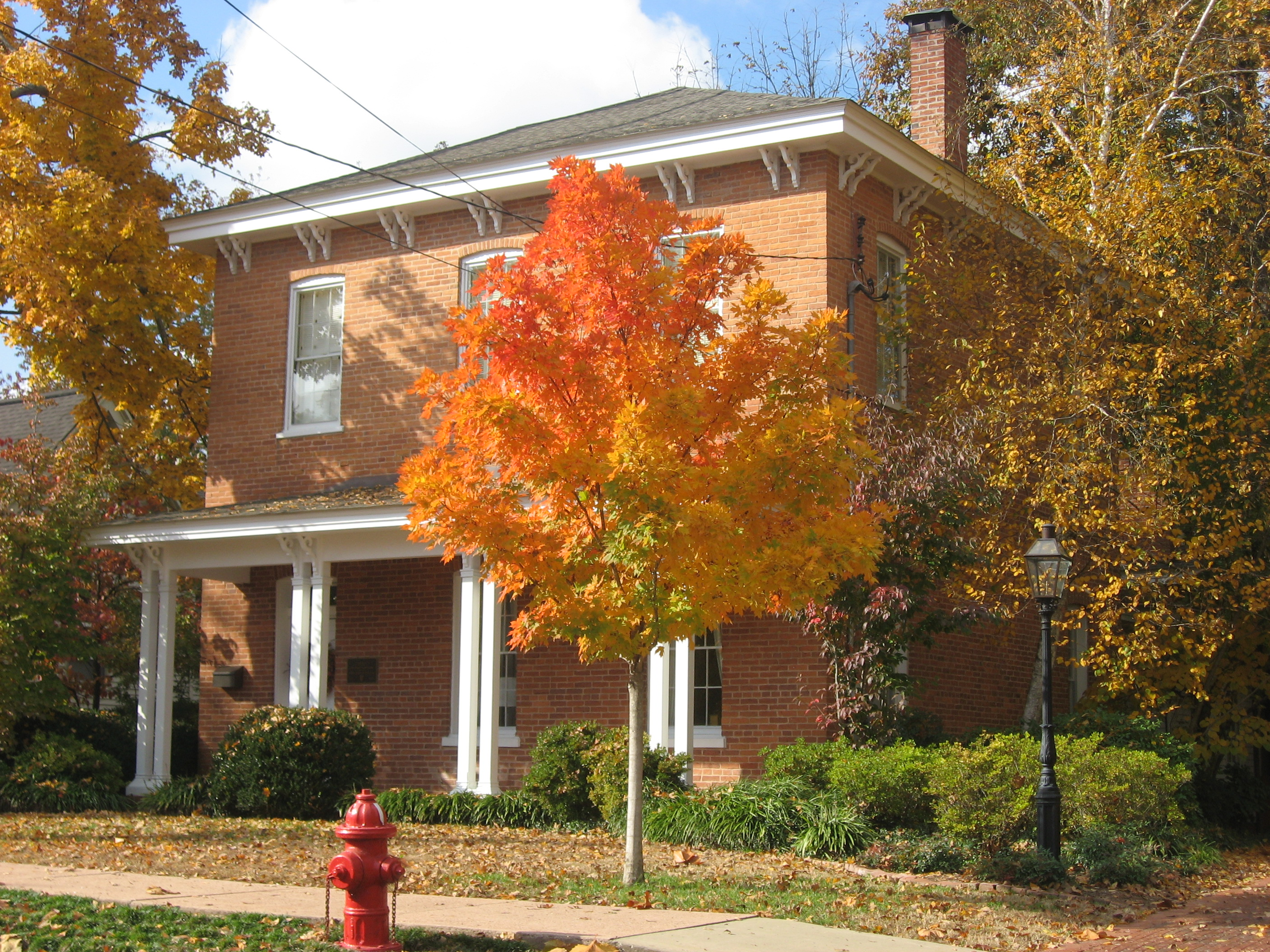

- Location within Illinois Location within the United States
- Location: 514 S. Market St., Marion, Illinois
- Coordinates: 37°43′36″N 88°55′39″W
- Area: less than one acre
- Built: 1854
- Architectural style: Italianate
- NRHP reference No.: 82002606
- Added to NRHP: February 11, 1982

The Willis Allen House is a historic house located at 514 S. Market St. in Marion, Illinois. Built in 1854, the house is the oldest remaining in Marion. The house was built for U.S. Representative Willis Allen, the first member of the House from Williamson County. Allen, who settled in Marion in 1830, served in the House from 1851 to 1855; he was also a lawyer, judge, local politician, and Illinois Senator. The house is a two-story Italianate residence built from brick and sandstone. The hip roof of the house features a cornice with cavetto moldings and Tudor arched brackets.

The house was added to the National Register of Historic Places on February 11, 1982.
