= G. W. S. Allen House =

Historic house in Iowa, United States

- U.S. National Register of Historic Places
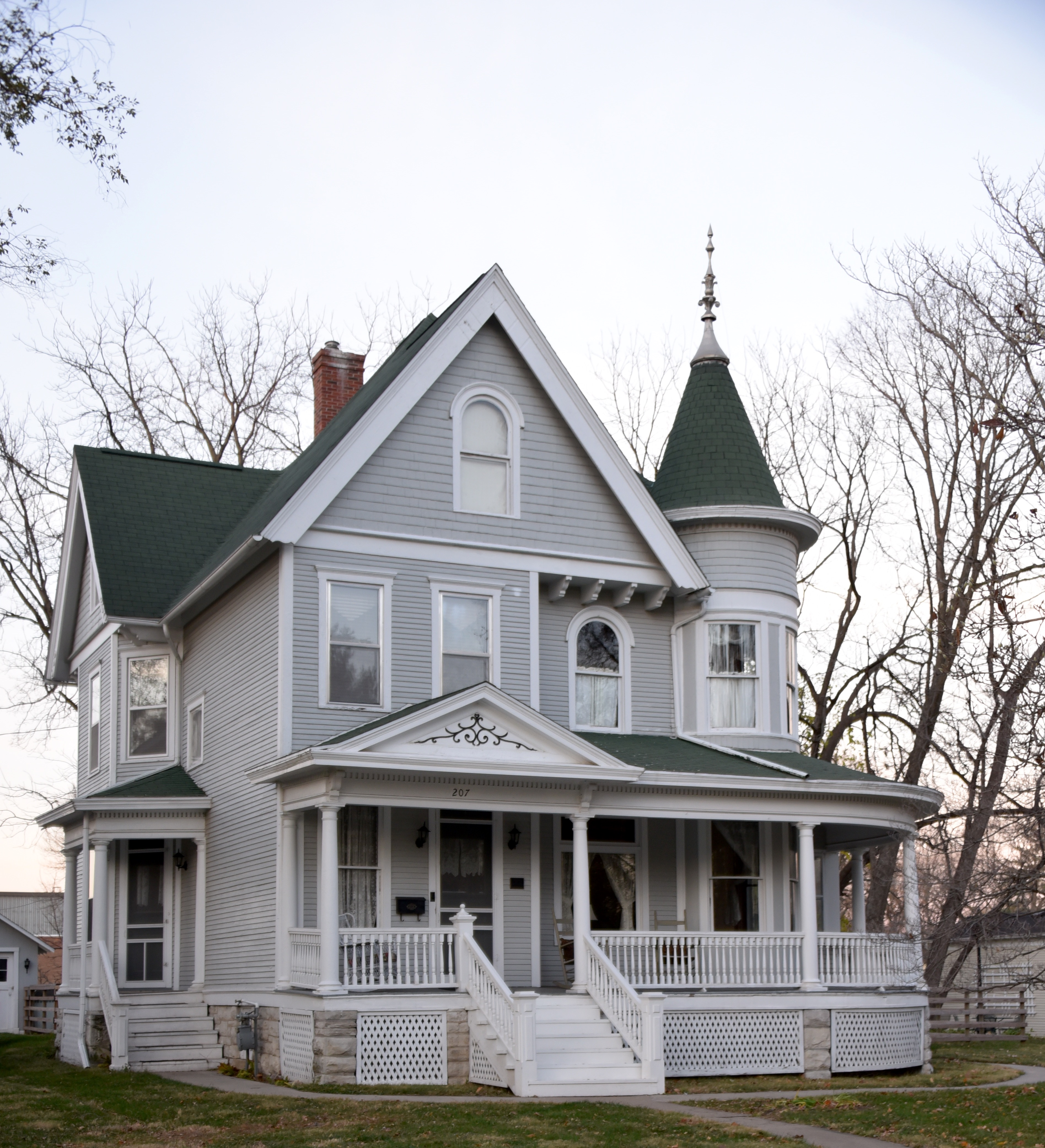

- Location within Iowa Location within the United States
- Location: 207 E. Henry St., Mount Pleasant, Iowa
- Coordinates: 40°58′07.5″N 91°33′00.9″W
- Area: less than one acre
- Built: 1900
- Architect: George F. Barber & Co.
- Architectural style: Queen Anne
- NRHP reference No.: 85000721
- Added to NRHP: April 11, 1985

The G. W. S. Allen House is a historic house located at 207 East Henry Street in Mount Pleasant, Iowa.

== Description and history ==
It was constructed according to mail order plans provided by George F. Barber & Co. of Knoxville, Tennessee. The final design is a combination of two designs offered in Barber's 1899 catalog and modifications by the Allens and their builder. It was one of several Barber-designed houses in Mount Pleasant. The 2½-story Queen Anne has an irregular plan, frame construction, a full basement, hip roof with lower cross gables, and circular tower with a conical roof. Because the house is from the later stage of the Queen Anne style it features decorative elements from the Neoclassical and the Neocolonial styles instead of Eastlake detailing. The house was built by George S.W. Allen, a Vermont native, who operated his own clothing store.

It was listed on the National Register of Historic Places on April 11, 1985.
