= Zachariah Allen House =

Historic house in Rhode Island, United States

- U.S. National Register of Historic Places
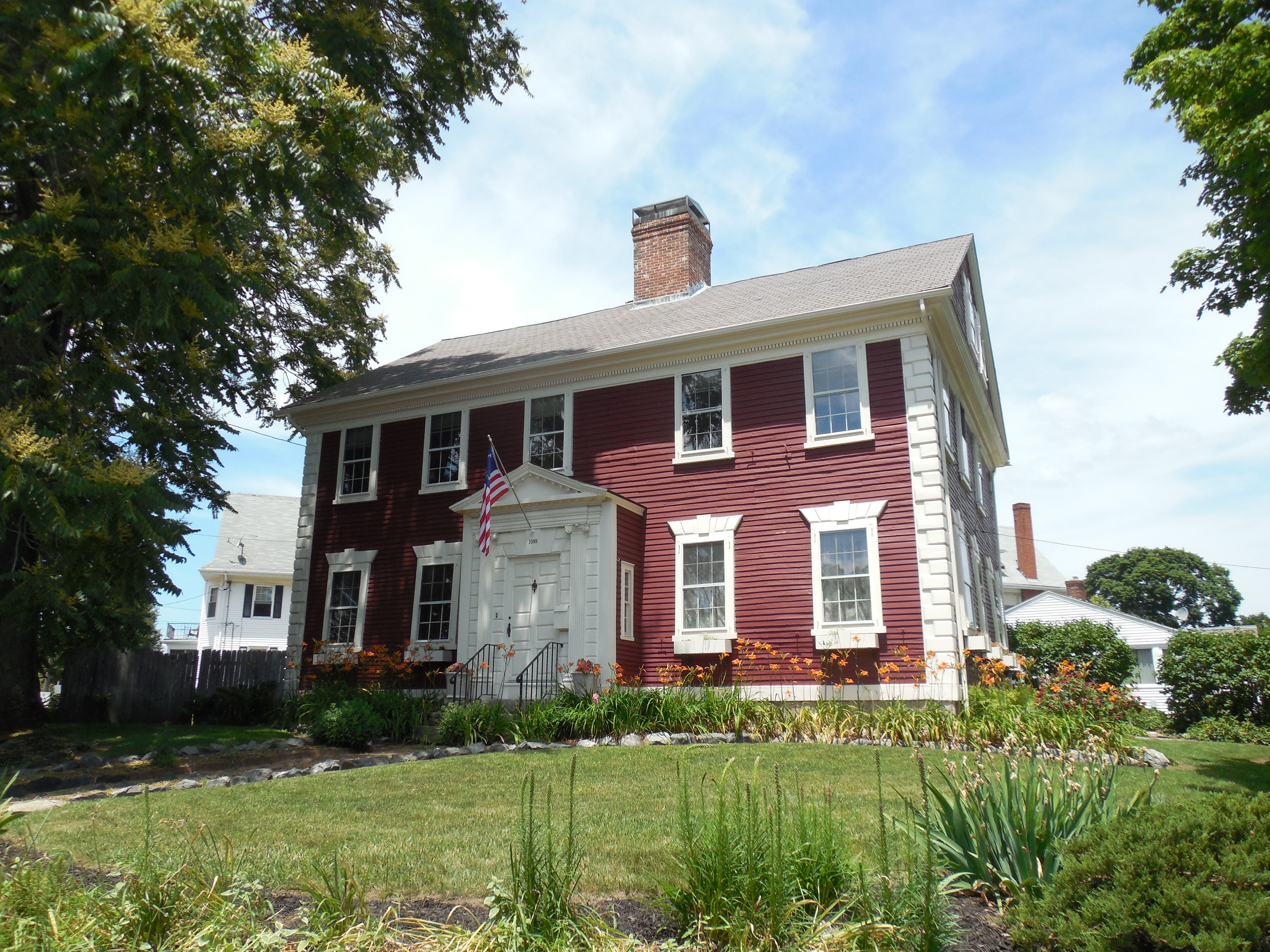
- Zachariah Allen House

- Location within Rhode Island Location within the United States
- Location: Providence, Rhode Island
- Coordinates: 41°50′39″N 71°26′56″W
- Built: 1789
- Architect: Allen, Amos
- Architectural style: Georgian, Federal
- NRHP reference No.: 94001152
- Added to NRHP: September 15, 1994

The Zachariah Allen House is a historic house at 1093 Smith Street in Providence, Rhode Island. Built in 1789 by Amos Allen for his brother Zachariah Allen, it is a 2 1/2-story wood-frame structure, five bays wide, with a central entry and large central chimney. It is a well-preserved example of a transitional Georgian-Federal style house, having retained original siding materials on the outside, and finish woodwork on the interior. Its major modifications include the 20th-century installation of new hardwood floors, as well as modern plumbing and kitchen. Zachariah Allen was at the time a successful merchant, and the house was built as a summer retreat in what was at the time a rural area.

The building was listed on the National Register of Historic Places in 1994.

== See also ==
- National Register of Historic Places listings in Providence, Rhode Island
