= Carnegie Library (Boulder, Colorado) =

- U.S. National Register of Historic Places
- Colorado State Register of Historic Properties
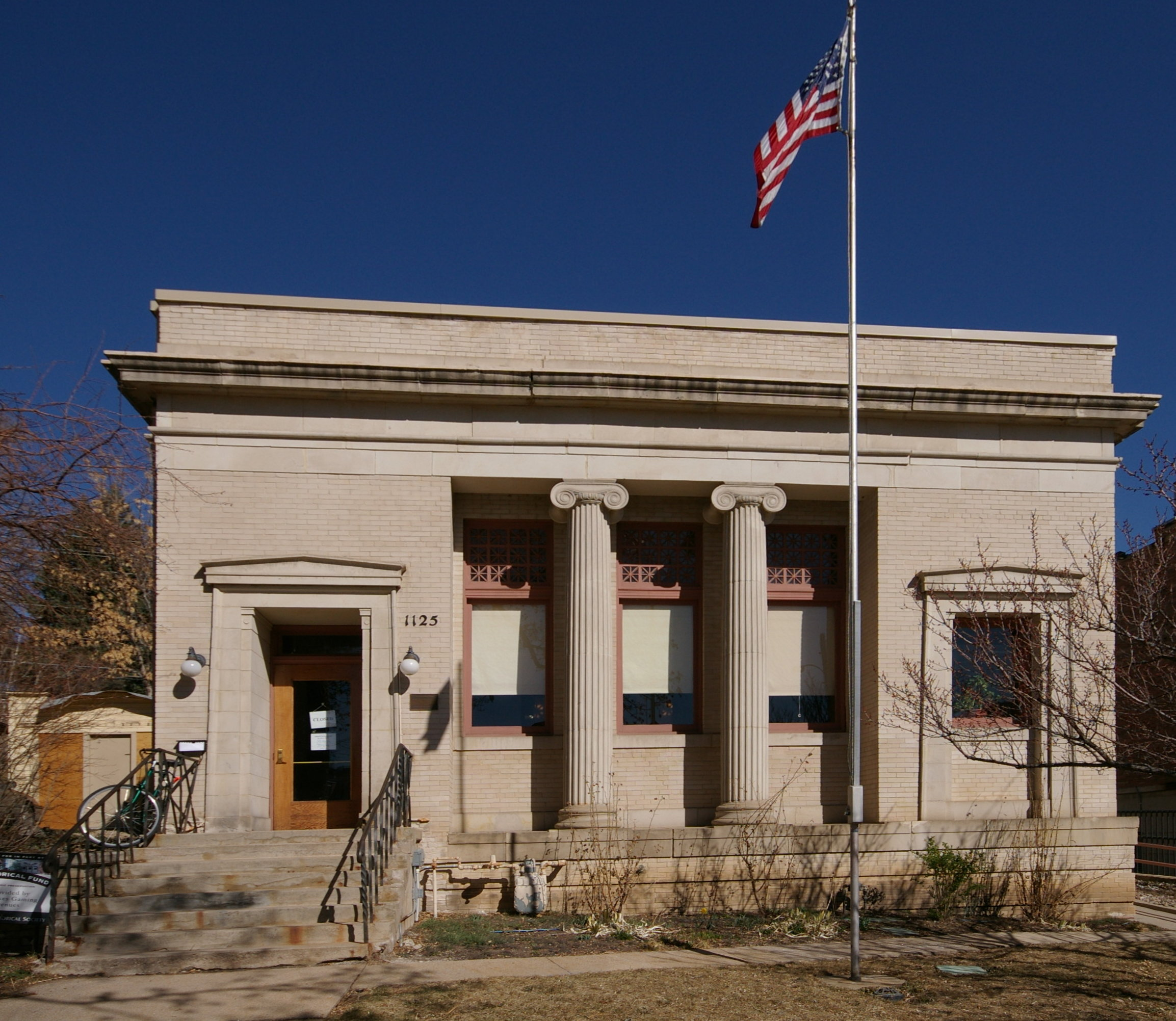

- Location within Colorado Location within the United States
- Location: 1125 Pine St., Boulder, Colorado
- Coordinates: 40°1′12″N 105°16′52″W
- Area: 0.2 acres (0.081 ha)
- Built: 1906
- Architect: McLaren, Thomas
- Architectural style: Classical Revival
- NRHP reference No.: 79000573
- CSRHP No.: 5BL.365
- Added to NRHP: February 16, 1979

The Carnegie Library in Boulder, Colorado is a building from 1906. It was listed on the National Register of Historic Places in 1979. The building is now known as the Carnegie Library for Local History, and is a branch of the Boulder Public Library. The library contains an area of 4,000 square feet (370 m^{2}).
