= Boulder Public Library =

Public library in Boulder, Colorado, US

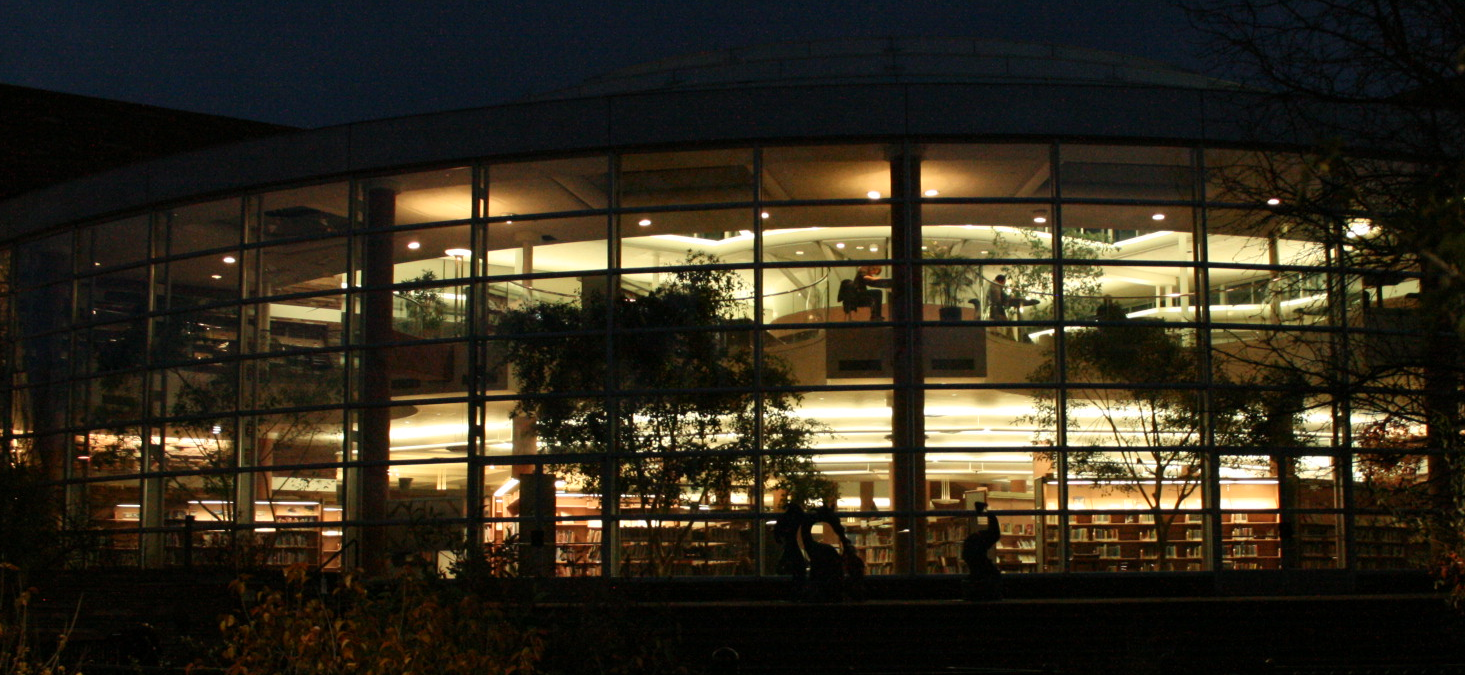
- Boulder Public Library main branch at night
- 40°00′50″N 105°16′54″W
- Location: 1001 Arapahoe Avenue, Boulder, CO 80302, United States of America
- Type: Public library
- Branches: 5

Collection
- Size: 333,432

Access and use
- Circulation: 1,446,816

Other information
- Website: http://www.boulderlibrary.org/
- References: BPL Annual Report 2012

The Boulder Public Library is the public library of Boulder, Colorado in the United States. The main branch and the Carnegie Branch Library for Local History are located in downtown Boulder. The George Reynolds Branch is in south Boulder, Meadows Branch is in east Boulder, and the North Boulder Branch, also called NoBo, is in north Boulder.

== History ==
The Boulder Public Library was originally housed in the Carnegie library on Pine Street, which was built in 1906, before moving to its present location on Canyon Boulevard in 1961. The original 1906 library was initially built with $15,000 donated by Andrew Carnegie. When the library moved to its present location, the architect selection committee selected James M. Hunter and Associates to execute the new design and construction of the new building. It was designed as a two-story building of 23,800 square feet, featuring sculpture galleries, reading rooms, gathering spaces, video viewing rooms, and music listening rooms. On November 4, 1959, the City Council voted to provide $450,000 in bonds to fund the design and construction. The final cost of the building was $486,437.19. The library was dedicated on November 12, 1961.

In late 2013, the main library temporarily housed the Boulder City Council while renovations were made to the main council building.

Major renovations to the library began in 2014. The renovations covered expansion and repairs to the main branch, and addressed aging electrical and data wiring among other repairs. The renovations were funded by $2.45 million in municipal bonds, approved as part of a larger bond initiative by Boulder voters in a 2011 referendum.

In March 2019, the Boulder Public Library eliminated overdue fines.

In November 2022, the Boulder Public Library District was formed. The district was formed as a result of a referendum, leading to the decoupling of the library from the municipality of Boulder. The new library district will be funded by a property tax mill levy.

== Collection and circulation ==
As of 2012, the library's collection was composed of 333,432 items including 94,352 e-books. The circulation in 2012 was 1,446,816.

== Branches ==
The Boulder Public Library system comprises five branches. The main branch is in downtown Boulder near Boulder Creek with an area of 92,164 square feet (8,562.3 m^{2}). An enclosed walkway spans the creek between the two library sections. The Carnegie Branch Library for Local History is also located in downtown Boulder with an area of 4,000 square feet (370 m^{2}). This branch focuses on the history of Boulder and the surrounding area. The George Reynolds branch — named after CU professor of English George F. Reynold — is in south Boulder with an area of 9,680 square feet (899 m^{2}). The Meadows branch is in east Boulder, and has an area of 7,800 square feet (720 m^{2}). On June 29, 2024, the NoBo branch opened its doors in north Boulder with an area of 12,000 square feet (1,100 m^{2}).
