= Allen House (Bon Secour, Alabama) =

- U.S. National Register of Historic Places
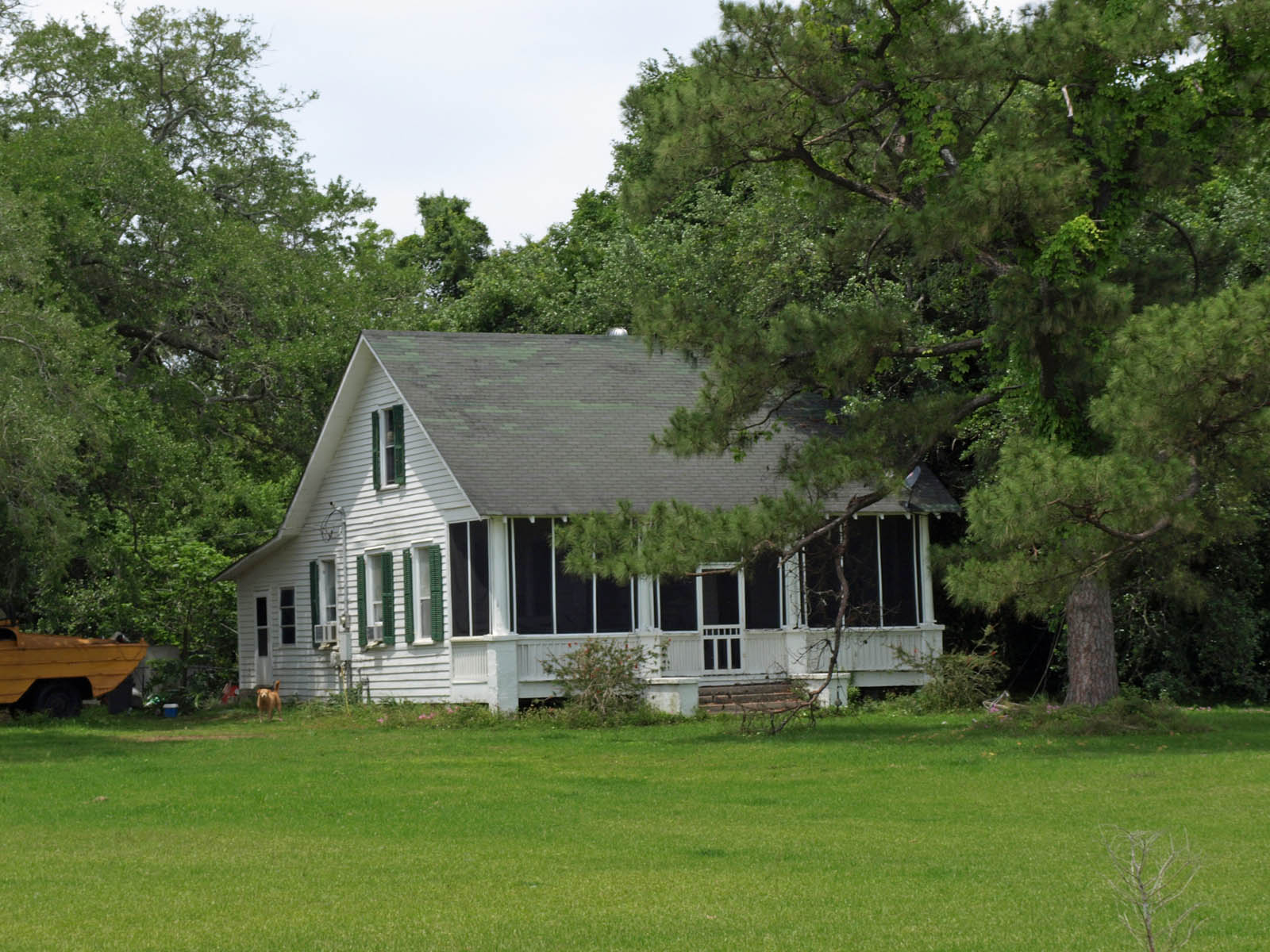

- Location within Alabama
- Location: Off CR 10 on N bank of Bon Secour River, Bon Secour, Alabama
- Coordinates: 30°18′09″N 87°44′13″W
- Area: 1.7 acres (0.69 ha)
- Built: c.1880
- Architectural style: Creole Cottage
- MPS: Creole and Gulf Coast Cottages in Baldwin County TR
- NRHP reference No.: 88002809
- Added to NRHP: December 20, 1988

The Allen House in Bon Secour, Alabama, United States, is a Creole cottage built around 1880. It was listed on the National Register of Historic Places in 1988. It may also have been known as the Marshall House.

It is located off County Route 10 on the north bank of the Bon Secour River.

The lot that contains the house was acquired by Louisa Allen in 1877 and she and her husband, James, an English oysterman who moved to America in 1840, constructed the house. James and Louisa had eight children together, one of which became a boiler maker, and James died in 1905. The Marshall family acquired the plot in 1930, and the house is owned by Ira Marshall as of 1988.

A different house, James Allen House, built about 1840, also on the Bon Secour River, was built of logs and has been updated over the years.
