= Charles Allen House (Worcester, Massachusetts) =

Historic house in Massachusetts, United States

- U.S. National Register of Historic Places
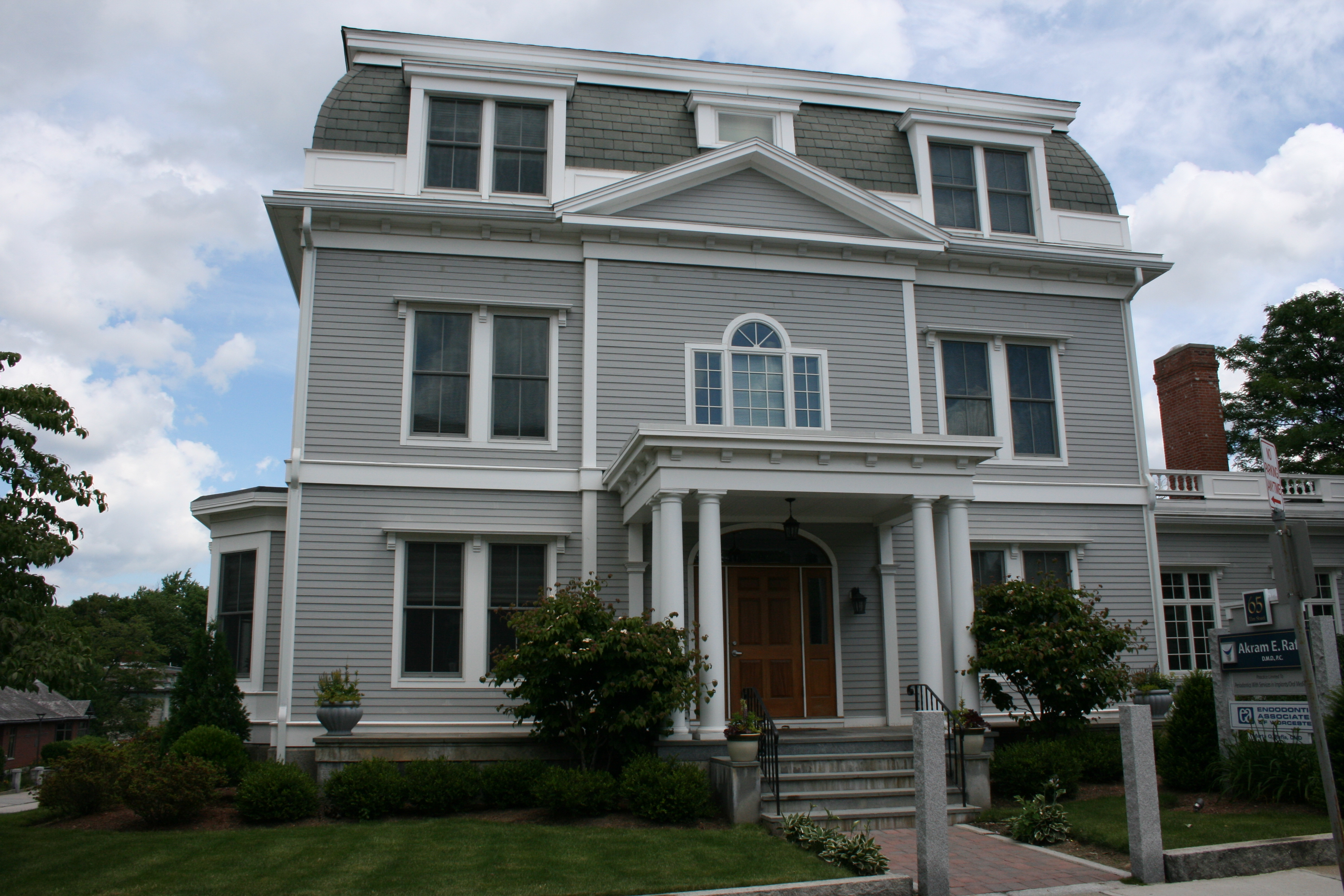

- Location within Massachusetts Location within the United States
- Location: 65 Elm St., Worcester, Massachusetts
- Coordinates: 42°15′56″N 71°48′33″W
- Built: 1870
- Architectural style: Second Empire
- MPS: Worcester MRA
- NRHP reference No.: 80000579
- Added to NRHP: March 05, 1980

The Charles Allen House is an historic house at 65 Elm Street in Worcester, Massachusetts. Built in 1870, it is notable as an unusual and well-preserved Second Empire house, and for its association with Massachusetts lawyer, politician, and jurist Charles Allen. The house was listed on the National Register of Historic Places in 1980. It now houses professional offices.

== Description and history ==
The Allen House is set on the north side of Elm Street, at its corner with West Street, several blocks west of Worcester's Main Street and downtown. The three-story mansard-roofed building is basically square in plan, with an ell projecting from its rear, and a central pavilion slightly projecting from its front facade. The pavilion rises two stories, and is topped by a pedimented gable. The main roof cornice is studded with modillions, as is that of the porch that shelters the front entry.

The house was apparently the idea of Charles Allen, and occupies a lot which previously belonged to Governor Levi Lincoln Jr., who had built a house there which Allen had moved a short distance to make way for this house. Allen was a high-profile Worcester native, working in law practice with John Davis, another Massachusetts governor. He served in the state legislature and as a local judge before being appointed the first chief justice of the newly organized Massachusetts Superior Court. He turned down an offer of a seat on the United States Supreme Court. Allen died in 1869, and the house may have been completed by his heirs, who owned the property into the early 20th century.

== See also ==
- National Register of Historic Places listings in northwestern Worcester, Massachusetts
- National Register of Historic Places listings in Worcester County, Massachusetts
