= John C. Allen House =

- U.S. National Register of Historic Places
- Location within Kentucky Location within the United States
- Nearest city: Summersville, Kentucky
- Coordinates: 37°18′41″N 85°30′44″W
- Area: 0.5 acres (0.20 ha)
- Built: 1803
- Architectural style: Federal
- MPS: Green County MRA
- NRHP reference No.: 85000917
- Added to NRHP: April 19, 1985

The John C. Allen House, on Kentucky Route 61 in Green County, Kentucky, about 1 mile (1.6 km) south of Summersville, Kentucky, was built in 1803. It was listed on the National Register of Historic Places in 1985.

It is notable for its Federal architecture and its display of pre-Federal features. It is a two-story, five-bay brick house, with brick laid in Flemish bond.
