= Charles Allen House (Christiana, Delaware) =

Historic house in Delaware, US

- U.S. National Register of Historic Places
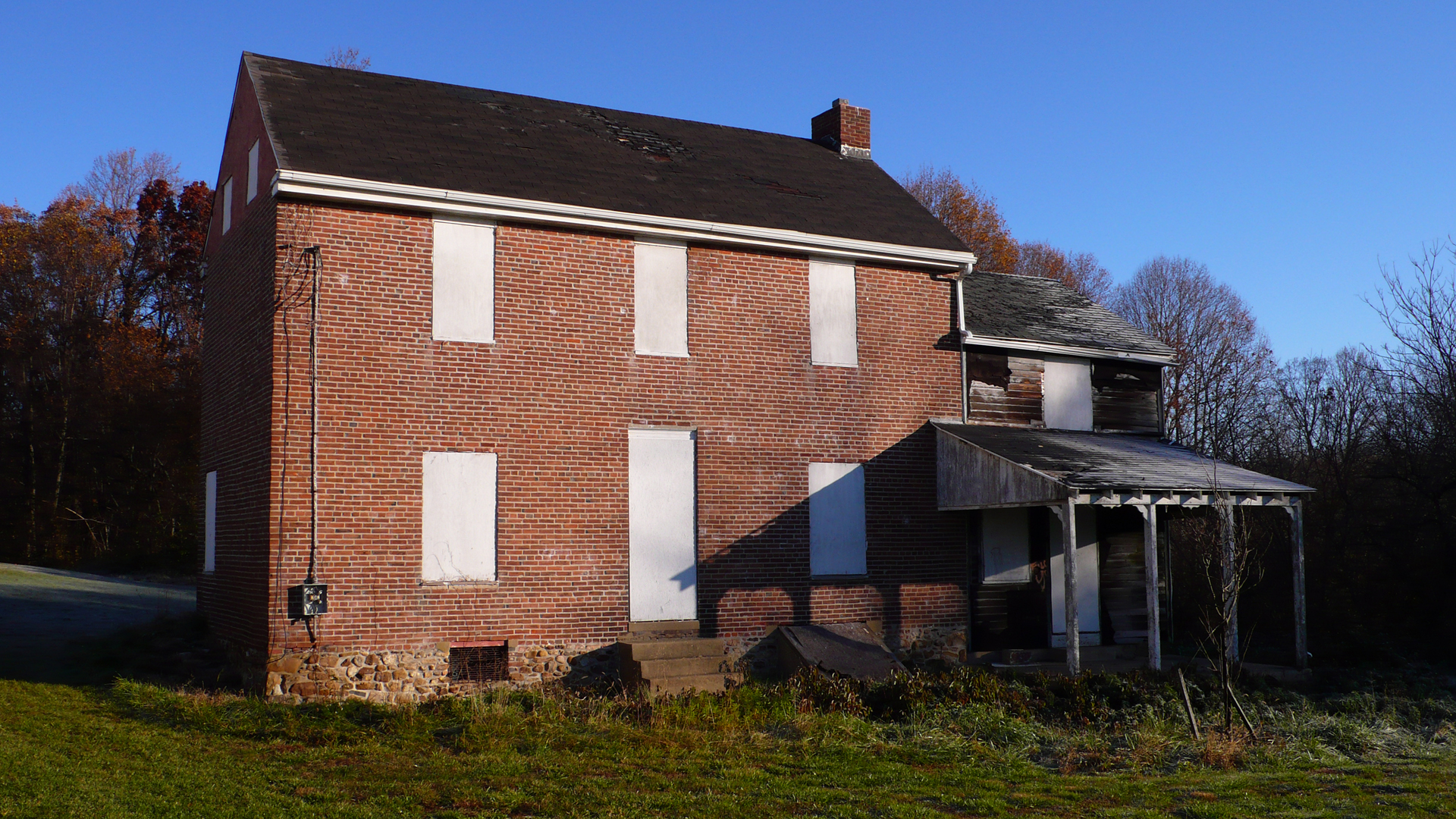
- Charles Allen House, November 2012

- Location within Delaware Location within the United States
- Location: 855 Canoe Rd., Christiana, Delaware
- Coordinates: 39°38′46″N 75°40′40″W
- Area: 2 acres (0.81 ha)
- MPS: White Clay Creek Hundred MRA
- NRHP reference No.: 83001348
- Added to NRHP: August 19, 1983

Charles Allen House is a historic home located at Christiana, Delaware, United States. It was built in the first half of the 19th century, and is a two-story, three-bay, single pile, gable-roofed dwelling. The main block is constructed of brick, and it has a two-story, one-bay frame addition built in the late-19th / early-20th century and a one-story, flat-roofed, stuccoed rear addition.

It was listed on the National Register of Historic Places in 1983.

Following the construction of a modern development, the house's address is now on Lauren Place, off Blue Ridge Road.

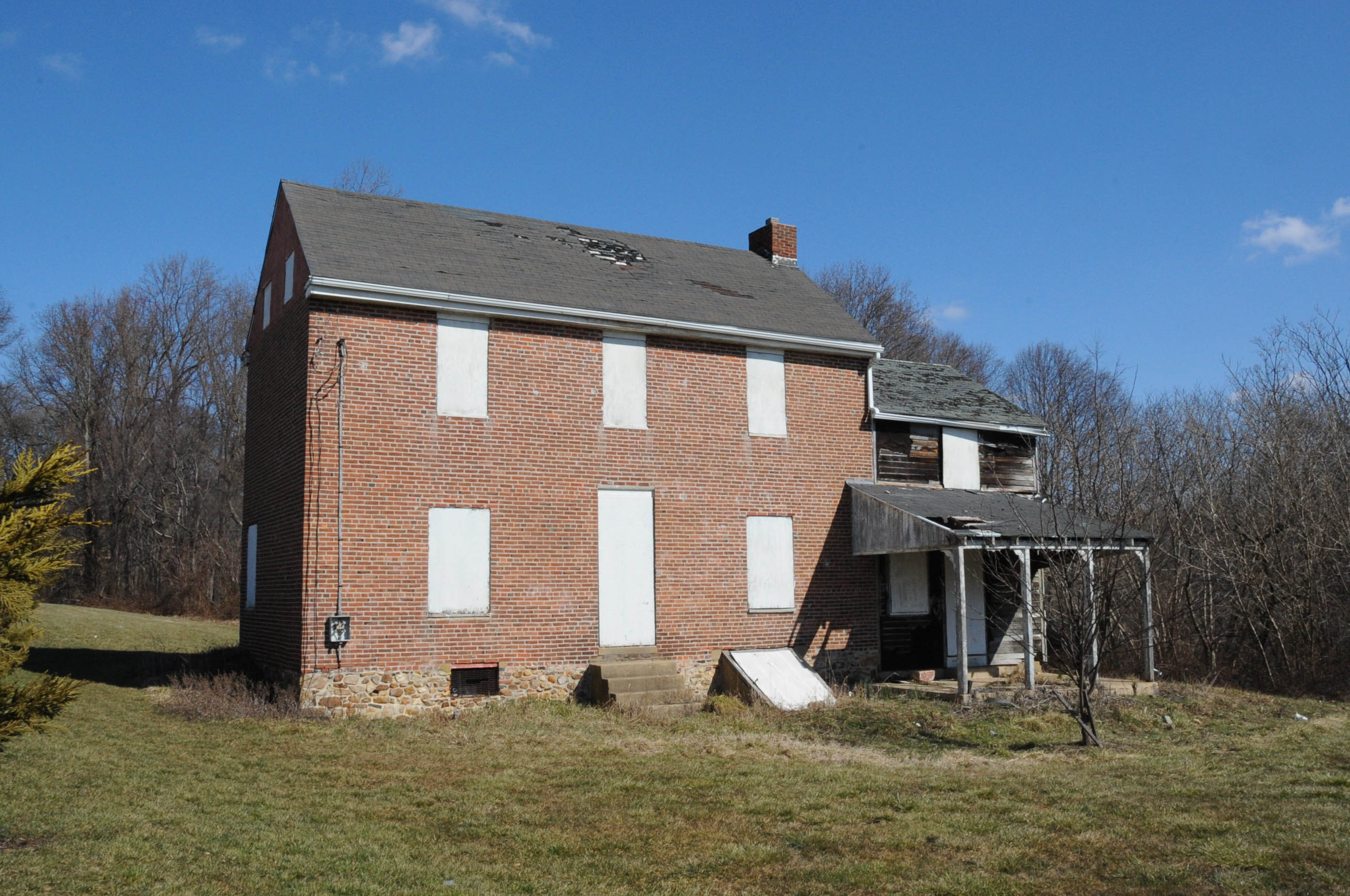
House in 2016 showing deterioration
