= J. B. Allen House (Petoskey, Michigan) =

Historic house in Michigan, United States

- U.S. National Register of Historic Places
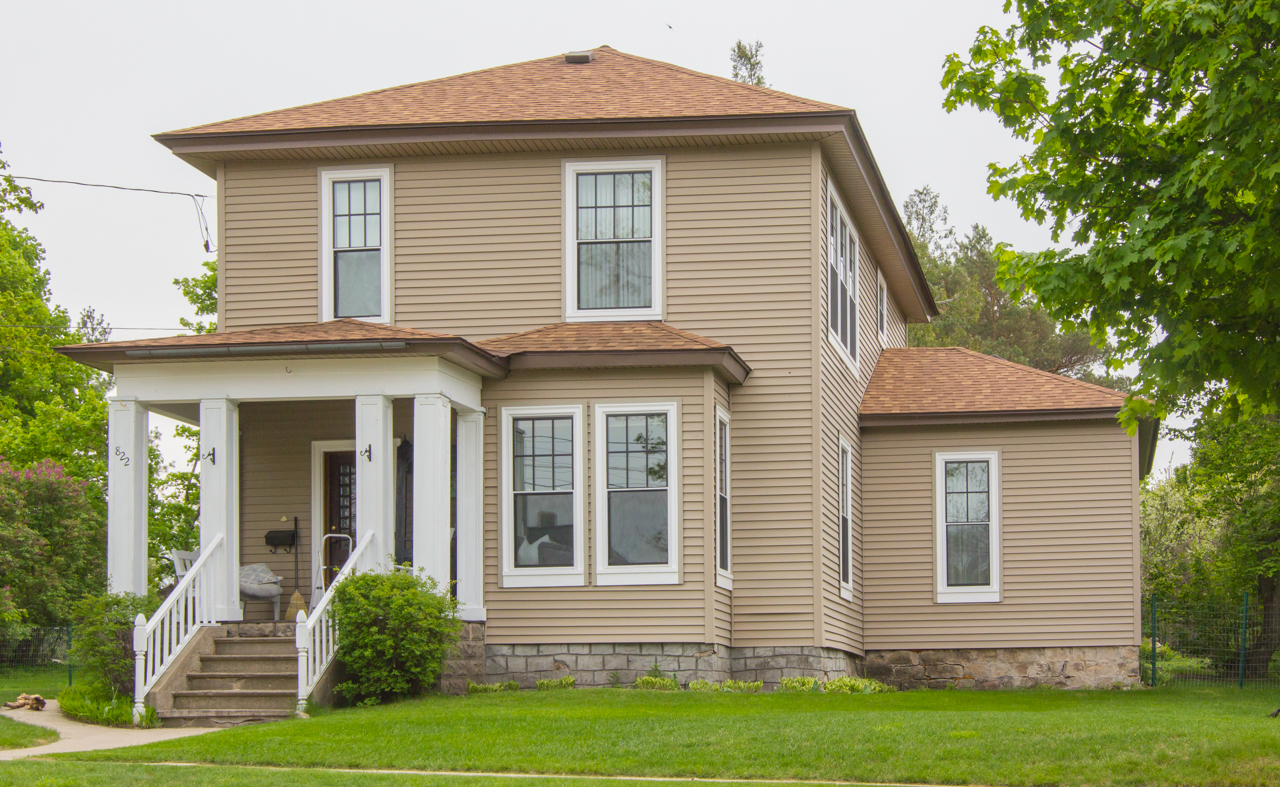
- J.B. Allen House, June 2015

- Location within Michigan Location within the United States
- Interactive map
- Location: 822 Grove Street; Petoskey, Michigan; United States
- Coordinates: 45°22′14″N 84°56′49″W
- Area: 0.3 acres (0.12 ha)
- Built: 1898
- Architectural style: Radford
- MPS: Petoskey MRA
- NRHP reference No.: 86001973
- Added to NRHP: September 10, 1986

The J. B. Allen House is a historic residence in Petoskey, Michigan, United States, that is listed on the National Register of Historic Places.

== Description ==
The private house is located at 822 Grove Street. It has a two-story hipped roof frame structure on a stone foundation. Its hipped roof entrance porch is supported by Doric piers. On the front, a single-story hip roofed bay projects forward. To the side, a single-story hipped roof addition extends from the main block of the house. The windows are one-over-one units.

The house was constructed c. 1898, and is associated with J.B. Allen, a teacher, who lived here by 1899. It was placed on the National Register of Historic Places September 10, 1986.

== See also ==
- National Register of Historic Places listings in Emmet County, Michigan
