= John Allen House (Keene, Kentucky) =

- U.S. National Register of Historic Places
- Location within Kentucky Location within the United States
- Nearest city: Keene, Kentucky
- Coordinates: 37°58′40″N 84°41′00″W
- Area: 4 acres (1.6 ha)
- Built: c.1790
- Built by: John Allen
- Architectural style: Federal
- MPS: Early Stone Buildings of Central Kentucky TR
- NRHP reference No.: 83002892
- Added to NRHP: June 23, 1983

The John Allen House, off Kentucky Route 169 in Woodford County, Kentucky near Keene, was listed on the National Register of Historic Places in 1983. The listing included two contributing buildings.

It is an early dry stone hall-parlor plan house believed to have been built c.1790 by John Allen, who received a 1,000 acres (400 ha) grant in 1780 in what was then Virginia, due to his father's military service in 1763. John Allen was an American Revolutionary War soldier from Fauquier County, Virginia.

A stone wing added c.1810 includes a Federal-style mantel.
