= National Register of Historic Places listings in Gwinnett County, Georgia =

Location of Gwinnett County in Georgia

This is a list of properties and districts in Gwinnett County, Georgia that are listed on the National Register of Historic Places (NRHP).

This National Park Service list is complete through NPS recent listings posted March 21, 2025.

== Current listings ==
	Name on the Register	Image	Date listed	Location	City or town	Description
1	Alcovy Road Grist Mill	Alcovy Road Grist Mill	July 23, 1998 (#98000885)	1564 Alcovy Rd. 33°57′46″N 83°55′35″W	Dacula	
2	Bona Allen House	Bona Allen House	September 1, 1983 (#83000231)	395 Main St. 34°07′25″N 84°00′01″W	Buford	
3	John Quincy Allen House	John Quincy Allen House	January 12, 1984 (#84001109)	345 E. Main St. 34°07′21″N 84°00′04″W	Buford	
4	Bona Allen Shoe and Horse Collar Factory	Bona Allen Shoe and Horse Collar Factory	January 3, 2005 (#04001138)	554 W. Main St. 34°06′50″N 84°00′43″W	Buford	
5	Buford Public School Auditorium		August 5, 2009 (#09000586)	4975 Little Mill Rd. 34°07′10″N 84°00′38″W	Buford	
6	Robert Craig Plantation	Robert Craig Plantation	June 8, 1990 (#90000805)	1504 Five Forks Trickum Rd. 33°54′24″N 84°00′59″W	Lawrenceville	
7	Gwinnett County Courthouse	Gwinnett County Courthouse	September 18, 1980 (#80001084)	Courthouse Sq. 33°57′24″N 83°59′21″W	Lawrenceville	
8	Mechanicsville School	Mechanicsville School	October 16, 1980 (#80001085)	3980 Florida Ave. Northwest; 33°55′43″N 84°14′50″W	Peachtree Corners	Formerly located in unincorporated Gwinnett County (near Norcross), now within the city limits of Peachtree Corners. The building is typical of early 20th Century rural schoolhouse architecture. The school was a fixture of the Mechanicsville community in the early 1900s.
9	Norcross Historic District	Norcross Historic District	November 21, 1980 (#80001086)	Off U.S. 23; 33°56′33″N 84°12′44″W	Norcross	
10	Old Seminary Building	Old Seminary Building	December 29, 1970 (#70000206)	455 Perry St. 33°57′09″N 83°59′20″W	Lawrenceville	
11	Parks-Strickland Archeological Complex	Parks-Strickland Archeological Complex	December 8, 1989 (#89002034)	Little Mulberry Park; 34°02′29″N 83°53′04″W	Dacula	
12	The Superb	The Superb	March 9, 1999 (#98001560)	3595 S. Old Peachtree Rd. 33°59′19″N 84°09′20″W	Duluth	Railroad car that was used by U.S. President Harding
13	Suwanee Historic District	Suwanee Historic District	December 24, 2013 (#13000966)	Main, Russell & White Sts., Stonecypher & Scales Rds., N & S Railroad; 34°03′10″N 84°04′27″W	Suwanee	
14	William Terrell Homeplace		August 26, 1982 (#82002423)	E of Lawrenceville off US 29; 33°57′59″N 83°57′58″W	Lawrenceville	
15	Clarence R. Ware House	Clarence R. Ware House	June 17, 1982 (#82002424)	293 N. Perry St. 33°57′30″N 83°59′25″W	Lawrenceville	
16	Elisha Winn House	Elisha Winn House	December 18, 1979 (#79000728)	N of Dacula at 908 Dacula Rd. 34°01′24″N 83°54′30″W	Dacula	
17	Thomas Wynne House	Thomas Wynne House	July 8, 1977 (#77000436)	N of Lilburn on U.S. 29; 33°53′57″N 84°08′17″W	Lilburn	

== Former listings ==
	Name on the Register	Image	Date listed	Date removed	Location	City or town	Description
1	Isaac Adair House	Isaac Adair House	November 29, 2000 (#00001390)	February 6, 2020	15 S Clayton St; 33°55′31″N 83°57′20″W	Lawrenceville	Relocated to its current location in 2008 due to construction of the Sugarloaf Parkway through its previous location.
2	Hudson-Nash House and Cemetery	Hudson-Nash House and Cemetery	January 4, 1990 (#89002264)	April 26, 2019	3490 Five Forks Trickum Rd. 33°52′29″N 84°04′21″W	Lilburn	Delisted due to relocation to Yellow River Post Office Park.

== See also ==
- National Register of Historic Places listings in Georgia (U.S. state)
- List of National Historic Landmarks in Georgia (U.S. state)
