= Bona Allen Building =

Turner Building
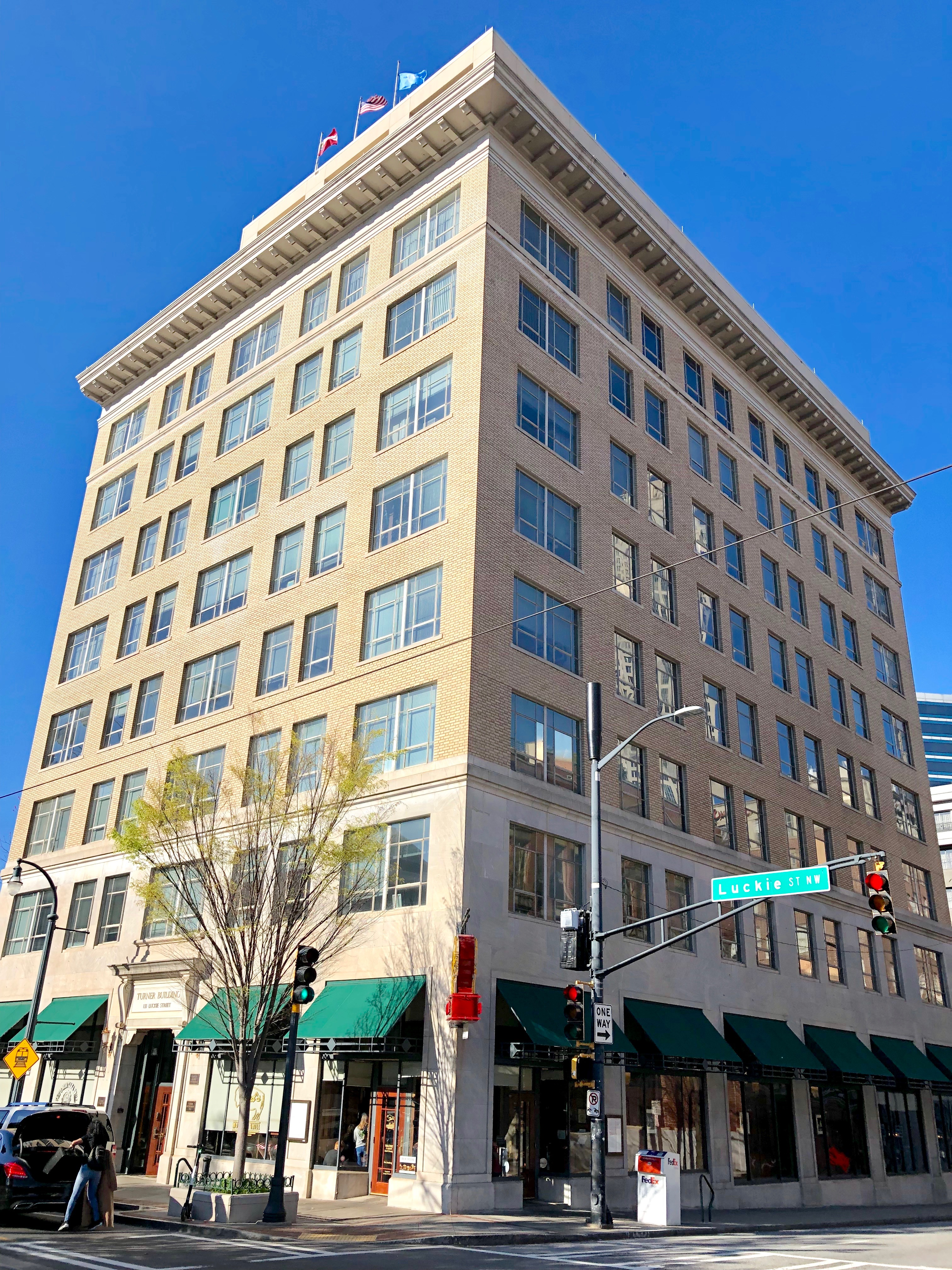
- Turner Building (2019)

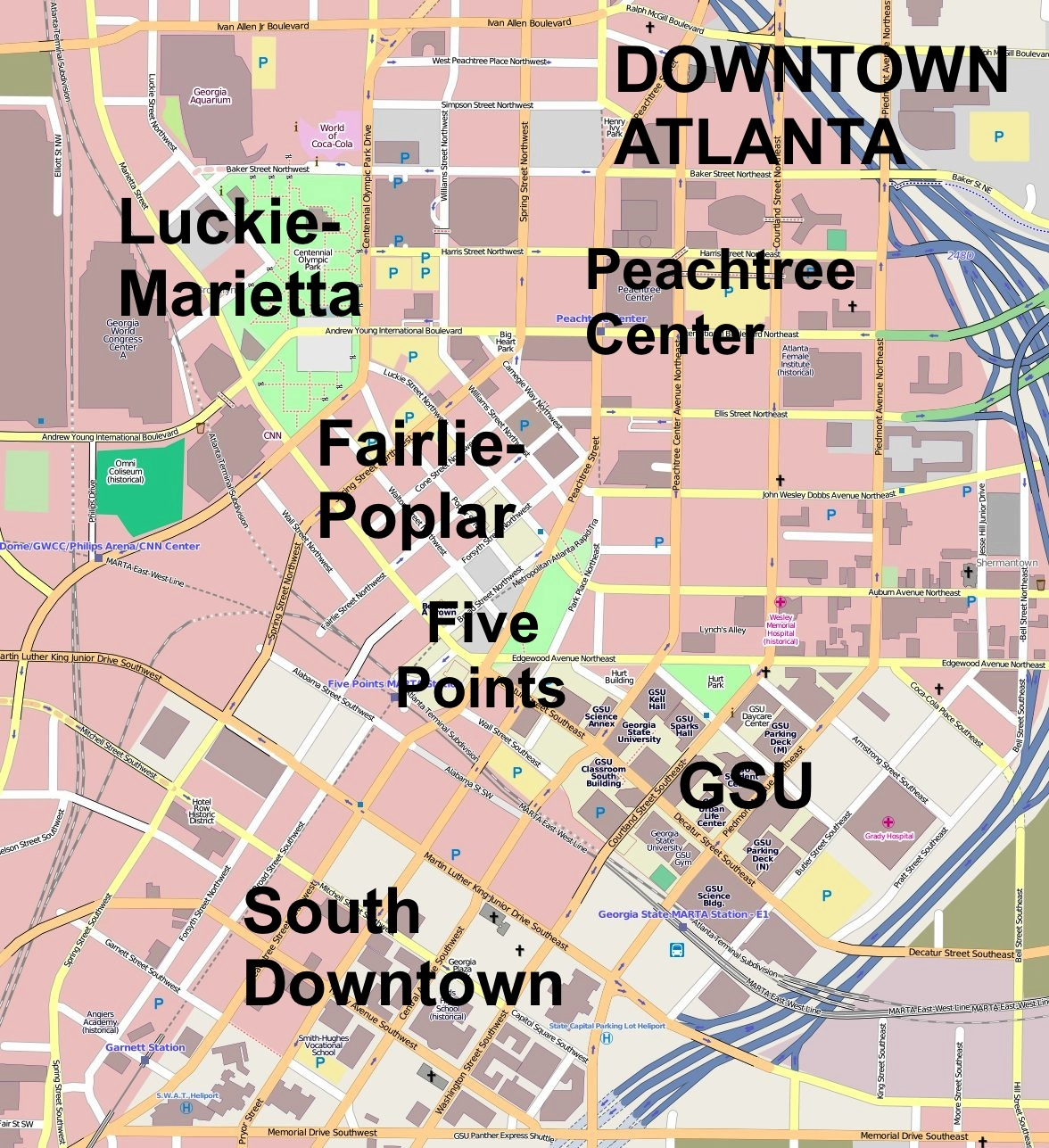
- Location within Downtown Atlanta Bona Allen Building (Atlanta) Bona Allen Building (Georgia) Bona Allen Building (the United States)
- Former names: Bona Allen Building

General information
- Status: Completed
- Architectural style: Art Deco
- Location: 133 Luckie Street NW; Atlanta, Georgia 30303
- Coordinates: 33.7586°N 84.3906°W
- Completed: 1923

Height
- Height: 115.73 feet (35.27 m)

Technical details
- Floor count: 9

Design and construction
- Architect: John F. Downing

The Bona Allen Building is a historic nine-story office building, built in 1917, in downtown Atlanta, Georgia.

It was designed by architect John F. Downing.

It later became known as the Turner Building.

== See also ==
- Bona Allen Company
- Bona Allen Mansion
