= John Quincy Allen House =

Historic house in Georgia, United States

- U.S. National Register of Historic Places
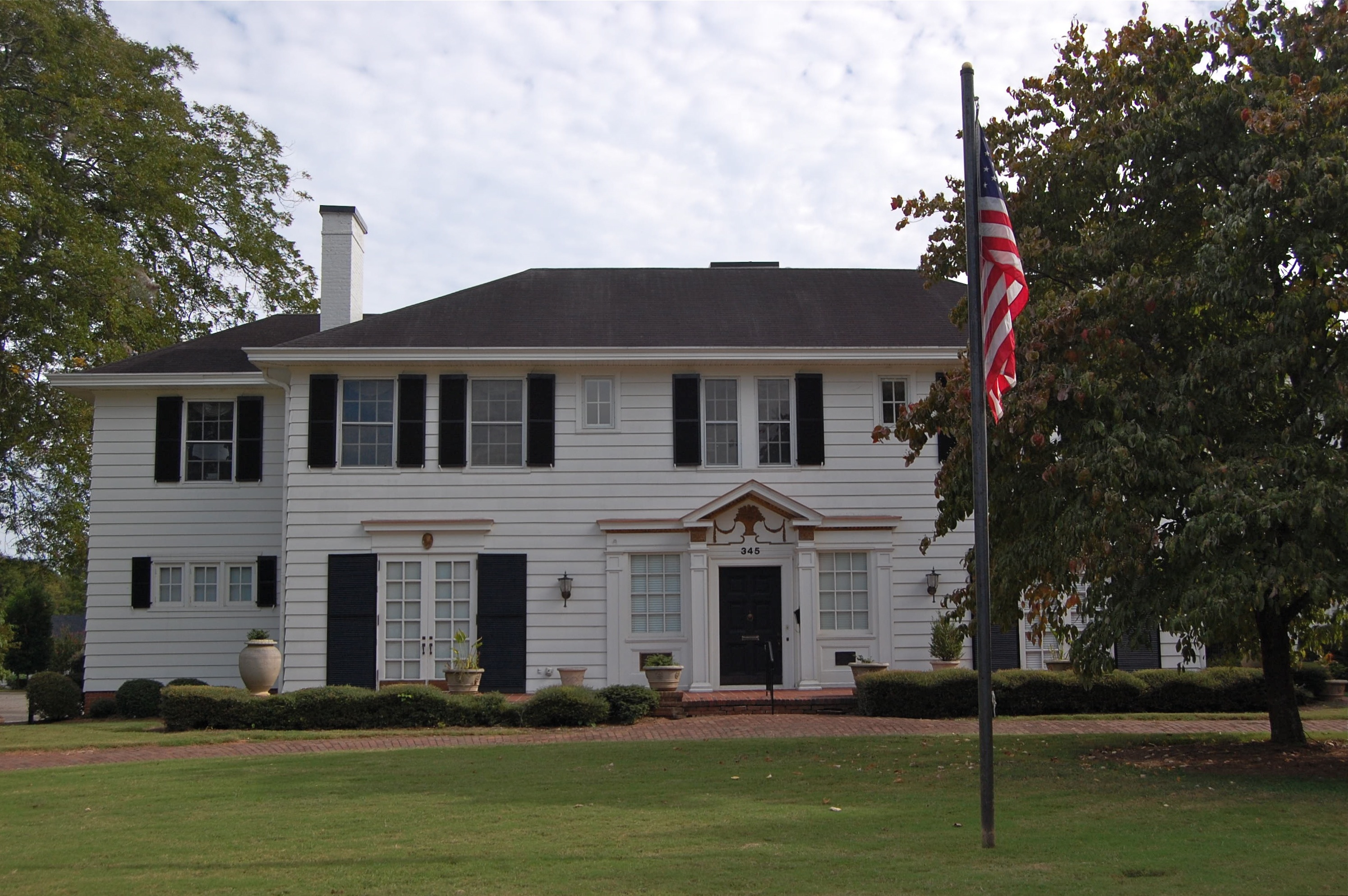
- John Quincy Allen House

- Location within Georgia Location within the United States
- Location: 345 E. Main St., Buford, Georgia
- Coordinates: 34°7′21″N 84°0′4″W
- Area: 1.3 acres (0.53 ha)
- Built: 1911
- Architectural style: Georgian Revival
- NRHP reference No.: 84001109
- Added to NRHP: January 12, 1984

The John Quincy Allen House is a historic residence in Buford, Georgia. Its architectural style is described as Georgian Revival architecture. It was added to the National Register of Historic Places in 1984. It is located at 345 East Main Street.

Its Georgian Revival details include a Palladian portico with flower basket-and-garlands relief.

It was home of John Quincy Allen (1880–1967), one of five children of Bona Allen, Sr. (1846–1925), builder of the Bona Allen Company. It was one of seven Allen family homes along the railroad that runs through the center of Buford, linking to the expansive Bona Allen Shoe and Horse Collar Factory.

== See also ==
- National Register of Historic Places listings in Gwinnett County, Georgia
