= A. F. N. Everett =

American architect (1880–1937)

Alexander F. N. Everett
- Born: April 13, 1880; Atlanta, Georgia
- Died: February 9, 1937 (aged 56); Atlanta, Georgia
- Resting place: Oakland Cemetery
- Occupation: Architect
- Spouse: Susie Griffin
- Children: 1 son

Alexander F. N. Everett (April 13, 1880 – February 9, 1937), also known as A. F. N. Everett, was an American architect who designed many buildings in his hometown of Atlanta, Georgia, including some listed on the National Register of Historic Places.

== Personal life ==
Everett was born on April 13, 1880, in Atlanta, Georgia. His father, A.R. Everett of Boston, Massachusetts, founded first wholesale jewelry firm in Atlanta; his mother was Lena Goldsmith of Charleston, South Carolina.

Everett married Susie Griffin of Valdosta on January 19, 1901. They resided at 1052 Dickson Place NE in Midtown Atlanta with their son, F. N. Everett.

== Career ==
Everett was trained by G. L. Norman. During 1900–1902, he worked with builder Stephen Fagan Fulgham in Valdosta, Georgia, and he returned to Atlanta by 1903. Everett remained in Atlanta as a practicing architect until his death in February 1937, at the age of 56.

There exist contradictions between sources about Everett possibly working together with Alexander Campbell Bruce in the firm of Bruce and Everett, about whether it was A.F.N. Everett or a different person, Arthur Greene Everett, of Boston, who worked with Bruce. This source asserts it was Arthur Green Everett.

That firm for a time was known as Bruce, Everett, and Hayes, and Bruce was the senior partner. An Everett worked with Bruce by 1908. The partnership appears to have lasted through the design of three projects, built in 1906–1908. (Note: The NRHP nomination document for the Converse-Dalton House states that "The only known work of that short-lived firm is the First Congregational Church on 105 Courtland Street, Atlanta." But another source, the NRHP nomination document for the Kirkwood School (1906), states "Apart from the Kirkwood School, Bruce collaborated with Everett on only two Atlanta buildings, the St. Johns Methodist Episcopal Church (1907) and the First Congregational Church (1908).")

Everett designed churches and apartment buildings in the Beaux-Arts style in the 1920s. For example, he designed Druid Hills Courts in 1922. Everett also designed private residences, like the Evans-Cucich House on Peachtree Battle Avenue in Atlanta's Buckhead neighborhood in the Art Deco style in 1934 for Hiram Wesley Evans.

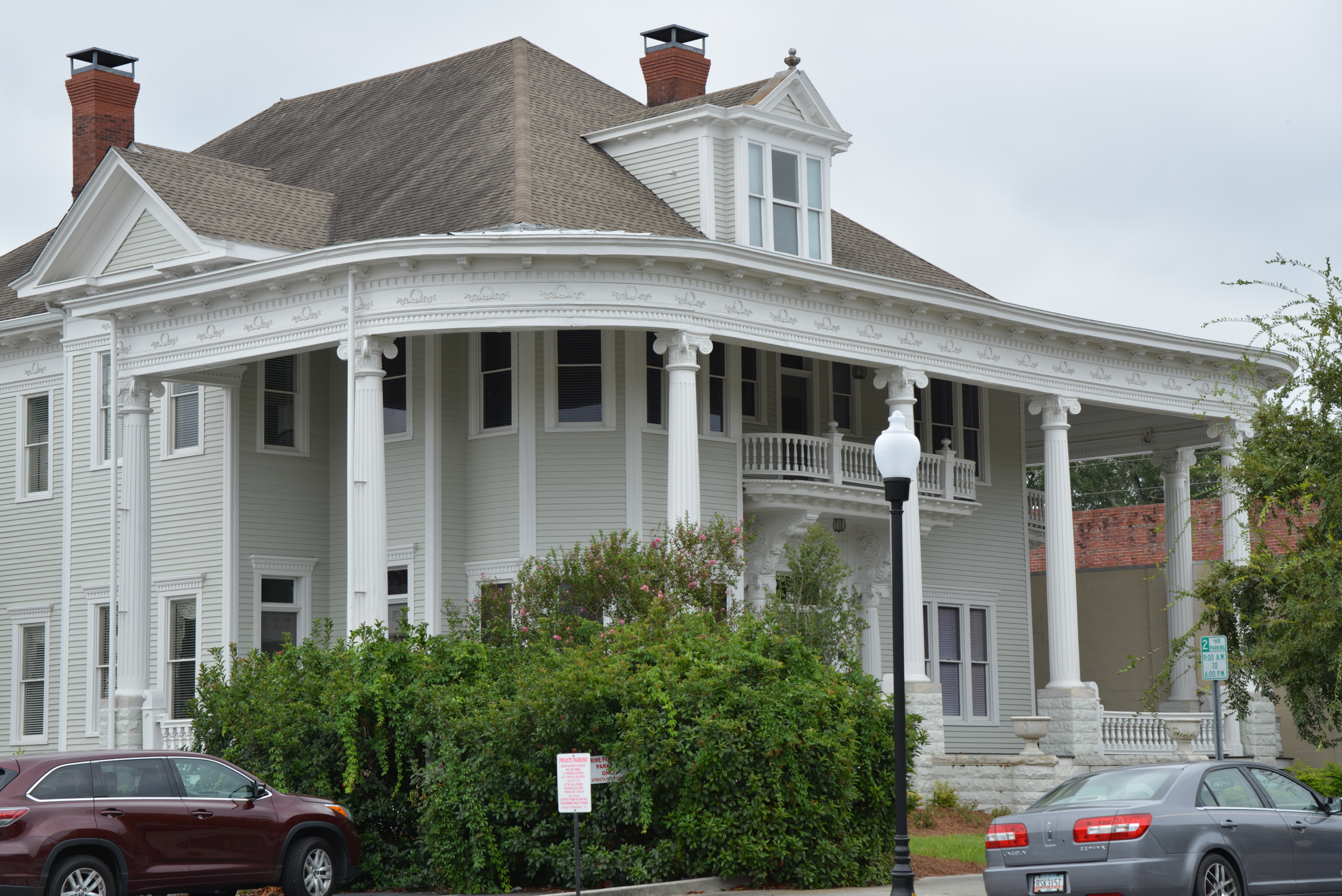
Converse-Dalton House

Works of his (on his own or with others) include:

- Converse-Dalton House (1902), 305 N. Patterson St., Valdosta, GA, NRHP-listed
- Kirkwood School (1906), 138 Kirkwood Rd., Atlanta, GA (the portion of Atlanta in Dalton County) (Bruce, Everett and Hayes), NRHP-listed (which is also included in the Kirkwood Historic District )
- St. Nicholas Hotel, 141 Flint Ave., 300–310 Washington St., Albany, GA (Bruce & Everett), NRHP-listed
- First Congregational Church (built 1910–12), Atlanta, designed with A.C. Bruce. A.F.N. Everett is noted in some sources as being architect of the First Congregational Church in Atlanta, along with A.C. Bruce, but the NRHP nomination document for the church asserts it was designed by a different Everett, namely Arthur Greene Everett, of Boston, along with A.C. Bruce. Arthur Greene Everett is an architect who lived from August 14, 1855, to October 5, 1925, who once worked with McKim, Mead and White in New York, and otherwise practiced most of his life in Boston. The church appears to have been built during 1910–12 but could have been designed earlier.
- Druid Hills Courts (1922)
- Evans-Cucich House (1934), Peachtree Battle Avenue, Atlanta, "one of the few Art Deco homes in Atlanta."
- Marian Apartments, 400 W. Poplar St., Griffin, GA, NRHP-listed
- Selig Company Building, 330–346 Marietta St., Atlanta, NRHP-listed
- St. Johns Methodist (a.k.a. East St. Stephens Missionary Baptist, Celebration Hall), 181 Ralph David Abernathy Blvd.
- Craigie House/DAR building, Atlanta The building partially collapsed in 2014 and was abruptly demolished in 2016.

178 15th St Ne (formerly 58 East 15th St, commissioned in 1906 for William Oliver Jones in the then-new Ansley Park development, now in midtown Atlanta. Jones was the commissioner of police, and owned the livery in downtown Atlanta.

== Death ==
Everett died on February 9, 1937, in Atlanta, at age 56. His funeral was held at the chapel of Awtry & Lowndes by a Church of Christ, Scientist minister, and he was buried in Oakland Cemetery.
