= Bona Allen Company =

Defunct American tannery

The Bona Allen Company
- Type: Manufacturer
- Industry: Leather Goods
- Founded: 1873
- Founder: Bonaparte Allen Sr.
- Defunct: 1981
- Headquarters: Buford, Georgia, USA
- Products: horse saddles, bridles, horse collars, postal bags, cowboy boots, shoes, baseballs, baseball gloves
- Number of employees: 2,200

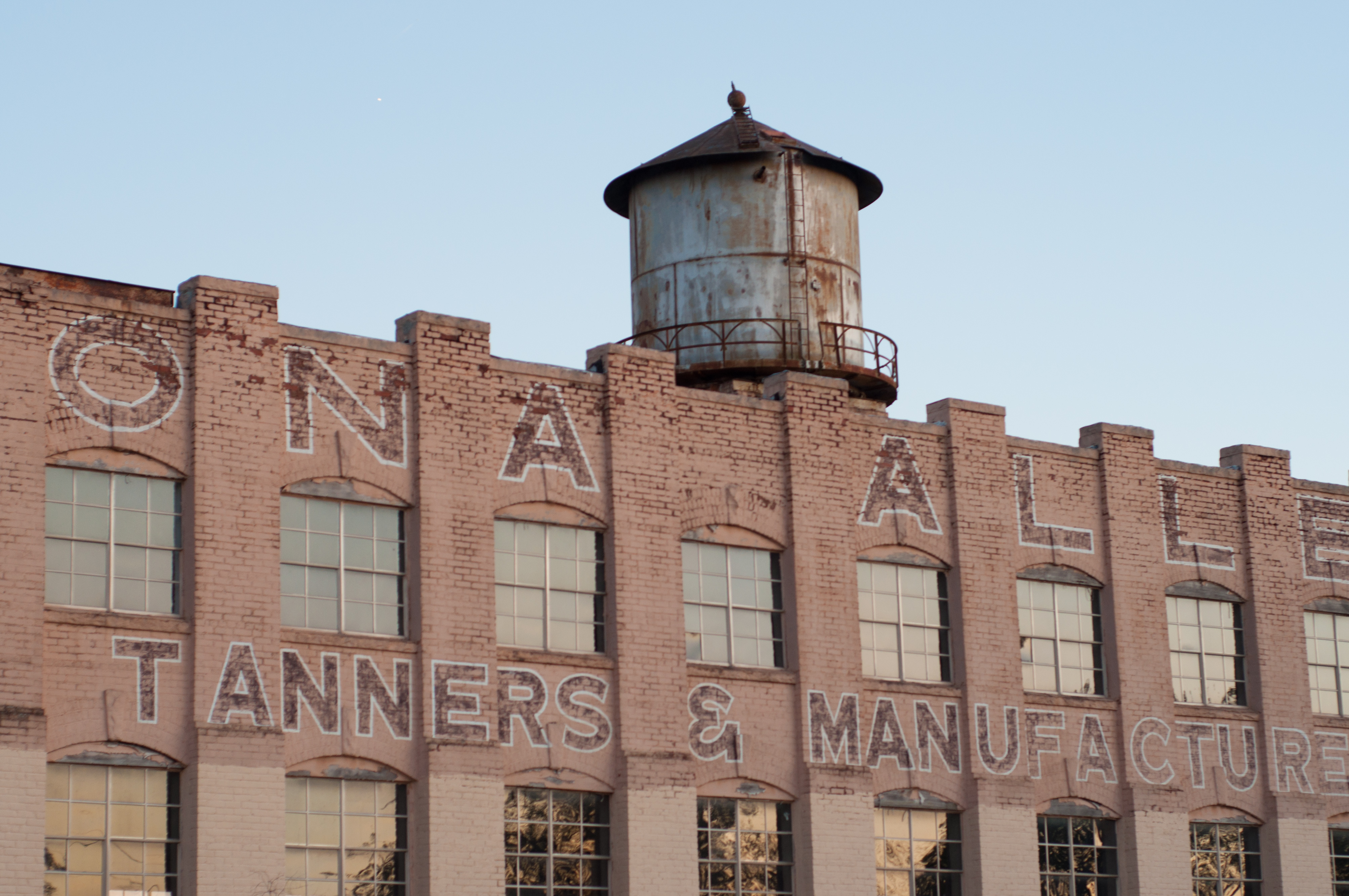
Bona Allen Tanners and Manufacturers building

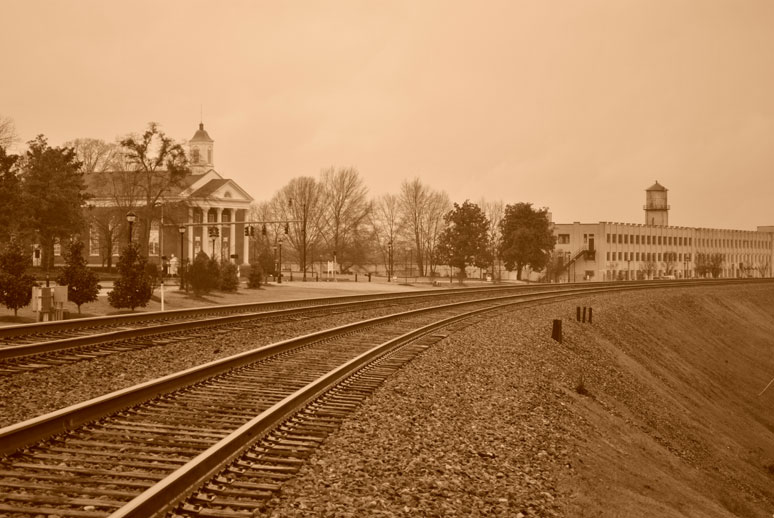
Bona Allen Tannery

The Bona Allen Company is a tannery and leather goods factory that opened in 1873 in Buford, Georgia. It became the nation's largest producer of hand-tooled saddles, bridles, horse collars, postal bags, cowboy boots, and shoes and had a contract to supply the sporting equipment giant, Spalding, with raw material for the manufacture of baseballs and baseball mitts. Starting in the early 20th century Bona Allen saddles were offered in the Sears Mail Order catalog under a variety of names. The Bona Allen Company was owned by Bonaparte Allen Sr. Also known as the Bona Allen Shoe and Horse Collar Factory, the factory closed in 1981 after a fire, and the main tannery building was added to the National Register of Historic Places on January 3, 2005. It is located at 554 West Main Street. After another fire on February 10, 2015, firefighters allowed the building to burn itself down.

== History ==
Bonaparte Allen learned the trade of tanning from his father, Washington Allen. Bonaparte opened the Bona Allen Company at the age of 27 and operated it as a tannery and leather goods shop. It started off making whiplashes, then followed with the production of horse collars. In 1903, a fire swept through the building and destroyed the business and the entire building. Allen lost everything. But, thanks to his established business track record, a local bank loaned him the money he needed to re-establish and rebuild his business. It didn't take Bonaparte long to restore his thriving business and pay off all of his debt.

In 1925, Bonaparte Allen died. He left everything to his sons, Bona Jr., John, and Victor. They took over their father's business and continued to produce what some people have deemed the country's finest leather. The Great Depression of the early 1930s had a positive effect on the company's tannery. The nation's farmers could no longer afford to operate their tractors, so they had to return to using horses. This, in turn, created a demand for saddles and collars, as well as all other horse related equipment.

The Bona Allen Company continued to expand and soon was selling groceries and dried goods in addition to its leather products. In 1933, a Bona Allen saddle won a blue ribbon at the Chicago World's Fair. At the fair, The Bona Allen Company provided several jobs as well as entertainment; it sponsored many sports events and teams such as basketball, football, and the Bona Allen Company's own baseball team. In 1941, a strike was called and shut down the company's shoe plant. Six months later, the government stepped in and reopened the shoe plant to repair army shoes. The company's collar factory was closed for good after WWII.

The Bona Allen Company received special acclaim in the 1950s for production of its classic saddles. During the peak of western movies, many of Hollywood's famous cowboy actors, including Roy Rogers, William F. ("Buffalo Bill") Cody, Gene Autry, Kenny Rogers, Lash LaRue, Gabby Hayes, and the cast of the popular NBC-TV show Bonanza, preferred a Bona Allen saddle—some even bringing their horses to Buford, Georgia, to get them custom fitted. To head its saddle department, the Company hired Victor Alexander, a famous saddle expert from the King Ranch in Texas. Under his management, the Bona Allen Company produced some of the finest hand-tooled saddles and bridles ever made, including a silver-studded special order saddle for Roy Rogers.

Bonaparte Allen also owned up to 200 houses that he would rent to his employees; the houses would typically rent for $4.00 to $12.00 per month. Some employees could buy them with no down payment. In 1932, the Bona Allen Company hit the peak of its employment: 2,200 people worked there until rough times hit in 1943, when it closed its horse collar factory, shoe and chrome tannery—dropping its total employee headcount to 500. Following the death of John Allen in 1968, the tannery and saddle and harness factories were sold to Tandy Corporation. The railroad depot closed in 1972, and the demand for horse-related leather goods decreased. While Tandy Corp. continued operations for a few years under the Bona Allen name, after the devastating tannery fire in December 1981, they chose not to rebuild, and the last of the Bona Allen Company's 160 employees were let go.

On February 10, 2015, a warehouse caught fire. Gwinnett County allowed the building to burn itself out, citing dangers from leftover chemicals.

== Shoemaking ==
In 1918, The Bona Allen Tannery expanded into shoes and boots. At one point, it was manufacturing 4,000 to 5,000 pairs of shoes and boots a day. It was profitable at first, but production was cut during the Great Depression. In 1941, the Company ceased shoe production due to labor unrest, but the factory was reopened at the request of the United States federal government during World War II to make footwear for the United States military.

In 1933, a size 300 shoe made by the Bona Allen Company was advertised as "The Largest Shoe in the World on Wheels."

== Bona Allen Shoemakers Semi-Pro Baseball Team ==
In the 1930s, factories and mills across the nation sponsored semi-pro baseball teams to advertise their businesses, provide affordable entertainment and serve as a source of civic interest and community pride. Major league baseball had only 16 teams, and semi-pro baseball teams grew in popularity. John Q. Allen, a son of Bona Allen, arranged for The Bona Allen Shoe Company to sponsor one of the finest semi-pro teams in US history, known as The Bona Allen Shoemakers. In 1933, the Shoemakers won 56 of its 61 games.

The Bona Allen Shoemakers were a semi-pro industrial league baseball team sponsored by the Bona Allen Shoe Company. They were active during the late 1920s through the early 1940s when World War II began. Their most successful years were the late '30s and early '40s. They won the 1938 national semi-pro championship held in Wichita, Kansas, as well as the Denver Post baseball tournament championship in 1940.

== Monuments ==
A statue of Roy Rogers, his horse Trigger, and saddle-maker Jack Johnson now stands in downtown Buford's park as a tribute to the tannery. This statue, across the street from the Buford, Georgia, based tannery recreates Roy Rogers and a Bona Allen employee putting a newly purchased saddle on Rogers' horse Trigger. The story behind the statue began when Roy Rogers and Trigger rode east on a private train for Trigger to be fitted for one of Bona Allen's renowned saddles. The statue features Trigger rearing, with Rogers in pointed boots and western gear standing to the side and the saddle craftsman, Jack Johnson, standing on the other.

== Historic Residences ==
The Bona Allen Mansion

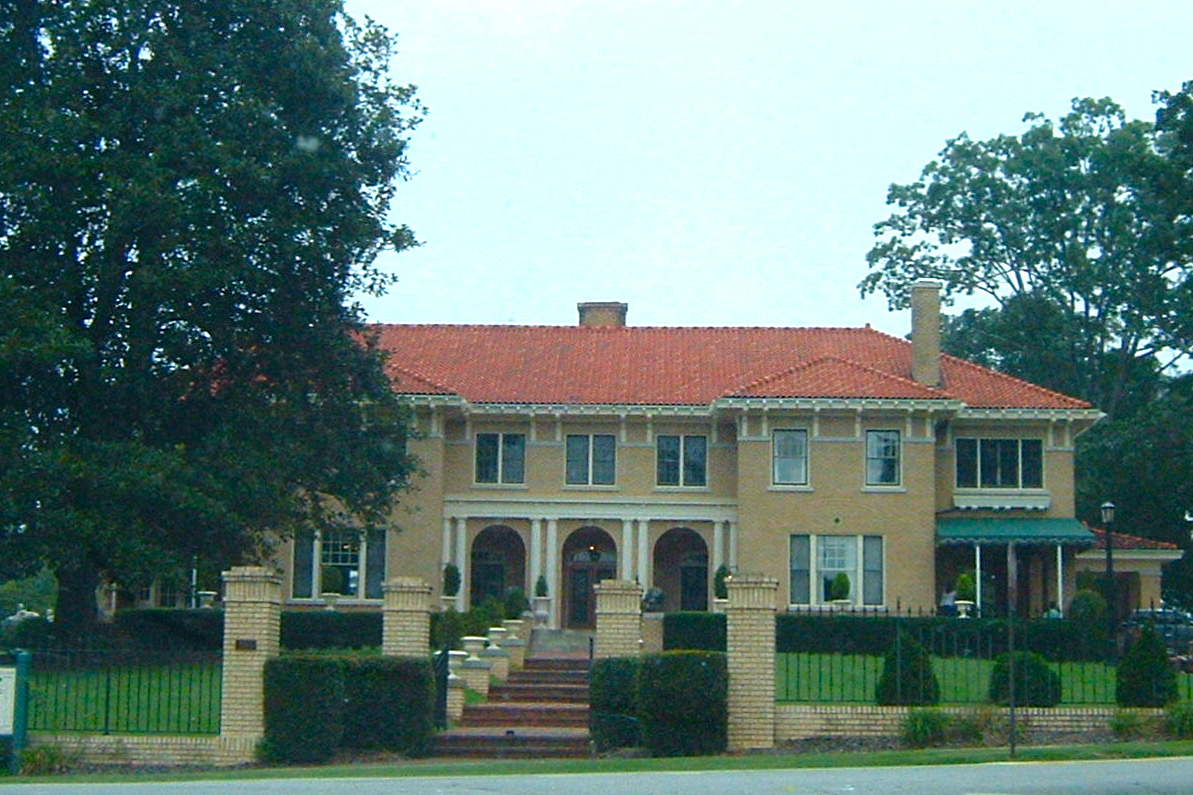
Bona Allen Mansion

The Bona Allen Mansion, originally on 1,700 acres, has been listed on the National Register of Historical Places. The home was designed by Atlanta architect Haralson Bleckley. The main 9,000 square foot house has 17 rooms, 12-foot ceilings, original carved wood paneling, moldings, stained glass windows and seven fireplaces. The two-story entry showcases an original Italian wall mural of the Castello Villa Franca in South Rome.

The John Q. Allen Home

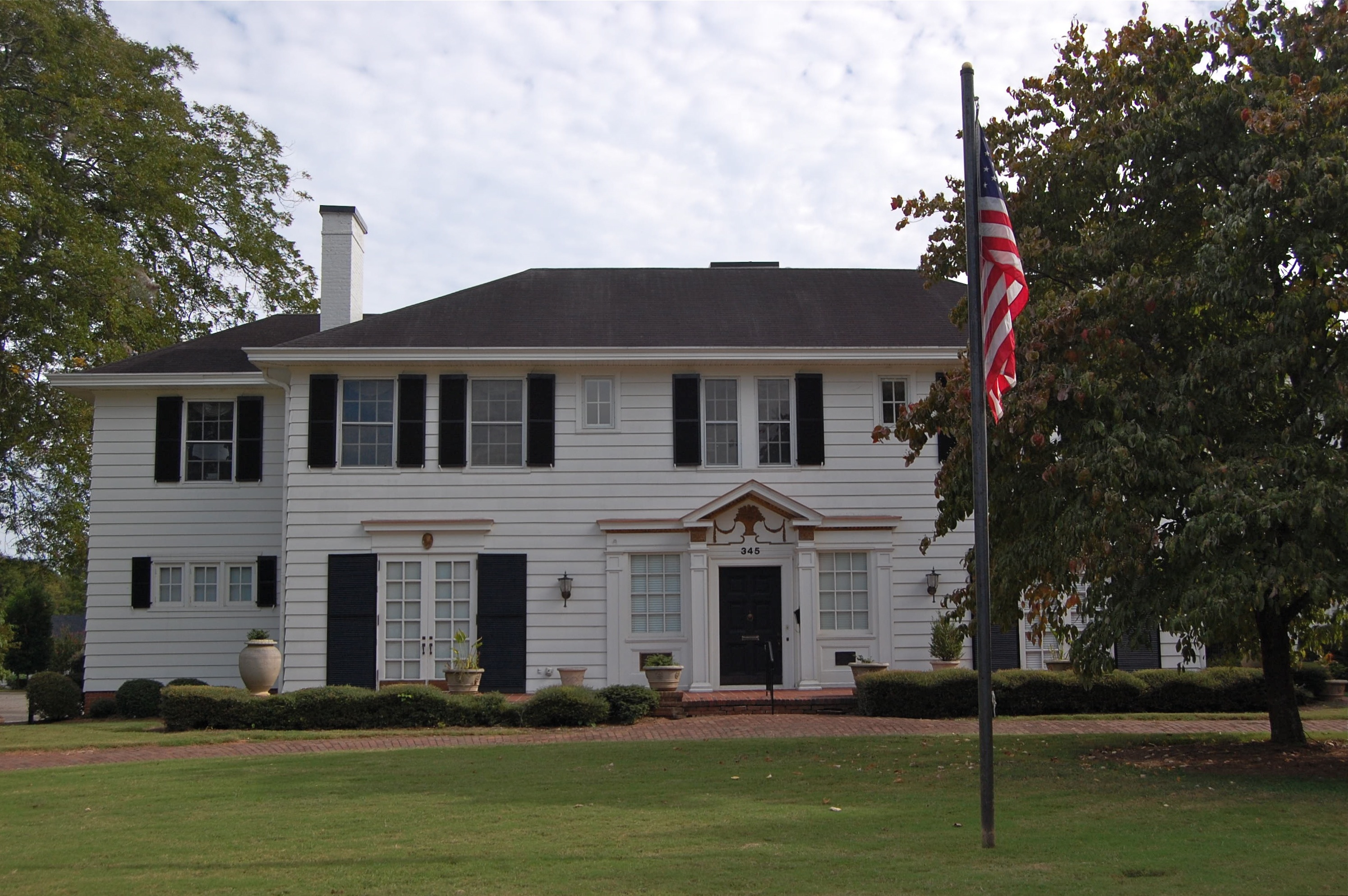
John Q. Allen residence

The John Q. Allen Home was owned by John Quincy Allen (1880–1967), one of five children of Bona Allen Sr. (1846–1925). It is one of seven homes owned by the Allen family in the town of Buford, Georgia. Located at 345 Main Street between the Bona Allen Mansion and the Bona Allen, Jr. home, the John Q. Allen home was built between 1911 and 1912 and is in the Georgian Revival style. It was placed on the National Register of Historic Places in 1984. Its architectural style is Georgian Revival architecture. It was added to the National Register of Historic Places listings in Gwinnett County, Georgia, in 1984.

The Bona Allen Jr. Home:

Before moving into the Bona Allen Mansion in 1925, the oldest Allen son lived in this Greek Revival house, also located on Main Street. It was later occupied by his nephew, Bona Allen III (known as "Little Bona,") son of H. Wadleigh Allen.

The H. Wadleigh Allen Home:

Once located on Sawnee Avenue at the corner of the current Bona Allen Mansion property, this home was built for the fourth Allen son. It was occupied for several years by Golden Knight, brother in law of Bona Allen Jr.. The home, which was demolished in the 1970s, was another Queen Anne Victorian, this one with a pointed turret.

The Victor Allen Estate

Built by Victor Allen (Bona's fifth son) in 1908, this Colonial Revival home was later purchased and completely renovated by Museum of Buford curator, Lynn A. Bowman.

Stonehedge: The Kate Allen Shadburn House

Once believed to have been a wedding gift from her father, this home was owned by Bona Allen's only daughter, Kate, and her husband (and Allen business competitor) Burl Shadburn. Built around 1904, it still stands on Shadburn Avenue and is known for its beautiful gardens.

The Clarence Allen Home There was one other Allen home owned by son, Clarence. It was located on what is now Main Street, but torn down in 1941. No photo is available.

== Sale to Tandy Corporation ==
In 1968 the Bona Allen Tannery was sold to Tandy Corporation, which owned leather goods stores.
