= Kirkwood School =

- U.S. National Register of Historic Places
- U.S. Historic district – Contributing property
- Location within Georgia
- Location: 138 Kirkwood Rd., Atlanta, Georgia
- Coordinates: 33°45′27″N 84°19′20″W
- Area: 2.9 acres (1.2 ha)
- Built: 1906
- Architect: Bruce, Everett and Hayes (1906); et.al.
- Architectural style: Colonial Revival, Modern Movement
- Part of: Kirkwood Historic District
- NRHP reference No.: 02001045
- Added to NRHP: September 19, 2002

The Kirkwood School, at 138 Kirkwood Rd. in the DeKalb County portion of Atlanta, Georgia, USA, is a complex which was a school until 1996, and was listed on the National Register of Historic Places in 2002. The listing included four contributing buildings on 2.9 acres (1.2 ha). It has also been known as Kirkwood Elementary School. It is included in the Kirkwood Historic District.

The original school, built in 1906, was designed by the architects Bruce, Everett and Hayes. The largest building in the campus is the main school building (1922) which was expanded in 1924 and 1928. The campus also includes a cafeteria building (1950) and a library building (1964).

The main Kirkwood school building is a two-story, H-shaped building in the Colonial Revival style, designed by John F. Downing and completed in 1922.

The 1928 expansion added eight classrooms to the north side of the main building, and was designed by G. Lloyd Preacher. It continued the main building's "double-loaded corridor with flanking classrooms" in compatible Colonial Revival style.

Desegregation of the school began in 1965. All eighteen teachers and nearly all of the 500 white students transferred out. In 1967, the Kirkwood neighborhood area became predominantly African American.
