= Marian Apartments (Griffin, Georgia) =

- U.S. National Register of Historic Places
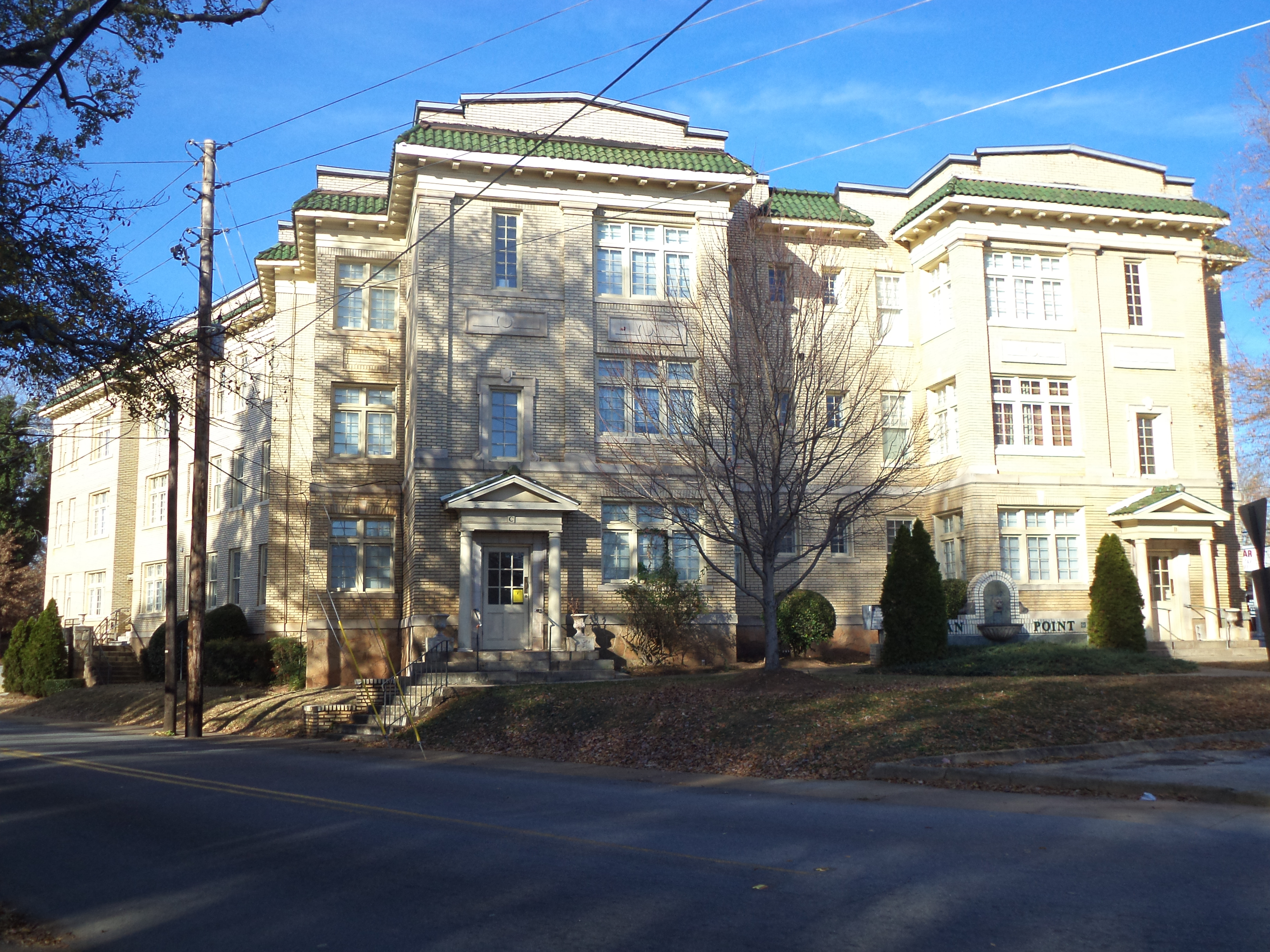

- Location within Georgia
- Location: 400 W. Poplar St., Griffin, Georgia
- Coordinates: 33°14′44″N 84°16′09″W
- Area: less than one acre
- Built: 1919
- Architect: Alexander F.N. Everett
- Architectural style: Renaissance
- NRHP reference No.: 07000936
- Added to NRHP: September 10, 2007

The Marian Apartments in Griffin, Georgia, at 400 W. Poplar St., were built in 1919 and listed on the National Register of Historic Places in 2007.

It was the first building in Griffin to rent out luxury apartments. The building was deemed significant "as an excellent example of an early 20th-century Renaissance Revival-style apartment building designed with luxury "flats" that incorporated modern amenities and were large enough for families. Designed to attract affluent tenants, the Marian incorporated sunrooms and balconies for fresh air and sunlight, white-tile bathrooms, modern kitchens, wood floors, electric lights, and steam heat. The apartments, designed by Atlanta architect Alexander F. N. Everett, are typical of apartments designed in Atlanta in the 191Os and 1920s."

The building was designed by architect Alexander F.N. Everett in Renaissance Revival style.
