= Little Mulberry Indian Mounds =

- Parks-Strickland Archeological Complex
- U.S. National Register of Historic Places
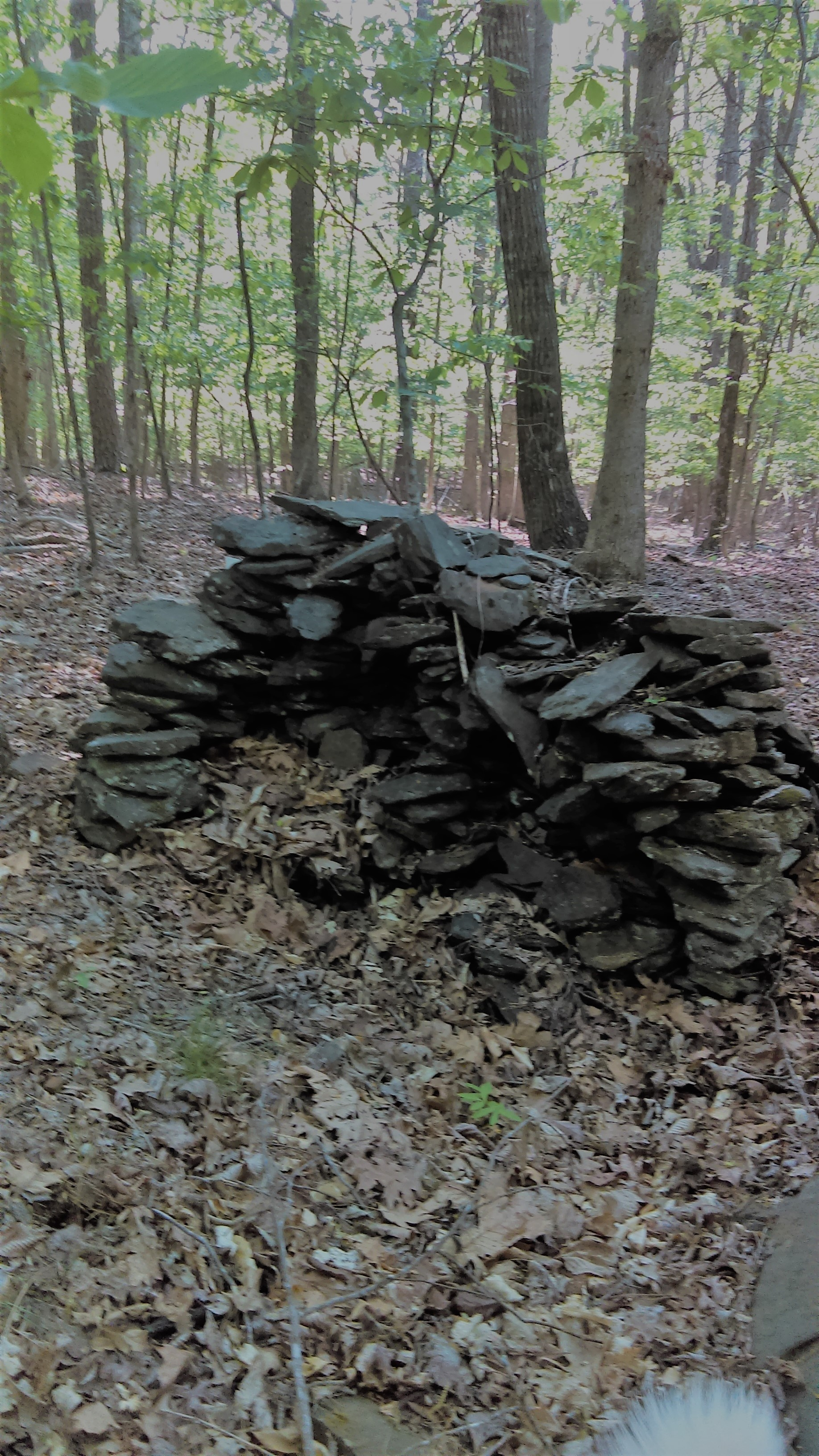
- One of Little Mulberry mounds within the complex

- Location within Georgia Location within the United States
- Nearest city: Dacula, Georgia
- Coordinates: 34°2′32″N 83°53′13″W
- Area: 9.5 acres (3.8 ha)
- NRHP reference No.: 89002034
- Added to NRHP: December 8, 1989

The Little Mulberry Indian Mounds are a series of carefully stacked rock piles located in Little Mulberry Park, Dacula, Georgia. In 1990, archeologist, Patrick H. Garrow counted 200 of these stone mounds while surveying the land ahead of a proposed golf course residential development. The stone piles are typically circular or semicircular in shape. Most of those that have been examined archaeologically have revealed no cultural artifacts beyond the stone structure, while a few have been found to have historical 19th-century artifacts underneath them.

A subset of the area, part of its early identification, was listed on the National Register of Historic Places as the Parks-Strickland Archeological Complex. There continues to be scholarly dispute over the function and significance of the structures, although Native American tribes historically associated with the region claim them to have funerary significance.

== See also ==
- National Register of Historic Places listings in Gwinnett County, Georgia
