= John F. Downing =

American architect

John F. Downing was an American architect based in Atlanta, Georgia.

He designed the main building of the Kirkwood School in Atlanta, in 1922. His father was the noted Atlanta architect, Walter T. Downing. "John worked in his father's office during summer vacations and after his father's death in 1918, continued his architectural practice. He designed several schools in Atlanta, as well as the Cyclorama Museum and Bona Allen Office Building. Downing also lived and worked in Miami, Boston, and Memphis."

He was a student at the Columbia University School of Architecture.
