= Selig Company Building =

- U.S. National Register of Historic Places
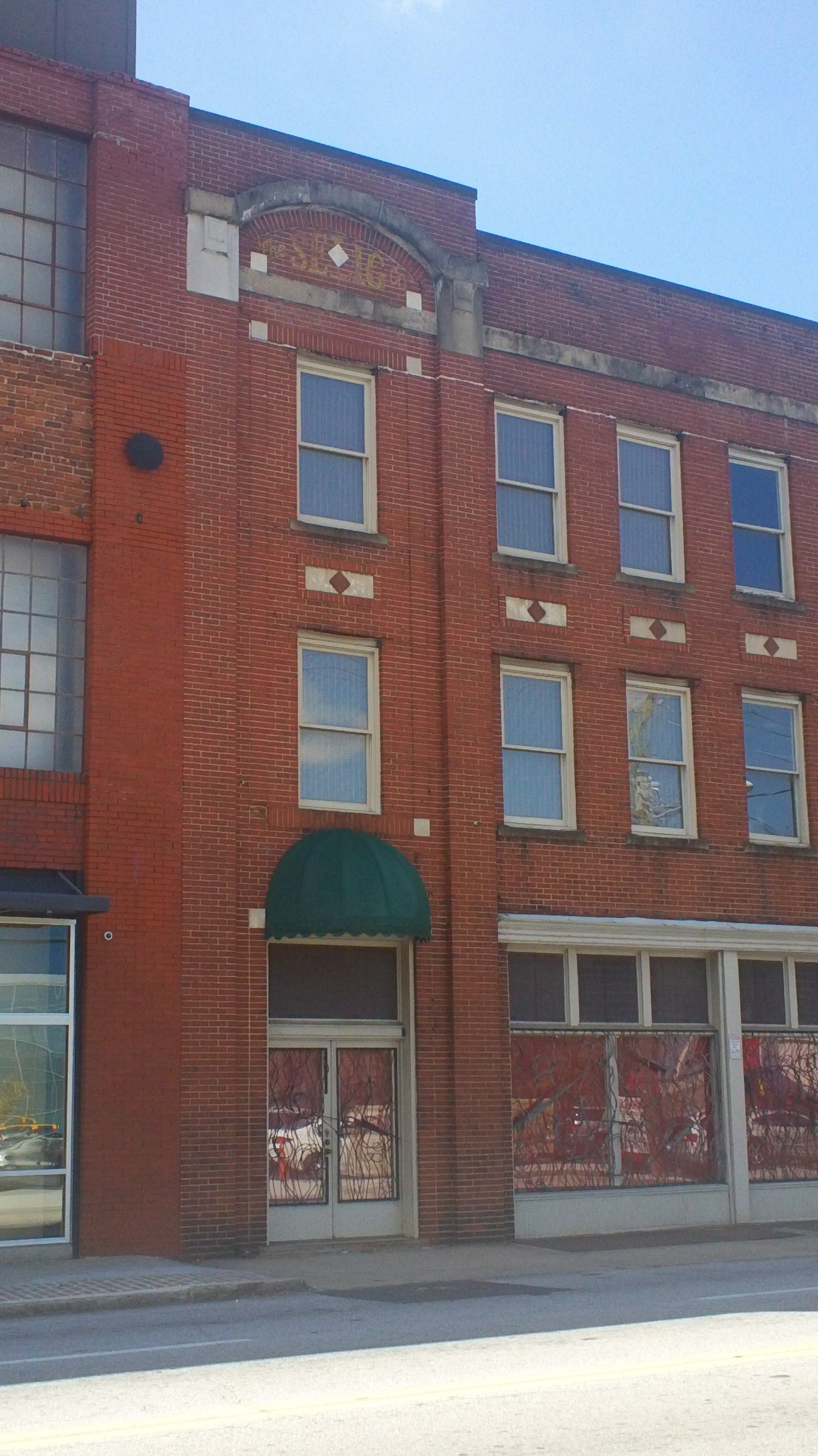

- Location within Georgia
- Location: 330--346 Marietta St., Atlanta, Georgia
- Coordinates: 33°45′43″N 84°23′49″W
- Area: less than one acre
- Built: 1915, 1925
- Architect: Alexander F.N. Everett
- Architectural style: Early Commercial
- NRHP reference No.: 96000158
- Added to NRHP: February 22, 1996

The Selig Company Building, at 330-346 Marietta St. in Atlanta, Georgia, was built in 1915 and 1925. It was listed on the National Register of Historic Places in 1996.

It is a four-story commercial building designed by architect Alexander F. N. Everett in Early Commercial style. It has also been known as the Pioneer Neon Building. Its eastern half was built in 1915, and the western half was built in 1925. It is on the south side of Marietta St., with its own south side on a double railroad track of the Southern Railway line.

It was built for the Selig Chemical Company, "which was founded in the late 1800s by legendary Atlanta businessman Simon Selig. The company engaged primarily in the manufacture and sale of home-cleaning products (soaps, dispensers, disinfectants, and other cleaning agents), insecticides, and other consumer goods. Mr. Selig built his company into one of the largest of its type in the country and now it forms the nucleus of one of Atlanta's most successful corporations, National Service Industries, Inc. The company, no longer the owner of this building, is celebrating its centennial in 1996 and has published a history of the company. / The association of the building with the Selig Chemical Company is very strong; when viewing the facade facing Marietta Street, one can see "Selig Company" printed under the left limestone/concrete arches. In addition, the interior dividing wall of the building includes a well-preserved former outdoor wall sign advertising the Selig Chemical Company's products. The exterior of the building along the railroad tracks also carries numerous Selig Company signs."

It was owned by the Selig family until 1965, when they sold it to Ira Weiss, owner of the Pioneer Neon Supply Co.
