= Kirkwood Historic District =

- U.S. National Register of Historic Places
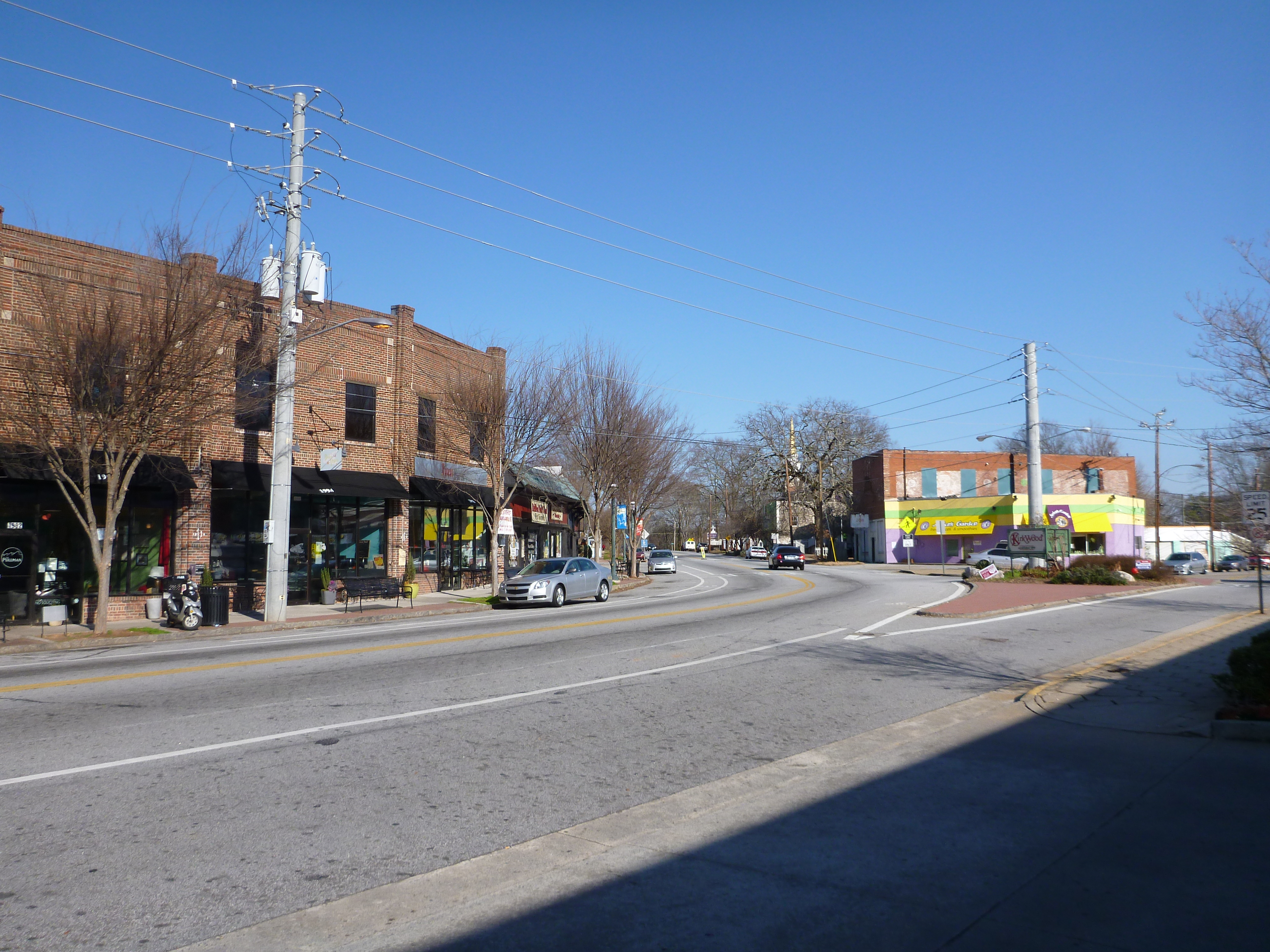

- Location within Georgia
- Location: Roughly bounded by Memorial Dr., Montgomery St., Hosea Williams Dr., Rogers St., CSX RR., & city limits, Atlanta, Georgia
- Coordinates: 33°45′02″N 84°20′02″W
- Area: 850 acres (3.4 km^{2})
- Built: 1870
- Architect: Bruce, Everett and Hayes, others
- Architectural style: Queen Anne, Colonial Revival, Classical Revival
- NRHP reference No.: 09000749
- Added to NRHP: September 24, 2009

The Kirkwood Historic District, in the Kirkwood neighborhood of Atlanta, Georgia, is a large historic district which was listed on the National Register of Historic Places in 2009. The district included 1788 contributing buildings, a contributing structure, and three contributing sites on 850 acres (3.4 km^{2}).

It includes the Kirkwood School (1906), designed by Bruce, Everett and Hayes, which was already separately listed on the National Register.

The district is roughly bounded by Memorial Dr., Montgomery St., Hosea Williams Dr., Rogers St., CSX RR., & city limits.

It includes Queen Anne, Colonial Revival, and Classical Revival architecture, and includes residential and commercial and government buildings.

Historic subfunction: Single Dwelling; Multiple Dwelling; Specialty Store; Restaurant; Meeting Hall; Post Office; School
