= St. Nicholas Hotel (Albany, Georgia) =

- U.S. National Register of Historic Places
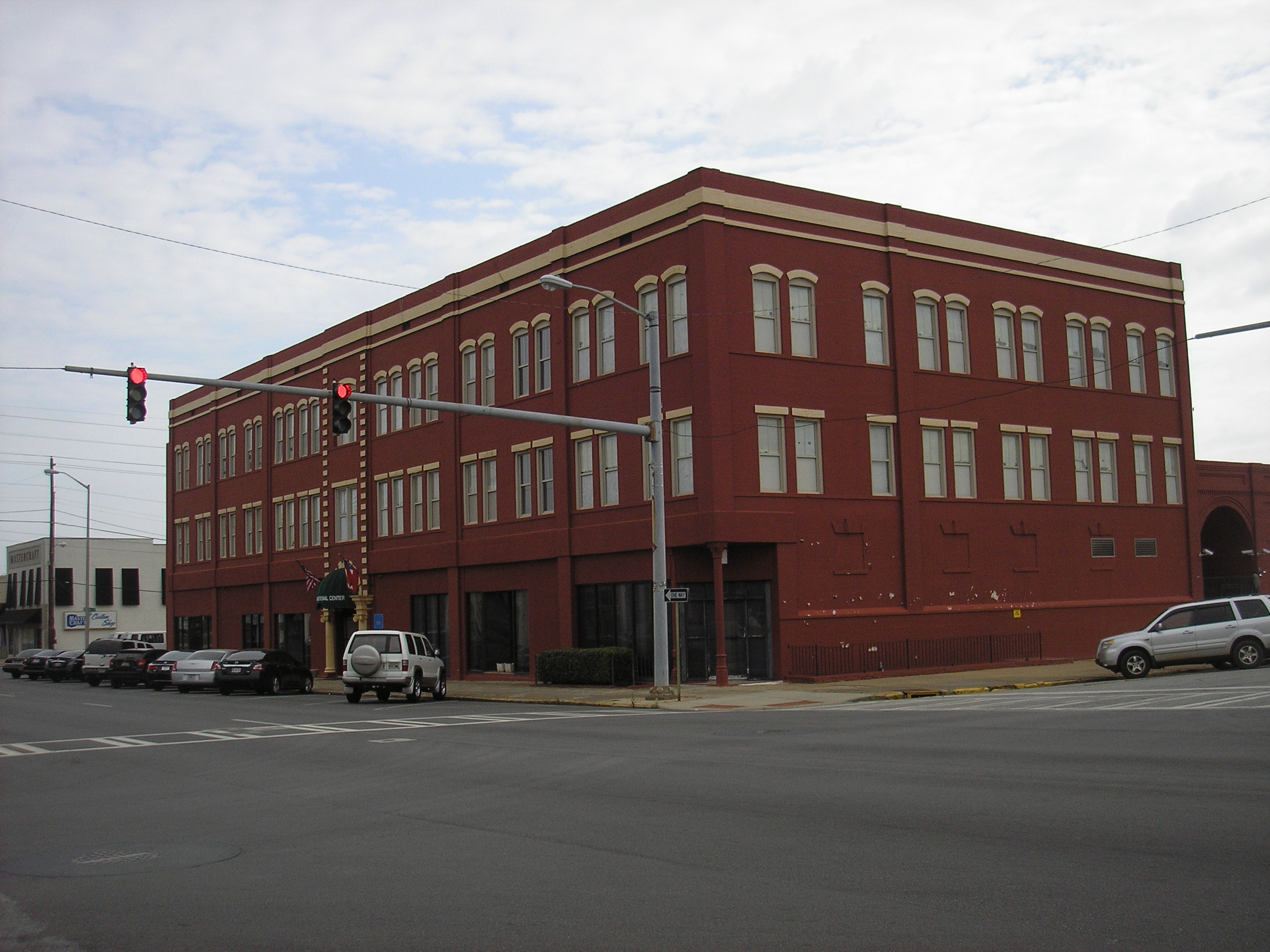

- Location within Georgia
- Location: 141 Flint Ave., 300-310 Washington St., Albany, Georgia
- Coordinates: 31.58021°N 84.15133°W
- Area: less than one acre
- Built: 1908
- Architect: Bruce & Everett
- Architectural style: Early Commercial
- NRHP reference No.: 91001851
- Added to NRHP: December 19, 1991

The St. Nicholas Hotel in Albany, Georgia, at 141 Flint Ave. or 300-310 Washington St., was built in 1908. It was listed on the National Register of Historic Places in 1991.Reopened in 2026

It was designed by architects Bruce & Everett (a partnership of Alexander C. Bruce and Alexander F. N. Everett) in Early Commercial style. It has also been known as the Lee Hotel.

It originally had a canopy at the front, but this was lost in a tornado on February 10, 1940, and not replaced. The hotel was severely damaged in the tornado, was rebuilt and reopened in 1941 as the Lee Hotel.

It was the birthplace of bandleader Harry James in 1916.
