= Harbins Park =

Park in Dacula, Georgia, United States

Coordinates: 33°54′14″N 83°51′05″W

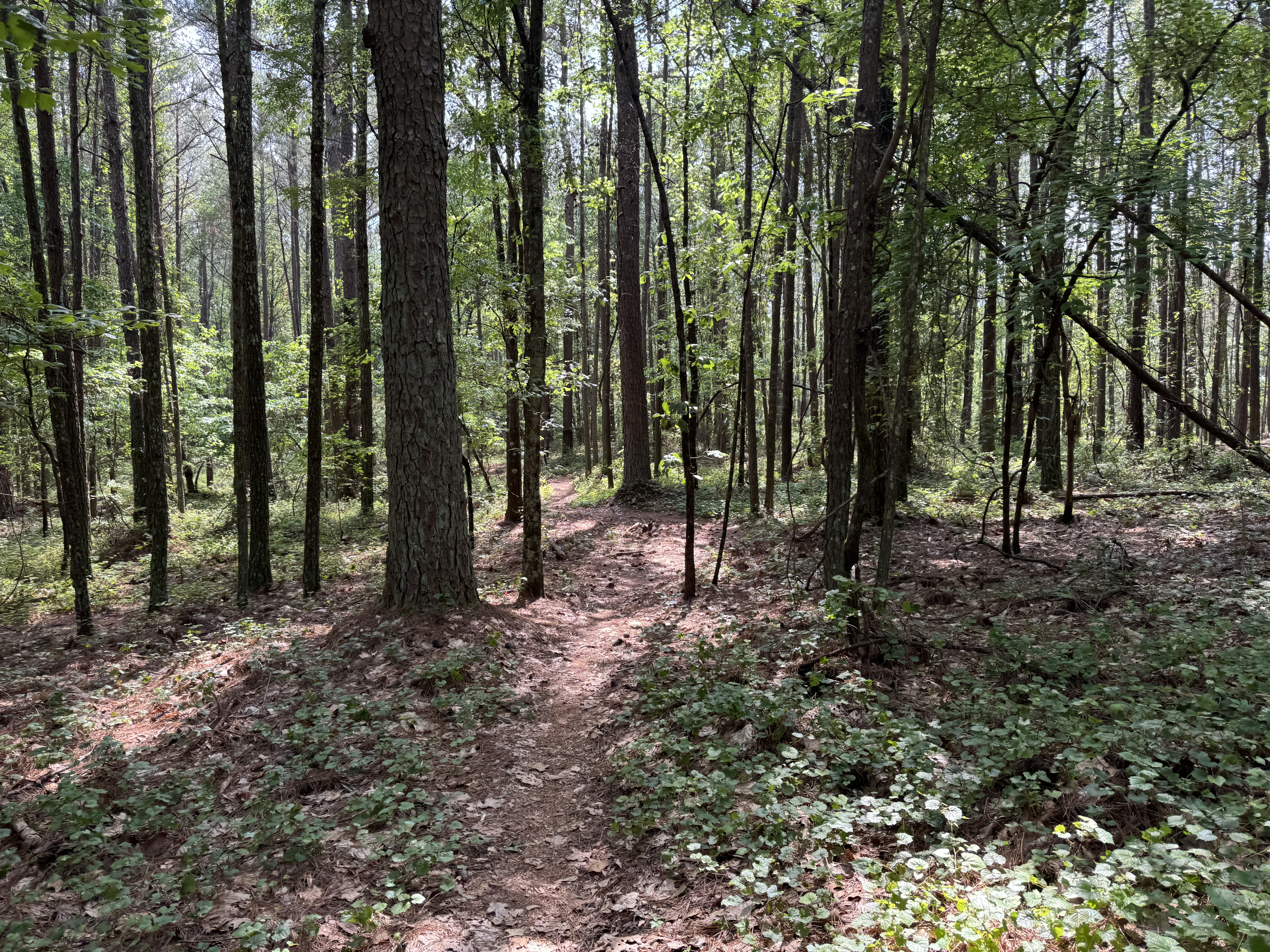
Mountain biking trail in Harbins Park

Harbins Park is a park located in Dacula, Georgia. The park was built in 2009 and completed in 2012. The park has a total area of 1290 acres, with 24.5 miles of trails. The park is open from sunrise to sunset.

== Trails and amenities ==
Harbins Park has 3 entrances: the park entrance, the equestrian entrance, and the football/multi purpose entrance. The park also has a 4.3-mile paved a multi-purpose trail, a 7-mile equestrian trail, a 13-mile mountain biking trail, and a 4.5-mile hiking trail. The park has playgrounds, pavilions, grills, restrooms, equestrian trailer parking, a football/multi-purpose field with a walking track, a dog park area, a river channel, a lake, a seven-field baseball/softball complex, and a football field.
