= Elisha Winn House =

Historic house in Georgia, United States

- U.S. National Register of Historic Places
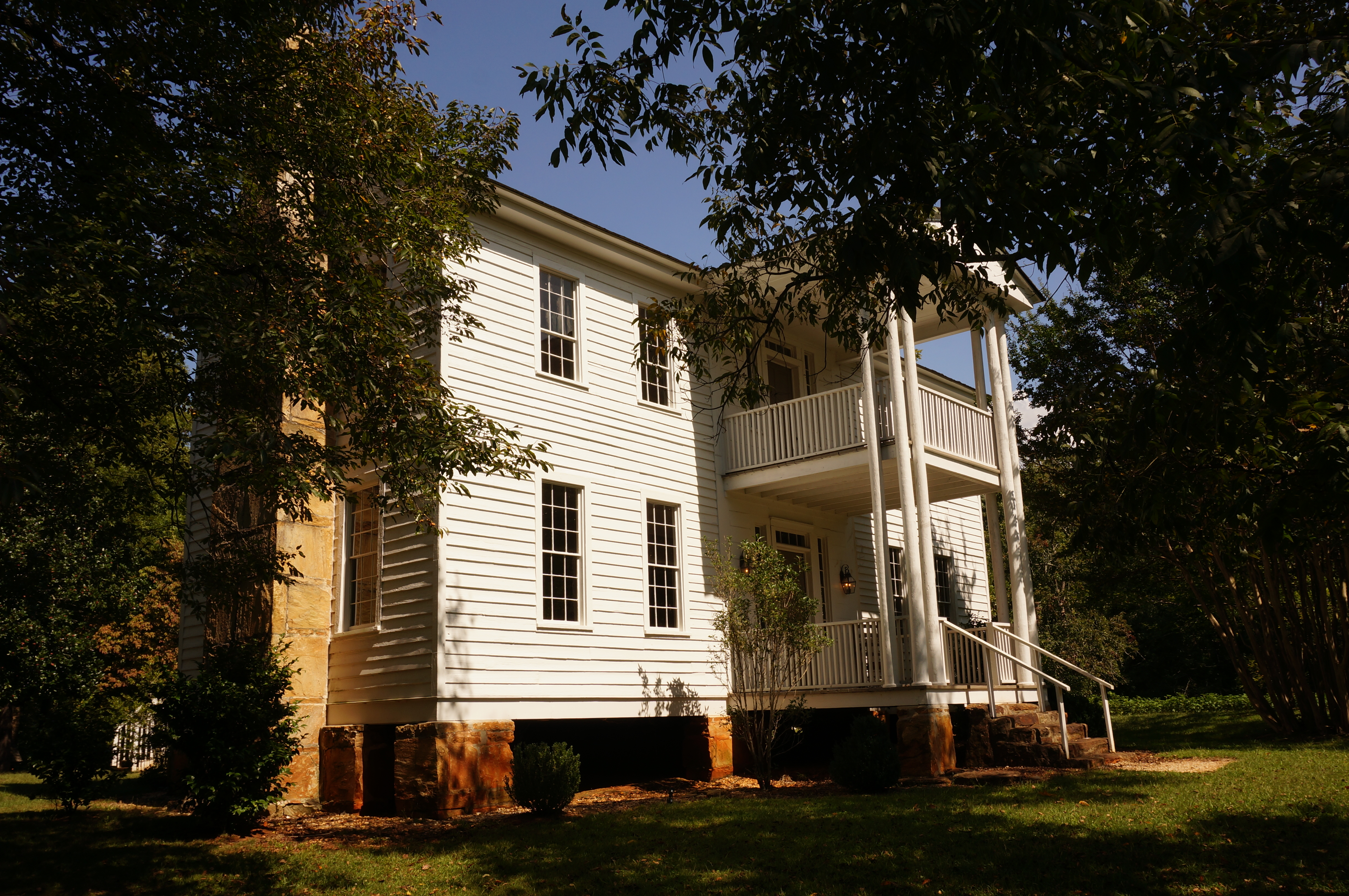

- Location within Metro Atlanta Location within Georgia Location within the United States
- Nearest city: Dacula, Georgia
- Coordinates: 34.02345°N 83.90821°W
- Built: 1812
- Architectural style: Plantation-Plain
- NRHP reference No.: 79000728
- Added to NRHP: December 18, 1979

The Elisha Winn House is located at 908 Dacula Road near Dacula, Georgia, United States, 1.9 miles (3.1 km) north of Dacula city limits. The house, currently in Gwinnett County, was built in 1812, six years before the county was established. In 1809, Elisha Winn, Roger Pugh, and Elijah Pugh purchased 7,300 acres (30 km^{2}) on the Apalachee River from a Jackson County tax collector. On December 15, 1818, the Elisha Winn house and the property became part of Gwinnett County. The house is the oldest surviving building in Gwinnett and probably the oldest building in metropolitan Atlanta.

== History ==
Being part of the newly formed county of Gwinnett, the Elisha Winn house gained historical significance. This is where much of the planning for the new county took place. Gwinnett county government functions were first carried out in the house and the backyard. Early sessions of the Superior Court (1819–1822), serving several other counties including Gwinnett County, were held in Winn's barn on the third floor. The first enslaved person sold in Gwinnett county was auctioned here, a six-year-old boy named Isham. The Inferior Court and the first county elections were held in the parlor of the Elisha Winn House. In 1819, Gwinnett County had a full slate of elected county officials. The first Gwinnett County jail was built on the property, the jail was a small barn in the backyard, which was demolished in August 1933. County executions also took place at this location, the first being Jack Winn, an enslaved person owned by Elisha Winn, who was tried and hanged on property. Also, the first five judges of the Inferior Court, including Elisha Winn, were commissioned in February 1819. In 1820, the newly created Lawrenceville, became the permanent setting for the seat of government. A wooded courthouse was erected and the county government moved there. The Winn family moved to Lawrenceville in 1824 where Elisha Winn had a seat in the county government in the permanent setting of the Gwinnett County Court house.

== Elisha Winn ==
Elisha Winn was born in Lunenburg, Virginia in 1777, and died on March 4, 1842, and is buried in the old Lawrenceville cemetery. He was married to Judith Cochran and had 13 children. From 1815 to 1817, Winn was Justice of Inferior Court in Jackson County. From 1820 to 1825, he was an Inferior Court judge for Gwinnett County. He was a state senator for Georgia from Gwinnett during the 1830, 1833, and 1837 sessions.

== Other buildings onsite ==
- The original barn, which was used as Gwinnett County's first courthouse and jail, was torn down in 1945. The original timbers and lumber were used to build another barn. The second barn was wired for electricity in 1982, but completely collapsed in 1997. It was 32 feet (9.8 m) square and had two floors and an attic.
- Lawrenceville Jail is a log jail built in 1820s in Lawrenceville. It was donated in 1986 and was moved to the location of the original county jail, which was demolished in August 1933. The new jail is similar in size and construction to the original jail . The most famous individuals held in the original jail were the Moravian missionaries involved in Cherokee Nation v Georgia, including Samuel Worcester, while they were awaiting trial in Lawrenceville in 1831.
- The cotton house was donated to the historical society in 2001 and was moved to the Winn property in 2002.
- Walnut Grove School was a one-room school built in 1875. Original located on Highway 124 was moved to several other locations before being donated to the historical society in 1985 and placed in the backyard of the Winn house. The society restored the school to its 1875 appearance.
- Clack Blacksmith Shop was donated in 2000 by Donald S. Bickers, M.D. The building was built in 1910.
- The Outhouse was donated in 2001. A historical society member used the model of the original version to create a new outhouse made from original wood and some from the donated outhouse.

== Annual Elisha Winn Fair ==
There is an annual Elisha Winn fair on the first weekend of every October. The fair is sponsored by the Gwinnett Historical Society as a fundraiser to keep the house in good shape. October 6 and 7, 2012 was the 34th annual fair and the 200th anniversary of the house.

The house is listed on the National Register of Historic Places and a Georgia Historic Marker is located at the site.
