= Freeman's Mill =

Historic mill and park in Dacula, Georgia

- U.S. National Register of Historic Places
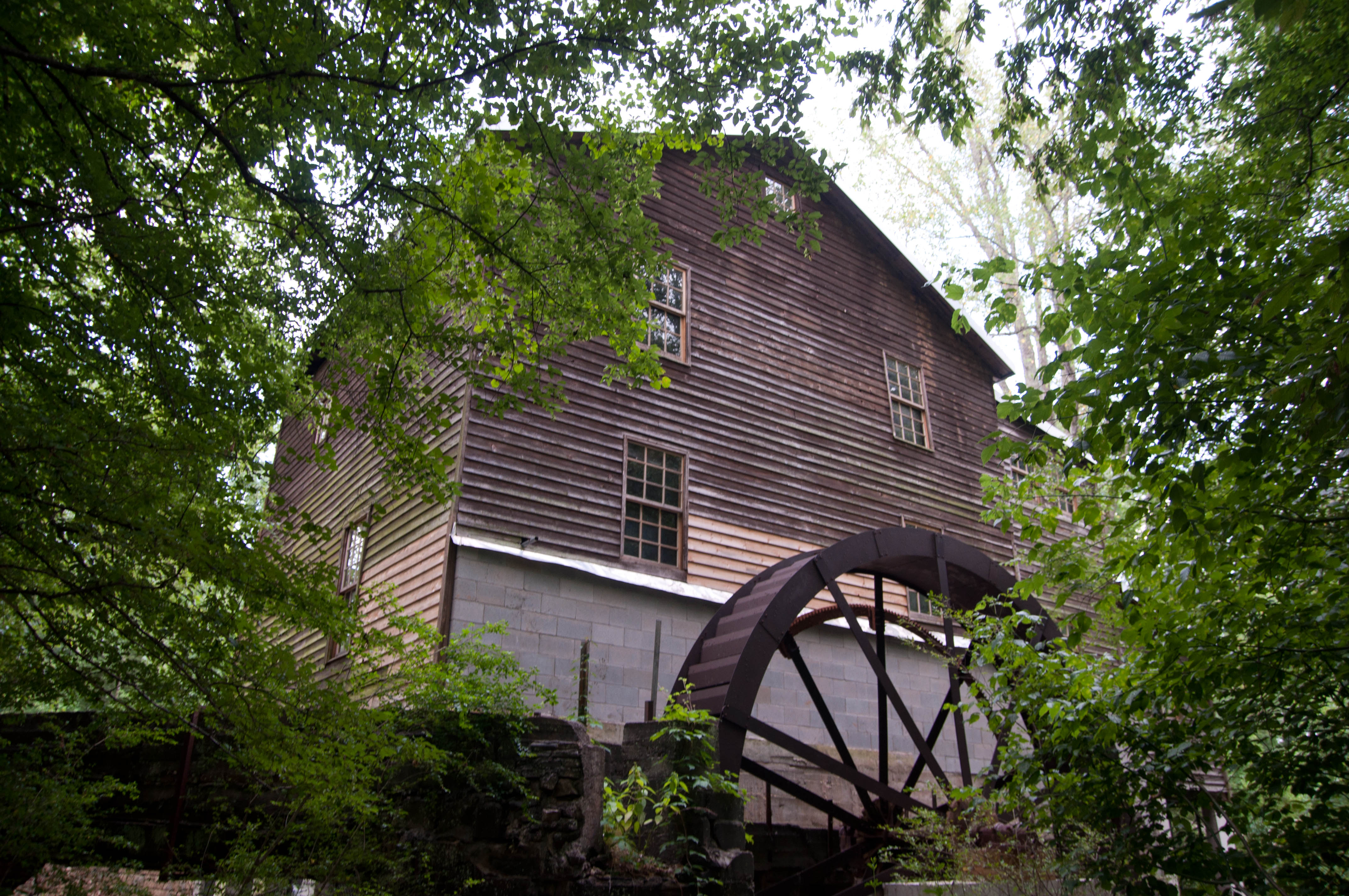

- Location within Metro Atlanta Location within Georgia Location within the United States
- Nearest city: Dacula, Georgia
- Coordinates: 33.96352°N 83.92646°W
- Built: between 1868 and 1879
- NRHP reference No.: 98000885
- Added to NRHP: July 23, 1998

Freeman's Mill, also known as Alcovy Road Grist Mill or Swann's Mill, is a historic restored gristmill located on the east side of the Alcovy River in Dacula, Georgia.

== History ==
The mill was constructed between 1868 and 1879 by John Griffin and Levi J. Loveless. Subsequent owners included W. Scott Freeman, his son Winfield, and Newt Pharr. The mill operated into the 1980s, making it one of the last operating gristmills in the county. In the 1990s, the mill was purchased by Gwinnett County and was restored in 2009. The mill was listed on the U.S. National Register of Historic Places in 1998.

Originally, a miller's house was located just east of the mill but was destroyed by fire in the 1990s. The millstones were significant features, originally 48 inches in diameter, now 36 inches and weighing approximately 1,000 pounds each. The original wooden waterwheel was replaced with a historic breaststroke-type wheel, 20 feet high and 3 feet wide, running "backwards" with an 18-foot gear. The wooden dam was replaced circa 1910 with a shaped stone dam. A stone wall and series of gates and channels were added in 1946 to improve water control.

The site includes the mill and the area around it, encompassing the mill, its dam, and a portion of the Alcovy River.

== Architecture ==
The mill is a two-and-one-half story wood-framed structure with major floor beams and some vertical corner posts made of large hand-hewn timbers. The building is constructed with rough-hewn timber, and major structural members are mortised and tenoned together, while others are nailed with square-cut nails. The building frame is of hand-hewn timbers in a mortise-and-tenon construction joined by wooden pegs. The mill has a square shape with a lean-to addition (1955) on the southwest end; half of the lean-to section is two stories high, while the other portion is one story. The mill rests on a stone and concrete foundation, with weatherboard exterior and a roof replaced in 1947. The mill race's larger section was enhanced with a stone wall and spillway features, including a cement overflow area added in the late 1940s.

Original Dutch doors, double-hung windows on the first floor, and fixed nine-light windows on the second floor are notable features.

The interior equipment, except for the wheat stones, remains intact, and the mill could resume operation with minimal effort.

== Park ==
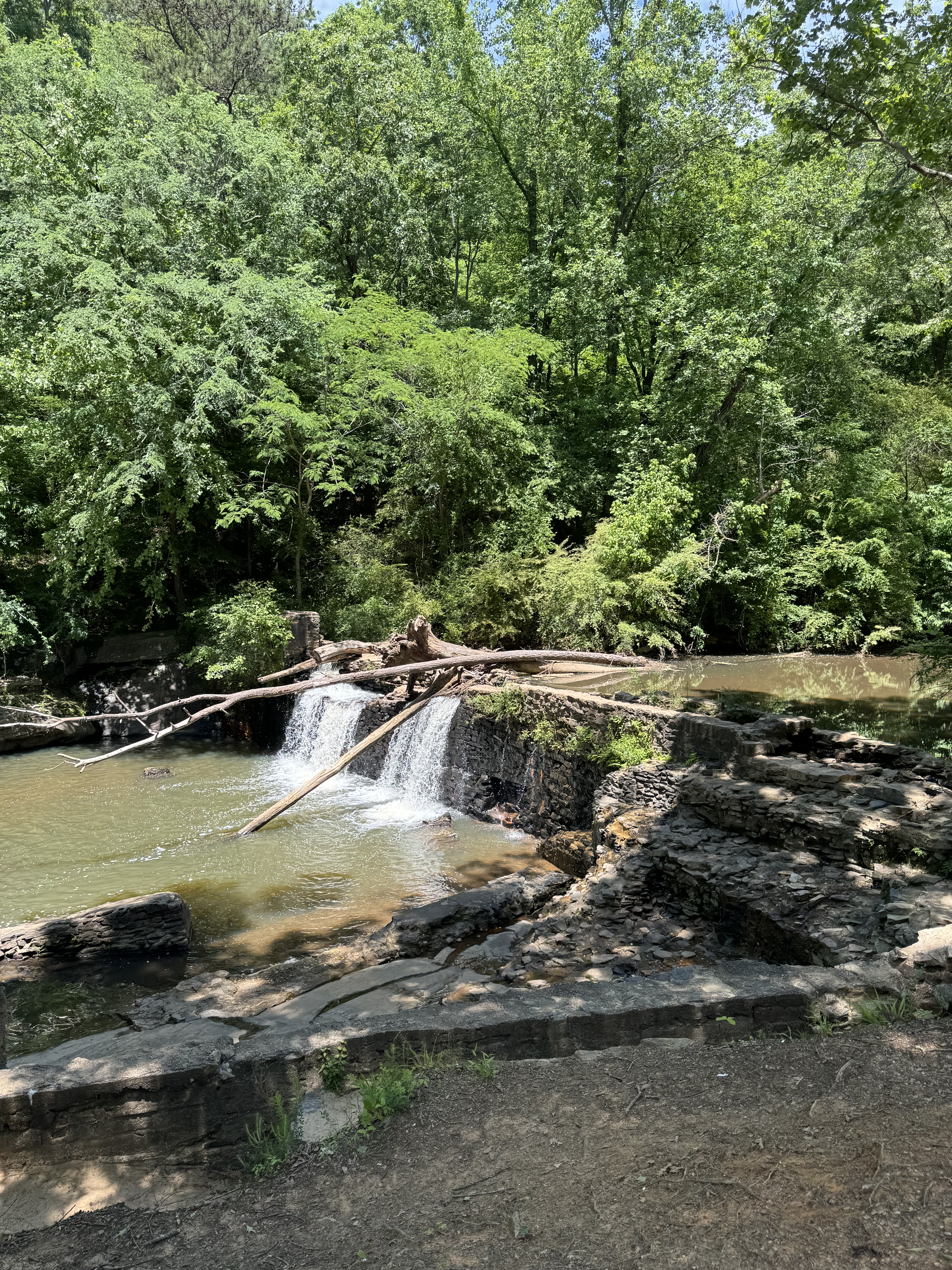
The dam at Freeman's Mill

Soon after the restoration of the mill, a park was built surrounding it. Freeman's Mill Park has a playground, 0.5-mile paved multi-purpose trail, and restrooms. The park is managed by Gwinnett County Parks.
