= Bona Allen Shoe and Horse Collar Factory =

- U.S. National Register of Historic Places
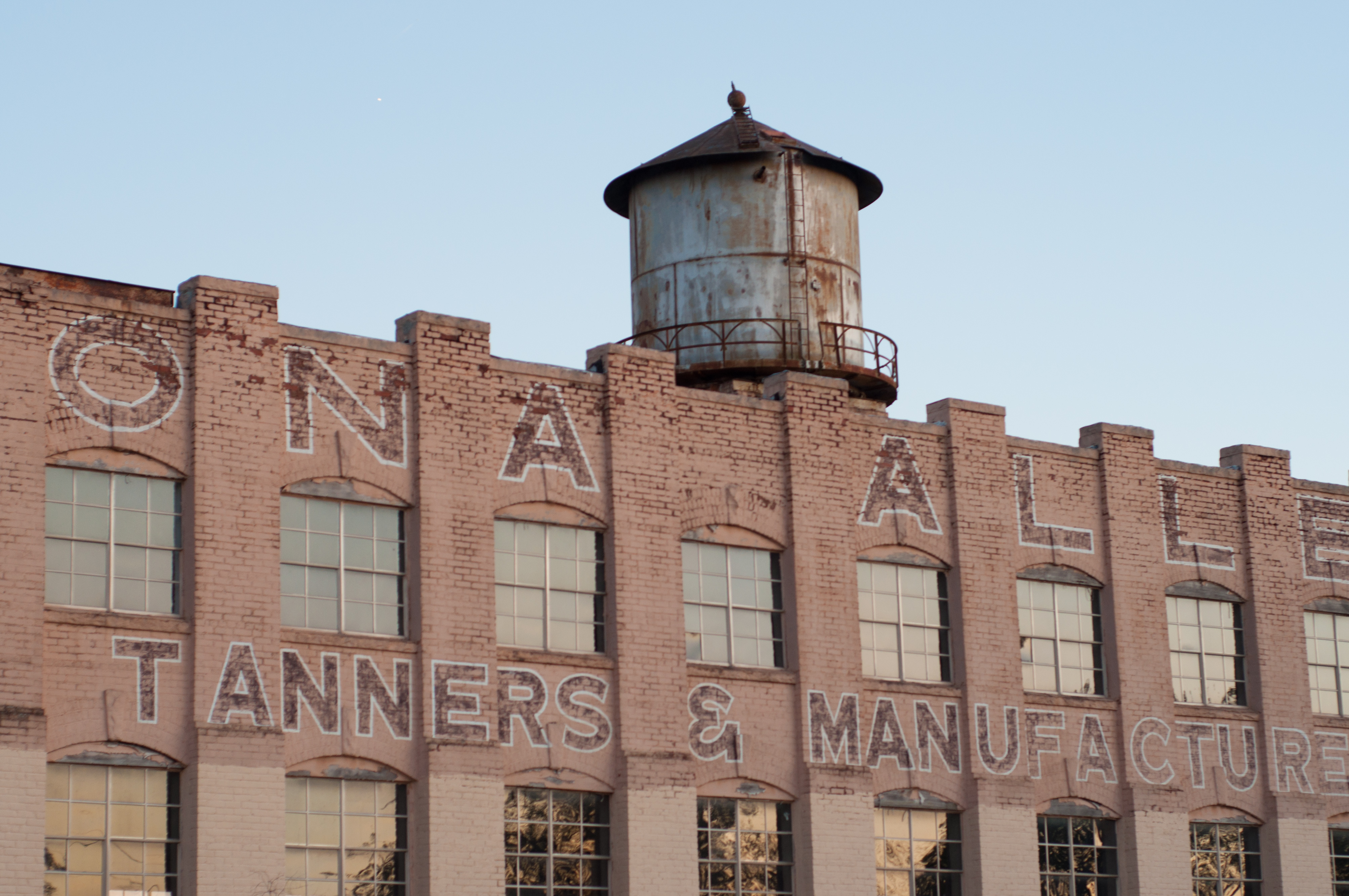
- Bona Allen Tanners and Manufacturers building

- Location within Georgia
- Location: 554 W. Main St., Buford, Georgia
- Coordinates: 34°06′50″N 84°00′43″W
- Area: 6 acres (2.4 ha)
- Built: 1905
- Architectural style: Early 20th Cent. Industrial
- NRHP reference No.: 04001138
- Added to NRHP: January 3, 2005

The Bona Allen Shoe and Horse Collar Factory, is a historic business location in Buford, Georgia. It was added to the National Register of Historic Places on January 3, 2005. It is located at 554 West Main Street.

It was the main factory building of the Bona Allen Company.

== See also ==
- National Register of Historic Places listings in Gwinnett County, Georgia
