= William Terrell Homeplace =

Historic house in Georgia, United States

- U.S. National Register of Historic Places
- Location within Georgia Location within the United States
- Nearest city: Lawrenceville, Georgia
- Coordinates: 33.966389°N 83.966111°W
- Area: 29 acres (12 ha)
- Built: c. 1827
- Architectural style: Plantation-Plain
- NRHP reference No.: 82002423
- Added to NRHP: August 26, 1982

The William Terrell Homeplace in Gwinnett County, Georgia near Lawrenceville is a historic site which was listed on the National Register of Historic Places in 1982.

It was a two-story Plantation Plain-style plantation house, which in 1982 was the sole house on a 29 acres (12 ha) property. The house was built around 1827. It included Federal-style details including in its mantelpiece.

Around 1862 the house, then on an 870 acres (350 ha) tract, was inherited by William's wife's son, a lawyer named Kenan T. Terrell (1826–1884). Kenan was a Justice of the Inferior Court of Gwinnett County before the American Civil War. During the war he served as a captain in the Confederate army. After the war, he continued on the plantation with cotton, corn, and sugar cane crops. He was appointed to the county board of education in 1876, and was otherwise active in county affairs.

Another contributing structure on the property was included in the listing.

Some information for the listing was provided by C. Larry Mabrey, the owner in 1981 who was a step-great-great grandson of William Terrell and who was renovating the house. The house had always been occupied by Terrell descendants.

The house unfortunately was largely destroyed in a fire on April 12, 1987.

It appears that the remains were demolished; its former location appears to be within what is now the Timber Gate neighborhood or housing development, which does not include any such historic house.
