= Dacula, Georgia =

Dacula, Georgia Chinquapin Grove
- City
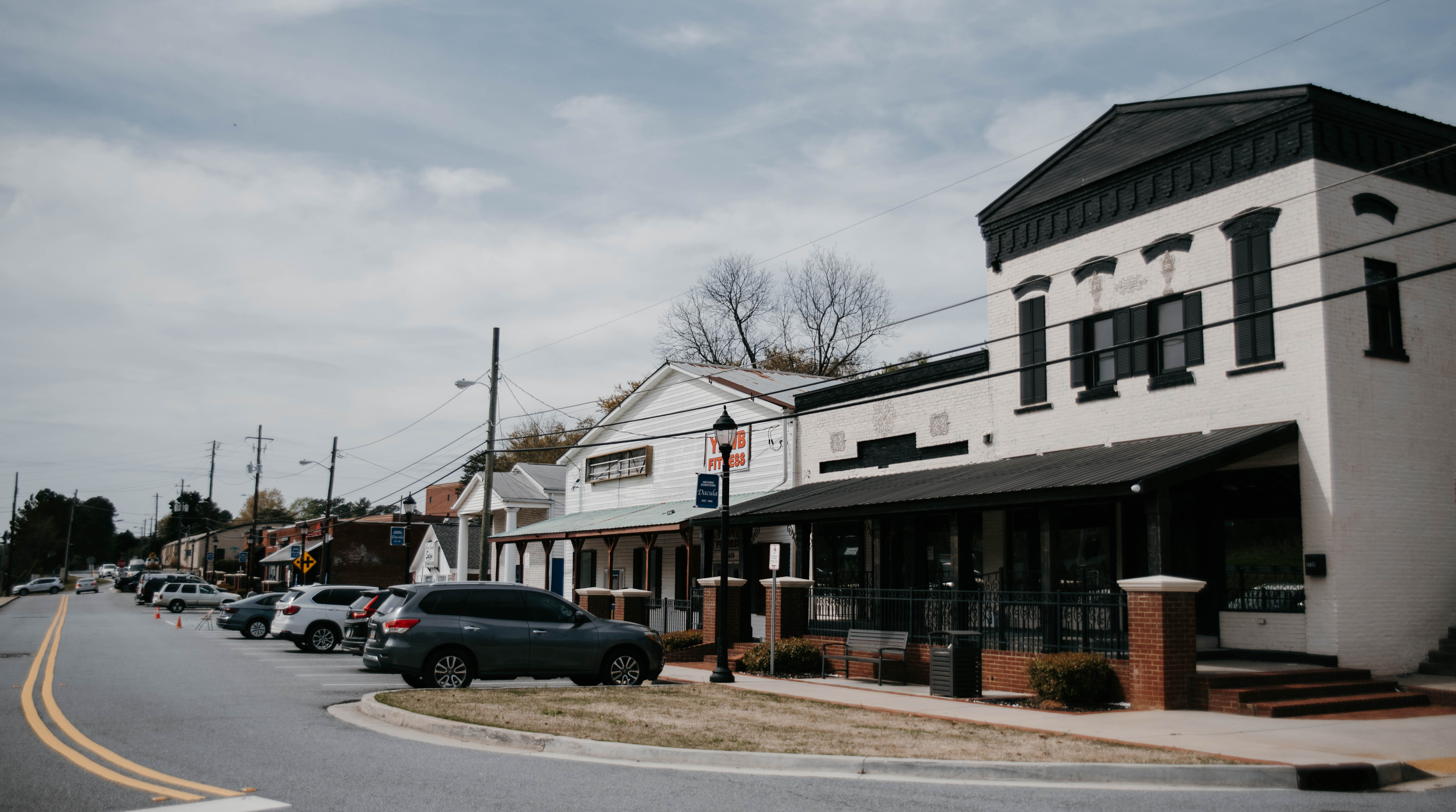
- Dacula, Georgia

- Flag Seal
- Motto: "Honoring Our Past, Building Our Future "
- Location in Gwinnett County and the state of Georgia
- Coordinates: 33°58′53″N 83°53′43″W
- Country: United States
- State: Georgia
- County: Gwinnett

Government
  - Mayor: Trey King

Area
  - Total: 5.45 sq mi (14.11 km^{2})
  - Land: 5.42 sq mi (14.03 km^{2})
  - Water: 0.031 sq mi (0.08 km^{2})
- Elevation: 1,122 ft (342 m)

Population (2020)
  - Total: 6,882
  - Density: 1,504.7/sq mi (580.97/km^{2})
- Time zone: UTC-5 (Eastern (EST))
  - Summer (DST): UTC-4 (EDT)
- ZIP code: 30019
- Area code: 770
- FIPS code: 13-21184
- GNIS feature ID: 2404173
- Website: daculaga.gov

Dacula (/dəˈkjuːlə/ də-KEW-lə) is a city in Gwinnett County, Georgia, United States, located approximately 37 miles (60 km) northeast of Atlanta. As of the 2020 census, Dacula had a population of 6,882. In July, 2025, the U.S. Census Bureau estimated its population was 9,373. The Dacula area is home to some of the oldest buildings in northeast Georgia, such as the Elisha Winn House, which originally acted as the courthouse for Gwinnett County.

== History ==
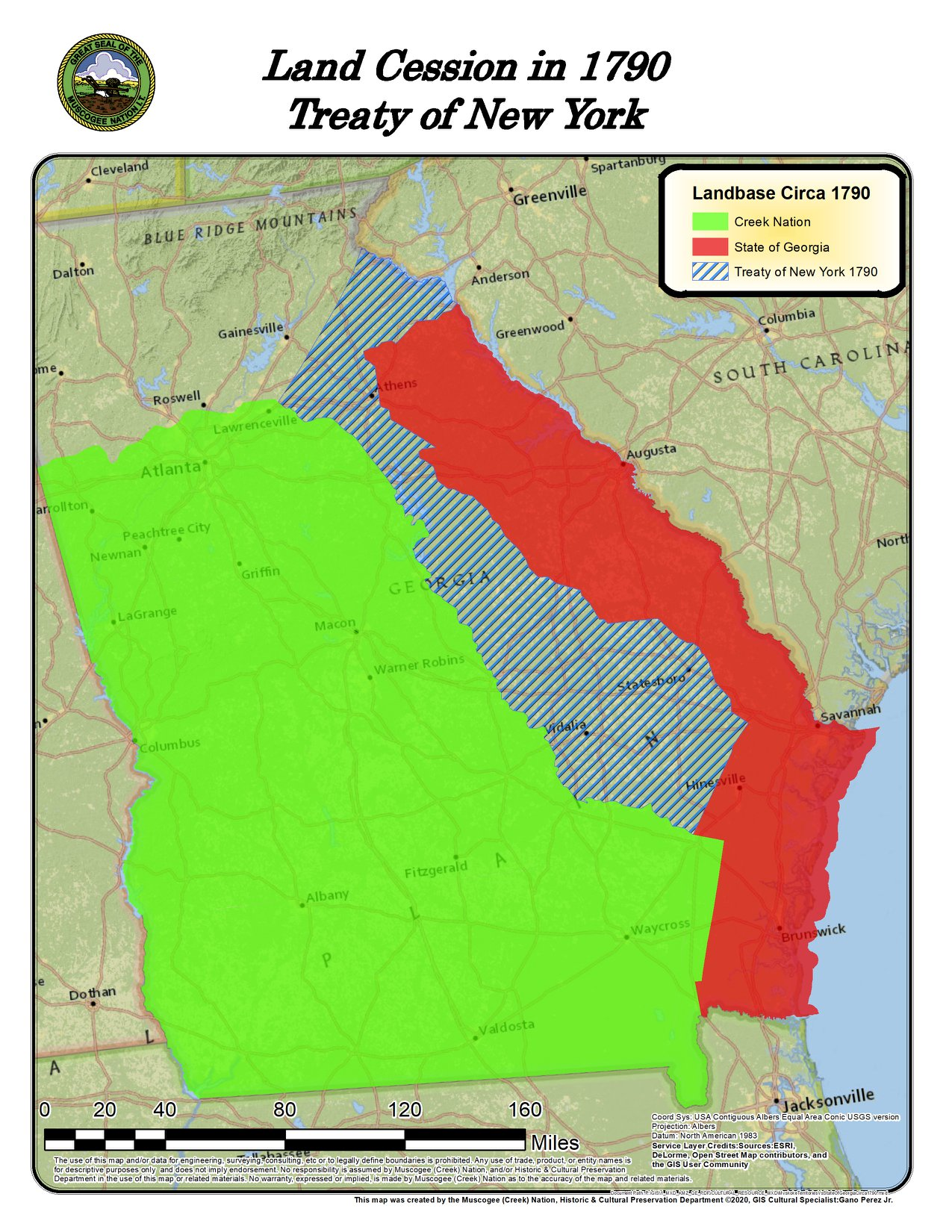
A delegation of Muscogee (Creek) Leaders signed the first treaty between the Creek Nation and the United States. The 1790 Treaty of New York. Henry Knox, Secretary of War, negotiated on behalf of the United States while the primary negotiator for the Muscogee (Creek) Nation is said to have been Alexander McGillivray.

=== Muscogee (Creek) Nation ===
The Dacula area was originally within the Muscogee (Creek) Nation. Most of the land within the city's limits was ceded to the State of Georgia in the 1790 Treaty of New York after the Oconee Wars. The vicinity of Dacula was one of the first areas in northeast Georgia to be occupied by white European settlers (around the time of the War of 1812). The area remained mostly uncolonized until the late 20th century, in part, due to the remaining presence of the Cherokee Nation in portions of Gwinnett County. After settlers lobbied for the ethnic cleansing of the Nation, the Trail of Tears (through the Indian Removal Act) made it easier for Dacula and the unannexed portions of Gwinnett to be settled.

=== Chinquapin Grove ===
Dacula itself began in the late 1800s under the name of Chinquapin Grove (Chinquapin was spelled several different ways), where Dacula Elementary now stands. Chinquapin comes from the indigenous Powhatan word for dwarf chestnut tree (Allegheny Chinkapin). The tree is no longer found in the area due to chestnut blight. An 1865 United States Coast Survey Map shows the town of Chinquepin Grove. An 1883 George Cram Map of Georgia shows the town of Chincapin Grove. The town was renamed Hoke in 1891 after a Seaboard Air Line Railroad executive, but that name was changed due to the Post Office Department's protest. By 1895, maps of Georgia no longer showed the town of Chinquapin Grove and instead show the town of Dacula.

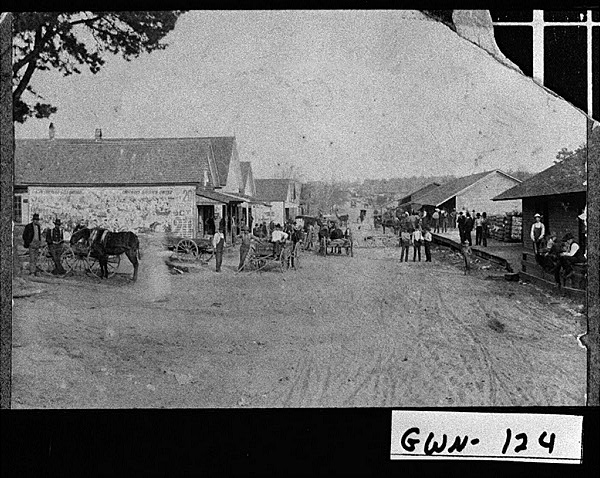
Dacula, 1905. Downtown Main Street. Seaboard Railroad occupied the buildings at right to ship cotton and other commodities

=== 1900s ===
Dacula's name is said to be formed from letters in Decatur and Atlanta by a postmaster. The two cities to the west that were already prospering at the time of Dacula's founding. The New-Herald issue dated June 16, 1899 stated that Dacula would soon decide whether or not it wished to be incorporated; however, the town was not incorporated until 1905, because residents feared that incorporation would destroy business and industry.

Religion was and continues to be a driving force in Dacula. One of the first churches built in the town was a Methodist church, founded by Rev. R. P. Jackson. A News-Herald issue dated January 25, 1912 describes the brick building was no larger than 40x60 ft.

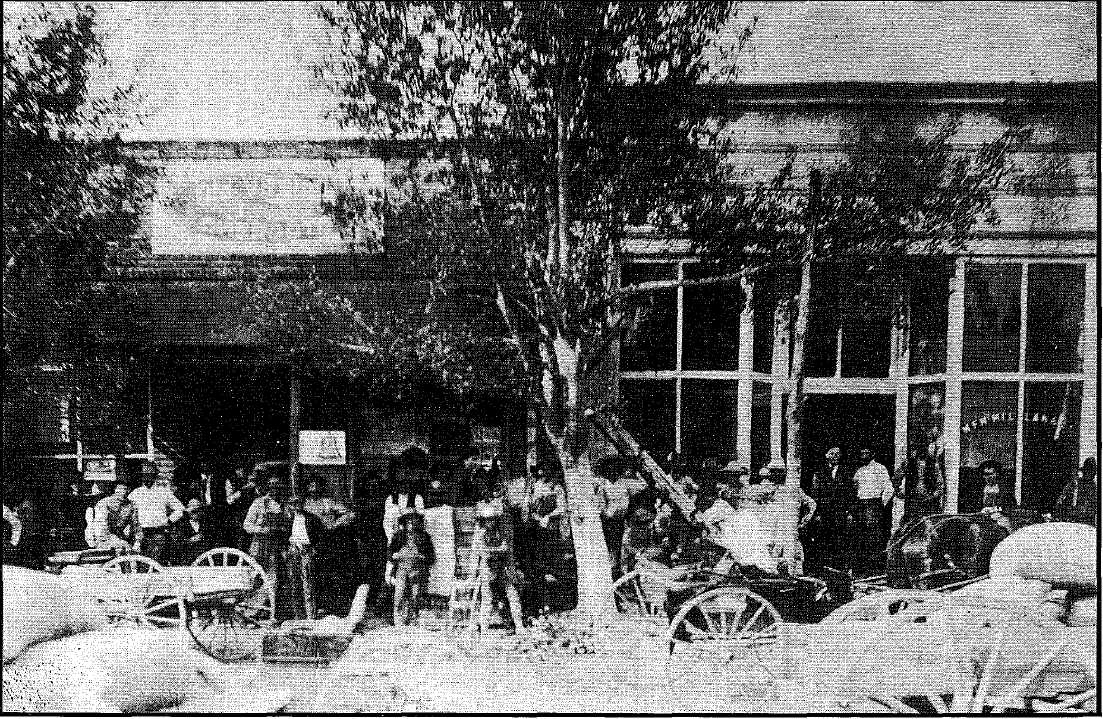
Historic Downtown Dacula circa 1900s

The town was once home to a train station on a CSX line through northeast Georgia, although the station closed in the mid-1950s.

=== 2000s ===
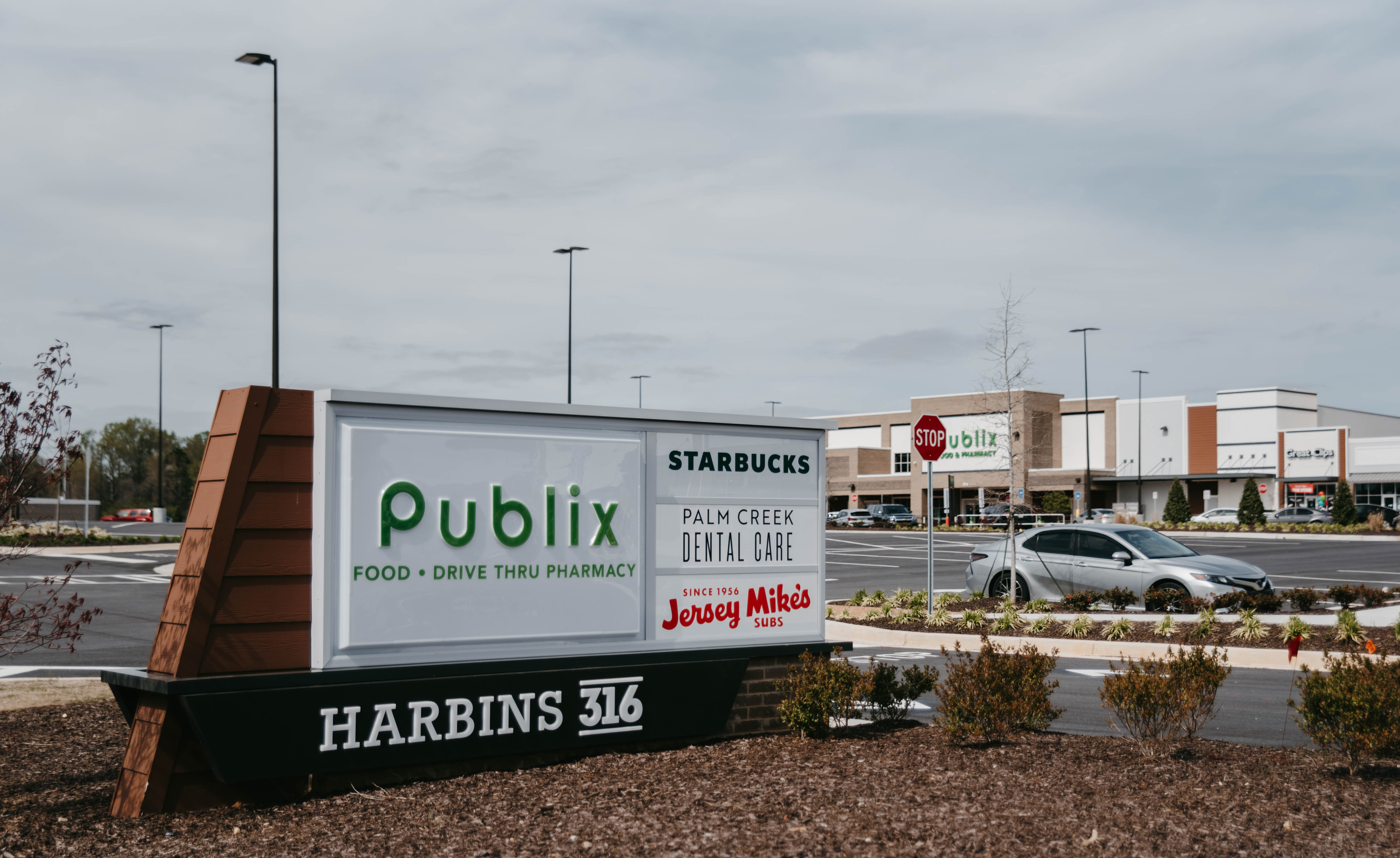
Harbins 316, Dacula, GA.

In 2022, Gwinnett County broke ground on the Rowen Project, which seeks to bring together researchers, entrepreneurs, and other innovators, alongside more than 50 research and educational institutions across Georgia to expand the state's research triangle. The Rowen Project borders the City, totaling more than 2,000 acres, extending all the way to the Barrow County line. Since the project's approval, the Dacula area has seen an increase in both suburban residential and strip mall commercial changes, including the Harbins 316 development, which massively expanded food and amenity access to a portion of Gwinnett County that previously had to drive 30–40 minutes to a grocery store. As the town becomes home to an increasing number of national chains, residents are increasingly proud of their local gathering places and traditions. The town unveiled a new playground and workout area in Maple Creek Park in 2024, and continues its renowned Memorial Day Parade.

In October 2025, the City hosted its first "Not Dracula Day" event, featuring a blood drive through the Red Cross Foundation. The City describes "Not Dracula Day" as an opportunity to celebrate the many names that the Dacula area has had over the years, while poking fun at the common mispronunciations. The first thing someone says when they first read Dacula is "hey it's like Dracula without the R." Rather than downplay the common mistake, the City has embraced it and created a new tradition for the community.

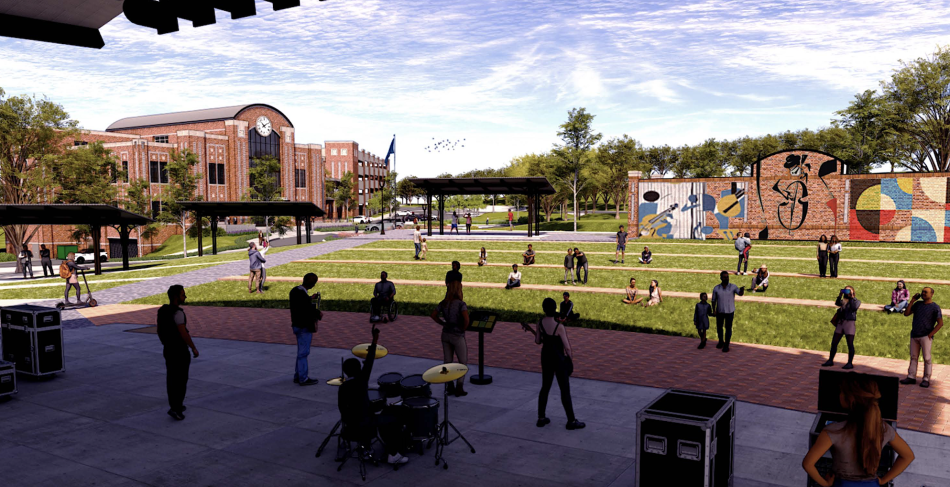
A rendering of the under construction Dacula City Core Project.

=== The Future of Dacula ===
In July of 2025, the City of Dacula broke ground on its "City Core Project." The project is designed to prioritize a "town center and gathering space" according to City employees. In the 2050 Comprehensive Plan outreach process, an over 60% of residents stated that festivals and events were a medium to high priority to them, along with a town center and public gather places being the most popular visioning workshop request. The public portion of the project will not be completed until 2027, and the private build out of the commercial/residential parcels have yet to be designed.

== Geography ==
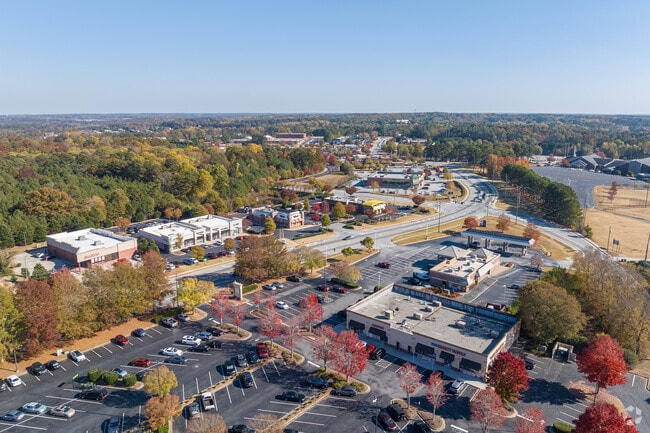
Aerial of Downtown Dacula, Georgia.

Dacula is located in eastern Gwinnett County, with U.S. Route 29 Business/Georgia State Route 8 (Winder Highway) the main road through the center of town. Business 29/SR 8 leads west 6 miles (10 km) to Lawrenceville, the county seat, and east 11 miles (18 km) to Winder. U.S. Route 29 (University Parkway) is a four-lane highway that bypasses Dacula to the south, with access from Harbins Road. University Parkway leads east 34 miles (55 km) to Athens and west 12 miles (19 km) to Interstate 85, which leads an additional 25 miles (40 km) southwest to Atlanta. The Little Mulberry Indian Mounds or the Parks-Strickland Archeological Complex are a series of carefully stacked rock piles located in Little Mulberry Park.

According to the United States Census Bureau, Dacula has a total area of 5.0 square miles (12.9 km^{2}), of which 0.031 square miles (0.08 km^{2}), or 0.59%, is water.

The Dacula 30019 ZIP code goes well beyond the city limits, resulting in mail delivery as far north as the unincorporated community of Hamilton Mill, south of Interstate 85.

== Demographics ==
Historical population
Census	Pop.	Note	%±
1900	120		—
1910	169		40.8%
1920	244		44.4%
1930	304		24.6%
1940	315		3.6%
1950	369		17.1%
1960	440		19.2%
1970	782		77.7%
1980	1,577		101.7%
1990	2,217		40.6%
2000	3,848		73.6%
2010	4,442		15.4%
2020	6,882		54.9%
2025 (est.)	9,373	▲	36.2%
U.S. Decennial Census; 2025

=== 2020 census ===
As of the 2020 census, Dacula had a population of 6,882. The median age was 35.0 years. 28.0% of residents were under the age of 18 and 10.3% of residents were 65 years of age or older. For every 100 females there were 94.6 males, and for every 100 females age 18 and over there were 89.9 males age 18 and over.

99.7% of residents lived in urban areas, while 0.3% lived in rural areas.

There were 2,125 households in Dacula, and there were 1,529 families residing in the city. Of those households, 49.0% had children under the age of 18 living in them. Of all households, 59.0% were married-couple households, 12.7% were households with a male householder and no spouse or partner present, and 22.7% were households with a female householder and no spouse or partner present. About 13.6% of all households were made up of individuals and 6.0% had someone living alone who was 65 years of age or older.

There were 2,187 housing units, of which 2.8% were vacant. The homeowner vacancy rate was 1.4% and the rental vacancy rate was 4.8%.

Dacula racial composition as of 2020
Race	Num.	Perc.
White (non-Hispanic)	2,942	42.75%
Black or African American (non-Hispanic)	1,922	27.93%
Native American	11	0.16%
Asian	296	4.3%
Pacific Islander	1	0.01%
Other/Mixed	323	4.69%
Hispanic or Latino	1,387	20.15%

== Government ==
=== Local government ===
Previous Mayors:

- Samuel L. Hinton
- L.C. Wilson
- Beverly Ambrose
- G.F. Pharr
- K.E. Taylor
- Claude Hinton
- Otho Pharr
- J.W. Hamilton
- Taylor Whitley
- W.B. Knight
- 1972 - 1980: Jimmy Wilbanks
- 1981 - 1985: Larry Fleeman
- 1986 - 1990: Travis D. Murray
- 1991 - 1993: Joe Houston
- 1994 - 1997: Michael Moon
- 1998 - 2001: Reed Miller
- 2002 - 2018: Jimmy Wilbanks
- 2018–Present: Trey King

The current mayor and council members are:

- Mayor: Trey King
- Council Members: Ann Mitchell, Denis Haynes, Jason Shelton, and Sean Williams.

== Education ==
The county operates Gwinnett County Public Schools. The following GCPS schools have Dacula mail addresses:

- Alcova Elementary School (Dacula cluster)
- Dacula Elementary School (Dacula cluster)
- Dyer Elementary School (Mountain View cluster)
- Fort Daniel Elementary School (Mill Creek cluster)
- Harbins Elementary School (Archer cluster)
- Puckett's Mill Elementary School (Mill Creek Cluster)
- Dacula Middle School (Dacula cluster)
- Dacula High School (Dacula cluster)

Gwinnett County Public Library operates the Dacula and Hamilton Mill Branch in the nearby unincorporated area of Hamilton Mill.

== Media ==
The town of Dacula is served by two newspapers: the Gwinnett Daily Post (based in nearby Lawrenceville) and the Hamilton Mill Neighborhood News.

== Parks ==
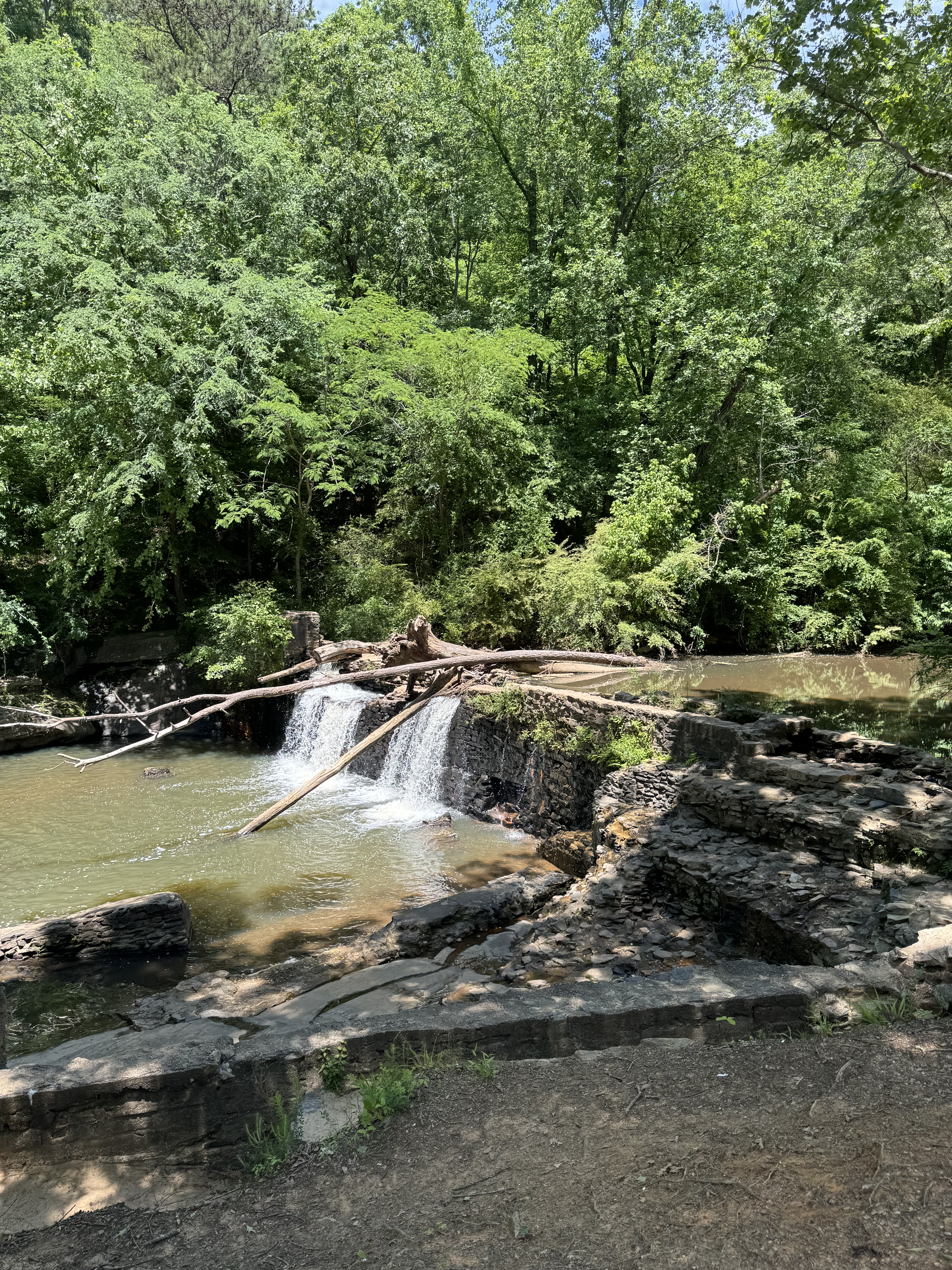
Freeman's Mill

The following parks are located in the town of Dacula:

- Dacula Park
- Duncan Creek Park
- Freeman's Mill Park
- Harbins Park
- Little Mulberry Park
- Maple Creek Park
- Olde Mill Park
- Rabbit Hill Park

== Notable people ==
- Andrew Booth Jr. - current cornerback for the Minnesota Vikings
- Vanessa Briscoe Hay - singer
- McClain Hermes - Paralympic swimmer
- David Irons - former cornerback for the Atlanta Falcons
- Kenny Irons - former running back for the Cincinnati Bengals
- Corey Levin - football player
- Levi Lowrey - singer-songwriter
- Brittany Rogers (softball) - softball player
- Donna Sheldon - Politician. Founder and former director of Dacula Classical Academy. Member of Georgia House of Representatives for District 71, 104 and 105.
- Roba Stanley - Country singer.
- Gid Tanner - Country singer.
- Jason Wisdom - heavy metal vocalist and guitarist
