= First Congregational Church (Atlanta) =

Historic church in Georgia, United States

- U.S. National Register of Historic Places
- Atlanta Landmark Building
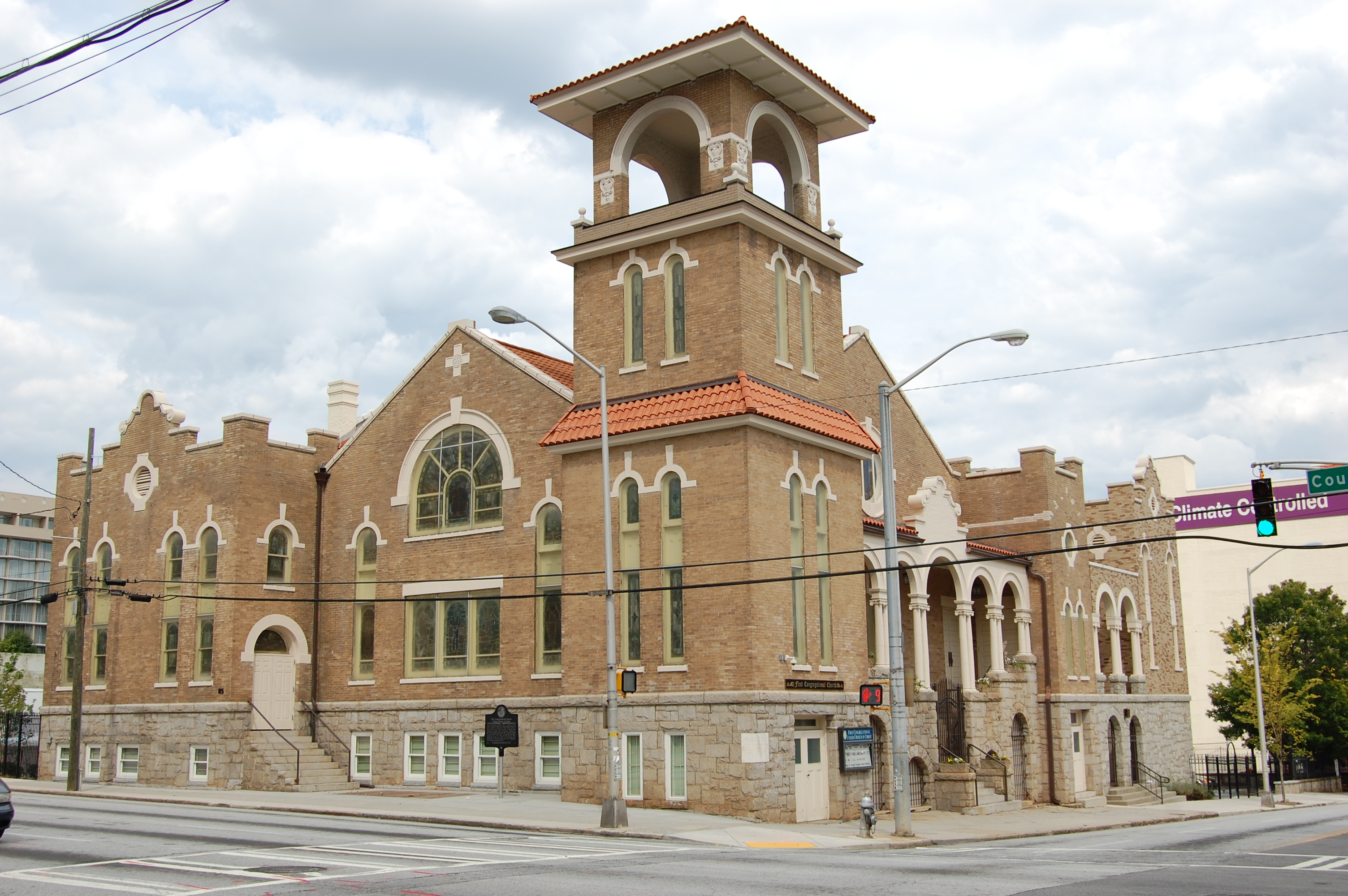
- First Congregational Church (2012)

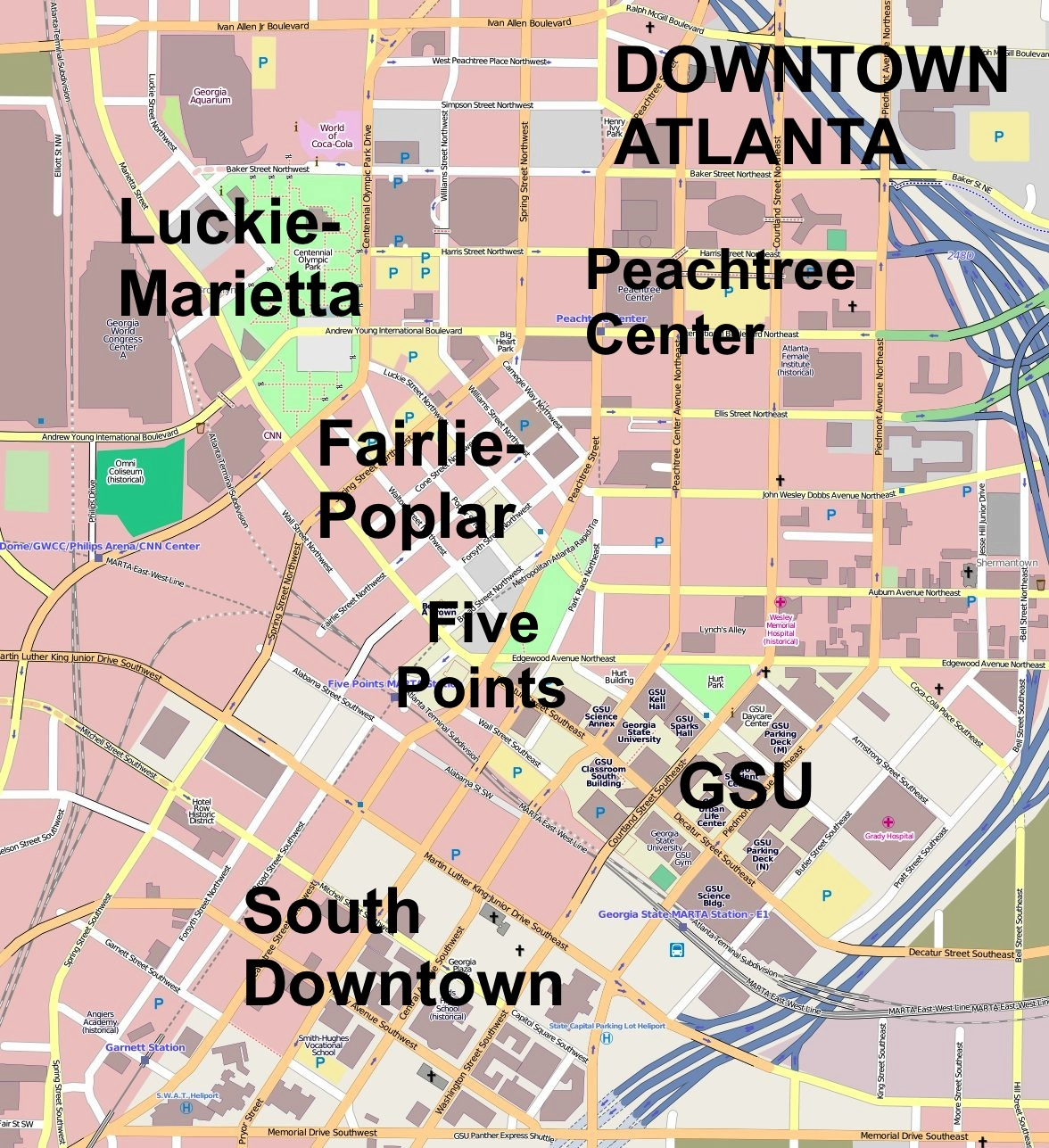
- Location within Downtown Atlanta Location within Atlanta Location within Georgia Location within the United States
- Location: 105 Courtland St., NE, Atlanta, Georgia
- Coordinates: 33°45′27″N 84°23′1″W
- Area: less than one acre
- Built: 1908
- Built by: Robert E. Pharrow
- Architect: Alexander Campbell Bruce, Arthur Greene Everett
- Architectural style: Renaissance
- NRHP reference No.: 79000720

Significant dates
- Added to NRHP: January 19, 1979
- Designated ALB: October 23, 1989

First Congregational Church (First Church, United Church of Christ) is a United Church of Christ church located in downtown Atlanta at the corner of Courtland Street and John Wesley Dobbs Avenue (formerly Houston Street).The church has had many prominent members over the years including Alonzo Herndon and Andrew Young. First Congregational Church welcomes people from all racial and economic backgrounds and has a prominent music ministry. The current senior minister, Dr. Reverend Dwight Andrews, is also a professor of music at Emory University.

The church is the second-oldest African-American Congregational church in the United States. The American Missionary Association (AMA) established the Storrs School in Atlanta. The school served as a center for social services, education, and worship for newly freed blacks. Worshipers at the school's services petitioned for a church of their own. As a result, in May 1867 a Congregational church was organized, and the AMA donated the land. The church's first service was held on May 26, 1867, and its first ten members included Reverend and Mrs. Frederick Ayer and Atlanta University's first president Edmund Asa Ware.

The church was never formally segregated but had become mostly black by 1892. The current building is the second church, built on the site of the original one in 1908.
