= Bona Allen Mansion =

- Bona Allen House
- U.S. National Register of Historic Places
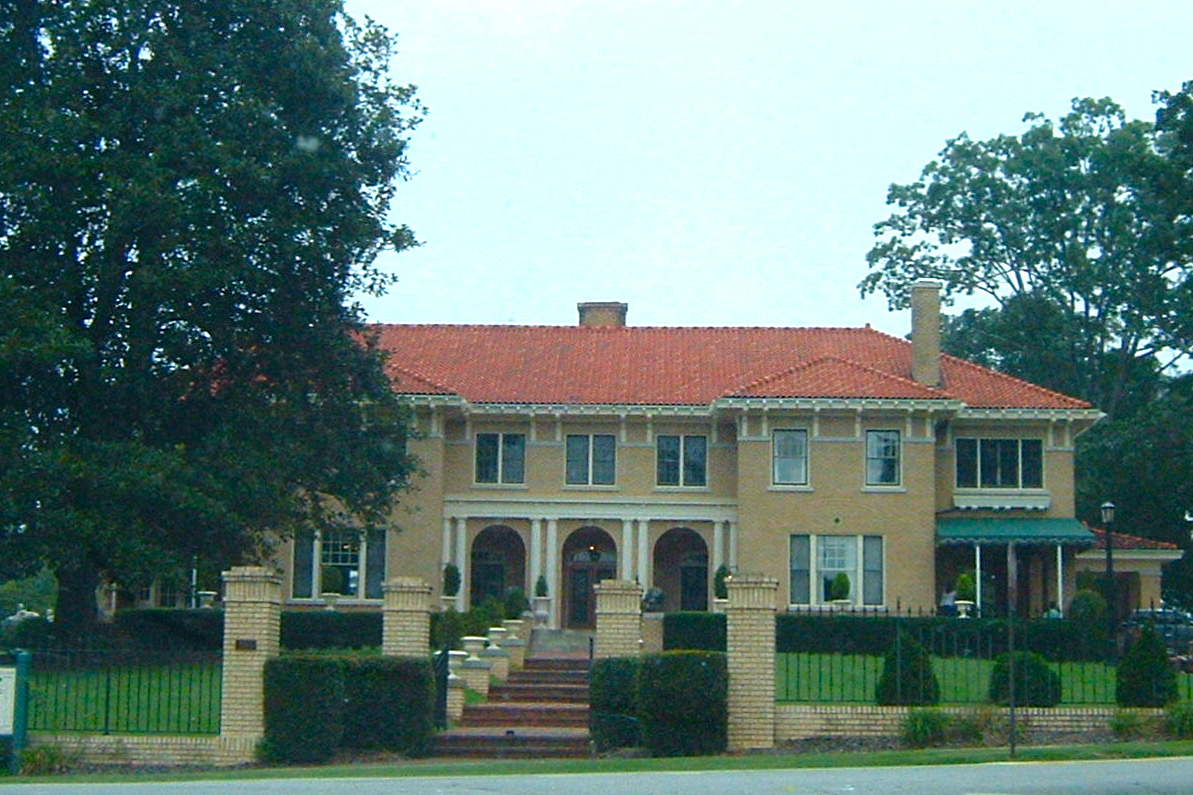

- Location within Georgia Location within the United States
- Location: 395 Main St., Buford, Georgia
- Coordinates: 34°07′25″N 84°00′01″W
- Area: 7.5 acres (3.0 ha)
- Built: 1911
- Built by: T.C. Wesley & Sons
- Architect: Haralson Bleckley
- Architectural style: Italian Villa
- NRHP reference No.: 83000231
- Added to NRHP: September 1, 1983

The Bona Allen Mansion, also known as Bona Allen House, at 395 Main St. in Buford, Georgia, in Gwinnett County. It was listed on the National Register of Historic Places in 1983. It was built in 1911. It was it home of Bona Allen, Sr.

The listing included eight contributing buildings, including a smokehouse.

Entrepreneur Steve Siebold and/or his companies bought the mansion in 2015.

== See also ==
- Bona Allen Company
