= Alexander Campbell Bruce =

American architect (1835–1927)

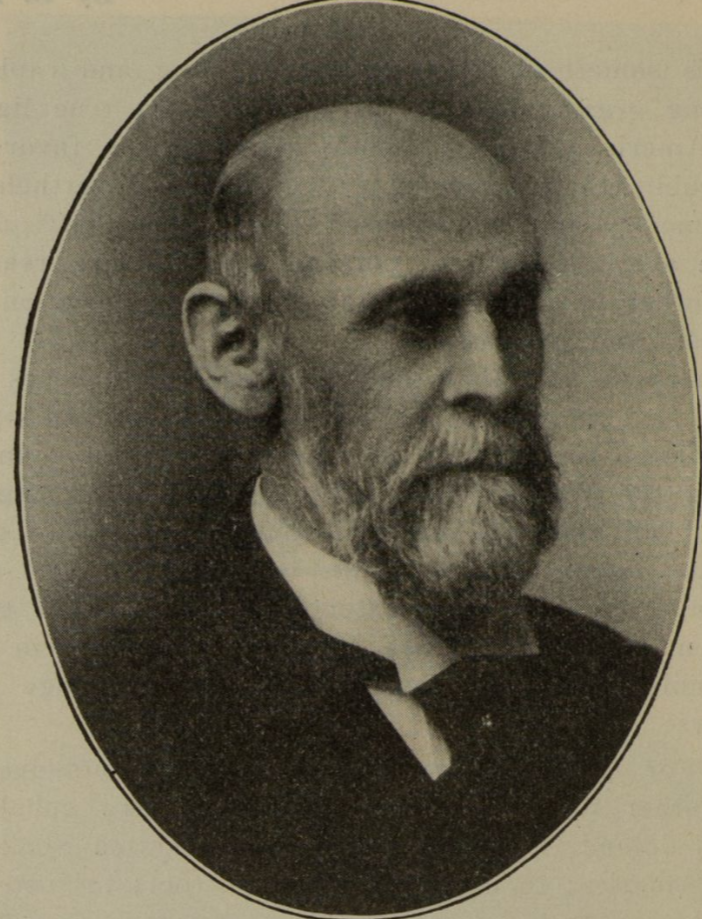
- Alexander Campbell Bruce, c. 1923
- Born: March 16, 1835; Fredericksburg, Virginia
- Died: December 10, 1927 (aged 92); Atlanta, Georgia
- Occupation: Architect
- Spouse: Jane H. Hagan (m. 1866)

Alexander Campbell Bruce (March 16, 1835 – December 10, 1927), also known as A. C. Bruce, was an American architect based in Atlanta, Georgia.

== Biography ==
Alexander Campbell Bruce was born in Fredericksburg, Virginia on March 16, 1835. His family moved to Nashville in 1847. He was trained in carpentry and the building trade by his father, and studied architecture.

He married Jane H. Hagan in Nashville in 1866.

He moved to Atlanta in 1879. He partnered for a time with A. F. N. Everett (1881–1937), Thomas Henry Morgan (1857–1940), and William H. Parkins (1836–1894).

Alexander Campbell Bruce died at his home in Atlanta on December 10, 1927.

== Notable works ==
His works (on his own or with others) include:

- First Congregational Church (1902), 105 Courtland St., NE Atlanta, GA (Alexander Campbell Bruce and A.F.N. Everett ), NRHP-listed
- St. Nicholas Hotel, 141 Flint Ave., 300-310 Washington St., Albany, GA (Bruce & Everett), NRHP-listed
- Kirkwood School (1906), 138 Kirkwood Rd. Atlanta, GA (Bruce, Everett and Hayes), also included in Kirkwood Historic District, NRHP-listed
- John Brown Gordon statue (pedestal), Georgia State Capitol, Atlanta, GA (Alexander C. Bruce and McNeel Marble Works)
- Hamblen County Courthouse, 511 W. 2nd North St. Morristown, TN (Bruce, A.C.), NRHP-listed
- Haralson County Courthouse, Courthouse Sq. Buchanan, GA (Bruce, Alexander C.), NRHP-listed
- North Avenue Presbyterian Church, 607 Peachtree Ave., NE Atlanta, GA (Bruce, Alexander Campbell), NRHP-listed
- Old State Prison Building, 3 mi. (4.8 km) W of Milledgeville on GA 22 Milledgeville, GA (Bruce, Alexander C.), NRHP-listed

Many more as part of the partnership of Bruce & Morgan, which did work in Georgia, too. Including (some but not all of the NRIS ones):

- Monroe County Courthouse, Courthouse Sq., Forsyth, GA (Bruce & Morgan), NRHP-listed
- One or more works in Monroe Commercial Historic District (perhaps just the courthouse?) Monroe, GA (Bruce & Morgan), NRHP-listed
- Newton County Courthouse, Courthouse Sq. Covington, GA (Bruce & Morgan), NRHP-listed
- Oakland Cemetery, 248 Oakland Ave., SE Atlanta, GA (Bruce & Morgan), NRHP-listed
- Paulding County Courthouse, Courthouse Sq. Dallas, GA (Bruce & Morgan), NRHP-listed
- Talbot County Courthouse, Courthouse Sq. Talbotton, GA (Bruce & Morgan), NRHP-listed
- Walton County Courthouse, Courthouse Sq. Monroe, GA (Bruce & Morgan), NRHP-listed
- One or more works in Winthrop College Historic District, Along Oakland Ave. between Cherry Rd. and Stewart Ave. on the Winthrop College campus Rock Hill, SC (Bruce & Morgan), NRHP-listed
