= Paulding County Courthouse =

Paulding County Courthouse may refer to:

- Paulding County Courthouse (Georgia), Dallas, Georgia
- Paulding County Courthouse (Ohio), Paulding, Ohio
