= Talbot County Courthouse =

Talbot County Courthouse may refer to:

- Talbot County Courthouse (Georgia), Talbotton, Georgia
- Talbot County Courthouse (Maryland), Easton, Maryland
