= Thomas Henry Morgan =

American architect (1857–1940)

- Born: 1857; Knoxville, Tennessee, U.S.
- Died: December 22, 1940; Atlanta, Georgia, U.S.
- Education: University of Tennessee
- Occupation: Architect
- Spouse: Sarah Hyde
- Children: 1 daughter

Thomas Henry Morgan (1857 – December 22, 1940) was an architect in the U.S. state of Georgia.

For part of his career he worked in partnership with Alexander Campbell Bruce as Bruce & Morgan.

A number of his works, individually or in partnership, are listed on the U.S. National Register of Historic Places.

Works individually credited to him (with attribution variations) include:

- Burns Cottage, 988 Alloway Pl., SE Atlanta, GA (Morgan, Thomas H.), NRHP-listed
- Carnegie Library, jct. of Bellevue, Academy, and Jackson Sts. Dublin, GA (Morgan, Thomas H.), NRHP-listed
- W. D. Grant Building, built 1898, Chicago style, 44 Broad St., NW Atlanta, GA (Morgan, Thomas Henry), NRHP-listed
- Haralson County Courthouse, Courthouse Sq. Buchanan, GA (Morgan, Thomas H.), NRHP-listed
- North Avenue Presbyterian Church, 607 Peachtree Ave., NE Atlanta, GA (Morgan, Thomas Henry), NRHP-listed
