= National Register of Historic Places listings in Paulding County, Georgia =

This is a list of properties and districts in Paulding County, Georgia that are listed on the National Register of Historic Places (NRHP).

This National Park Service list is complete through NPS recent listings posted March 21, 2025.

== Current listings ==
	Name on the Register	Image	Date listed	Location	City or town	Description
1	Fannin-Cooper Farm	Fannin-Cooper Farm	July 17, 2012 (#12000411)	620 & 511 Smith Rd. 33°54′50″N 84°44′07″W	Hiram	
2	Hiram Colored School	Hiram Colored School	May 10, 2001 (#01000494)	W of GA 92 bet. jct. of Fitzgerald and Ragsdale Sts. 33°52′53″N 84°45′36″W	Hiram	
3	Paulding County Courthouse	Paulding County Courthouse	September 18, 1980 (#80001218)	Courthouse Sq. 33°55′27″N 84°50′29″W	Dallas	
4	Pickett's Mill Battlefield Site	Pickett's Mill Battlefield Site	April 26, 1973 (#73000637)	NE of Dallas off GA 92; 33°58′51″N 84°45′20″W	Dallas	Now a Georgia state historic site
