= Bulloch County Courthouse =

Historic courthouse in Georgia, US

- U.S. National Register of Historic Places
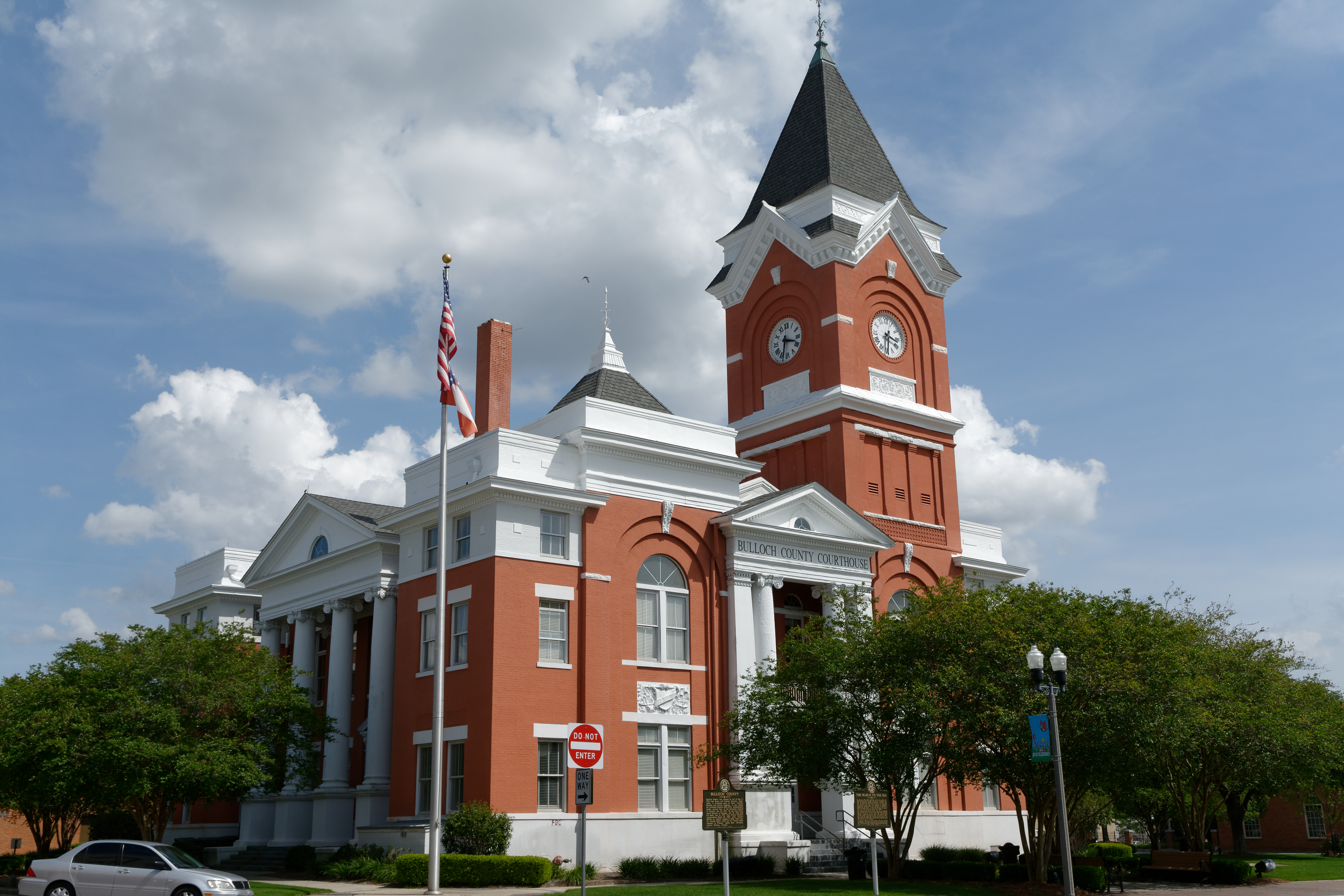
- Bulloch County Courthouse in 2017

- Location within Georgia Location within the United States
- Interactive map showing the location of Bulloch County Courthouse
- Location: Courthouse Sq., Statesboro, Georgia
- Coordinates: 32°26′57″N 81°46′59″W
- Area: 1 acre (0.40 ha)
- Built: 1894
- Architect: Bruce & Morgan. 1894; Edward Columbus Hosford of Hosford & Co., 1914
- Architectural style: Classical Revival, Queen Anne
- MPS: Georgia County Courthouses TR
- NRHP reference No.: 80000978
- Added to NRHP: September 18, 1980

The Bulloch County Courthouse is a historic courthouse that is located in downtown Statesboro, Georgia, United States. It was built in 1894 to house the county government. On September 18, 1980, the building was added to the National Register of Historic Places.

== History ==
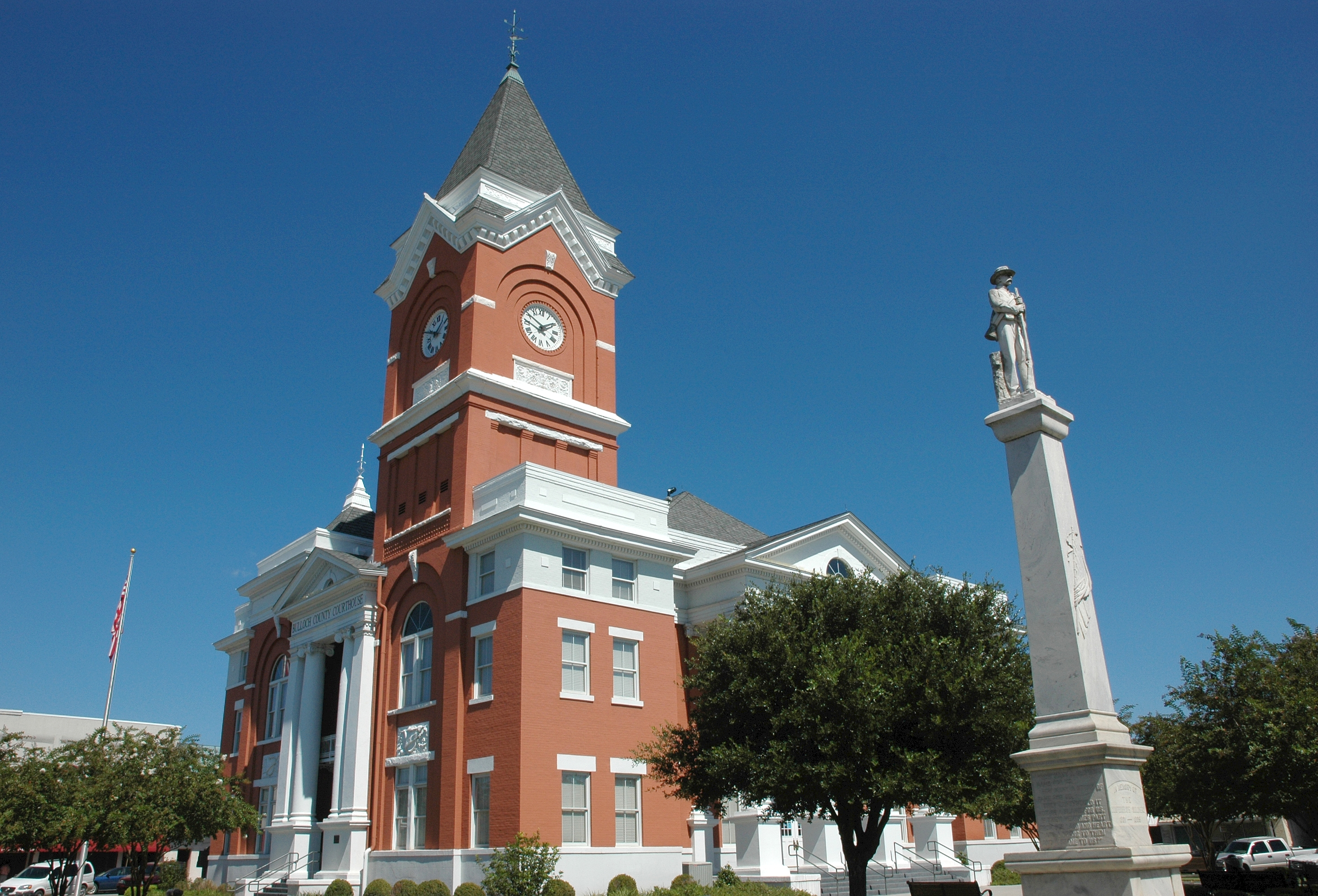
Confederate Monument at courthouse

=== 18th century ===
Bulloch County was officially established on February 8, 1796. Bryan and Screven counties were the two counties that Bulloch County was created from by an act of the Georgia General Assembly. Bulloch County was named after Archibald Bulloch, who was Georgia's first provisional governor from 1776 to 1777. In 1796 three men were appointed to be commissioners: Drury Jones, John Mikell and Israel Bird. They were in charge of finding a proper place to build the courthouse and the jail. In May 1797 the first Superior Court was held in Bulloch County at Stephen Mills’ home and continued to be held there until the courthouse was built. The fourth Mondays in April and October were the only two days that the superior court met each year. The inferior court, however, met every first Monday of the month. When Bulloch County first started having court, there were no local lawyers or judges. Bulloch County obtained its first lawyers and judges after the Civil War.

The justices of the inferior court that were appointed by the legislature in 1796 were Israel Bird, John Rawls, and James Bird. The justices of the peace included John Douglas, John Everett, Robert Scott, William McCall, and Mark Pridgeon.

=== 19th century ===
Benjamin Richardson, Drury Jones, Joseph Rogers, and John Everett, and Stephen Denmark are the justices of the inferior court that were appointed through 1800. Jarvis Jackson, Hardeman Richardson, and John O’Neil were the ones that succeed them in 1802. The justices would now be compensated for their services in 1802 because of an act that was passed. Bridger Jones was appointed in 1808 as justice. S. Williams and Jonathon Roberts were appointed as justices in 1810.

In 1803, in exchange for receiving 200 acres (0.81 km^{2}) of land to build the courthouse, jail, and other public buildings, the Georgia General Assembly was to name the new county seat "Statesborough". Bulloch County did not have a courthouse until 1806. All of the court proceedings before 1806 were held in private homes or under the Old Walnut Tree. Statesboro did not grown any in the fifty years that it had been developed. It was just considered the place where court took place. On December 5, 1864 the 15th Corps of General William Sherman's army burned the courthouse. "Statesborough" was officially incorporated by the legislature on December 20, 1866. The name changed from "Statesborough" to "Statesboro."

The second courthouse was built shortly after the first courthouse was burned. It was a two-story wood frame structure on Courthouse Square.

The Bulloch Grand Jury decided in spring of 1894 to build a new courthouse. The two-story building was sold after the Grand Jury decided to build a new courthouse. By December 1894 the new courthouse was built. The total cost of the courthouse was twenty thousand dollars, which included furnishings.

In 1897, the Bulloch County community came together to buy and get a clock installed at the courthouse. It is also thought that the courthouse at one time had an open-flame system at the top of the building that was used in the hopes of raising the warm air out of the building up to the roof. The open flame system is thought to have been used for some years before being dismantled with no record as to its success in helping to cool the building.

=== 20th century ===
In 1904, the lynching of Paul Reed and Will Cato occurred after the two African American men were removed from the courthouse. The sheriff had released the prisoners to the mob.

On April 26, 1909 the Confederate monument was dedicated. The Confederate monument is in memory of the Confederate soldiers who served from 1861 to 1865. The United Daughters of the Confederacy raised the money for the monument that presides on Court House Square.

The Bulloch County Courthouse and its square appear in the film 1969. In several scenes, the "B" in Bulloch County is changed on the courthouse to a "C" for the film's "Culloch County." The former bank building now housing the Averitt Center for the Arts appeared in "1969" as a bus station. The courthouse square is also prominent in the film's ending scene.

== Architecture ==
The courthouse was designed by Bruce and Morgan in 1894. It was renovated in 1914 in the Classical Revival and Queen Anne styles by Edward Columbus Hosford, who is noted for the courthouses and other buildings that he designed in Florida, Georgia and Texas. Columned porticoes and the large corner brick masses were added in 1914. Throughout the years, the courthouse went through many renovations that utilized different colors of brick, which might be why the exterior of the courthouse was coated with white plaster. By the 1990s, the county commission decided to restore the courthouse to its original condition. The restoration began in 1998. Some of the white plaster was professionally removed because the plaster contained asbestos, which posed a health risk. The rest of the white plaster that was not removed was just painted a red brick color. The restoration was completed in 2000. Martin, Rule and Associates, of Statesboro were the architects for this renovation in 1998 to 2000.

== Today ==
The courthouse is still in use. In the 1990s, the courthouse no longer had enough space for all of the functions that it normally provided; therefore, it expanded into the adjacent buildings around the courthouse. Also in the 1990s, Bulloch County built a judicial annex, which is located across the street from the courthouse. The county officers are now located in the former Statesboro First Federal Savings and Loan Association Building, and the courts and judges’ offices are located in the new annex.

== See also ==
- National Register of Historic Places listings in Bulloch County, Georgia
