= Butts County Courthouse =

- U.S. National Register of Historic Places
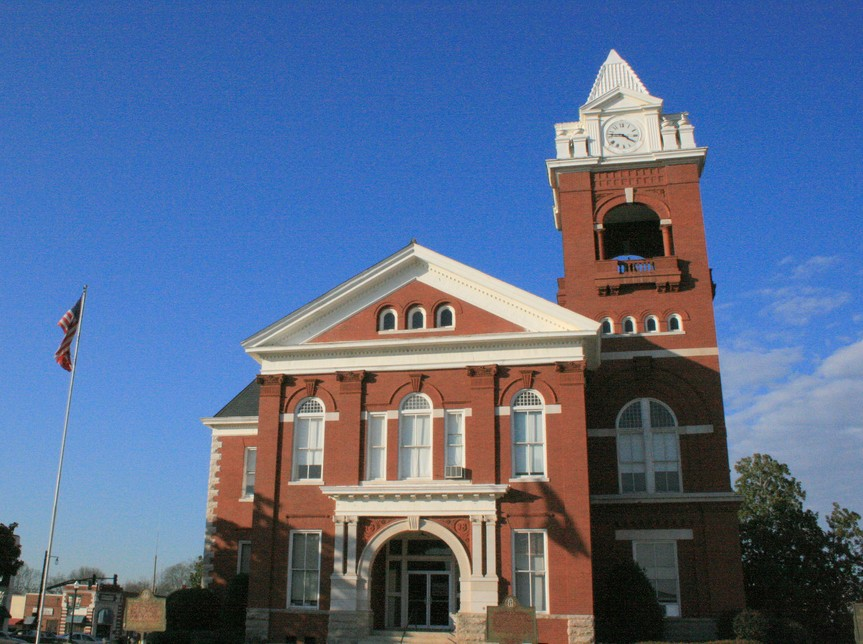

- Location within Georgia Location within the United States
- Interactive map showing the location of Butts County Courthouse
- Location: Jackson, Georgia
- Coordinates: 33°17′41″N 83°58′1″W
- Area: 1 acre (0.40 ha)
- Built: 1898
- Built by: J.H. McKenzie & Son
- Architect: Bruce & Morgan; J.H. McKenzie & Son
- Architectural style: High Victorian
- MPS: Georgia County Courthouses TR
- NRHP reference No.: 80000982
- Added to NRHP: September 18, 1980

The Butts County Courthouse is an historic former government building designed by Bruce & Morgan and constructed in 1898 by J.H. McKenzie & Son in Jackson, Butts County, Georgia, United States.

The courthouse is located on West Third Street (US 23/GA 42/GA 16) and North Mulberry Street, across from the west end of the overlap with GA 36 (South Mulberry Street). It is also located on West Second Street and North Oak Street. In simple terms, the town square.

It was added to the National Register of Historic Places on September 18, 1980. In 2019, courthouse functions ceased in the building, and renovations began in order to re-open as the Economic Development and Tourism Center.

Its design seems to be a less elaborate version of the Monroe County Courthouse designed by Bruce & Morgan in 1896. It is High Victorian in style. The courthouse hosts a confederate monument.

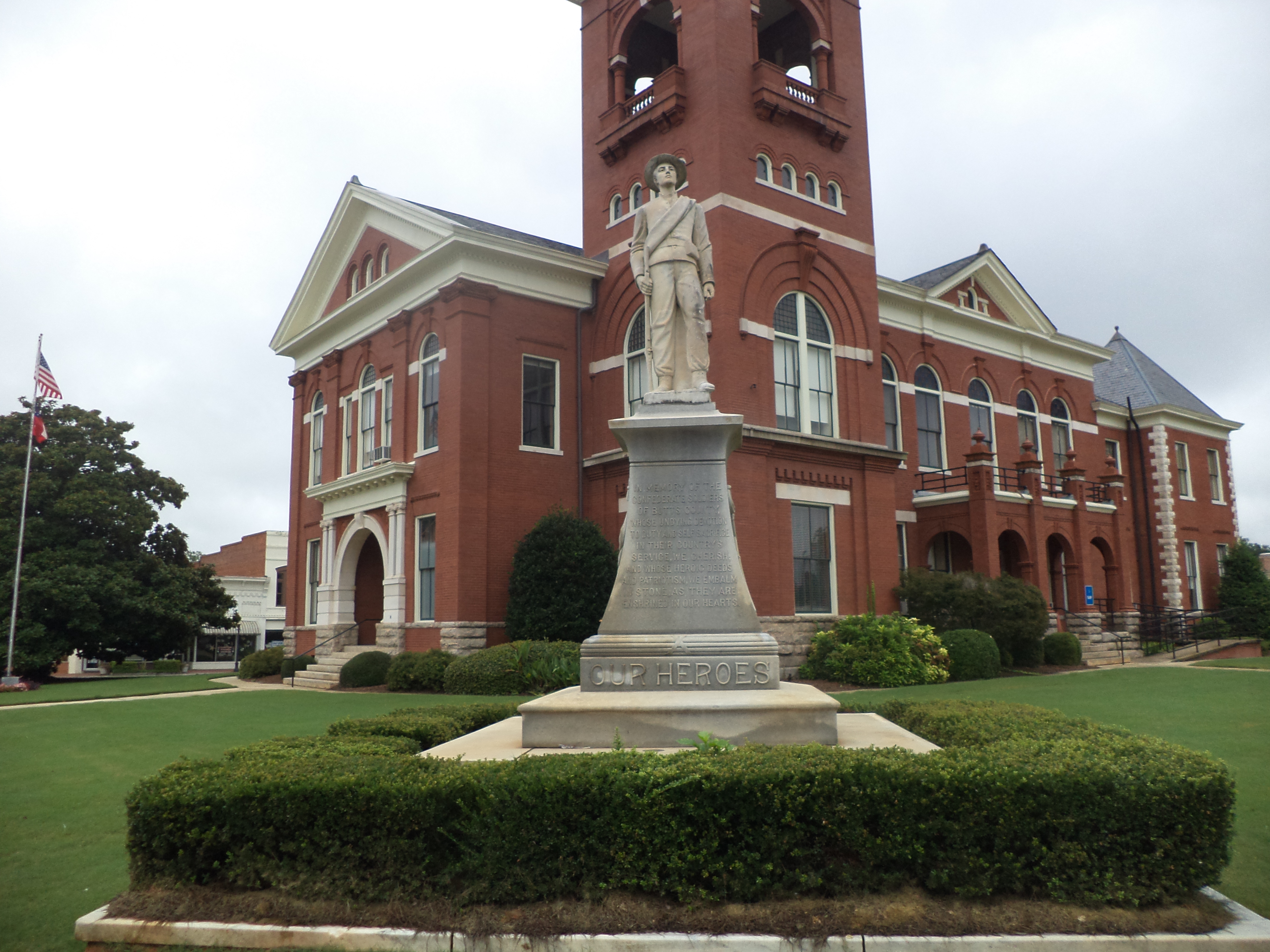
Confederate Monument at Butts County Courthouse

== See also ==
- National Register of Historic Places listings in Butts County, Georgia
