= Bruce & Morgan =

Former architectural firm based in Atlanta, US

Practice information
- Founders: Alexander Campbell Bruce; Thomas Henry Morgan
- Founded: 1882
- Dissolved: 1903
- Location: Atlanta

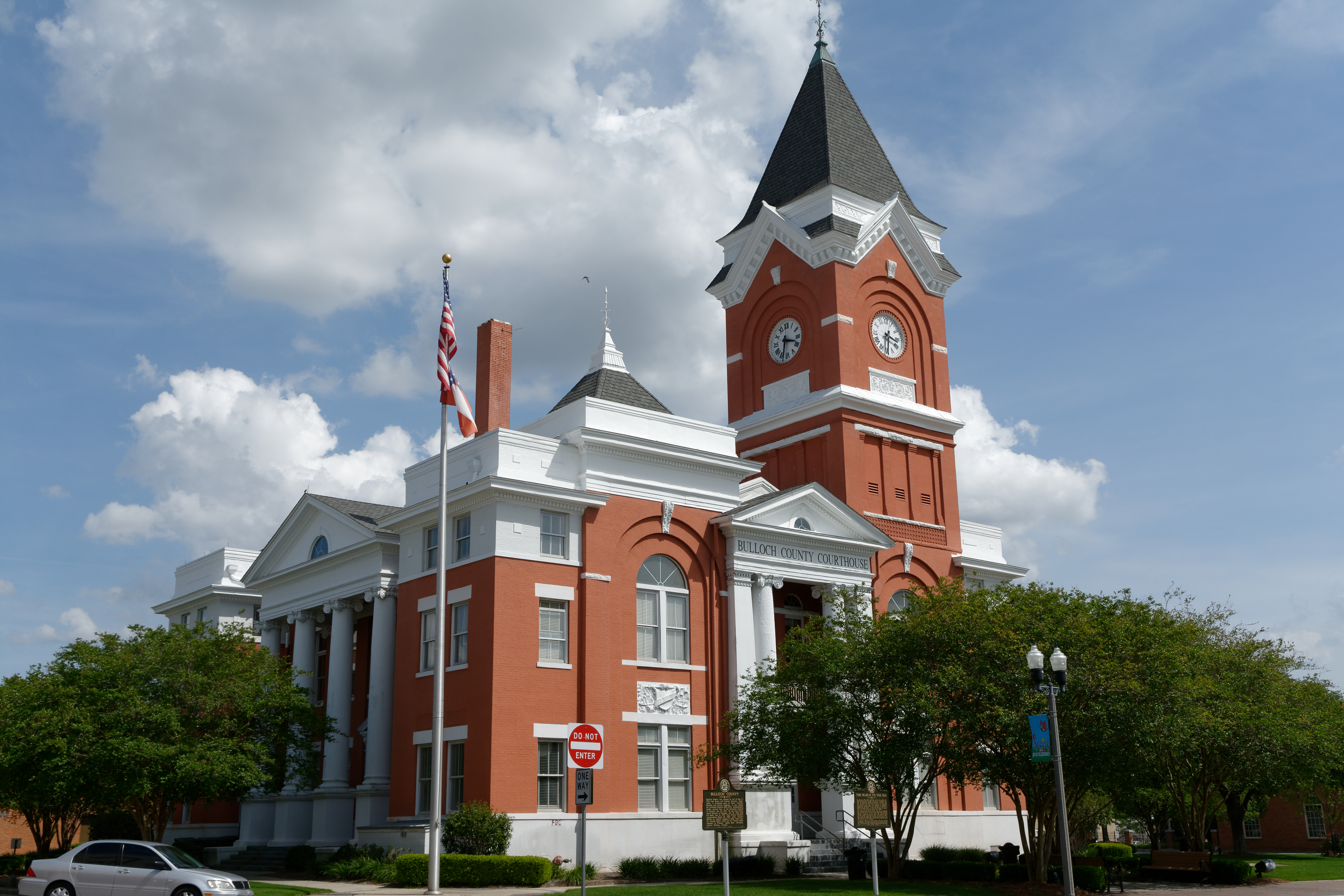
Bulloch County Courthouse, built in 1894

Bruce & Morgan was an American architectural firm based in Atlanta. It was established in 1882 as the partnership of architects Alexander Campbell Bruce (1835-1927) and Thomas Henry Morgan (1857-1940).

== History ==
Bruce & Morgan were the successors to Parkins & Bruce. Senior partner William H. Parkins was the first architect to practice in postbellum Atlanta, having moved there in 1868. Although the firm designed a range of buildings types and sizes, the firm largely focused on designing public buildings (courthouses, schools, religious buildings, etc.). The firm's major projects often contain Romanesque elements such as bell towers and attempts at classical architectural symmetry. In the twentieth century, the firm's projects shifted towards steel framed skyscrapers in Atlanta. In 1903 the partnership was expanded to include John Robert Dillon, formerly of Chicago, and became known as Bruce, Morgan & Dillon. Bruce withdrew from the partnership in 1904, after which it became known as Morgan & Dillon and later Morgan, Dillon & Lewis. Under Morgan's leadership the firm lasted until his death in 1940.

== Legacy ==
The firm produced many works which are preserved and listed on the United States National Register of Historic Places.

== Architectural works ==
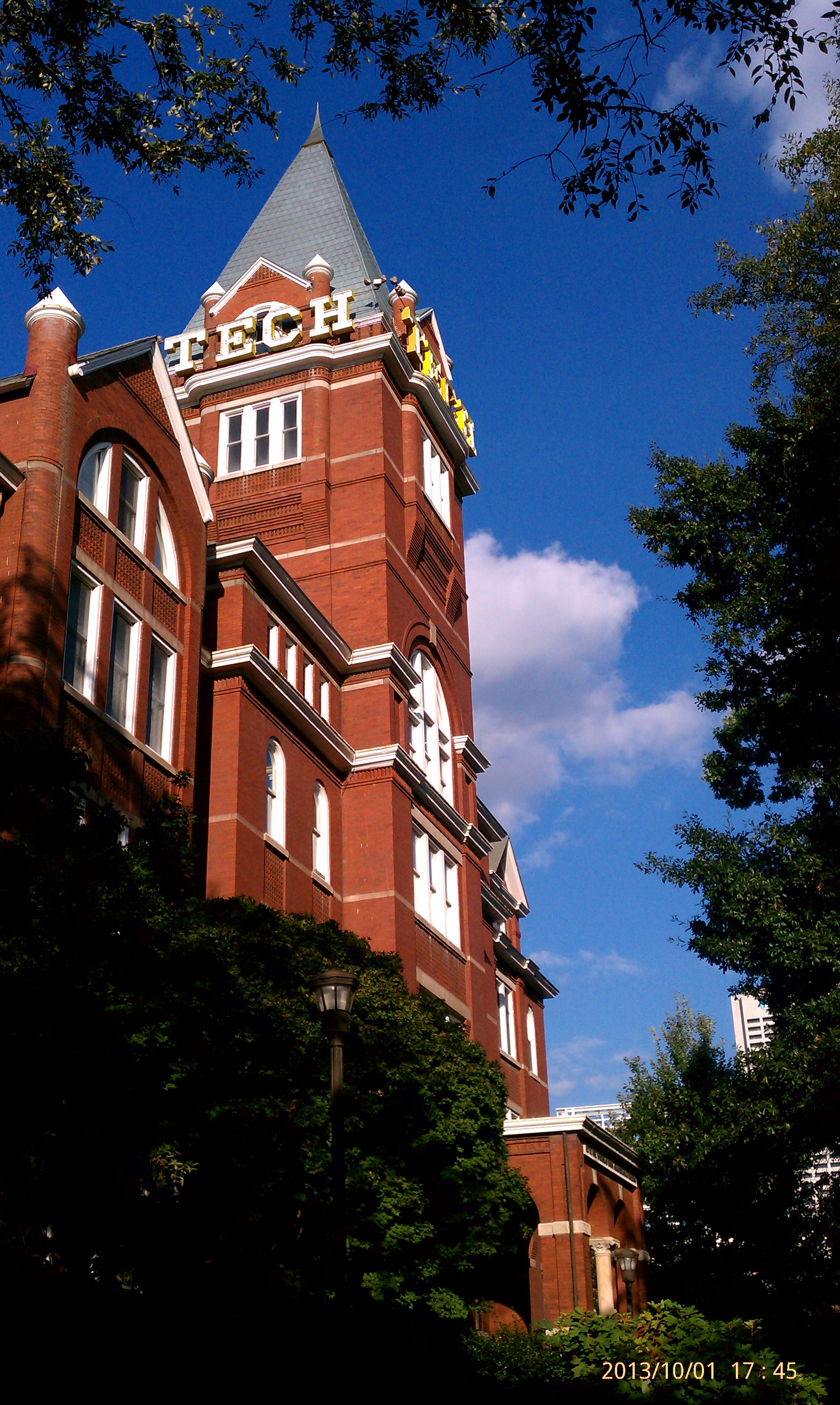
Tech Tower, built in 1888

Its works (credits) include:

- Atkinson Hall, Georgia College, Georgia College campus, Milledgeville, GA (Bruce & Morgan) NRHP-listed
- Samuel H. Brodnax House, GA 81, Walnut Grove, GA Bruce & Morgan) NRHP-listed
- Brooks County Courthouse, Courthouse Sq., Quitman, GA (Bruce & Morgan) NRHP-listed
- Bulloch County Courthouse, 1894, Courthouse Sq., Statesboro, GA (Bruce & Morgan) NRHP-listed
- Butts County Courthouse, Courthouse Sq., Jackson, GA (Bruce & Morgan) NRHP-listed
- J. R. Carmichael House, 149 McConough Rd., Jackson, GA (Bruce & Morgan) NRHP-listed
- Central of Georgia Railroad Terminal (1200 6th Ave., Columbus, Georgia) (1901), 1200 6th Ave., Columbus, GA (Bruce & Morgan) NRHP-listed
- Fayette County Courthouse, GA 85, Fayetteville, GA (Bruce & Morgan) NRHP-listed
- Fire Station No. 6, 39 Boulevard NE, Atlanta, GA (Bruce & Morgan) Martin Luther King, Jr. NHL District contributing structure.
- Floyd County Courthouse, 5th Ave., and Tribune St., Rome, GA (Bruce & Morgan) NRHP-listed
- Georgia Institute of Technology Administration Building (Tech Tower), 225 North Avenue NW, Atlanta, GA (Bruce & Morgan) NRHP-listed
- Haralson County Courthouse, Courthouse Sq., Buchanan, GA (Bruce & Morgan) NRHP-listed
- Monroe County Courthouse, Courthouse Sq., Forsyth, GA (Bruce & Morgan) NRHP-listed
- Newton County Courthouse, Courthouse Sq., Covington, GA (Bruce & Morgan) NRHP-listed
- Oakland Cemetery, 248 Oakland Ave., SE, Atlanta, GA (Bruce & Morgan) NRHP-listed
- Paulding County Courthouse, Courthouse Sq., Dallas, GA (Bruce & Morgan) NRHP-listed
- Samford Hall, Auburn University, Auburn, Alabama
- M. Rich and Brothers and Company Building at 82 Peachtree St. SE, Atlanta, GA (location of Rich's (department store); 1906 renovation and expansion of the original 1882 building)
- Talbot County Courthouse, Courthouse Sq., Talbotton, GA (Bruce & Morgan) NRHP-listed
- Walton County Courthouse, Courthouse Sq., Monroe, GA (Bruce & Morgan) NRHP-listed
- Wigwam Hotel
- One or more works in Clemson University Historic District I; Tillman Hall at Clemson University, northern portion of campus along US 76, Clemson, SC (Bruce & Morgan) NRHP-listed.
- One or more works in Covington Historic District, Roughly Covington City S of US 278, Covington, GA (Bruce and Morgan) NRHP-listed
- One or more works in Hotel Row Historic District, 205—235 Mitchell St., Atlanta, GA (Bruce & Morgan) NRHP-listed
- One or more works in Monroe Commercial Historic District, Spring and Broad Sts., Monroe, GA (Bruce & Morgan) NRHP-listed
- One or more works in Winthrop College Historic District, along Oakland Ave. between Cherry Rd. and Stewart Ave. on the Winthrop College campus, Rock Hill, South Carolina (Bruce & Morgan) NRHP-listed

== See also ==
- St. Nicholas Hotel, 141 Flint Ave., 300—310 Washington St., Albany, GA (Bruce & Everett) NRHP-listed
