= Pickett's Mill Battlefield Site =

State park and historic site in the U.S. state of Georgia

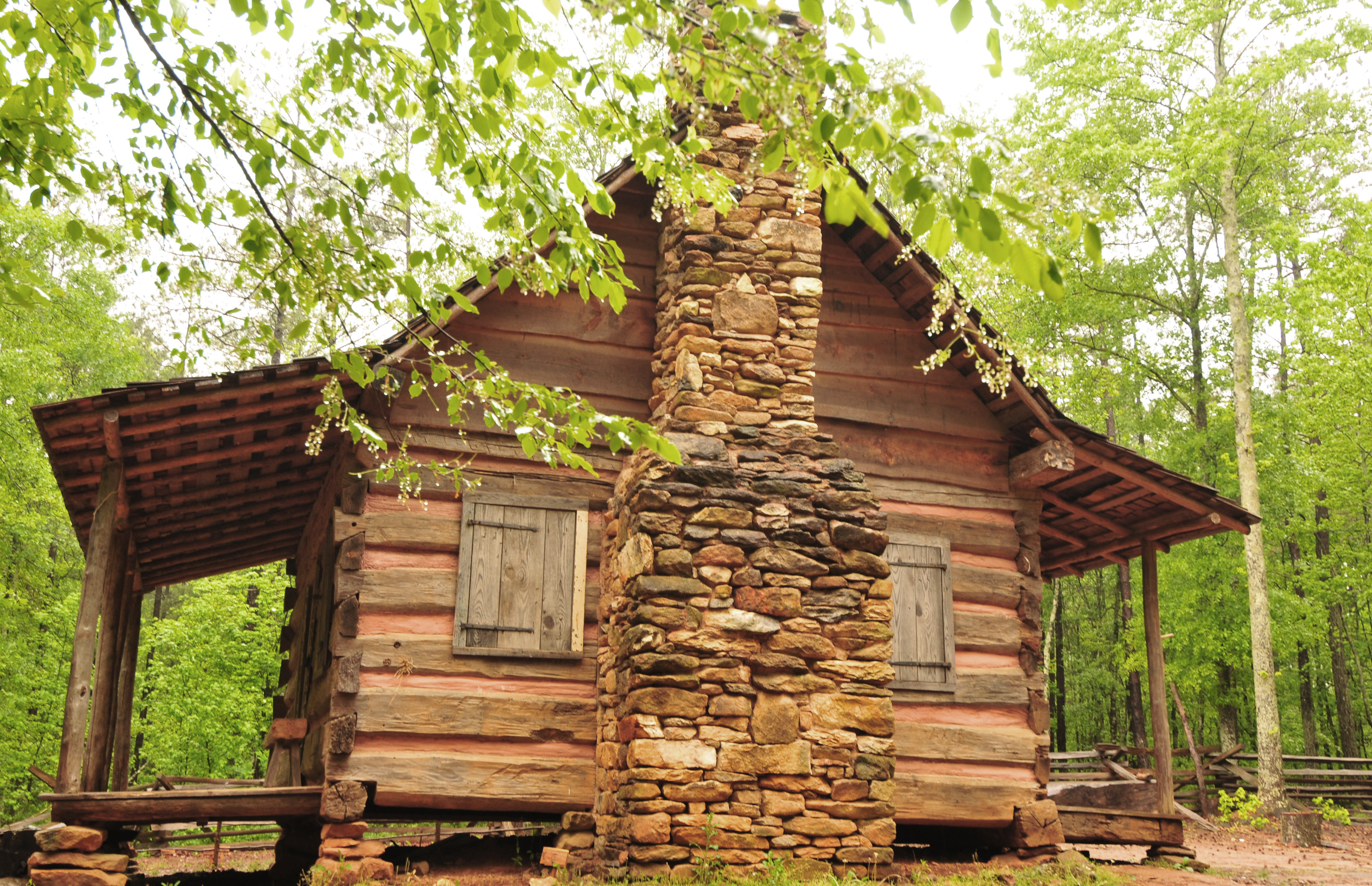
- Pioneer Log Cabin

- Location within Georgia Location within the United States
- Location: Paulding County, Georgia
- Nearest city: Dallas, Georgia
- Coordinates: 33°58′26.4″N 84°45′32.76″W
- Governing body: Georgia Department of Natural Resources
- Pickett's Mill Battlefield Site
- U.S. National Register of Historic Places
- NRHP reference No.: 73000637

Pickett's Mill Battlefield Site is a Georgia state park in Paulding County, Georgia, that preserves the American Civil War battlefield of the Battle of Pickett's Mill. The 765-acre site includes roads used by Union and Confederate troops, earthwork battlements, and an 1800s-era pioneer cabin. The area's ravine is a site where hundreds died. The park's visitor center includes exhibits and a film about the battle.

The battle took place on May 27, 1864, as the Union Army tried to advance on Atlanta two days after the Battle of New Hope Church. The battle included 14,000 Union Army troops under General Howard and 10,000 Confederate troops under General Cleburne. The Union army began its attack at around 5 p.m. The Confederate army held out. The Union army had 1,600 casualties and the Confederate Army lost approximately 500.

The site was added to the National Register of Historic Places on April 26, 1973. It is located northeast of Dallas, Georgia off GA 92 at 4432 Mt. Tabor Church Rd.

== See also ==
- National Register of Historic Places listings in Paulding County, Georgia
