= Burns Cottage (Atlanta) =

- U.S. National Register of Historic Places
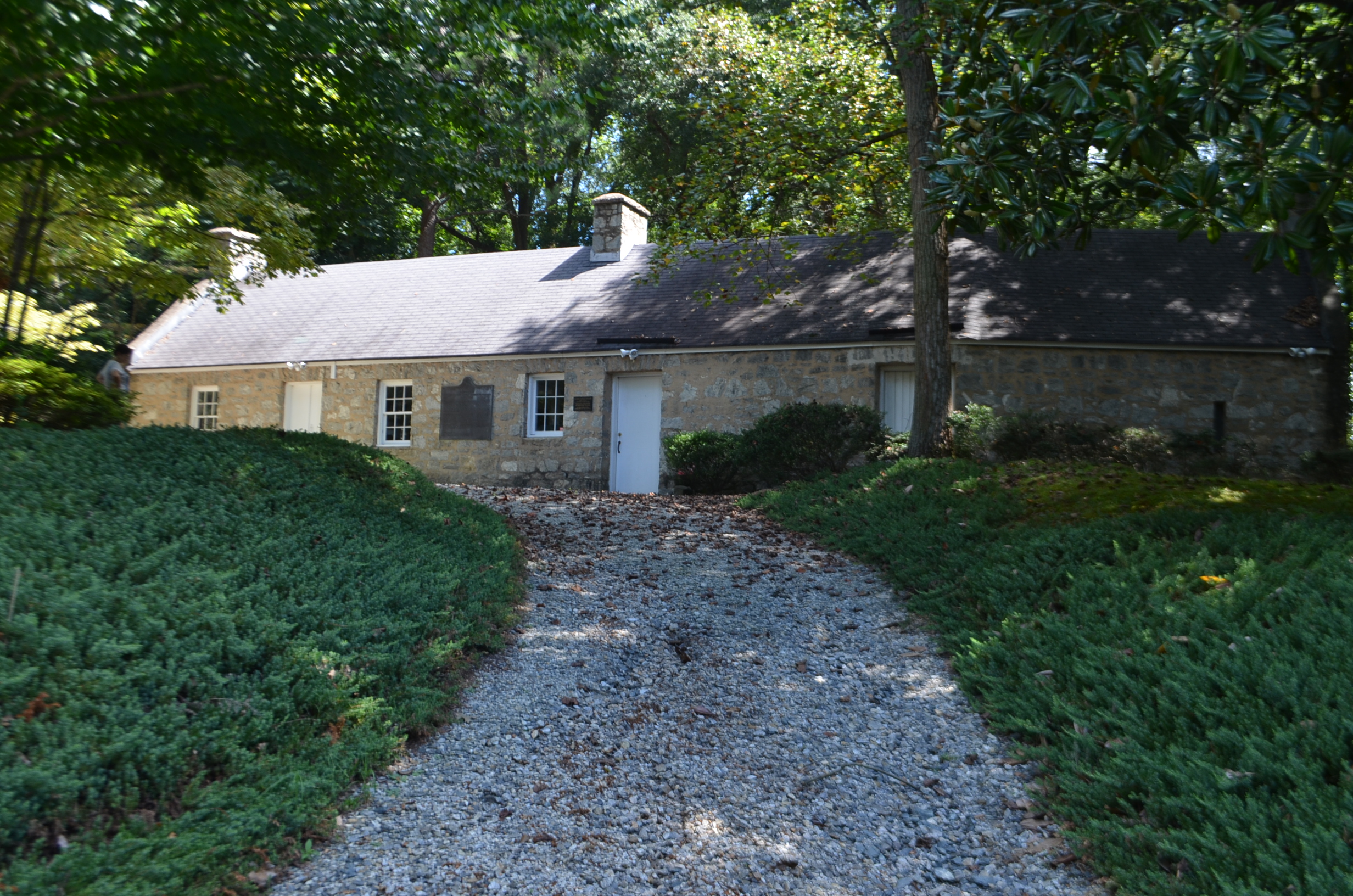

- Location within Atlanta Location within Georgia Location within the United States
- Location: Atlanta, Georgia
- Coordinates: 33°43′37″N 84°21′20″W
- Built: 1911
- Architect: Thomas Henry Morgan, Robert M. McWhirter
- NRHP reference No.: 83003572
- Added to NRHP: December 1, 1983

The Burns Cottage in Atlanta, Georgia (USA), is a replica of the birthplace of Robert Burns in Scotland. The Atlanta cottage was built by the Burns Club Atlanta in 1911, using measurements of the original cottage. The interior was adapted for club use, with a meeting room replacing the barn and byre.

== Gallery ==
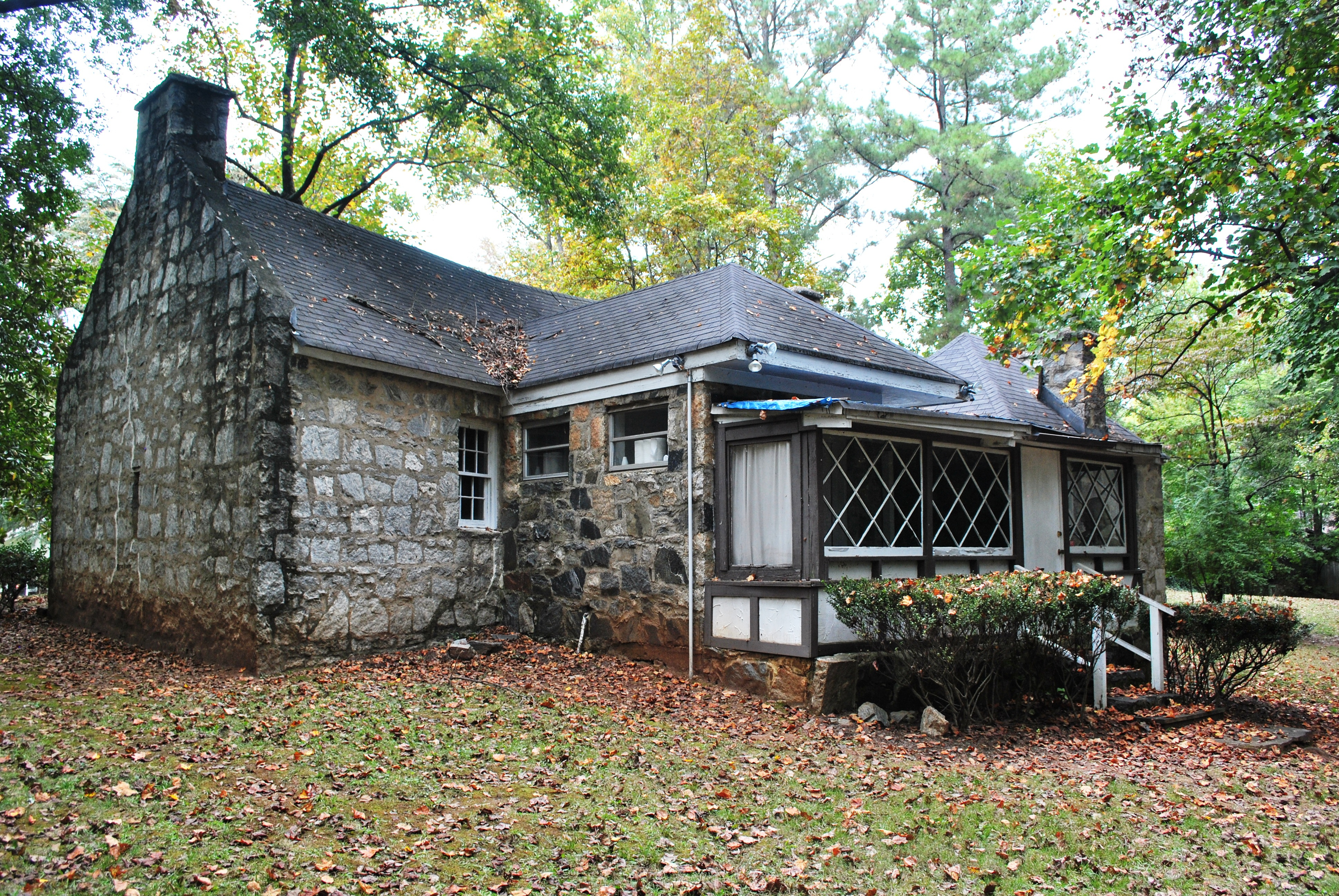
Burns Cottage

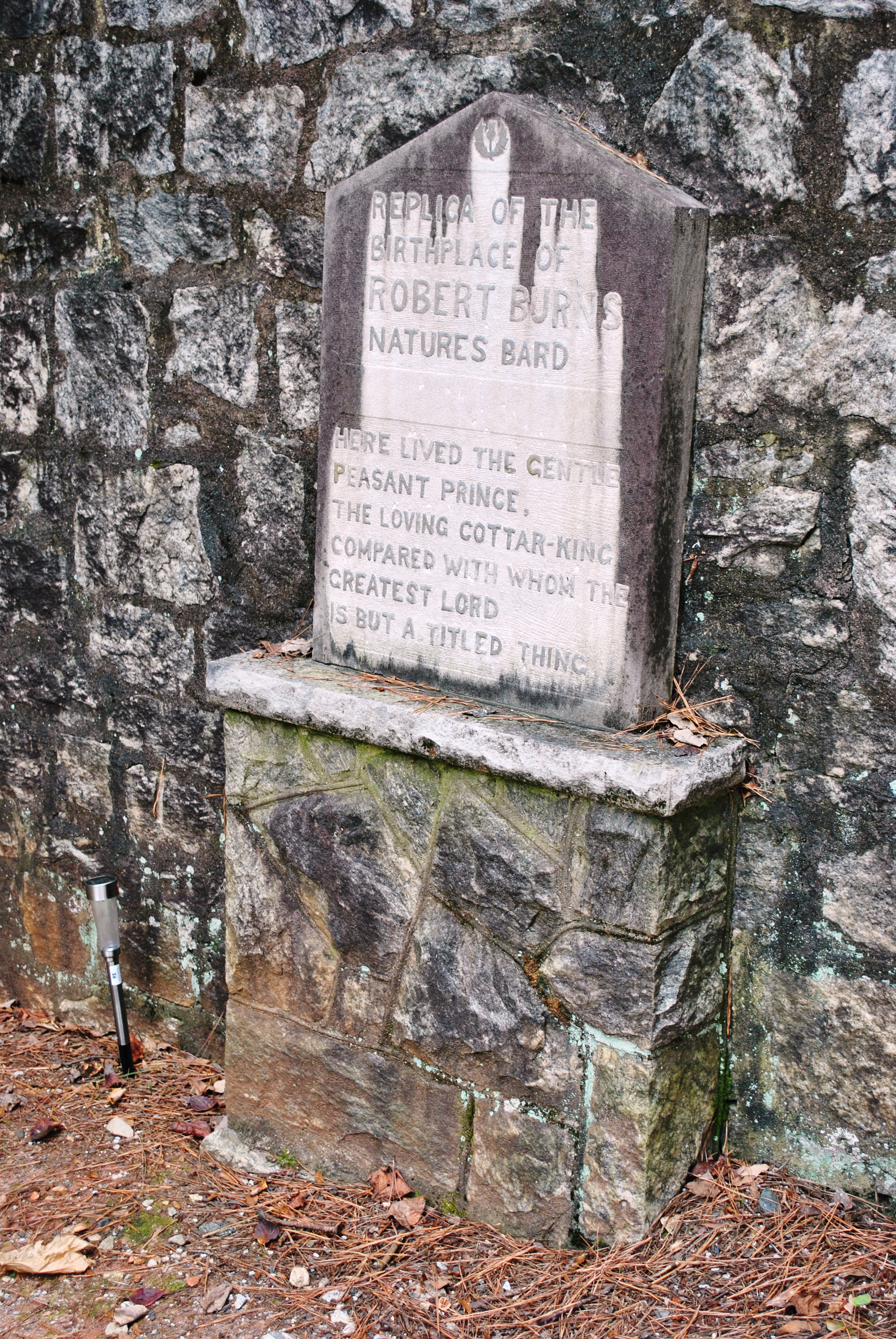
Burns Cottage

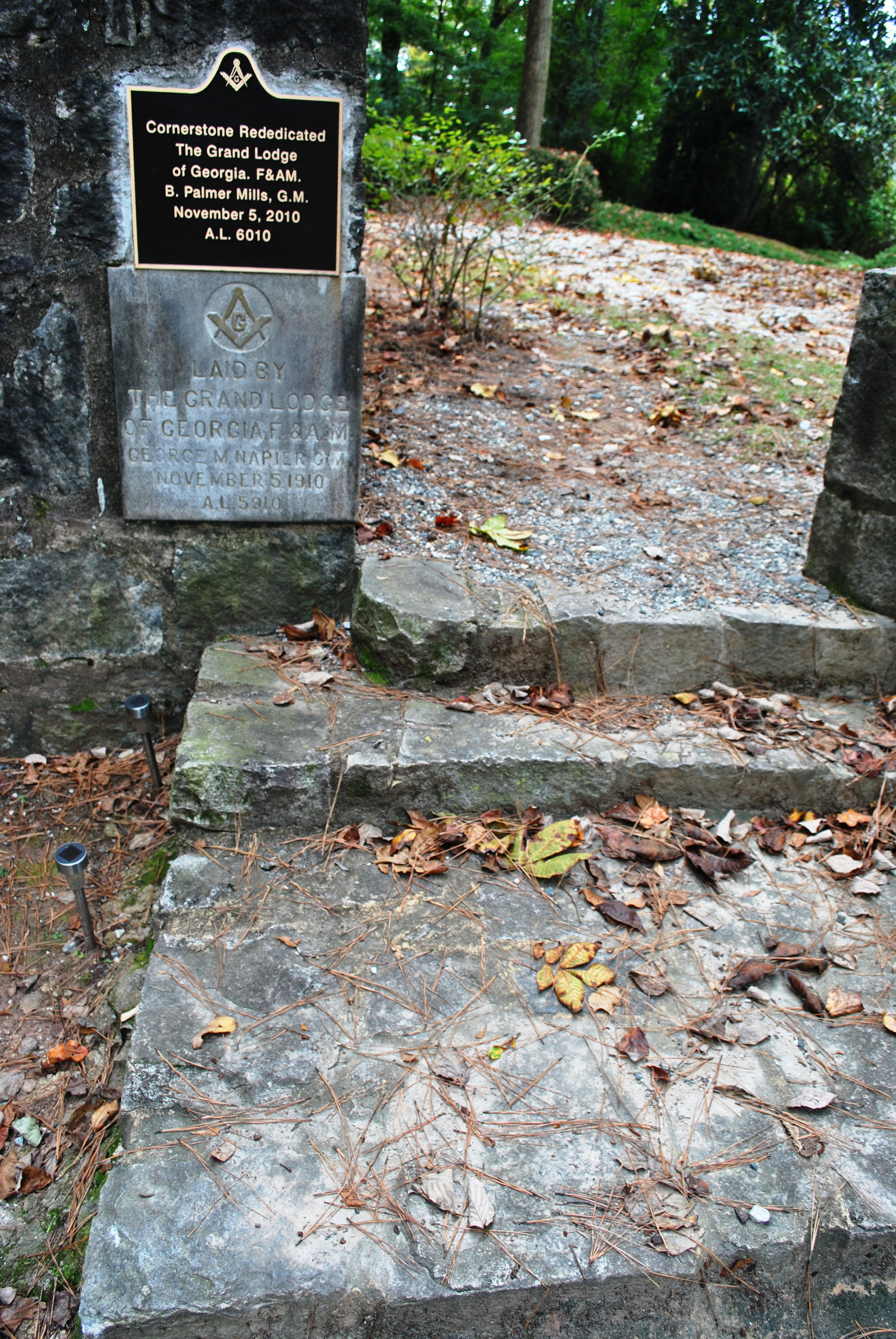
Burns Cottage

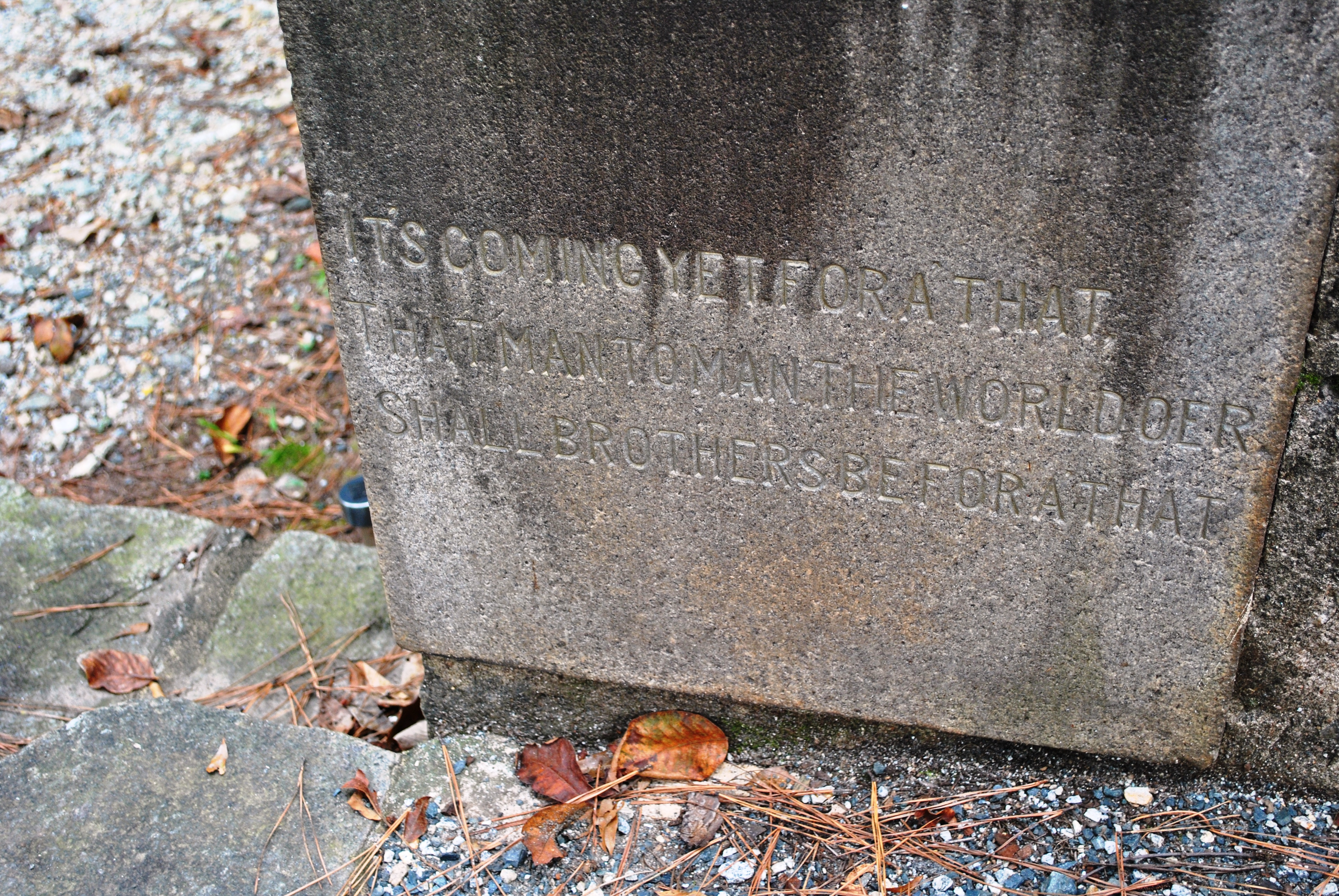
Burns Cottage

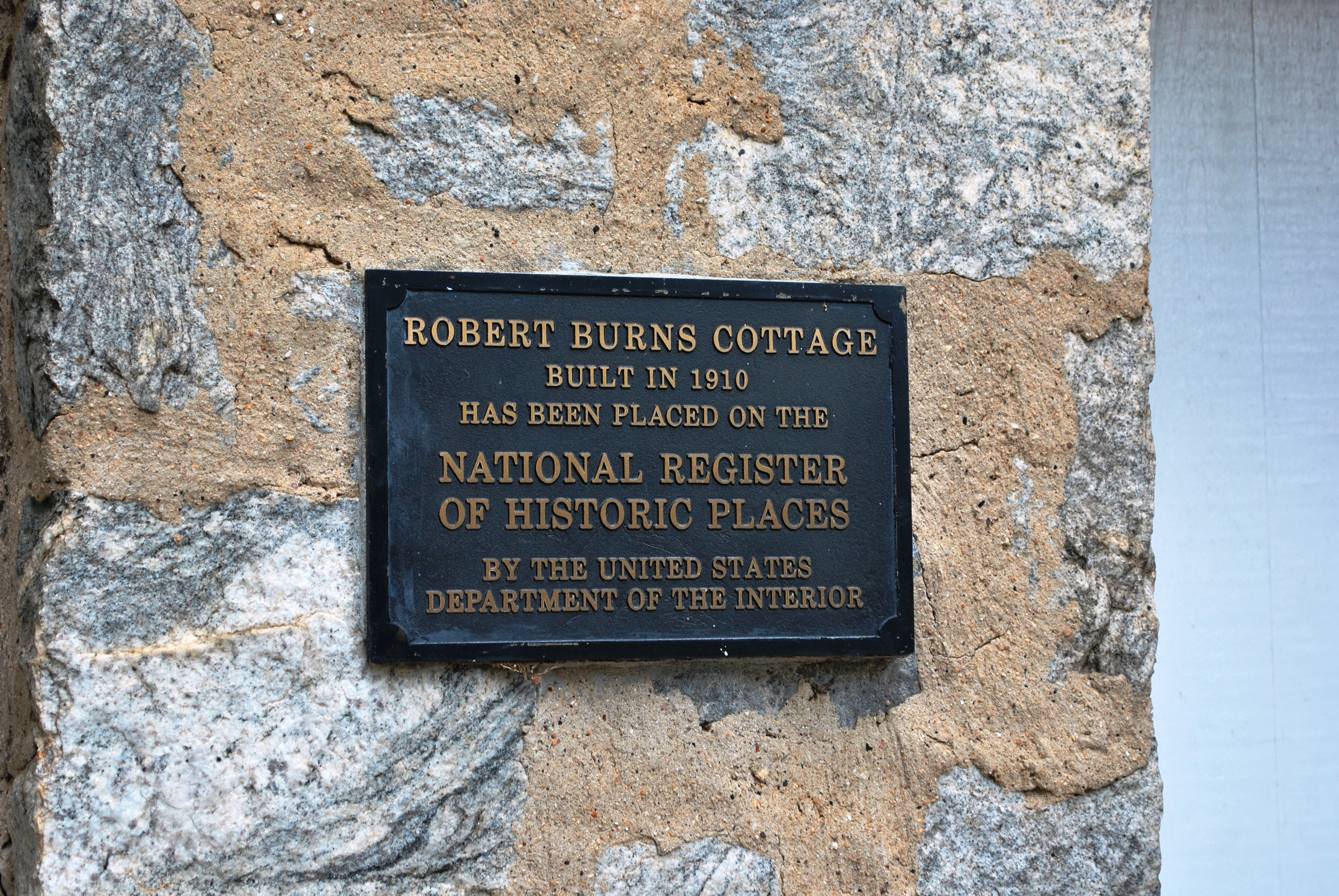
Burns Cottage

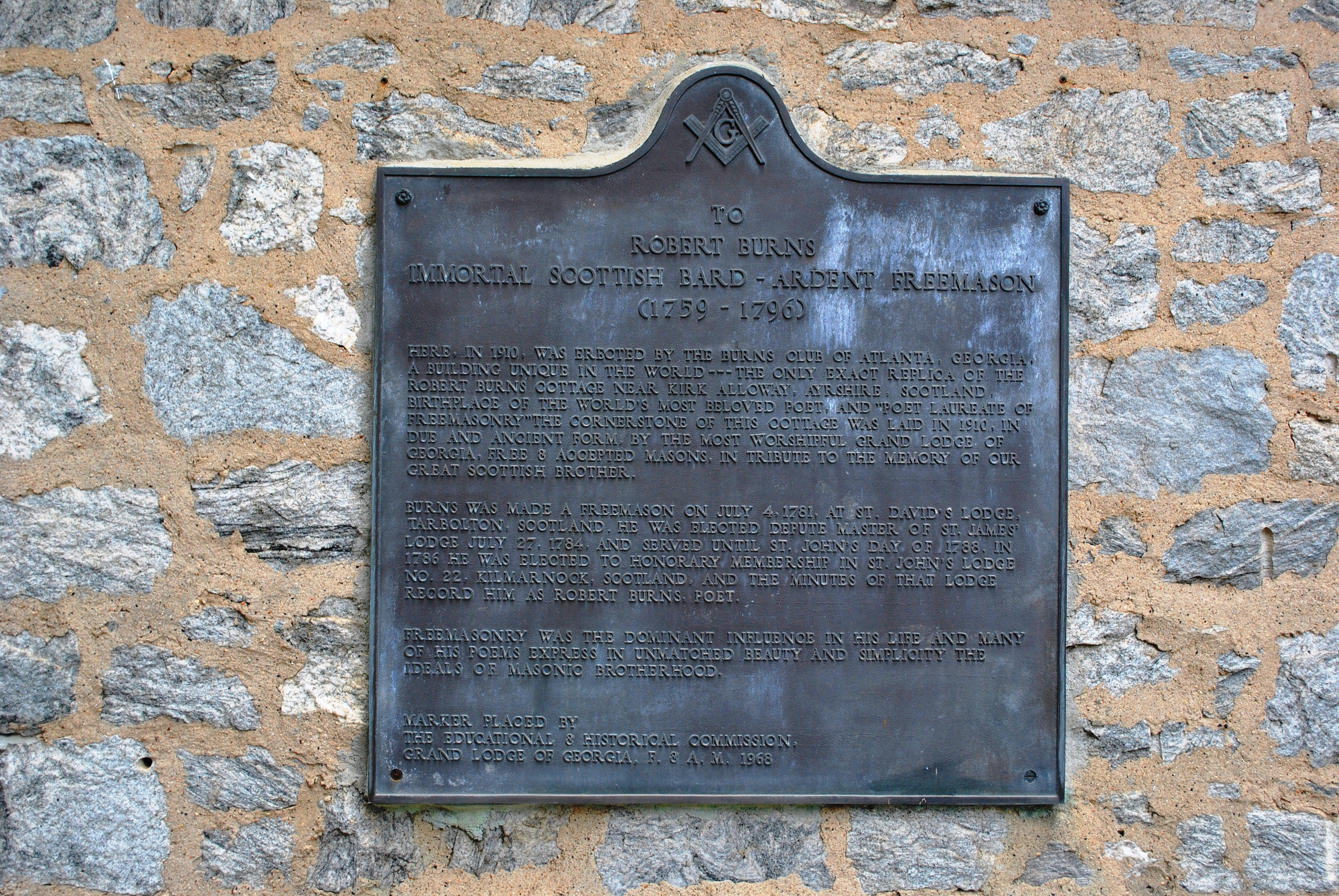
Burns Cottage

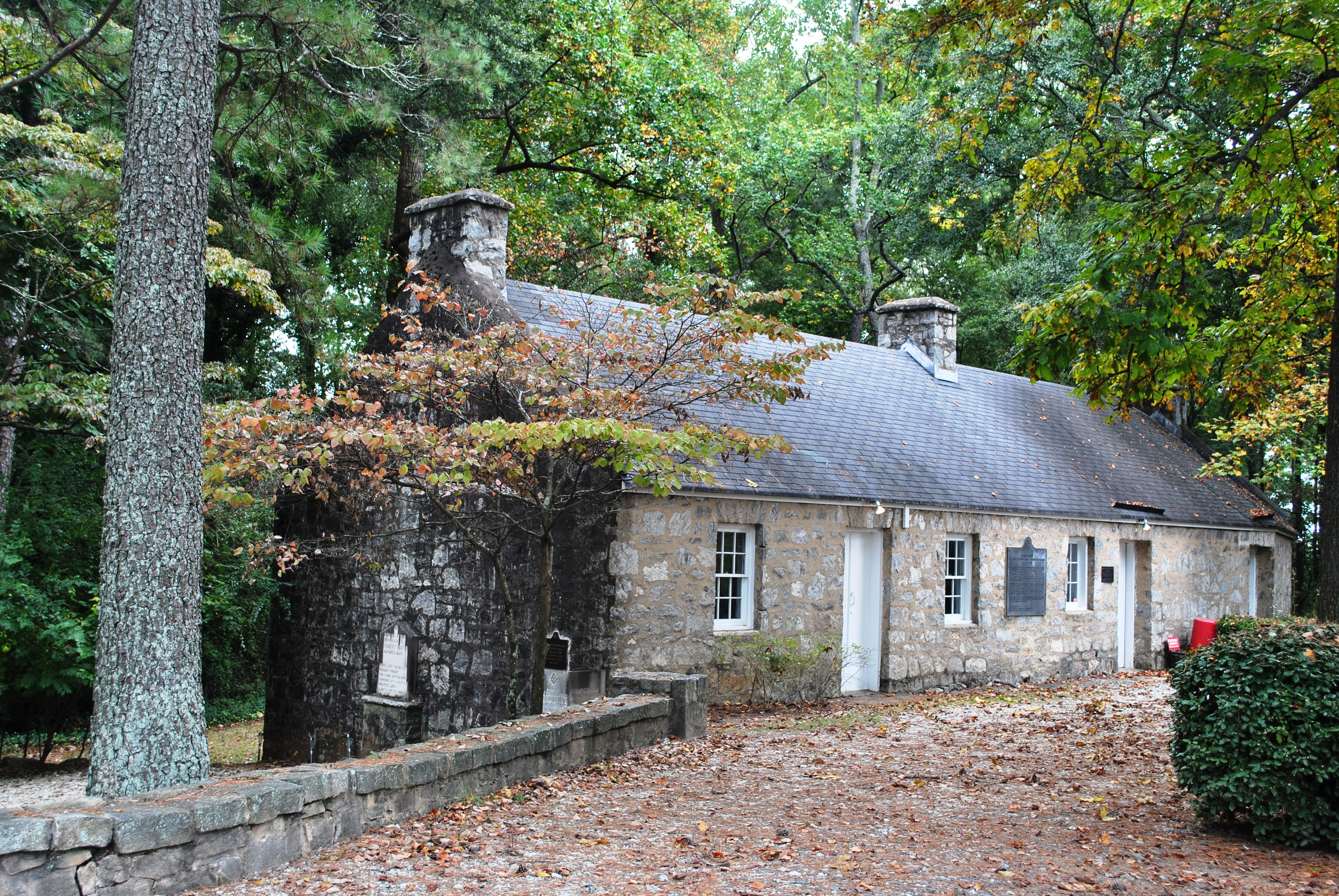
Burns Cottage
