= Union Station (Columbus, Georgia) =

Historic train stop in Columbus, Georgia, US

Coordinates: 32°28′08″N 84°59′04″W

- Central of Georgia Railroad Terminal
- U.S. National Register of Historic Places
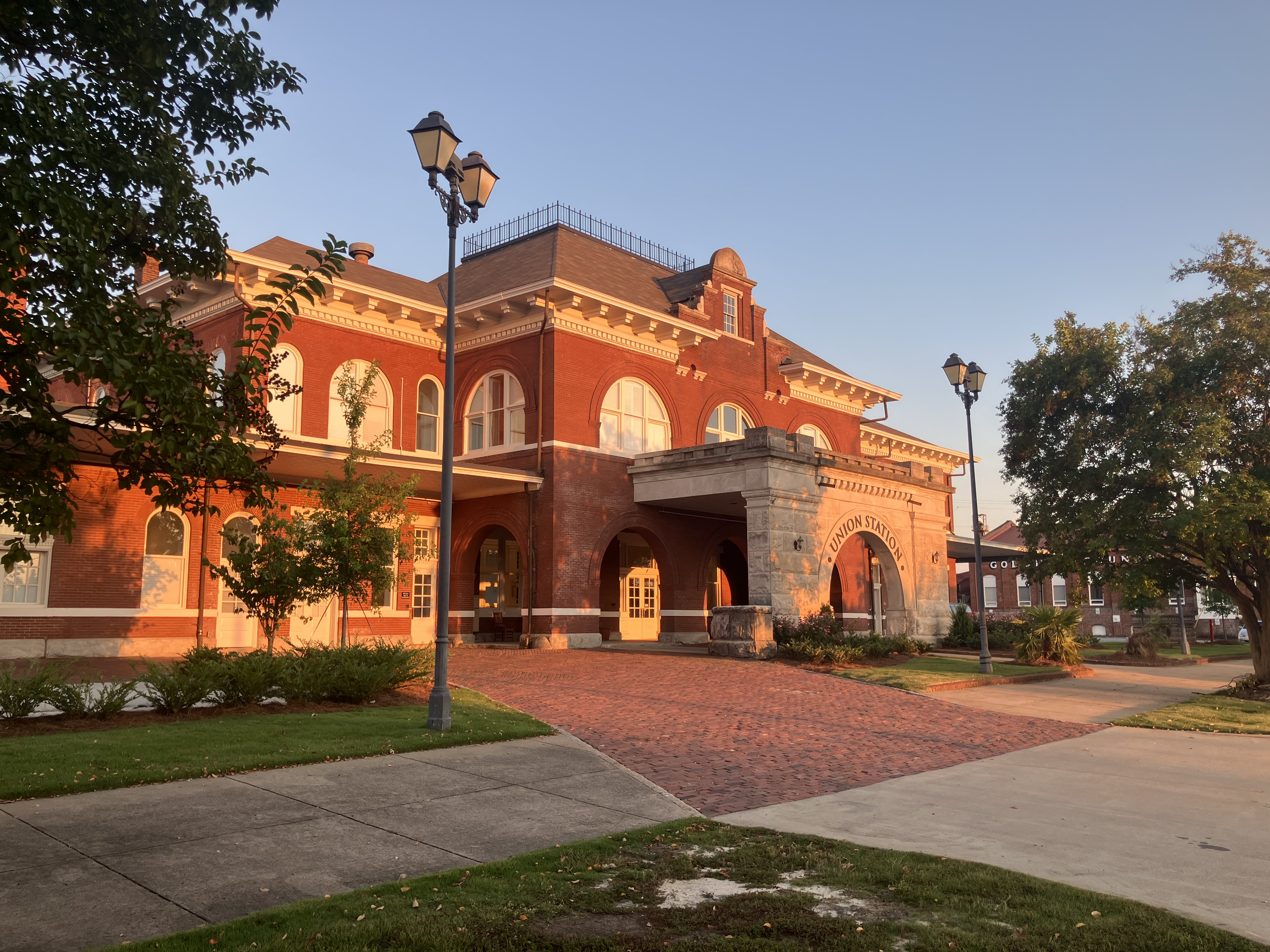
- Union Station in September 2025
- Location: 1200 Sixth Avenue, Columbus, Georgia, U.S.
- Built: 1901
- Architect: Bruce & Morgan
- MPS: Columbus MRA
- NRHP reference No.: 80001149
- Added to NRHP: September 29, 1980

Columbus Union Station is a former union station in Columbus, Georgia that is now utilized as mixed-use development. The building was constructed in 1901 as the Central of Georgia Railroad Terminal and was designed in the Second Empire style by the architectural firm, Bruce and Morgan. The station hosted the Central Railroad of Georgia, the Seaboard Air Line Railroad and the Southern Railway. It is located at 1200 Sixth Avenue, directly north of 12th Street, in Downtown Columbus.

== Location ==
Union Station is located at 1200 Sixth Avenue, directly north of 12th Street and two blocks east of Veterans Parkway (U.S. Route 27) on the east side of Downtown Columbus. The station occupies the entire southern half of the city block bounded by Sixth Avenue, 12th Street, 13th Street, and the former Central of Georgia railyard, which is currently used by Norfolk Southern.

== History ==
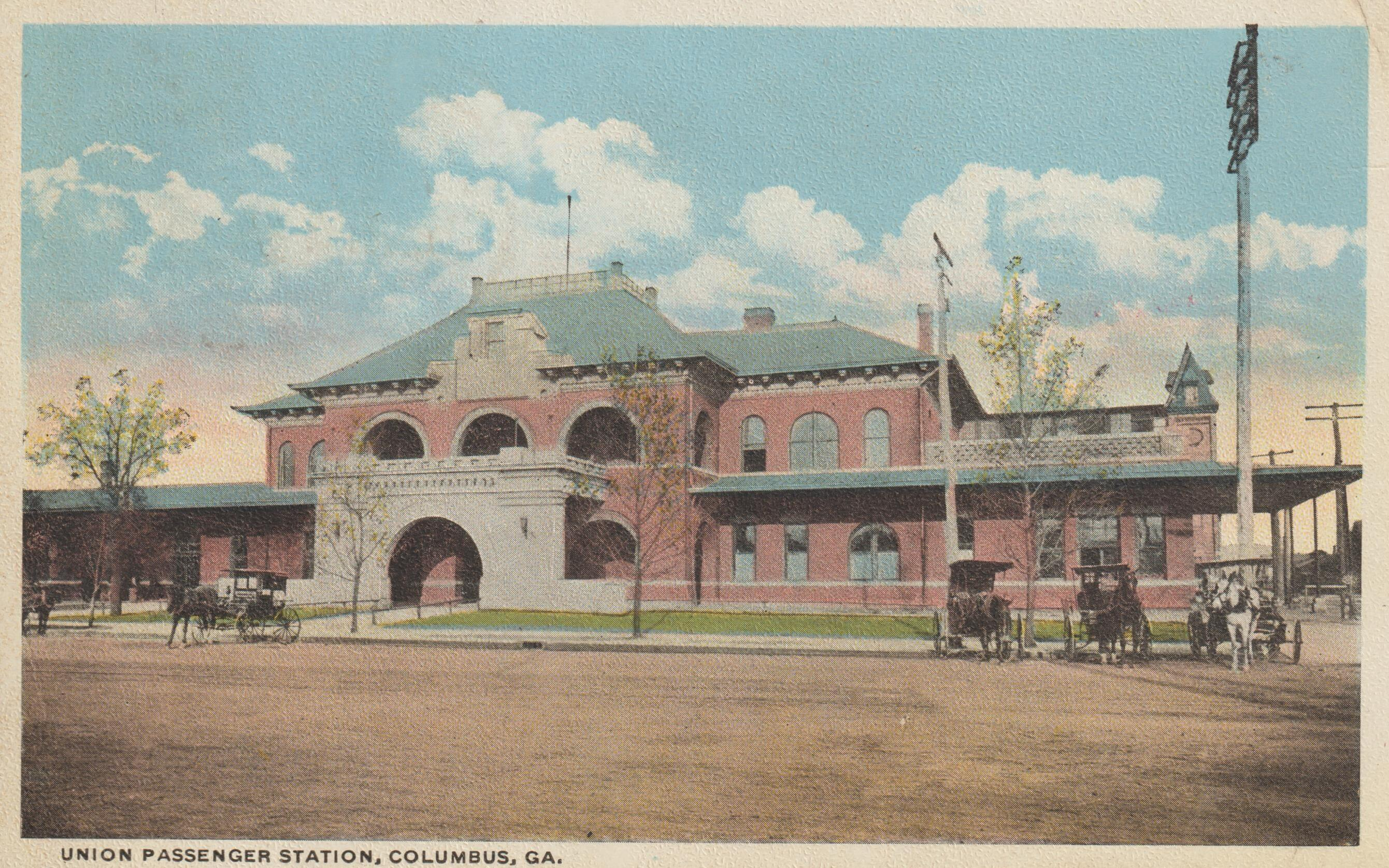
Union Station in its earliest years

The building was constructed in 1901 as the Central of Georgia Railroad Terminal and was designed in the Second Empire style by Atlanta-based architectural firm, Bruce and Morgan. The passenger terminal building replaced a terminal built in 1881 that was also operated by the Central of Georgia Railroad.

=== Historic rail service ===
==== Seaboard Air Line ====
By 1932 Seaboard Air Line Railroad (SAL) passenger trains stopped calling at the station, as the railroad's operations through Columbus became freight-only. The SAL previously had run passenger trains to Richland, then to Albany.

At the opening of the 1940s service included:

==== Southern Railway ====
Southern Railway operated a local train from Columbus to Atlanta via Warm Springs, Griffin, and McDonough. Passenger service on this route was discontinued between 1946 and 1949.

==== Central of Georgia ====
  - City of Miami (Chicago - Miami)
  - Floridan (Chicago - Miami)
  - Man O' War (Atlanta - Columbus via Newnan)
  - Seminole (Chicago - Jacksonville, with through sleepers to Miami)

Additionally, the Central of Georgia operated local morning and afternoon trains from Birmingham through Columbus to Macon. In the latter 1940s and early 1950s this became a night train route with trains going continuous beyond Macon to Savannah (Central of Georgia Depot). By late 1953 all passenger service between Columbus and Macon had ended.

The last trains operating out of Columbus in early 1971 were the Man O' War and the City of Miami. Passenger services ended and the station closed, with the passing of passenger operations to Amtrak on May 1, 1971.

=== Use since the end of rail services ===
Union Station was nominated for inclusion on the National Register of Historic Places as part of a Multiple Property Submission by the Lower Chattahoochee Valley Area Planning and Development Commission and Historic Columbus Foundation. The station was added to the National Register of Historic Places in 1980. Despite its inclusion to the register, the building was vulnerable to demolition. Various activists, the Historic Columbus Foundation, Southern Railway System, and the Consolidated Government of Columbus mobilized to save the station.

After the building was renovated in 1987, the station served as the corporate headquarters of financial technology company TSYS until 1999. Following TSYS's departure, the Columbus Georgia Chamber of Commerce began utilizing the building beginning in August 2001. By 2016, the station building was put up for sale once more. Following its sale for $1.1 million in 2024, the building was converted to mixed-use development in 2025 with the total cost of the remodeling project totaling about $5 million. Following the mixed-use conversion, the former station building contains apartments, offices, and an event space.

Preceding station	Central of Georgia Railway	Following station
Phenix City toward Birmingham	Birmingham – Fort Valley	Muscogee toward Fort Valley
Girard toward Andalusia	Andalusia – Newnan	Fortson toward Newnan
Terminus	Columbus – Americus	Muscogee toward Americus
Preceding station	Southern Railway	Following station
Terminus	Columbus, GA – Atlanta	Flat Rock toward Atlanta Terminal
Preceding station	Seaboard Air Line Railroad	Following station
Terminus	Columbus-St Marks	Cusseta toward St. Marks
