= Monroe Commercial Historic District =

Historic district in Georgia, United States

- U.S. National Register of Historic Places
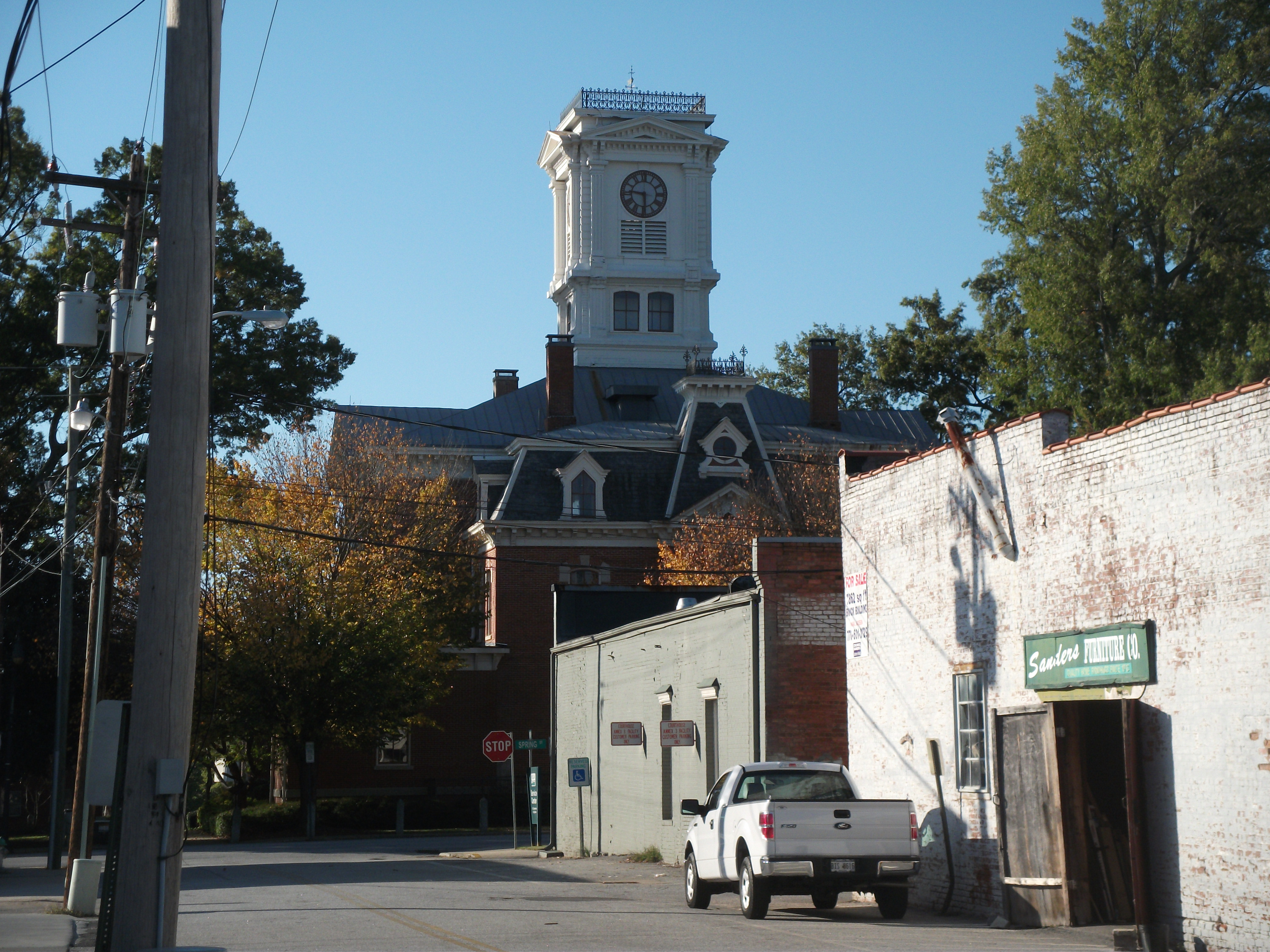

- Location within Georgia
- Location: Spring and Broad Sts., Monroe, Georgia
- Coordinates: 33°47′40″N 83°42′46″W
- Area: 14 acres (5.7 ha)
- Built: 1820
- Architect: Multiple; Bruce & Morgan
- Architectural style: Classical Revival, Late Victorian
- MPS: Monroe MRA
- NRHP reference No.: 83003619
- Added to NRHP: December 28, 1983

The Monroe Commercial Historic District is a 14 acres (5.7 ha) historic district in Monroe, Georgia which was listed on the National Register of Historic Places in 1983. The listing included 33 contributing buildings.

Location: Spring and Broad Sts.

It includes work by architects Bruce & Morgan.

Architecture: Classical Revival, Late Victorian

It includes the Walton Hotel.

It includes the courthouse square of the Walton County Courthouse and surrounding commercial buildings.
