= Fannin-Cooper Farm =

Historic house in Paulding County, Georgia, US

- U.S. National Register of Historic Places
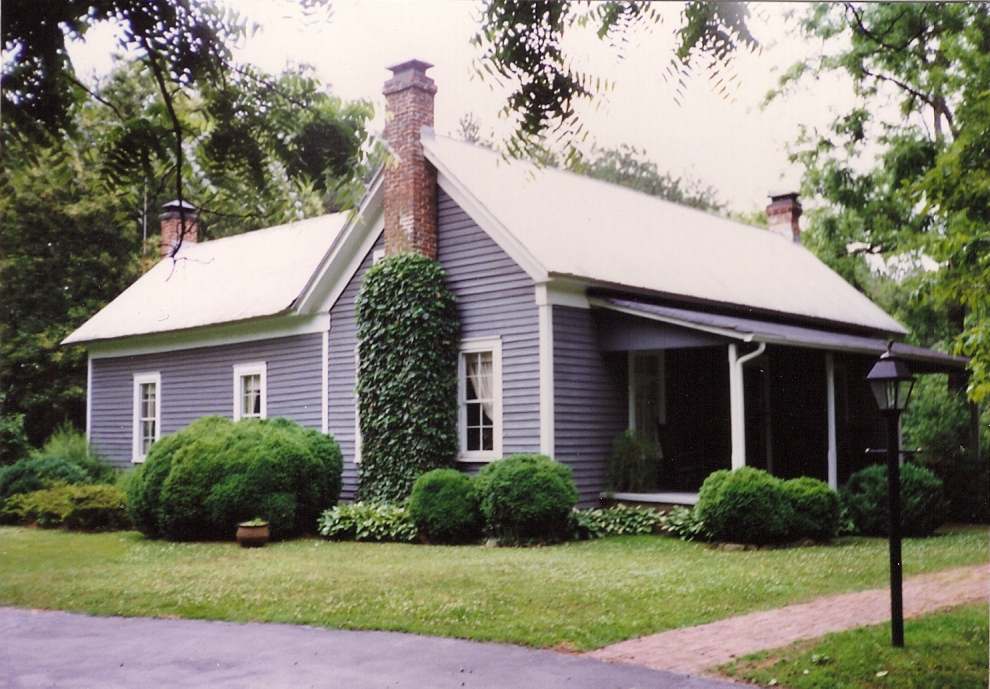
- 620 Smith front

- Location within Georgia
- Nearest city: Hiram, Georgia
- Coordinates: 33.91434°N 84.7362°W
- Area: 82.2 acres (33.3 ha)
- Built: 1882, 1887
- Architectural style: Central-Hall, Double-pen
- NRHP reference No.: 12000411
- Added to NRHP: July 17, 2012

The Fannin-Cooper Farm, near Hiram in Paulding County, Georgia, was listed on the National Register of Historic Places in 2012. It is spread across both sides of Smith Road, including parcels at 620 and 511 Smith Rd., and is located about 7 miles (11 km) east of Paulding County seat Dallas, Georgia.

Its main farmhouse, built in 1887, is a one-story, central hall plan house with a shed-roof front porch.

== Structures ==
The listing included four contributing buildings, two other contributing structures, and a contributing site, on 82.2 acres (33.3 ha). It includes a corn crib built in 1882 and a two-story mule barn.
