= Monroe County Courthouse (Georgia) =

Historic courthouse in the US state of Georgia

- U.S. National Register of Historic Places
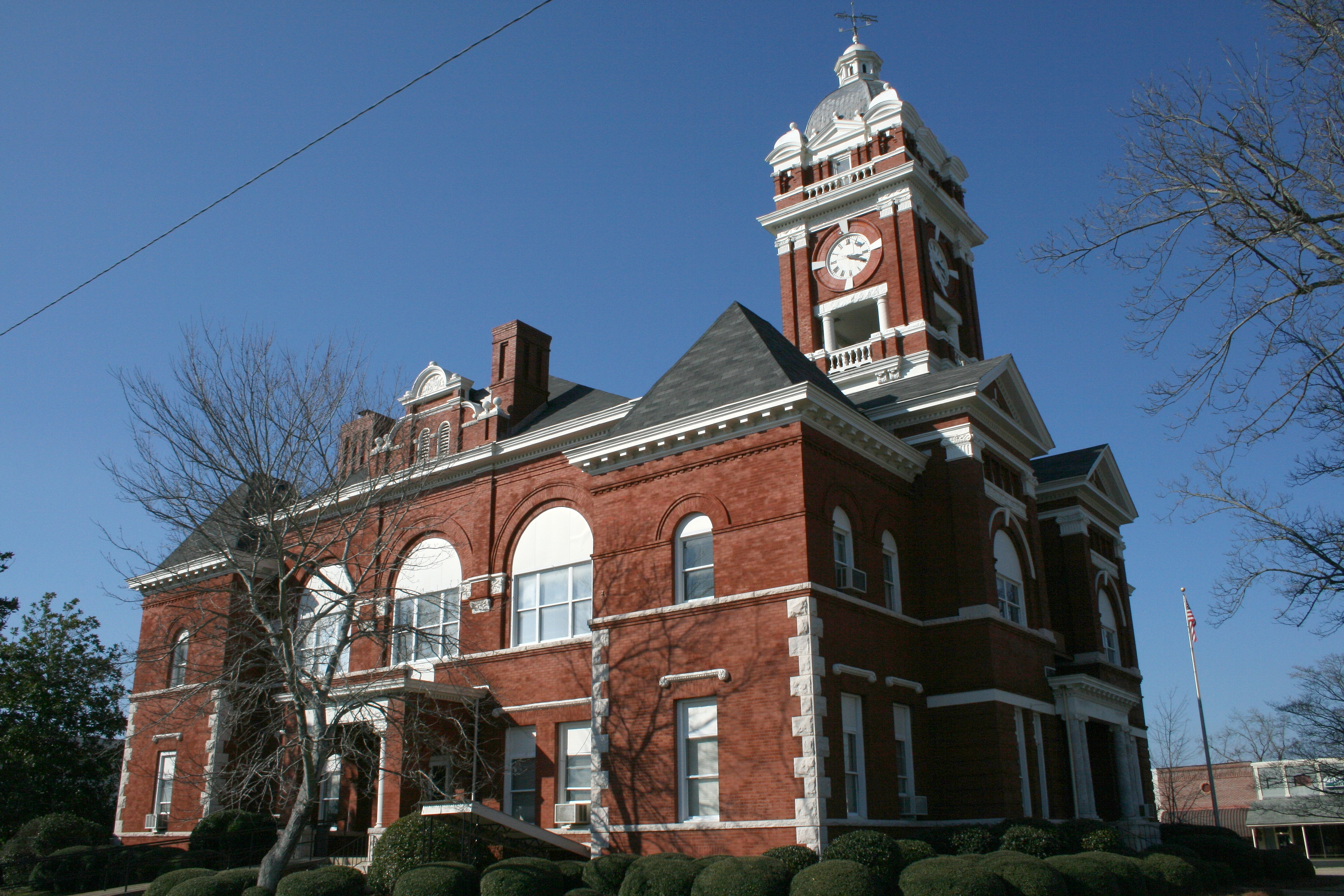

- Location within Georgia Location within the United States
- Interactive map showing the location for Monroe County Courthouse
- Location: Courthouse Sq., Forsyth, Georgia
- Coordinates: 33°2′3″N 83°56′20″W
- Area: 2 acres (0.81 ha)
- Built: 1896; 130 years ago
- Built by: Knoxville Building & Construction
- Architect: Bruce & Morgan
- Architectural style: High Victorian
- MPS: Georgia County Courthouses TR
- NRHP reference No.: 80001121
- Added to NRHP: September 18, 1980

The Monroe County Courthouse is the courthouse for Monroe County, Georgia in Forsyth, which was built in 1896. It was designed by architects Bruce & Morgan, who also designed the similar Butts County Courthouse built two years later. It was listed on the National Register of Historic Places in 1980.

The courtroom was called "one of the most impressive in Georgia" in its National Register nomination.
