= Newton County Courthouse (Georgia) =

- U.S. National Register of Historic Places
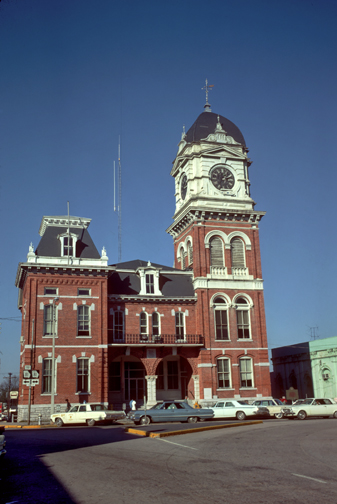
- Newton County Courthouse (photograph by Calvin Beale taken in 1969)

- Location within Georgia Location within the United States
- Interactive map showing the location of Newton County Courthouse
- Location: Courthouse Sq., Covington, Georgia
- Coordinates: 33°35′49″N 83°51′37″W
- Area: less than one acre
- Built: 1884
- Architect: Bruce & Morgan; Smith, James
- Architectural style: Second Empire
- MPS: Georgia County Courthouses TR
- NRHP reference No.: 80001216
- Added to NRHP: September 18, 1980

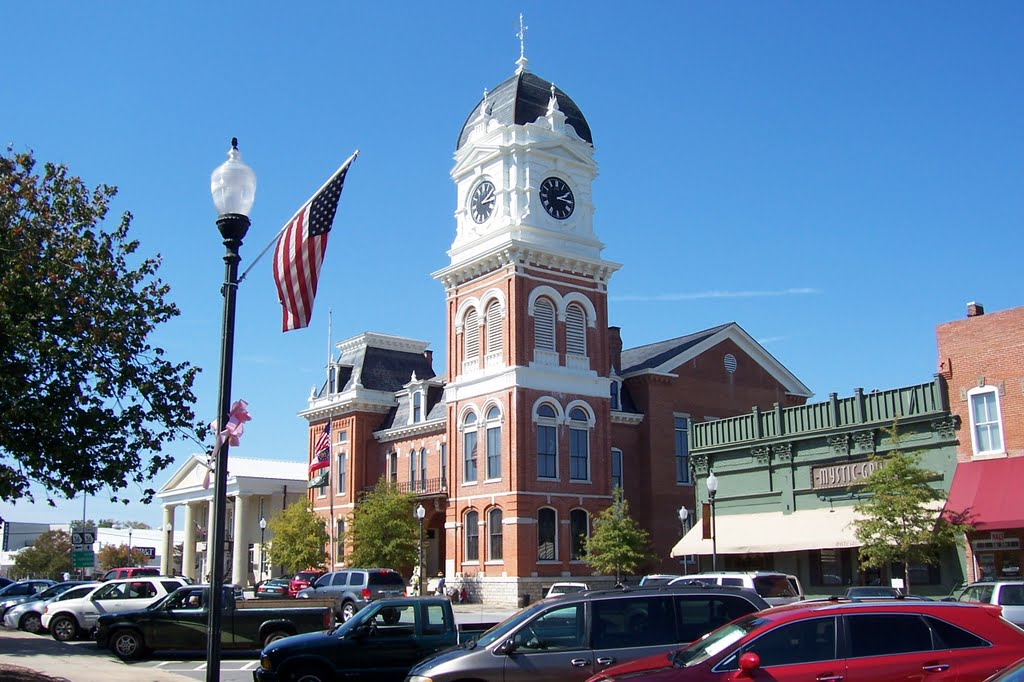
Newton County Courthouse - 2012

Newton County Courthouse is a historic county courthouse in Courthouse Square in Covington, Georgia, the county seat of Newton County, Georgia. The courthouse was designed by Bruce & Morgan in a Second Empire architecture style and built in 1884. It was constructed on the same site as a previous county courthouse building that burned down on December 31, 1883. The building was added to the National Register of Historic Places on September 18, 1980.

The courthouse features in two postcards from around 1907.

== See also ==
- National Register of Historic Places listings in Newton County, Georgia
