= Walton County Courthouse (Georgia) =

- U.S. National Register of Historic Places
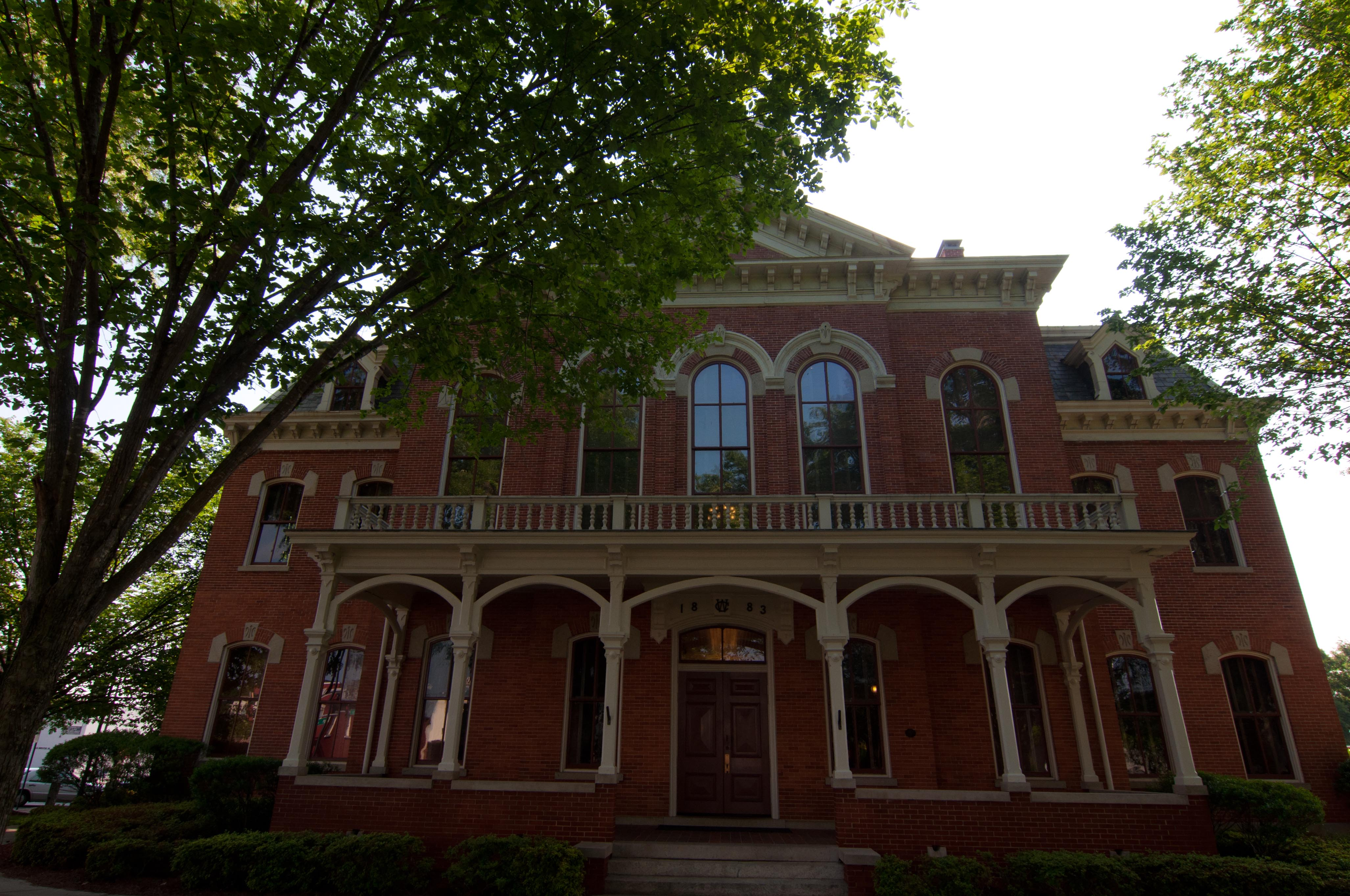

- Location within Georgia
- Interactive map showing the location for Walton County Courthouse
- Location: Courthouse Sq., Monroe, Georgia
- Coordinates: 33°47′40″N 83°42′45″W
- Area: 2 acres (0.81 ha)
- Built: 1883
- Built by: Smith, James
- Architect: Bruce & Morgan
- Architectural style: Second Empire
- Part of: Monroe Commercial Historic District
- MPS: Georgia County Courthouses TR
- NRHP reference No.: 80001256
- Added to NRHP: September 18, 1980

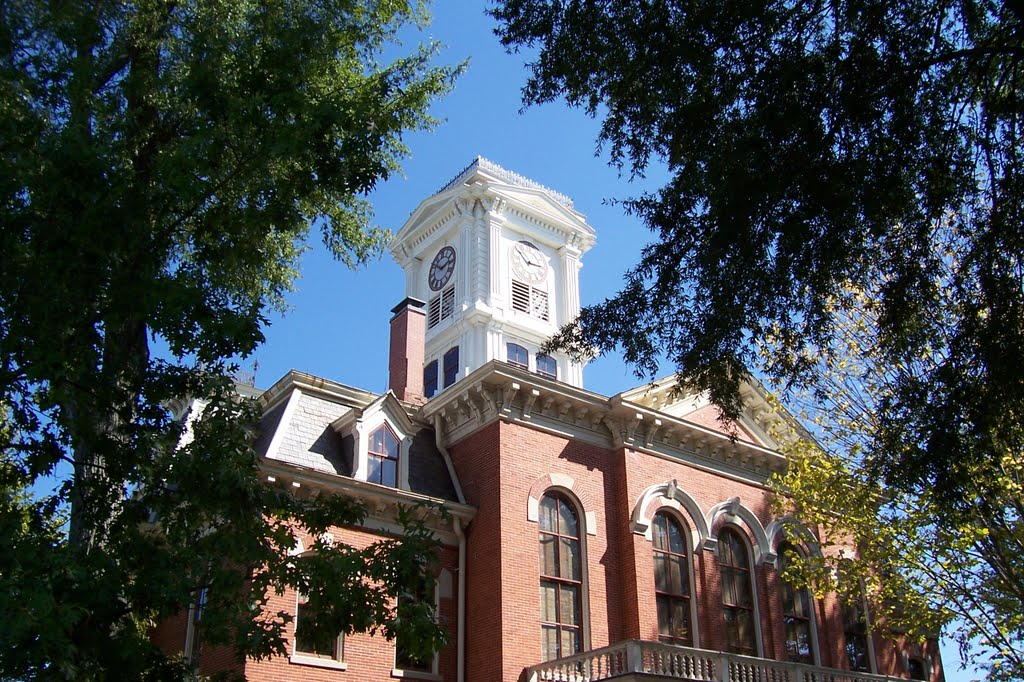
Walton County Courthouse - December 2012

The Walton County Courthouse in Monroe, Georgia was built in 1883. It was designed by architects Bruce & Morgan in Second Empire style. It was listed on the National Register of Historic Places in 1980.

It was built at cost of $23,865 during 1883–84.

It is also a contributing building in the NRHP-listed Monroe Commercial Historic District.
