= Haralson County Courthouse =

- U.S. National Register of Historic Places
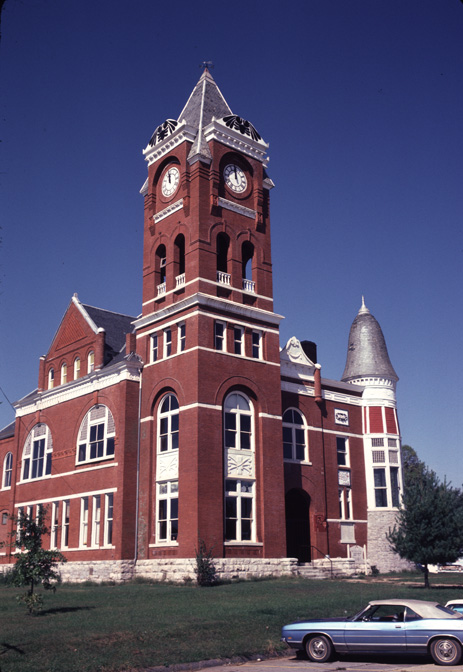
- Photo in 1980 by Calvin Beale

- Location within Georgia Location within the United States
- Location: Courthouse Sq., Buchanan, Georgia
- Coordinates: 33°48′6″N 85°11′23″W
- Area: less than one acre
- Built: 1891
- Architect: Bruce, Alexander C.; Morgan, Thomas H.
- Architectural style: Queen Anne
- MPS: Georgia County Courthouses TR (AD)
- NRHP reference No.: 74000688
- Added to NRHP: June 7, 1974

The Haralson County Courthouse, located on Courthouse Square in Buchanan, Georgia, is a historic Queen Anne style building built in 1891–92. It was designed by Alexander C. Bruce and Thomas H. Morgan, Bruce & Morgan. It was listed on the National Register of Historic Places in 1974. The courthouse served as the county courthouse from 1892 to 1972; a modern courthouse less than a mile away has since replaced it.

The old courthouse building currently serves as a museum and the location of the Haralson County Historical Society.
