= Talbot County Courthouse (Georgia) =

- U.S. National Register of Historic Places
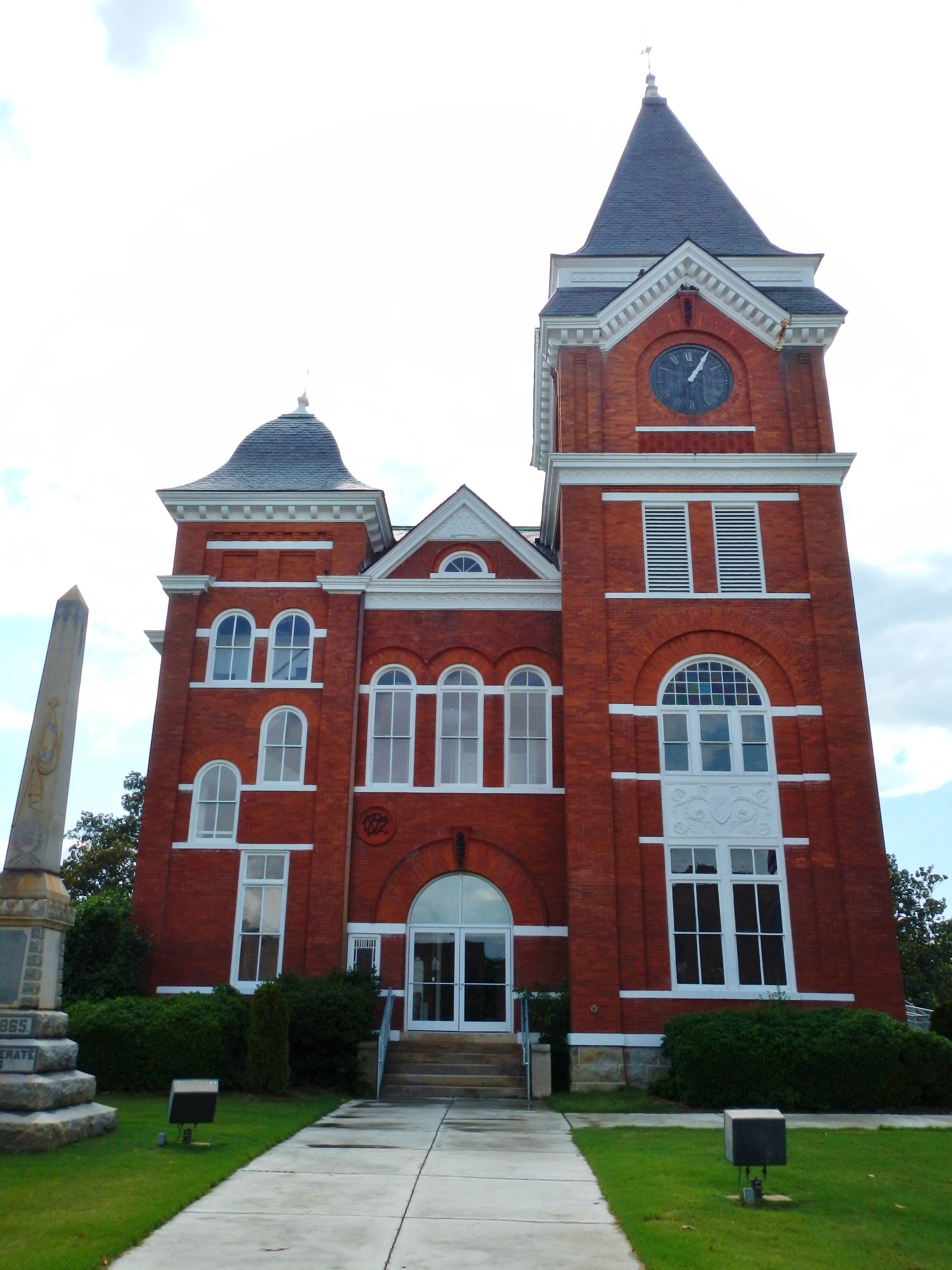

- Location within Georgia
- Location: Courthouse Sq., Talbotton, Georgia
- Coordinates: 32°40′37″N 84°32′27″W
- Area: 2 acres (0.81 ha)
- Built: 1892
- Built by: Westbrook & Bennett
- Architect: Bruce & Morgan
- Architectural style: Queen Anne
- MPS: Georgia County Courthouses TR
- NRHP reference No.: 80001241
- Added to NRHP: September 18, 1980

The Talbot County Courthouse, on Courthouse Sq. in Talbotton, Georgia, is a brick County courthouse that was built in 1892. It was listed on the National Register of Historic Places in 1980.

It was designed by architects Bruce & Morgan in Queen Anne style and "is smaller and more picturesque than many of their courthouses."

It has a tall, pyramidally topped clock tower on the east corner, and a squat bell-capped tower on the west corner, linked by a gable. It has a Romanesque arched entryway.
