= Paulding County Courthouse (Georgia) =

Historic courthouse in Dallas, Georgia, US

Coordinates: 33.9240°N 84.8413°W

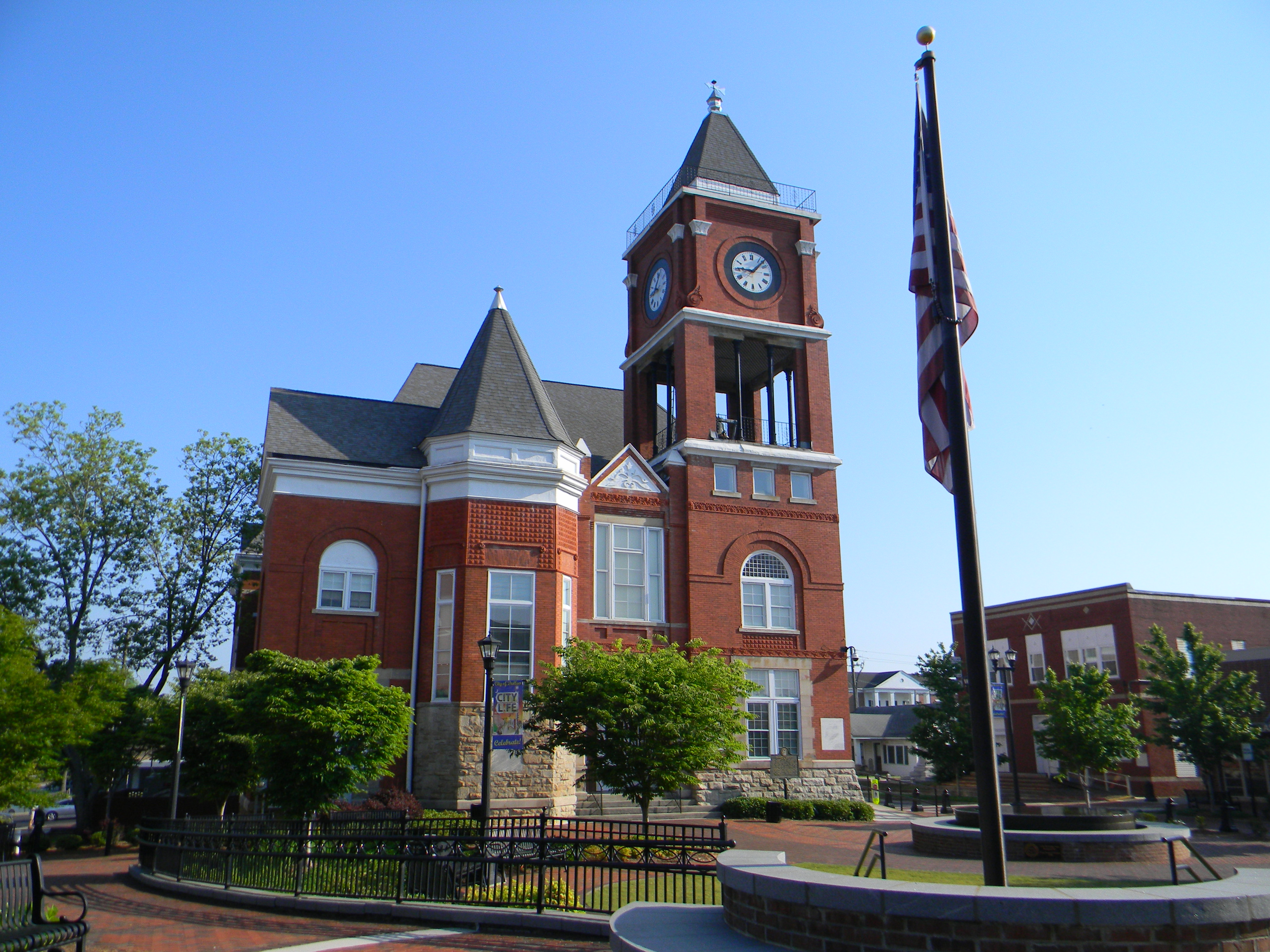
Old Paulding County Courthouse

The Old Paulding County Courthouse is a historic county courthouse in the courthouse square of Dallas, Georgia, county seat of Paulding County, Georgia. It was built in 1892 and has been renovated several times since. An annex was added. The original building was designed by Bruce & Morgan and is Queen Anne in style. It was added to the National Register of Historic Places on September 18, 1980.

== See also ==
- National Register of Historic Places listings in Paulding County, Georgia
