= National Register of Historic Places listings in Butts County, Georgia =

This is a list of properties and districts in Butts County, Georgia that are listed on the National Register of Historic Places (NRHP).

This National Park Service list is complete through NPS recent listings posted March 21, 2025.

== Current listings ==
	Name on the Register	Image	Date listed	Location	City or town	Description
1	Butts County Courthouse	Butts County Courthouse	September 18, 1980 (#80000982)	Courthouse Sq. 33°17′41″N 83°58′01″W	Jackson	
2	J. R. Carmichael House	J. R. Carmichael House	July 13, 1977 (#77000411)	149 McDonough Rd. 33°17′42″N 83°58′15″W	Jackson	
3	Idlewilde	Idlewilde	March 12, 1999 (#99000293)	Lake Clark Rd., Indian Springs State Park; 33°14′51″N 83°55′23″W	Indian Springs	
4	Indian Springs Hotel	Indian Springs Hotel	May 7, 1973 (#73000612)	GA 42; 33°14′43″N 83°55′12″W	Indian Springs	
