= Idlewilde (Indian Springs, Georgia) =

- U.S. National Register of Historic Places
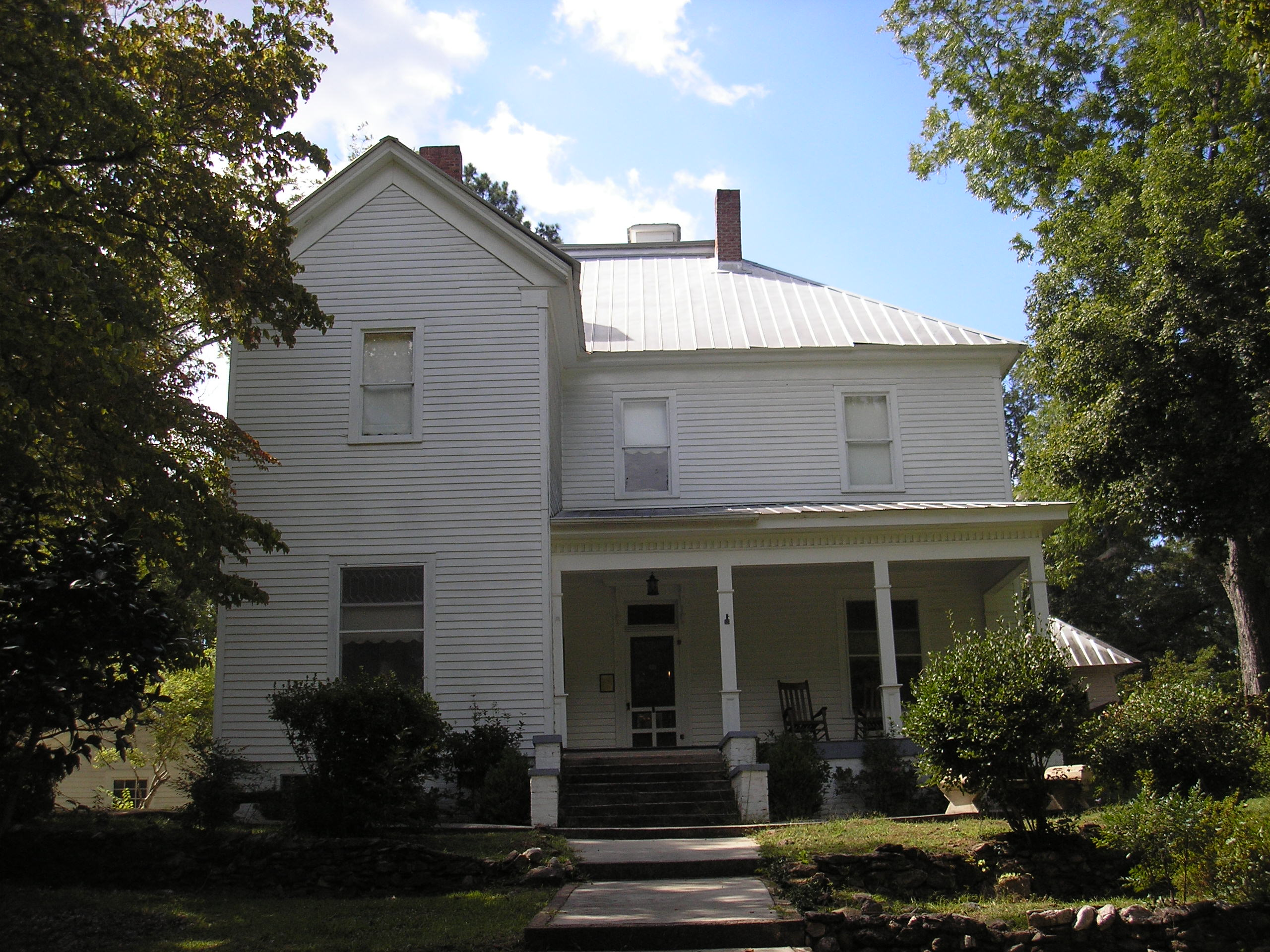

- Location within Georgia Location within the United States
- Location: Lake Clark Rd., Indian Springs State Park, Indian Springs, Georgia
- Coordinates: 33°14′51″N 83°55′23″W
- Area: 2.7 acres (1.1 ha)
- Built: 1908
- Architectural style: New South house
- NRHP reference No.: 99000293
- Added to NRHP: March 12, 1999

Idlewilde is a historic boarding house site built between 1907 and 1910 at what is now the Indian Springs State Park in Butts County, Georgia. Two granddaughters of Robert Grier, a famous 19th century astronomer and author of the Grier Almanac, built Idlewilde and its gardens. It was operated as a boarding house until 1925. Mr. and Mrs. Willis B. Powell owned the house until 1943 and their guests included Franklin Delano Roosevelt. The property was then owned by Mrs. Linda T. Rastello until 1979 when she sold it to the State of Georgia. It has been used as the administrative offices of the park since March, 1995. It was placed on the National Register of Historic Places in March, 1999. The administrative offices of Indian Springs State Park have been in Idlewilde since March 1995. The park includes waters considered medicinal by Native Americans, giving the park its name, stone buildings and walls built by President Franklin D. Roosevelt's CCC work crews during the Great Depression, and history of the resort hotels of the area from the early 20th Century. The offices are well preserved and include pine floors, beveled glass windows, and a striking staircase.

== See also ==
- National Register of Historic Places listings in Butts County, Georgia
