= Georgia's 122nd House of Representatives district =

State district in Georgia, USA

Georgia's 122nd State House of Representatives district
Representative
Spencer Frye; D–Athens
- Demographics: 74.6% White; 12.1% Black; 5.0% Hispanic; 5.5% Asian
- Population: 62,674

District 122 elects one member of the Georgia House of Representatives. It contains parts of Clarke County.

== Members ==
- Ben Harbin (1994–2015)
- Jodi Lott (2015–2023)
- Spencer Frye (since 2023)
