= Neiron Ball =

American football player (1992–2019)

No. 58
- Position: Linebacker

Personal information
- Born: August 20, 1992; Jackson, Georgia, U.S.
- Died: September 9, 2019 (aged 27); Jackson, Georgia, U.S.
- Listed height: 6 ft 2 in (1.88 m)
- Listed weight: 230 lb (104 kg)

Career information
- High school: Jackson (GA)
- College: Florida
- NFL draft: 2015: 5th round, 161st overall pick

Career history
- Oakland Raiders (2015–2016)

Career NFL statistics
- Total tackles: 9
- Sacks: 1
- Fumble recoveries: 1
- Stats at Pro Football Reference

Neiron Ball (August 20, 1992 – September 9, 2019) was an American professional football linebacker for the Oakland Raiders of the National Football League (NFL). He played college football for the University of Florida and was drafted by the Oakland Raiders in the fifth round of the 2015 NFL draft.

== Early life ==
Ball attended Jackson High School in Jackson, Georgia, where he played football for coach Mike Parris. As a junior, he recorded 104 tackles (35 for loss), 19 sacks and forced seven fumbles. Ball also starred in track & field at Jackson, where he competed as a sprinter (best of 11.19 seconds in the 100-meter dash) and high jumper (PR of 1.73m or 5'8").

Ball was rated a four-star prospect by both Scout.com and Rivals.com. He was viewed as the No. 16 outside linebacker in the country by Scout.com and the No. 19 weak side defensive end by Rivals.com. Ball chose Florida over Alabama, Clemson, Georgia, LSU and South Carolina.

== College career ==
Ball played at Florida from 2011 to 2014.

== Professional career ==
Pre-draft measurables
Height	Weight	Arm length	40-yard dash	10-yard split	20-yard split	20-yard shuttle	Vertical jump	Broad jump	Bench press
6 ft 2 in (1.88 m)	236 lb (107 kg)	32.5 in (0.83 m)	4.65 s	1.62 s	2.66 s	4.26 s	34 1/2 in (0.88 m)	5 ft 78 in (3.51 m)	22 reps
All values from Florida Pro Day

Ball was drafted by the Oakland Raiders in the fifth round of the 2015 NFL draft with the 161st overall pick. On September 27, 2015, Ball got his first career sack against Josh McCown in a 27–20 win against the Cleveland Browns. On December 12, 2015, Ball was placed on injured reserve. On September 3, 2016, Ball was again waived by the Raiders and was placed on injured reserve.

== Death ==
Ball was first diagnosed with arteriovenous malformation in 2011 while playing for Florida, but recovered and was able to play football. In December 2018, he suffered an aneurysm and was placed into a medically-induced coma. Ball died from the condition in Jackson, Georgia on September 9, 2019.
