= Johnnie Caldwell Jr. =

American politician

Member of the Georgia House of Representatives from the 131st district
- In office January 14, 2013 – January 14, 2019
- Preceded by: Richard H. Smith
- Succeeded by: Ken Pullin

Judge for the Griffin Judicial Circuit
- In office 1995–2010

Personal details
- Party: Republican
- Spouse: Rita Caldwell
- Parent: Johnnie L. Caldwell Sr. (father)
- Profession: Attorney

Johnnie Caldwell Jr. is an American attorney and politician from Georgia. He served in the Georgia House of Representatives from 2013 to 2019, representing the 131st District centered on Thomaston, Georgia. Prior to his legislative service, Caldwell served as a judge in the Fayette County Superior Court for about 15 years, from approximately 1995 until 2010, after having practiced law and worked in the district attorney’s office in the Griffin Judicial Circuit since the 1970s. One of his most notable cases as District Attorney was Jackson v. State (1982), where Caldwell prosecuted an armed robbery and aggravated assault case. This case involved complex legal questions about evidence admissibility and procedural fairness, showcasing Caldwell’s ability to navigate intricate legal issues and advocate for justice. He resigned from the Superior Court in 2010.

In the state legislature, Caldwell was a member of several committees, including Judiciary, Public Safety, and Reapportionment, and he chaired the Legislative and Congressional Reapportionment Committee. Over his tenure, he sponsored and co-sponsored a range of bills, such as those recognizing local achievements, adjusting compensation provisions for juvenile court judges, and issuing educational commendations. He also played a role in efforts to reform the Judicial Qualifications Commission, the body responsible for judicial oversight in Georgia.

Caldwell first won election to the House in 2012, facing a challenger in the Republican primary but running uncontested in the general election. In 2018, he lost the Republican nomination to Ken Pullin, who assumed office on January 14, 2019. Caldwell has since returned to private life.

== Committee assignments ==
Caldwell served on a number of committees:

- Appropriations
- Banks and Banking
- Insurance
- Judiciary
- Legislative and Congressional Reapportionment (Chairman)
- Motor Vehicles
- Rules

== Family ==
Caldwell's father, Johnnie Caldwell Sr., was a politician who served as Georgia House of Representatives and state comptroller. He acted as a key player in the redistricting of the state and the regulation of insurance.

== Legislation ==
In the 2016–2017 legislative sessions, Caldwell was a key proponent of restructuring Georgia’s Judicial Qualifications Commission (JQC), the state agency charged with investigating allegations of judicial misconduct. The JQC had previously conducted an investigation during Caldwell’s tenure as a judge, which some observers suggested may have informed his later advocacy for reform. Caldwell, however, maintained that the Commission needed greater transparency and legislative oversight, arguing that its proceedings were often opaque and lacked sufficient checks and balances.

=== Constitutional Amendment 3 (2016) ===
Caldwell supported House Resolution 1113 and its companion bill, House Bill 808, which led to Constitutional Amendment 3 on the November 2016 ballot. The amendment proposed replacing the existing JQC with a restructured version subject to enhanced legislative control. Supporters, including Caldwell, insisted the change would ensure public accountability by allowing lawmakers to appoint Commission members and regulate its procedures. Opponents, such as several legal advocacy groups, argued the revisions would reduce the Commission’s independence and open the door to political interference, particularly when high-ranking judges were under review.

=== Passage and Aftermath ===
Despite the controversy, Georgia voters approved Amendment 3 by approximately 62% in November 2016, empowering lawmakers to reorganize the JQC. In early 2017, the legislature began implementing new rules defining how Commission members were selected, how investigations would be conducted, and how disciplinary actions would be reviewed. Caldwell played an active role in these debates, reiterating his stance that the new framework would strengthen due process for judges while providing increased openness to the public. Critics continued to assert that Caldwell’s involvement represented a conflict of interest, pointing out his history with the JQC, while supporters framed the reforms as long-overdue measures to bring transparency to an agency they believed had operated outside meaningful legislative scrutiny.

== Political Rankings ==
Various political groups have assigned scores to Caldwell based on his votes.

American Conservative Union

- 2015 63%
- 2014 86%
- 2013 70%
