= WKKP =

Radio station in McDonough, Georgia

- McDonough, Georgia; United States
- Broadcast area: Henry County, Georgia
- Frequency: 1410 kHz
- Branding: Classic Country 100.9 and 1410 AM

Programming
- Language: English
- Format: Classic Country

Ownership
- Owner: Henry County Radio, Inc.
- Sister stations: WJGA-FM

History
- First air date: April 24, 1967
- Former call signs: WJGA (1967–1979); WZAL (1979–1992)
- Former frequencies: 1540 kHz

Technical information
- Licensing authority: FCC
- Facility ID: 26940
- Class: D
- Power: 2,500 watts day 58 watts night 250 Watts FM Translator
- Transmitter coordinates: 33°25′47.00″N 84°07′52.00″W
- Translator: W265DG 100.9 MHz

Links
- Public license information: Public file; LMS

WKKP (“Classic Country 100.9 FM and 1410 AM”) broadcasts on 1410 kHz at a power of 2,500 watts daytime and 58 watts at night from a tower located on Racetrack Road in McDonough, Georgia, a southern suburb of Atlanta. The station is owned by Henry County Radio Co, Inc. and originates from studios located on Brownlee Road in Jackson, Georgia. The FM translator broadcasts at a frequency of 100.9 MHz with a power of 250 watts from the tower located on Racetrack Rd.

== History ==
The station callsign was originally WJGA and was assigned to a frequency of 1540 kHz and located in Jackson, Georgia. The station was sold and moved to McDonough, the calls changed to WZAL, assigned to 1540 kHz, and owned by Dallas Tarkenton (older brother of Fran Tarkenton). Broadcasting as WZAL continued until it was purchased by DeVan-Moore Communication, Inc. in 1980. The station saw successful growth in the hands of Jim DeVan, former manager of WMCD (Statesboro, Georgia), and moved to 1410 kHz in the late 1980s.

Jim DeVan managed WZAL until his sudden death from a work-related accident in 1991. The station was sold to a former Tarkenton associate (Earnhart), who changed the call letters and moved the studios to Jackson several years later, but left the transmitter in McDonough. WKKP (Kopy Kat Programming) aired local programming in the morning, followed by simulcast programming from sister station WJGA-FM in Jackson, Georgia.

The station has gone through many format changes, and currently broadcasts Classic Country programming from satellite. WKKP also broadcasts AP network news at the top of the hour. The Henry County Schools high school football game of the week is also aired Friday night and they also broadcast high school baseball and basketball games in season, with Rob Gulley providing play by play.
