= WJGA-FM =

- Jackson, Georgia; United States
- Broadcast area: South Metro Atlanta
- Frequency: 92.1 MHz
- Branding: 92FM

Programming
- Format: Classic hits

Ownership
- Owner: Earnhart Broadcasting, Inc.
- Sister stations: WKKP

History
- First air date: April 24, 1967
- Call sign meaning: Jackson, GeorgiA

Technical information
- Licensing authority: FCC
- Facility ID: 18179
- Class: A
- ERP: 5,500 watts
- HAAT: 105 meters
- Transmitter coordinates: 33°16′37.00″N 83°57′59.00″W

Links
- Public license information: Public file; LMS
- Website: wjga921.com

WJGA-FM (92.1 FM) broadcasts from Jackson, Georgia, on 92.1 MHz from a 325 feet above ground level tower at 5,500 watts ERP. WJGA-FM is owned by Earnhart Broadcasting Co., Inc.

== Programming ==
WJGA-FM broadcasts a wide range of entertainment including oldies, current hits, R&B, and gospel. WJGA has a large assortment of local oriented broadcasts including Jackson High School sporting events, Local community events, and local originating news programming. Besides covering the local Butts County, Georgia, area it covers most of the southeast metro Atlanta area south to Macon, west to Thomaston, and east to Eatonton.For the past five Christmases, the station has simulcasted classic country music from its sister station WKKP 1410 AM in McDonough, Georgia for the holidays.

== On-air personalities ==
- Don Earnhart
- Susanne Earnhart
- Todd Wilson
- Robert Gulley
- Chad Sheppard
- Sonny Weaver
