= John Lunsford =

American politician and businessman from Georgia

Member of the Georgia House of Representatives from the 110th district
- In office January 2005 – December 2010
- Succeeded by: Andrew Welch

Personal details
- Spouse: Tina Lunsford
- Children: 7
- Occupation: Businessman, politician

John Lunsford (born November 14, 1957) is an American politician and businessman from Georgia. Lunsford is a former Republican member of Georgia House of Representatives.

== Early life ==
On November 14, 1957, Lunsford was born in Pinebluff, Arkansas.

== Education ==
Lunsford attended Carver Bible College and Clayton State College.

== Career ==
In 1975, Lunsford became the Vice President of Allied Building Services, until 1978. In 1978, Lunsford became the Executive Vice President/Equity Owner of Professional Carpet Systems, Incorporated, until 1986. In 1986, Lunsford became the President and chief executive officer of Harvard Chemical Research Corporation, until 1998. In 1997, Lunsford became the President of Henry County Janitorial Supply LLC.

On November 2, 2004, Lunsford won the election and became a Republican member of Georgia House of Representatives for District 110. Lunsford defeated Jerry Williams with 73.23% of the votes. On November 7, 2006, as an incumbent, Lunsford won the election unopposed and continued serving District 110. On November 4, 2008, as an incumbent, Lunsford won the election unopposed and continued serving District 110.

Lunsford served in the Georgia House of Representatives. He opted not to seek reelection to the Georgia House in 2010.

== Awards ==
- 2008 Legislative Service Award. Presented by the Association of County Commissioners of Georgia.

== Personal life ==
Lunsford's wife is Tina Lunsford. They have seven children. Lunsford and his family lives in McDonough, Georgia.

== See also ==
- Clint Crowe
