= Treaty of Indian Springs (1821) =

1821 treaty between the Muscogee and United States

The Treaty of Indian Springs, also known as the First Treaty of Indian Springs and the Treaty with the Creeks, is a treaty concluded between the Muscogee and the United States on January 8, 1821, at what is now Indian Springs State Park.

== Background ==
The Muscogee were a divided people. Beginning in earnest under the administration of American Indian agent Benjamin Hawkins in the late eighteenth and early nineteenth century, the Muscogee, especially the Lower Creek, adopted European agriculture and Western culture. A reaction against these changes was fanned by the arrival among the Muscogee of the Shawnee chief Tecumseh and the omens of the Great Comet of 1811 and the 1811–12 New Madrid earthquakes. The traditionalists came to be known as Red Sticks. In February 1813, a band of Red Sticks returning from Detroit, where they served alongside the United Kingdom and Tecumseh's Confederacy in the Siege of Detroit, killed two families of American settlers along the Duck River near Nashville, Tennessee. Hawkins demanded that the Muscogee turn over the murderers. Instead the chiefs executed them, sparking a civil war, the Creek War, between the Red Sticks and the predominantly Lower Creek pro-American Muscogee. The Red Sticks were crushed in the decisive Battle of Horseshoe Bend of March 27, 1814 by a coalition including American, Choctaw and Cherokee forces.

After the war, William McIntosh, the military leader of the Lower Creek, a half-white member of the prestigious Wind Clan, established a police force and organized a National Creek Council.

The state of Georgia, which initiated the treaty talks in December 1820, had two main goals. First, it hoped for the cession of Muscogee land contiguous with Cherokee territory, in order to split the tribes and prevent a military alliance. Second, Georgian citizens had some $350,000 in outstanding claims against the Muscogee for seizure or destruction of property prior to the passage of the Nonintercourse Act of 1802.

The federal government of the United States, following its incipient policy of Indian removal, had the goal of exchanging land west of the Mississippi River for Muscogee lands in Georgia.

== The treaty ==
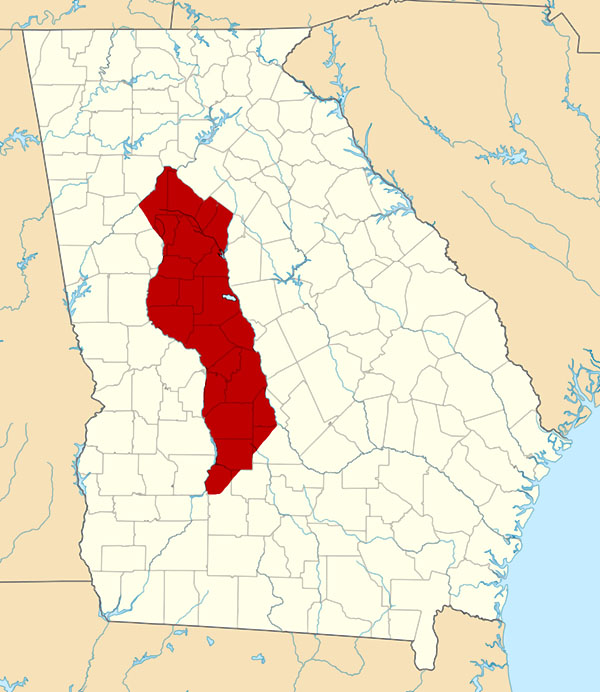
Muscogee cessions under the treaty

Under the terms of the treaty, the Muscogee ceded their territory east of the Flint River, some 4,000,000 acres (16,187 km2) to Georgia. In exchange, the United States government agreed to pay the Muscogee some $200,000 over fourteen years, including a first installment of $50,000, and to pay Georgian citizens' claims against them. It also paid McIntosh $40,000 directly and granted him 1,000 acres (400 ha) of land at Indian Springs. McIntosh built a hotel, now the Indian Springs Hotel Museum, on the land.

== Aftermath ==
The Creek National Council swore not to cede any additional land to the United States, decreeing a sentence of death for violation of that pledge. Nevertheless, just such a cession would be made in the Second Treaty of Indian Springs.
