= Clint Crowe =

American politician

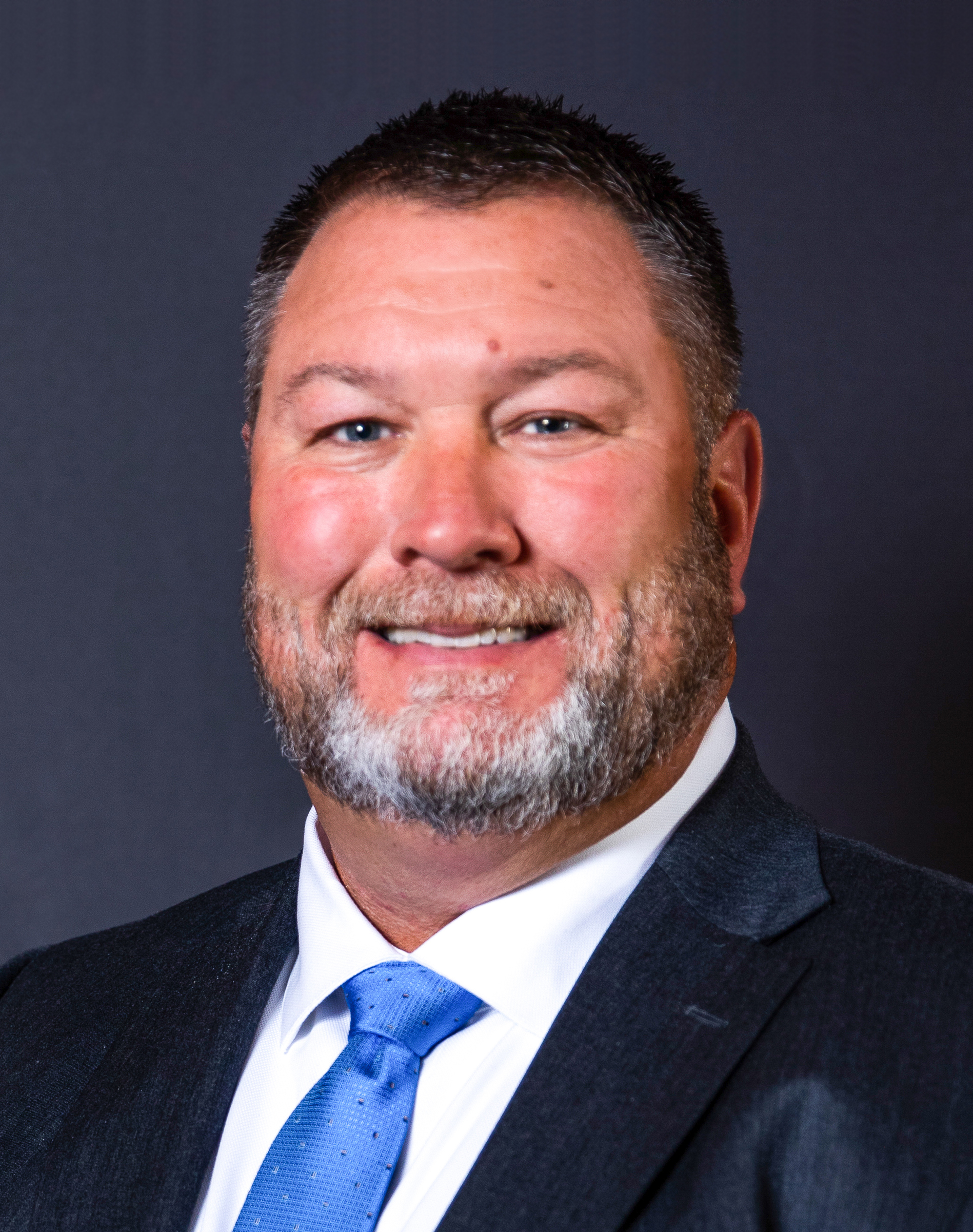
- Official headshot

Member of the Georgia House of Representatives
- Incumbent
- Assumed office January 11, 2021
- Preceded by: Andrew Welch
- Constituency: 110th District (2021–2023); 118th District (2023–present)

Personal details
- Born: Clinton Thomas Crowe; June 12, 1973 (age 53)
- Party: Republican
- Spouse: Kristie Crowe
- Education: Mercer University (B.B.A., M.B.A.)
- Occupation: Realtor, Politician

Clinton Thomas Crowe (born June 12, 1973) is an American politician from Georgia. Crowe is a Republican member of the Georgia House of Representatives for District 118, which covers Butts County as well as portions of Monroe County and Newton County. Prior to the 2023 redistricting, he represented portions of Butts County, Newton County, and Henry County in the 110th District.

== Personal life ==
Crowe's wife is Kristie Crowe. They have four children. Crowe and his family live in Jackson Lake, Georgia.

Georgia House of Representatives
Preceded by Andrew Welch	Member of the Georgia House of Representatives from the 110th district 2021–2023	Succeeded by Segun Adeyina
Preceded by Spencer Frye	Member of the Georgia House of Representatives from the 118th district 2023–Present	Incumbent
