= Georgia's 110th House of Representatives district =

State district in Georgia, USA

Georgia's 110th State House of Representatives district
Representative
Segun Adeyina; D–Grayson
- Demographics: 54.5% White; 35.5% Black; 3.3% Hispanic; 0.9% Asian
- Population: 57,082

District 110 elects one member of the Georgia House of Representatives. Since 2023, the district contains parts of Gwinnett County.

== Geography ==
Prior to the 2023 redistricting, the district contained parts of Butts County, Newton County, and Henry County.

== Members ==
- John Lunsford (2005–2010)
- Andrew Welch (2011–2021)
- Clint Crowe (2021–2023)
- Segun Adeyina (since 2023)
