= Jodi Lott =

American politician from Georgia (born 1971)

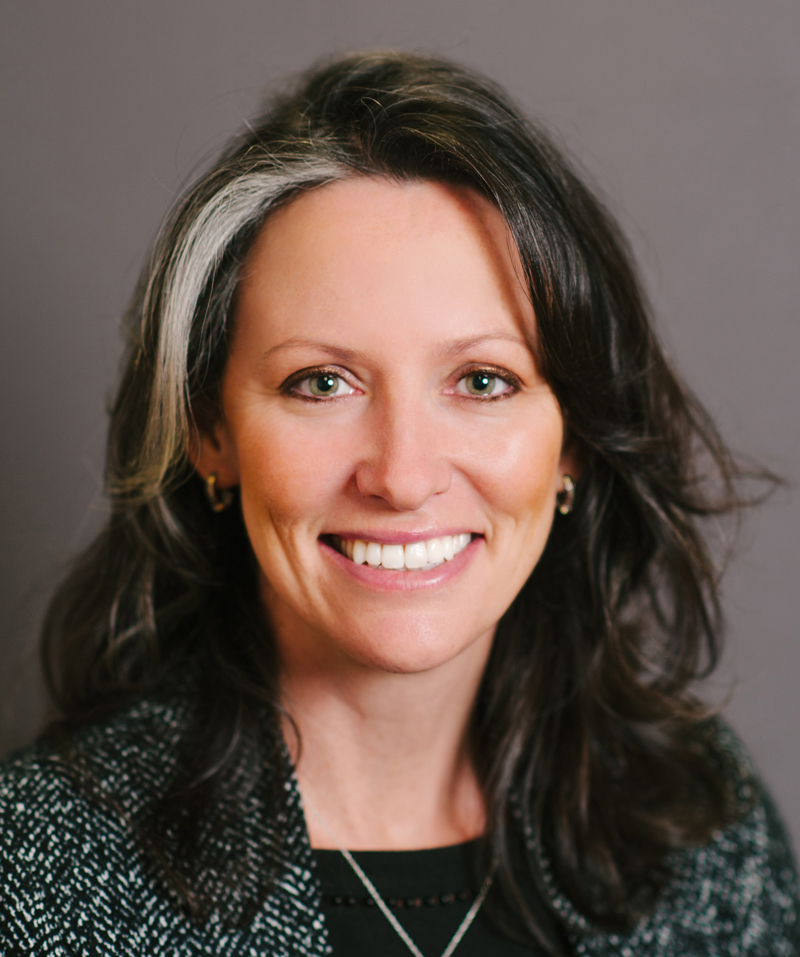

Member of the Georgia House of Representatives
- In office December 14, 2015 – January 13, 2025
- Preceded by: Ben Harbin
- Succeeded by: Rob Clifton
- Constituency: 122nd District (2015–2023); 131st District (2023–2025)

Personal details
- Born: March 27, 1971 (age 55) Maine
- Party: Republican

Jodi Lott (born March 27, 1971) is an American politician who served in the Georgia House of Representatives from the 122nd district from 2015 to 2025.

Lott was tapped by Governor Brian Kemp in 2021 to serve as one of his four floor leaders in the Georgia House of Representatives during the 2021–2022 term of the General Assembly.

Georgia House of Representatives
Preceded by Ben Harbin	Member of the Georgia House of Representatives from the 122nd district 2015–2023	Succeeded by Spencer Frye
Preceded by Beth Camp	Member of the Georgia House of Representatives from the 131st district 2023–2025	Incumbent
