= J. R. Carmichael House =

Historic house in Georgia, United States

- U.S. National Register of Historic Places
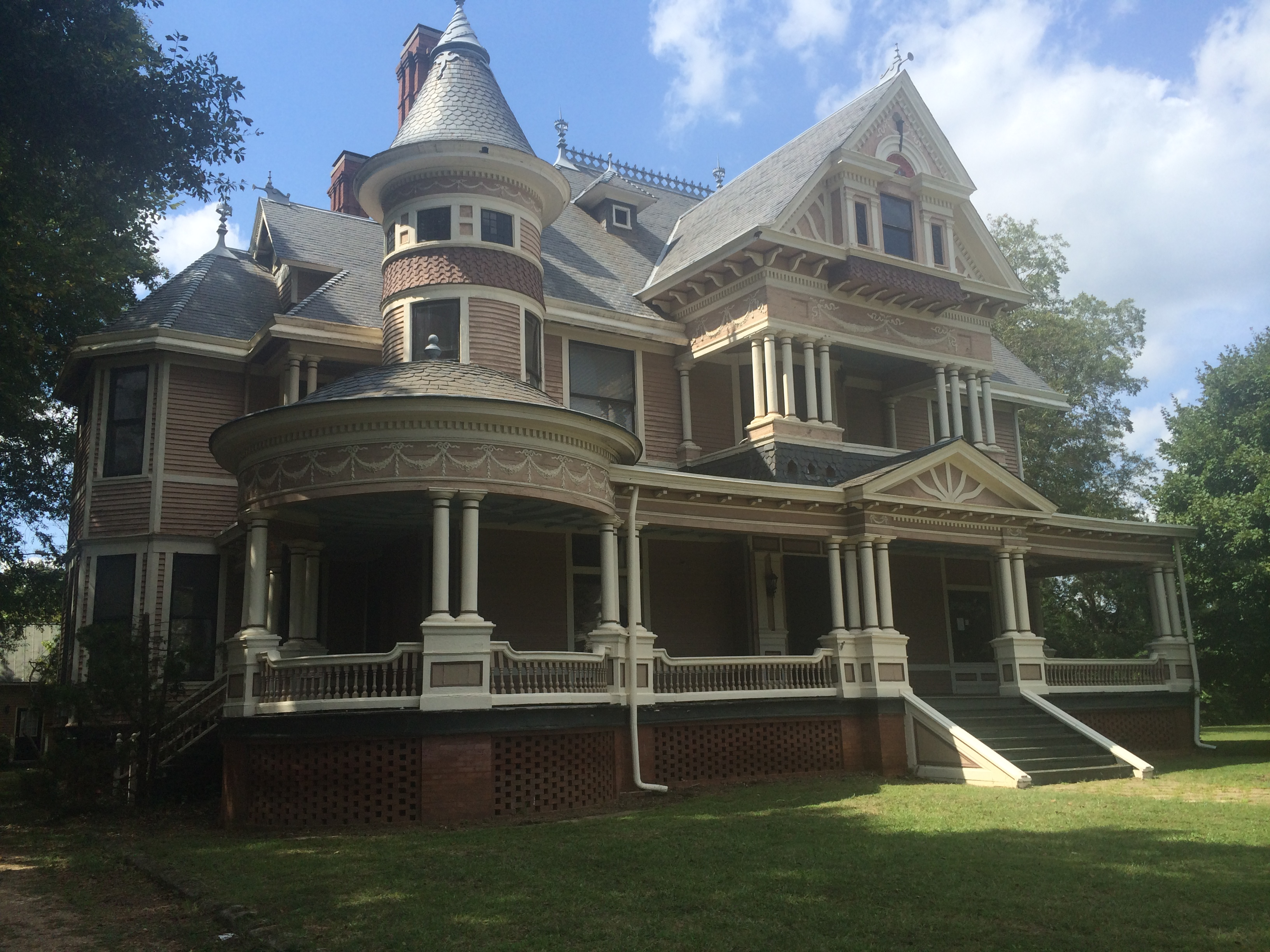

- Location within Georgia
- Location: 149 McDonough Rd., Jackson, Georgia
- Coordinates: 33°17′42″N 83°58′15″W
- Area: 1.3 acres (0.53 ha)
- Built: 1897
- Architect: Bruce & Morgan
- Architectural style: Queen Anne
- NRHP reference No.: 77000411
- Added to NRHP: July 13, 1977

The J. R. Carmichael House, also known as The Carmichael House, is a historic residence in Jackson, Georgia. It was built in 1898 and added to the National Register of Historic Places in 1977. It is located at 149 McDonough Road.

It was designed by Atlanta architects Bruce & Morgan. Its NRHP nomination describes it as "a marvelous assemblage of forms perhaps best described as the Queen Anne Victorian style." It has an asymmetric front facade, and has turrets, dormers, and decorated chimneys.

== See also ==
- National Register of Historic Places listings in Butts County, Georgia
