= René D. Kemp =

American politician

Member of the Georgia House of Representatives from the 139th district
- In office 1977–1983
- Succeeded by: James C. Moore

Member of the Georgia State Senate from the 3rd district
- In office 1993–2004
- Succeeded by: Jeff Chapman

Personal details
- Born: July 15, 1935
- Died: February 4, 2006 (aged 70) Savannah, Georgia, U.S.
- Party: Democratic
- Children: 1
- Education: University of Georgia

René D. Kemp (July 15, 1935 – February 4, 2006) was an American politician. He served as a Democratic member for the 139th district of the Georgia House of Representatives. He also served as a member for the 3rd district of the Georgia State Senate.

== Life and career ==
Kemp attended the University of Georgia.

In 1977, Kemp was elected to the 139th district of the Georgia House of Representatives. He served until 1983, when he was succeeded by James C. Moore. In 1993, Kemp was elected to the 3rd district of the Georgia State Senate, serving until 2004, when he was succeeded by Jeff Chapman.

Kemp died in February 2006 in Savannah, Georgia, at the age of 70.
