= Georgia's 118th House of Representatives district =

State district in Georgia, USA

Georgia's 118th State House of Representatives district
Representative
Clint Crowe; R–Jackson
- Demographics: 45.1% White; 37.0% Black; 13.9% Hispanic; 2.1% Asian
- Population: 57,245

District 118 elects one member of the Georgia House of Representatives. It contains the entirety of Butts County parts of Monroe County and Newton County.

== Members ==
- Keith Heard (until 2013)
- Spencer Frye (2013–2023)
- Clint Crowe (since 2023)
