= Georgia's 131st House of Representatives district =

State district in Georgia, USA

Georgia's 131st State House of Representatives district
Representative
Rob Clifton; R–Evans
- Demographics: 71.5% White; 24.6% Black; 1.8% Hispanic; 0.7% Asian
- Population: 52,272

District 131 elects one member of the Georgia House of Representatives. It contains parts of Columbia County.

== Members ==
- Richard H. Smith (2005–2013)
- Johnnie Caldwell Jr. (2013–2019)
- Ken Pullin (2019–2021)
- Beth Camp (2021–2023)
- Jodi Lott (2023–2025)
- Rob Clifton (since 2025)
