= Georgia's 135th House of Representatives district =

State district in Georgia, USA

Georgia's 135th State House of Representatives district
Representative
| Beth Camp; R–Concord |
- Demographics: 31.8% White; 54.5% Black; 7.0% Hispanic; 1.0% Asian
- Population: 52,848

District 135 elects one member of the Georgia House of Representatives. It contains the entirety of Pike County as well as parts of Lamar County and Spalding County.

== Members ==
- Calvin Smyre (2013–2023)
- Beth Camp (since 2023)
