= Rob Clifton =

American politician

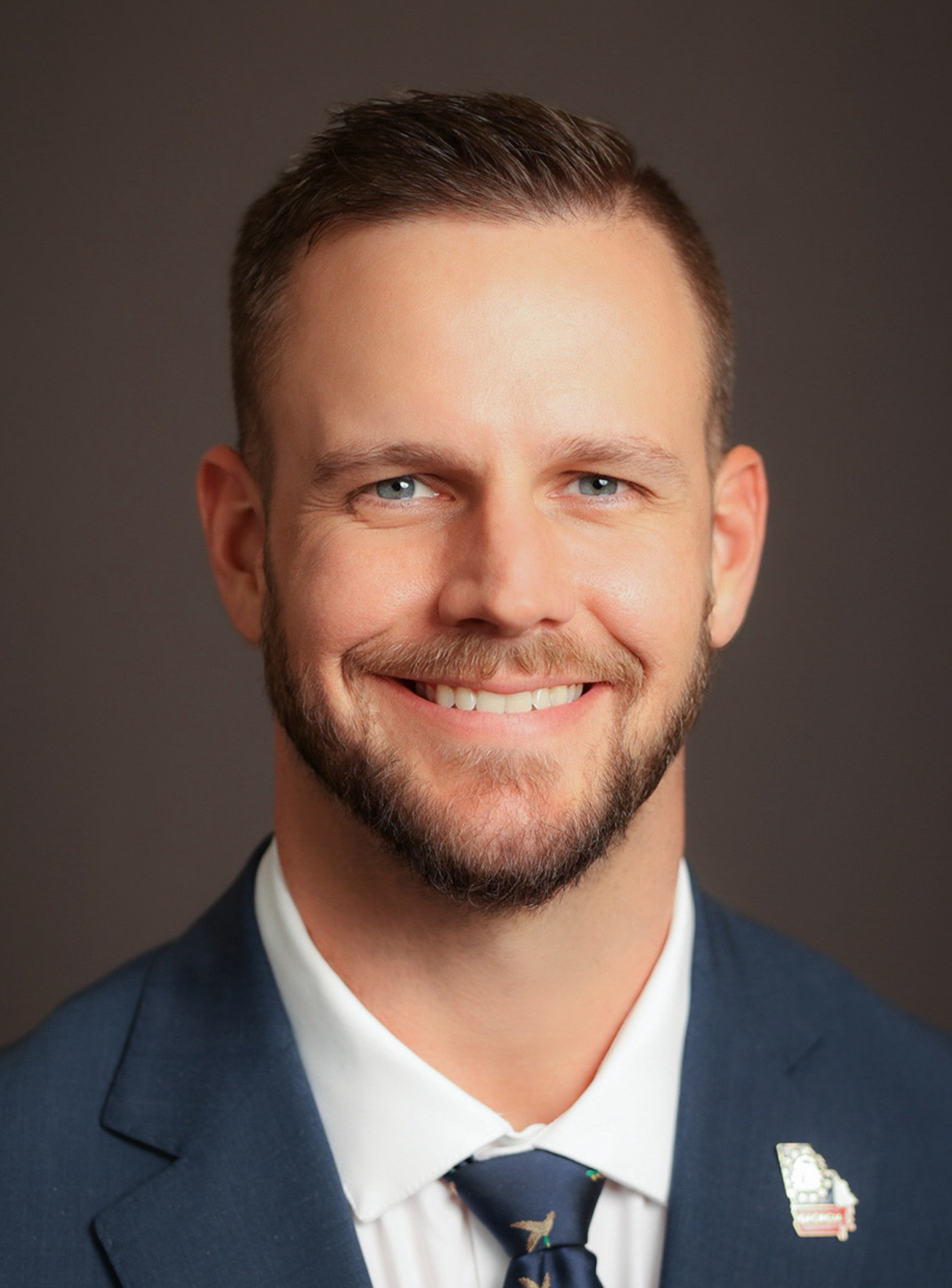

Member of the Georgia House of Representatives from the 131st district
- Incumbent
- Assumed office January 13, 2025
- Preceded by: Jodi Lott

Personal details
- Born: 23 October Augusta, Georgia, U.S.
- Party: Republican
- Spouse: Lauren Clifton
- Children: 2
- Education: Auburn University
- Website: https://www.legis.ga.gov/members/house/5080?session=1033

Robert Solomon Clifton is an American politician and businessman who has been a member of the Georgia House of Representatives for the 131st district since January 13, 2025. This district comprises a portion of Columbia County, Georgia, and the City of Evans. The district has a population of around 61,000 people.

Clifton currently serves on the Economic Development and Tourism, Interstate Cooperation and Transportation committees.

== Elections ==
=== 2024 ===
On November 5, 2024, Clifton defeated Democrat opponent Heather White in District 131 at the 2024 Georgia House of Representatives election.

General election for Georgia House of Representatives District 131, 2024
| Party | Candidate | Votes | % | ±% |
|---|---|---|---|---|
| Republican | Rob Clifton | 21,351 | 65.1% | N/A |
| Democratic | Heather White | 11,466 | 34.9% | +34.9 |
| Total votes | | 32,817 | 100.0% | |

Clifton defeated fellow Republican Paul Abbott in the June 18, 2024 runoff election after no candidate secured a majority in the primary election.

Republican primary runoff for Georgia House of Representatives District 131, 2024
| Party | Candidate | Votes | % | ±% |
|---|---|---|---|---|
| Republican | Rob Clifton | 1,561 | 73.3% | +24.5 |
| Republican | Paul Abbott | 569 | 26.7% | +7.9 |
| Total votes | | 2,130 | 100.0% | |

Republican primary for Georgia House of Representatives District 131, 2024
| Party | Candidate | Votes | % | ±% |
|---|---|---|---|---|
| Republican | Rob Clifton | 1,887 | 48.8% | N/A |
| Republican | Paul Abbott | 728 | 18.8% | N/A |
| Republican | Russell Wilder | 674 | 17.4% | N/A |
| Republican | Benjamin Cairns | 333 | 8.6% | N/A |
| Republican | David Byrne | 247 | 6.4% | N/A |
| Total votes | | 3,869 | 100.0% | |

== Legislative positions and appointments ==
House Majority Whip James Burchett appointed Clifton to the 2025–26 Majority Whip Team. This group of Republican legislators educates and coordinates legislators of their party to advance key initiatives within the House of Representatives. He also sits on the House Study Committee on Affordability & Accessibility of Georgia’s Legitimation Process, which investigates methods to ensure Georgia's legitimation process is open to all.

== Political beliefs ==
Clifton maintains conservative political beliefs, and wants to "represent [the District] and the conservatives of Columbia County." He stated he wants to "hold true to what [his] county is" and avoid liberalization as Columbia County urbanizes.

=== Abortion ===
Clifton is "pro-life". On an April 1, 2024 candidate survey conducted by Georgia Life Alliance, Clifton stated abortion should be illegal in all instances. He supports the Supreme Court's decision in Dobbs v. Jackson Women's Health Organization (2022) and Georgia's "Heartbeat Bill".

=== Immigration ===
Clifton is a member of the Pro-Enforcement Immigration Caucus, a legislative caucus "dedicated to strengthening immigration enforcement and ensuring the rule of law is upheld throughout Georgia" The Caucus supports increased cooperation and information-sharing with federal immigration agencies, like United States Immigration and Customs Enforcement (ICE).

=== Law enforcement ===
On February 6, 2025, Clifton sponsored HB 309, which would require county governments to receive majority public support in a ballot referendum before a county police force may be abolished.

== Personal life ==
Clifton is a father of two, and is the CEO of SD Clifton Construction.

Clifton is a member of the Journey Community Church.
