= Johnnie L. Caldwell =

American politician and attorney (1922–2014)

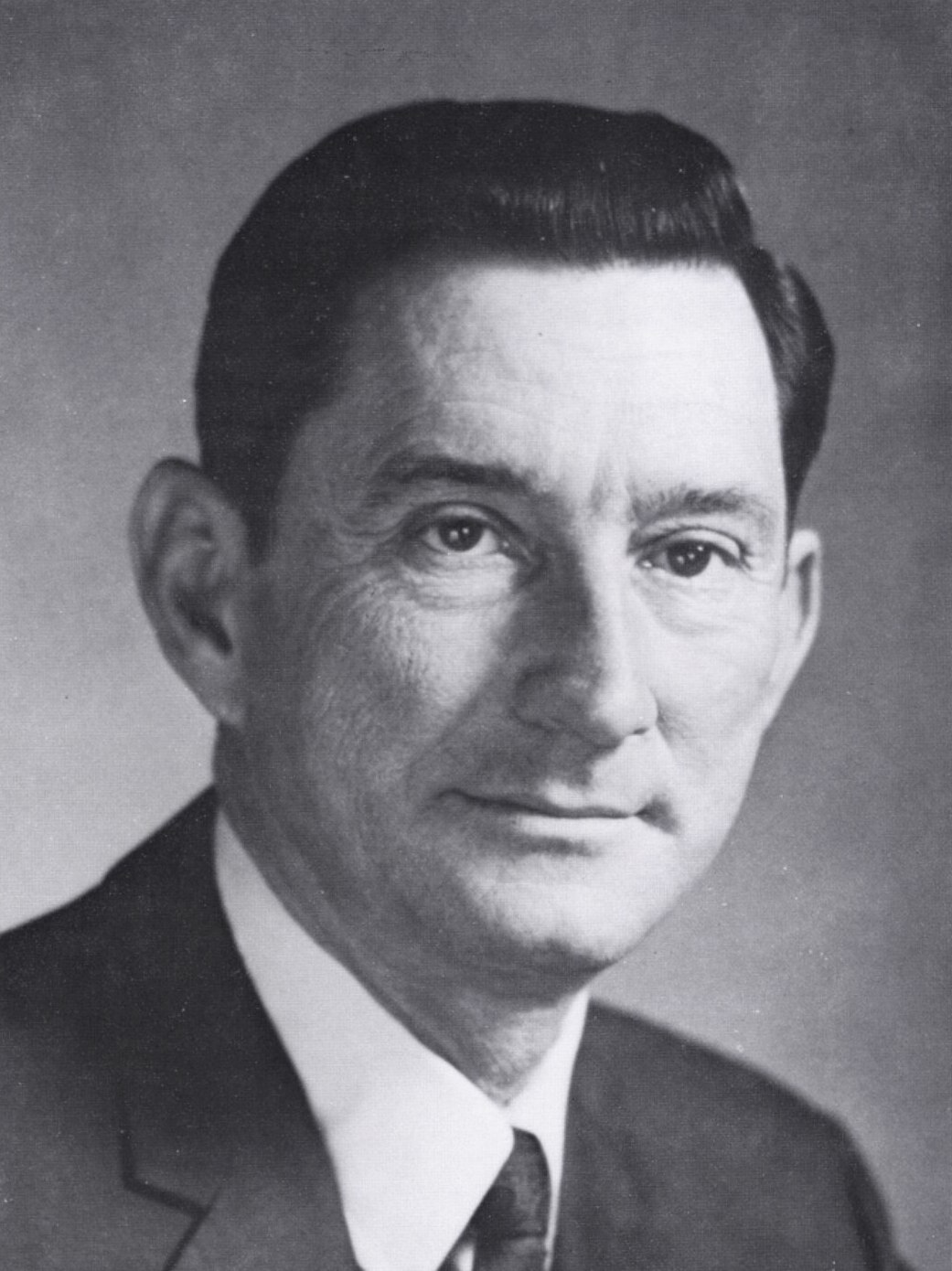
- Official portrait, 1970s

Georgia State Comptroller/Commissioner of Insurance
- In office 1971–1985
- Governor: Jimmy Carter; George Busbee; Joe Frank Harris
- Preceded by: James L. Bentley
- Succeeded by: Warren D. Evans

Member of the Georgia House of Representatives
- In office 1955–1970

Personal details
- Born: August 10, 1922 Taylor County, Georgia, U.S.
- Died: December 15, 2014 (aged 92)
- Party: Democratic
- Spouse: Mary Lou Smisson
- Children: 3 (including Johnnie Jr.)
- Education: Woodrow Wilson Law College
- Profession: attorney

Military service
- Allegiance: United States
- Branch/service: Army
- Years of service: 1943–44
- Battles/wars: World War II; Battle of Normandy; Battle of the Bulge; Battle of Berlin

Johnnie L. Caldwell (August 10, 1922 – December 15, 2014) was an American politician and attorney who served as a member of the Georgia House of Representatives from 1955 to 1970 and as Georgia state comptroller/insurance commissioner from 1971 to 1985.

== Early life and career ==
Caldwell was born in Taylor County, Georgia on August 10, 1922, the son of Johnnie William Caldwell and Mattie Stalnaker Caldwell.

During World War II, Caldwell served in the United States Army. Serving from 1943 into 1945, Caldwell was a member of the 3rd Field Artillery Regiment during the Battle of Normandy, Battle of the Bulge, and the Capture of Berlin.

He graduated from Woodrow Wilson Law College in 1955 and worked as a lawyer.

== Georgia House of Representatives (1955–1971) ==
Caldwell served as a Democratic Party member of the Georgia House of Representatives from 1955 to 1970. During his tenure in the state house, Caldwell was the assistant floor leader for two governors, and was chairman of the Reapportionment Committee which oversaw the redistricting of the state's U.S. congressional and state legislative districts.

== Comptroller General/Commissioner of Insurance (1971–1985) ==
In 1970, Caldwell was elected to the statewide position of comptroller general. He took office in 1971. He served four terms, leaving office in 1985. In 1983 (while he was in office) the constitution was amended to retitle of office of "comptroller general" to "commissioner of insurance". He was also an ex-officio member of numerous state boards.

In the office of comptroller/commissioner of insurance, he had duties as the state insurance commissioner (supervising the state insurance department) state fire marshal (overseeing the State Fire Marshal's Office), as well as head of the Georgia Industrial Loan Department and the Georgia Comptroller General's Office. In his first term, he played a significant role in reforming the state's insurance system. While in this office, Caldwell served two terms as president of the National Association of Insurance Commissioners.

After Caldwell retired from office early in 1985, Warren D. Evans was appointed to fill the remainder of his fourth term (which continued until January 1, 1987).

== Personal life and death ==
Caldwell married Martha Lou Smisson, with whom he had three children, including Johnnie Caldwell Jr.

Caldwell died on December 15, 2014, at the age of 92.

Caldwell was a Baptist. He belonged to Freemason and Shriners organizations.
