= Carmen Rice =

American politician (born 1974)

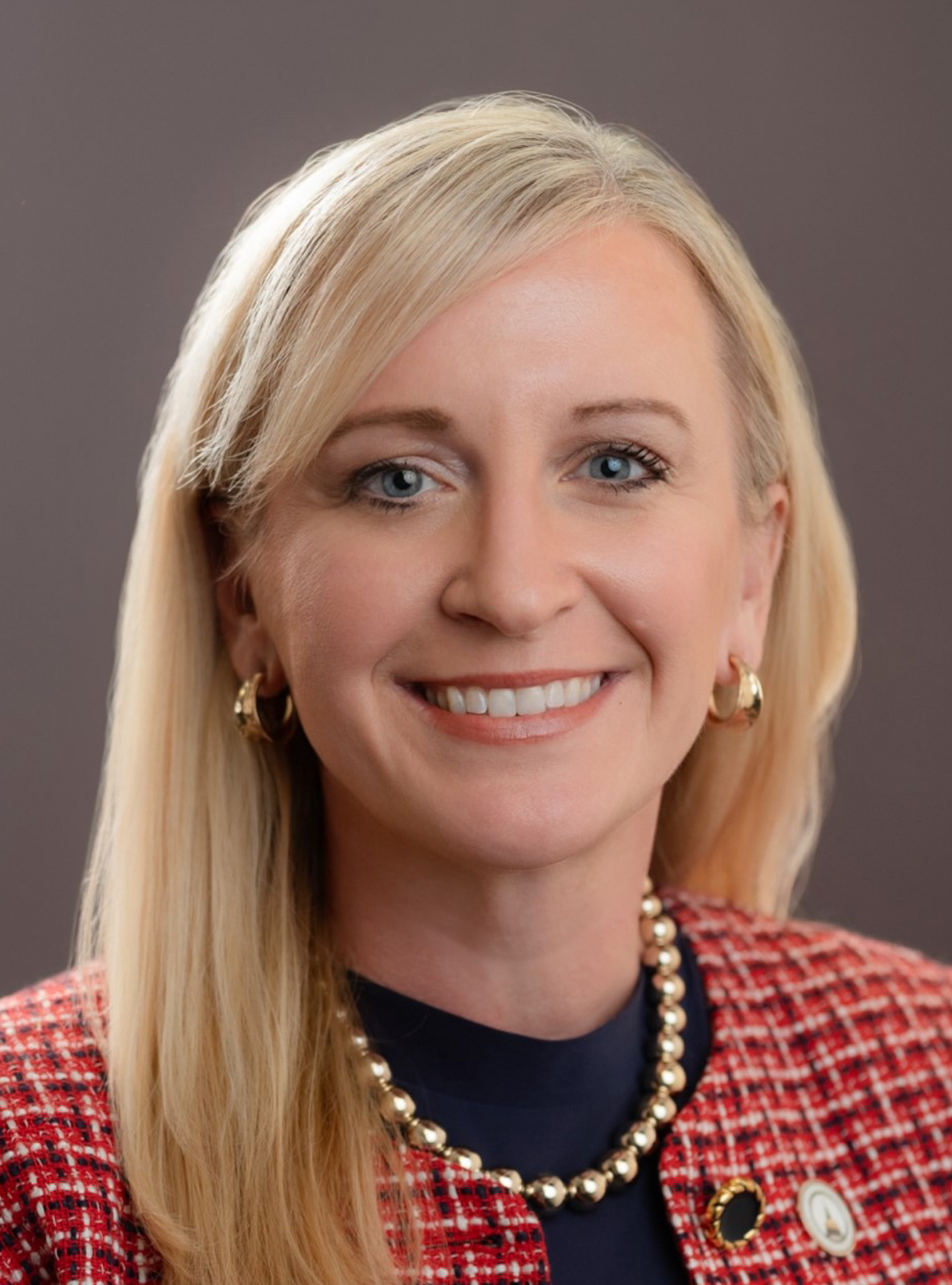
- Official headshot

Member of the Georgia House of Representatives from the 139th district
- Incumbent
- Assumed office May 15, 2024
- Preceded by: Richard H. Smith

Personal details
- Born: October 16, 1974 (age 51)
- Party: Republican
- Spouse: Steven Rice
- Children: 4

Carmen Rice (born October 16, 1974) is an American politician. She is a member of the Georgia House of Representatives from the 139th district, serving since 2024. She is a member of the Republican Party.

== Political career ==
Prior to being elected to the Georgia House of Representatives, Rice was the first chairwoman of the Muscogee County Republican Party. After the death of Rep. Richard Smith, Rice defeated fellow Republican challenger Sean Knox in a special election runoff, winning 55% of the vote.

Rice co-sponsored the Distraction Free Education Act, a law that limits the use and possession of phones by students in public schools.
