= Lambda Pi Eta =

American collegiate honor society for communications

- ΛΠΗ
- Founded: 1985; 41 years ago University of Arkansas
- Type: Honor
- Affiliation: ACHS
- Status: Active
- Emphasis: Communications
- Scope: National
- Colors: Crimson and Silver
- Publication: LPH Journal; Ceased publication in 2015
- Chapters: 500+
- Members: 26,000+ lifetime
- Headquarters: 1765 N Street, NW; Washington, D.C. 20036; United States
- Website: www.natcom.org/student-organizations/lambda-pi-eta

Lambda Pi Eta (ΛΠΗ) is an international communication studies honor society, associated with the National Communication Association (NCA). Lambda Pi Eta was established in 1984 at the University of Arkansas and has more than 500 active chapter. It is an Association of College Honor Societies member.

== History ==
Lambda Pi Eta was founded in 1985 at the University of Arkansas. Its founder was student Lori Beth Young (Griggs), with the assistance of communications study professor Steve Smith. Its purpose was to recognize scholastic achievement in communications studies and to promote and encourage academic conversations between students and faculty.

Around 24 students were recruited or tapped for the first induction ceremony. Young served as the Alpha chapter's first president, with Smith as the society's advisor.

Lambda Pi Eta became a part of the National Communication Association in 1988, and the official honor society of the NCA in July 1995. Lamba Pi Eta joined the Association of College Honor Societies in 1996.

In its first 25 years, the society initiated 22,000 members. In 2012, it had 521 active chapters, 521 active members, and 26,215 total initiates. In 2012, it began offering membership to graduate students.

Its national headquarters is at 1765 N Street NW in Washington, D.C.

== Symbols ==
The name Lambda Pi Eta represents Aristotle's three types of proofs of persuasion: Logos (Lambda) meaning logic, Pathos (Pi) relating to emotion, and Ethos (Eta) defined as character credibility and ethics.

The induction ceremony including lighting three candles, representing the Greek letters Lambda, Pi, and Eta.

The society's colors are crimson and silver. Its publication was LPH Journal, which ceased published in 2015. Its newsletter is Simply Speaking.

== Member requirements ==
In order to become a member of Lambda Pi Eta, communications students must rank in the top 35 percent of their class, with a 3.0 cumulative GPA after completing sixty semester hours.

== Chapter list ==
Lambda Pi Eta has more than 500 active chapters in the United States.

== Notable members ==
- Beth Camp, Georgia House of Representatives

== See also ==
- Honor cords
- Professional fraternities and sororities
