= Butts County School District =

School district in Georgia (U.S. state)

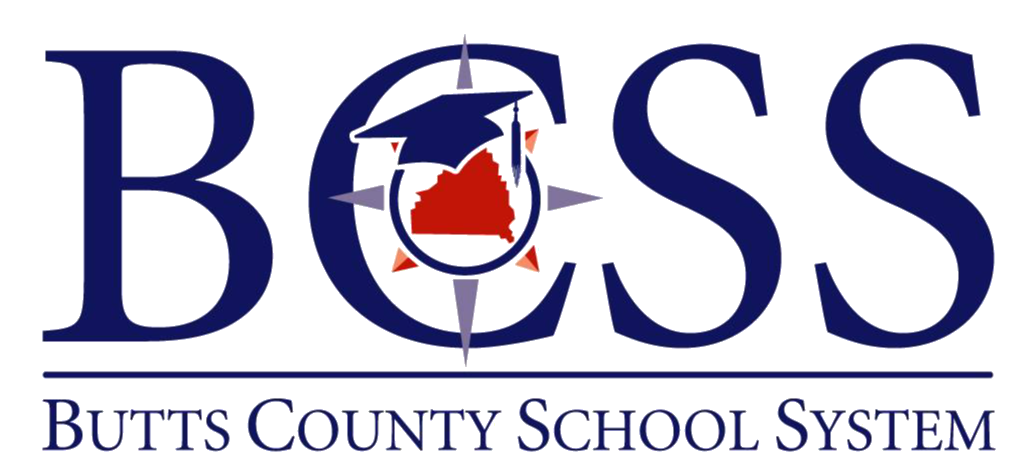

Address
- 181 North Mulberry Street Jackson, Georgia, 30233; United States
- Coordinates: 33.295889°N 83.966622°W

District information
- Grades: Pre-kindergarten – 12
- Superintendent: Charles "Brent" Lowe

Students and staff
- Enrollment: 3,564 (2022–23)
- Faculty: 234.30 (FTE)

Other information
- Accreditation: Southern Association of Colleges and Schools; Georgia Accrediting Commission
- Phone: (770) 504-2300
- Fax: (770) 504-2305
- Website: bcssk12.org

The Butts County School District is a public school district in Butts County, Georgia, United States, based in Jackson, Georgia. It serves the communities of Flovilla, Jackson, and Jenkinsburg, Georgia.

== Schools ==
The Butts County School District has three elementary schools, one middle school, and one high school.

=== Elementary schools ===
- Hampton L. Daughtry Elementary School
- Jackson Elementary School
- Stark Elementary School

=== Middle school ===
- Henderson Middle School

=== High school ===
- Jackson High School
