= Andrew Welch (politician) =

American politician

Andy Welch

Member of the Georgia House of Representatives from the 110th district
- In office January 11, 2011 – January 11, 2021
- Preceded by: John Lunsford
- Succeeded by: Clint Crowe

Personal details
- Born: March 3, 1972 (age 54) Atlanta, Georgia, U.S.
- Party: Republican
- Spouse: Cara
- Children: 3

Andrew Jackson Welch III (born March 3, 1972) is an American politician from Georgia. Welch is a former Republican member of the Georgia House of Representatives who represented the 110th district from 2011 to 2021.
