= Spencer Frye =

American politician from Georgia

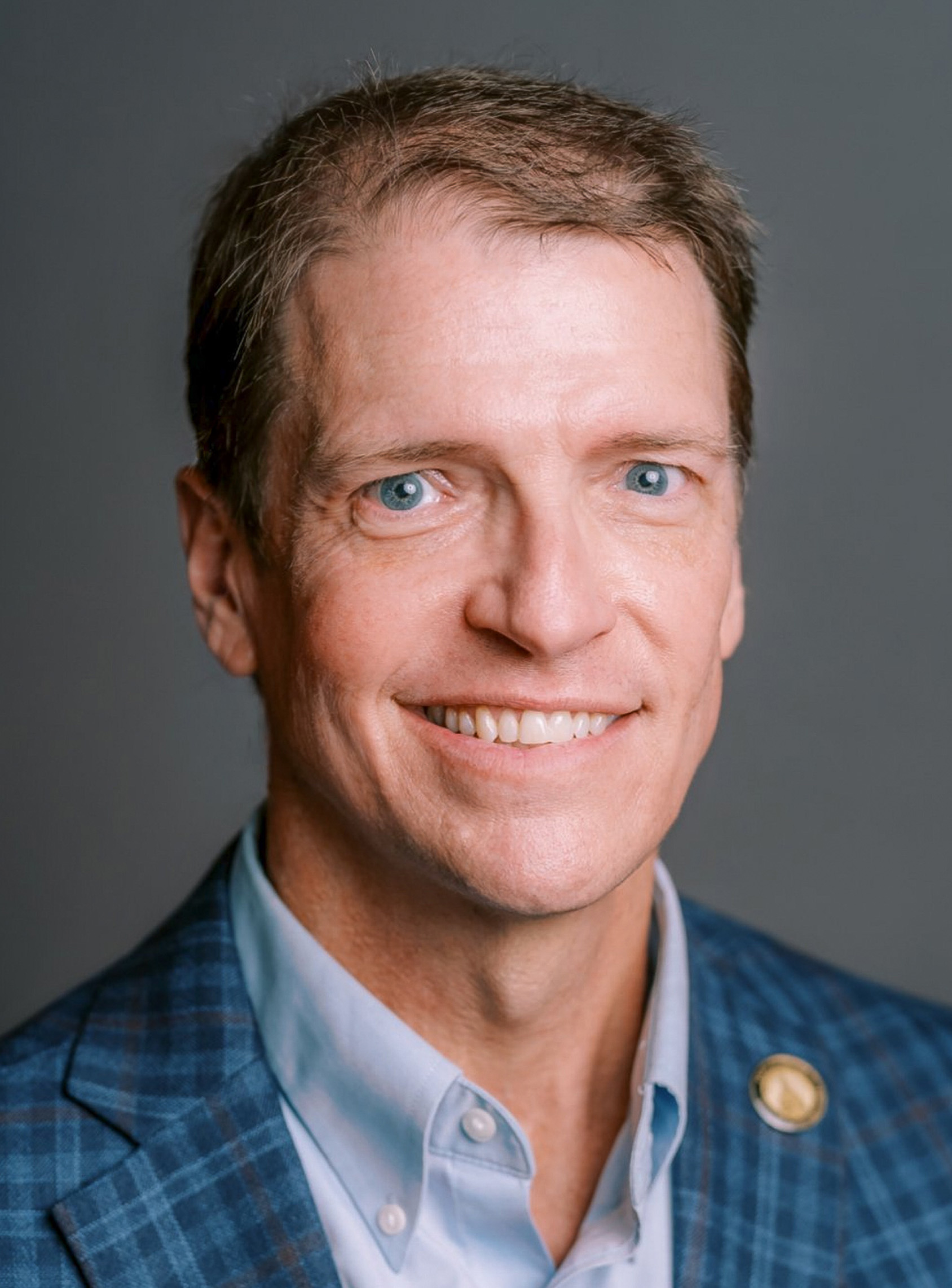

Member of the Georgia House of Representatives
- Incumbent
- Assumed office January 14, 2013
- Preceded by: Keith Heard
- Constituency: 118th District (2013–2023); 122nd District (2023–Present)

Personal details
- Born: Spencer Robert Frye; December 14, 1967 (age 58)
- Party: Democratic
- Education: University of Georgia

Spencer Robert Frye (born December 14, 1967) is an American politician who serves in the Georgia General Assembly as the state representative for Georgia House District 122. He is a member of the Democratic Party.

== Personal life ==
Frye was born December 14, 1967, in Starkville, Mississippi. Frye's parents were two college students. At the age of 2, his family moved to Germany where his father, a member of the United States Army, was stationed. In 1984, Frye moved to Georgia after his father accepted a job to be the head pastor at a Presbyterian church in Griffin, GA.

Today, Frye lives in Athens, Georgia where he has resided since 1989. His wife, Gretchen, is an emergency room nurse at Athens Regional Hospital. The couple has been married since 2000 and has two children, Spencer and Ruby, both of whom attend public school in the district that Frye represents.

== Education ==
After graduating high school from Woodward Academy in 1986, Frye went on to study at the University of Georgia.

Frye left the university in 1988 to work in Haiti. He first lived in the island country at the age of 13 and had the opportunity to learn construction skills while building a Baptist church in Pechaud. As a young adult, Frye taught English as a second language at L'Ecole Saint Espris Vocational School. After a year, he returned to the University of Georgia but left again due to financial hardship.

Though Frye had every intention of returning to school quickly, he did not re-enroll until almost twenty-five years later. In the fall 2013, he signed up to take the first of his two remaining classes, wanting to set a good example for his children about the importance of attaining an education and finishing what you start. Frye has also said he hopes his experience will encourage others to return to school or attain job skills that will help them build a future.

After taking classes for two fall semesters, Frye graduated from the University of Georgia with a Bachelor of Science in Psychology on December 19, 2014. This experience was eye opening to Frye, who said he saw the many barriers students face when trying to finish a degree, such as the expenses of required electronics.

== Business ==
Since 2006, Frye has worked as the Executive Director for Athens Area Habitat for Humanity. He first started at Habitat in 1999 as a construction manager, planning to only work with the non-profit for a year. After seeing the fulfilling work that Habitat does first hand, Frye knew that he wanted to continue helping families purchase their own homes and decided to stay.

Today, as executive director, he carries out board and Habitat International policy, handles day-to-day operations, oversees all acquisitions, developments and constructions as the licensed contractor, and oversees operations at both Habitat for Humanity Restores in Athens. Through this work, he hopes to make a difference in peoples lives by breaking the cycles of poverty.

Frye has also been a small business owner, exported American ambulances to the Middle East, fronted rock bands, and co-founded an environmental company.

== Political history ==
Frye began his political career in 2010 when he ran in the nonpartisan race for Athens Mayor. Out of the five candidates, Frye received 21% of the vote (5,498) but lost to tax commissioner Nancy Denson who received 34% of the vote (8,929).

In 2012, Frye ran to be the Georgia State Representative for the 118th District, which includes Winterville and parts of Athens. In the July Democratic Primary, Frye faced 20 year Incumbent, Keith Heard, who he defeated with 55.33% of the vote, which he attributed to his strong involvement in the community. He then went on to win in a landslide with 70.42% of the vote in the General Election against Republican Carter Kessler.

Today, Frye serves on the Budget and Fiscal Oversight Committee as the first Democrat to be appointed to committee leadership since 2004. He also serves as a member on the Game, Fish, and Parks; Ways and Means; Transportation; Health and Human Services; Human Relations and Aging Committees. In 2018, Frye was appointed to the Working Group on Creative Arts and Entertainment and the Special Committee on Access to Quality Health Care. Previously, he also served on the Science and Technology Committee.

In 2016, Frye was appointed to the Joint Georgia House and Senate Music Economic Development Study Committee, which worked to encourage and promote the continued growth and success of the music industry in the state. Frye has said he was excited to be appointed because he was interested in tax incentives to benefit smaller music studios, and even the individual musicians, working in Georgia, as well as the larger music enterprises. In 2015, Frye was the only Democrat to serve on the House Study Committee on Short-Term Rental Providers, which worked to determine the best methods to ensure the safety of the public, prevent illegal practices, collect taxes on business activities, and otherwise properly regulate short-term rental providers.

Throughout his time in the Georgia General Assembly, Frye has devoted his time to supporting legislation that strengthens all Georgia families, protects waterways, ensures the safety of our children, improves transportation, and promotes more access to housing and healthcare.

== Fellowship ==
In 2011, when Frye first began campaigning for State Representative he recruited a group of university students from the Athens area to be a part of the 2012 campaign staff. He was inspired by their excitement, hard work, and desire to work on legislation, so after being elected he founded the Spencer Frye Fellowship Program.

During the first session, it became apparent that the Fellowship was unique and unmatched. No one else in the General Assembly had this pool of young pupils of various undergrad and graduate programs that were able to provide a commitment to constituents and detailed analyses of policy.

Today, the Fellowship has grown to be a selective year-long program that accepts 25 fellows each fall who are given the opportunity to grow as young professionals, leaders, and active community members. The Fellowship is divided into Public Relations Fellows and Legislative Fellows.

The program’s mission is to cultivate a coalition of aware and active leaders that will use their knowledge to impact our future; not only on a state level, but also on a global scale by bringing local relevance to the national and global community.

== Awards and memberships ==
Frye is a member of the Homebuilder's Association Board, UGA Masters of Public Administration Advisory Board, UGA School of Social Work Board of Visitors, Athens Rotary Club, Compassionate Care Hospice Advisory Board, and the Athens Clarke County Democratic Committee.

== Electoral history ==
2012 General Election, Georgia House of Representatives 118th District
Party	Candidate	Votes	%	±%
Democratic	Spencer Frye	12,117	70.42	
Republican	Carter Kessler	5,090	29.58	
Total votes		17,207	100%	

Georgia House of Representatives
Preceded by Keith Heard	Member of the Georgia House of Representatives from the 118th district 2013–2023	Succeeded by Clint Crowe
Preceded by Jodi Lott	Member of the Georgia House of Representatives from the 122nd district 2023–Present	Incumbent
