= Stark, Georgia =

Unincorporated community in Georgia, U.S.

Coordinates: 33°20′00″N 83°54′24″W

Stark is an unincorporated community in Butts County, in the U.S. state of Georgia.

== History ==
A post office called Stark was established in 1858, and remained in operation until 1901. The community has the name of James H. Stark, a judge.
