= Ben Harbin =

American politician (1963–2025)

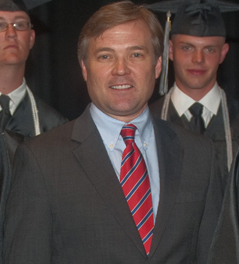
- Harbin in 2011

Member of the Georgia House of Representatives
- In office 1994 – July 7, 2015
- Preceded by: Martha Moore
- Succeeded by: Jodi Lott

Chair of the Richmond County Republican Party
- In office 1990–1991
- In office 1993–1994

Personal details
- Born: Benjie Lewis Harbin; October 28, 1963 Lyons, Georgia, U.S.
- Died: April 30, 2025 (aged 61) Augusta, Georgia, U.S.
- Party: Republican
- Spouse: Hope Whitfield (m. 1989)
- Children: 2 (Note: 1 deceased)
- Education: Georgia Military College
- Profession: Lobbyist

Benjie Lewis Harbin (October 28, 1963 – April 30, 2025) was an American lobbyist and politician of the Republican Party who was involved in Georgian politics.

== Life and career ==
Harbin was born in Lyons, Georgia on October 28, 1963. He received an associate of science degree in business administration from Georgia Military College. Harbin was the chair of the Republican Party in Richmond County from 1990 until 1991 and again from 1993 until 1994. He succeeded Martha Moore to represent District 113 of the Georgia House of Representatives, which represents Columbia County. He served on the house from 1994 until July 7, 2015. Following his resignation, Harbin became a lobbyist. He was succeeded by Jodi Lott.

While on the Georgia House of Representatives, Harbin was the Chairman of the Committee on Appropriations from 2005 until 2011. His other chairmanships include vice-chair of Appropriations Subcommittee on Health, chair of Subcommittee on Energy, Utilities, & Telecommunications and chair of Ways and Means Subcommittee on Tax. Harbin endorsed Mitt Romney at the 2012 Republican Primary.

Harbin was charged with reckless driving in October 2008, for which he was fined $1,000 and sentenced to perform 100 hours of community service. He had been charged with driving under the influence in May 2007 and had faced additional charges of striking a fixed object and failure to maintain lane, which were dropped.

Harbin married Hope Whitfield in 1989, with whom he had two children. His daughter, Caitlin, died in 2023. Harbin died at a hotel in Augusta, Georgia on April 30, 2025, at the age of 61. His death is considered as being natural with no suspicion of foul play.
