= Beth Camp =

American politician

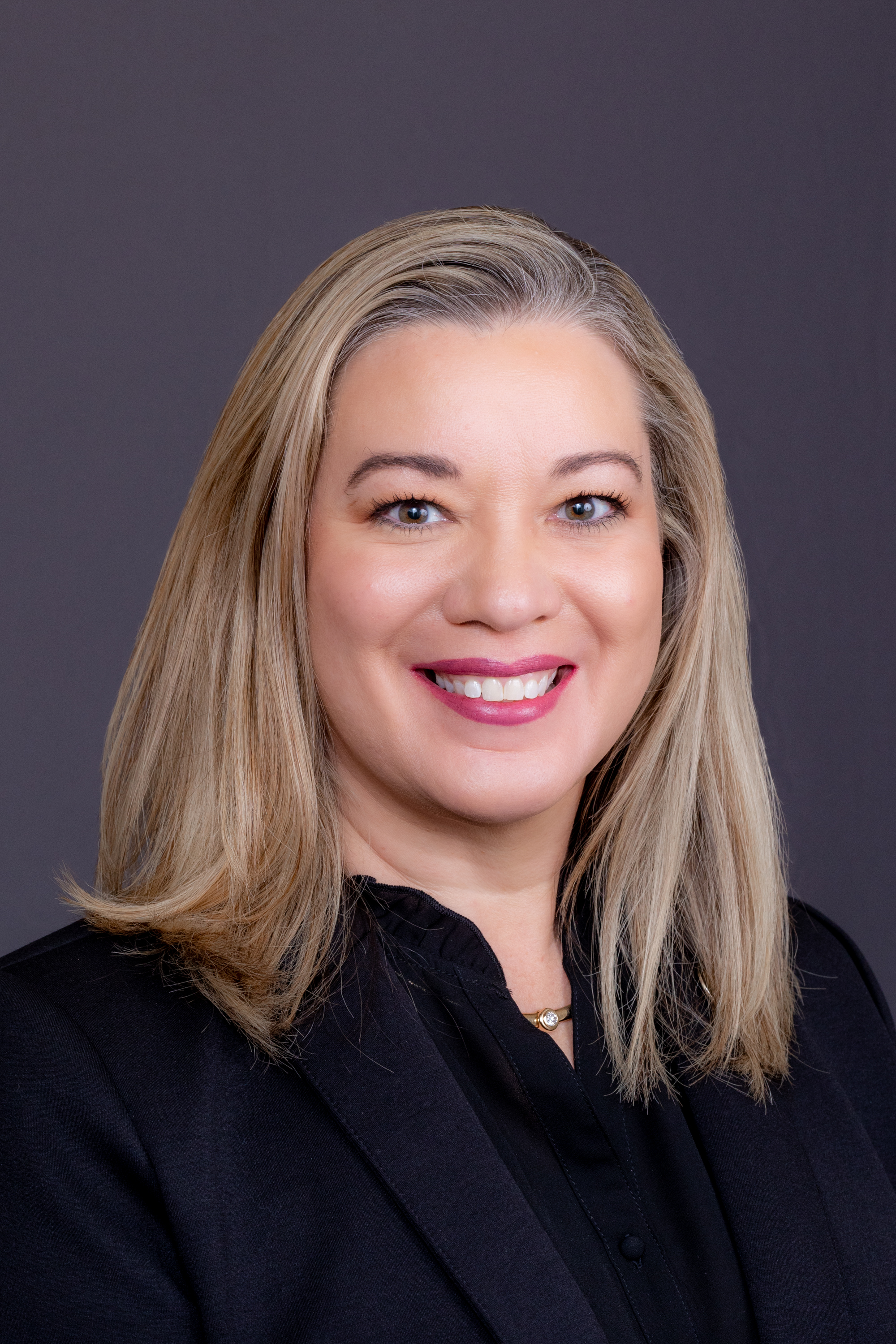

Member of the Georgia House of Representatives
- Incumbent
- Assumed office January 11, 2021
- Preceded by: Ken Pullin
- Constituency: 131st District (2021–2023); 135th District (2023–Present)

Personal details
- Born: January 10, 1974 (age 52)
- Party: Republican
- Spouse: Mark Camp
- Website: campforgeorgia.com

Elizabeth Anne Camp (born 1974) is an American businesswoman from Georgia. Camp is a Republican member of Georgia House of Representatives for District 135. She is a former member of the Pike County, Georgia Board of Education (2017-2020).

== Education ==
Camp is a Cum Laude graduate of Georgia Military College in Milledgeville, Georgia. She earned a Bachelor's degree with honors in Integrative Studies/Psychology from Clayton State University. She obtained a Master's degree from the University of Alabama in Communications Studies, becoming a member of the Lambda Pi Eta honor society.

== Career ==
At the age of 17, Camp began working as a 911 operator later to become an emergency medical technician. For several years, she was the farm manager at Mar-Be-Me Farm which she and her husband own in Concord, Georgia. Camp has been a full-time realtor since 2006. She was the managing broker of Coldwell Banker Bullard Realty in Zebulon from 2018 until 2023. She is currently a Georgia licensed real estate broker/Realtor(R) and owner of Camp & Associates, LLC.

== Political History ==
Ms. Camp began her political career making phone calls for candidate George H.W. Bush in the 1988 Presidential campaign to inspire voters to get to the polls. This experience was instrumental in the role the individual plays in the political process. Over the next few decades, she was involved in a multitude of volunteer and civic roles to improve the lives of others.

Camp was non-contested when she ran for public office the first time in 2016 as District 4 member of the Pike County Board of Education. She served a whole term before seeking the open seat of Georgia House District 131 in March 2020.

Camp was sworn in to represent House District 131 January 11, 2021. After redistricting, she was re-elected as House Representative to the newly formed House District 135 being sworn in for a second term on January 9, 2023.

Camp serves on the following committees in the Georgia House of Representatives 2025-2026 session: Intergovernmental Coordination; Agriculture & Consumer Affairs; Energy, Utilities & Telecommunications; State Planning; Judiciary Juvenile (Chairman); and Ways & Means.

Georgia House of Representatives
Preceded by Ken Pullin	Member of the Georgia House of Representatives from the 131st district 2021–2023
