= Treaty of Indian Springs (1825) =

Land cession treaty between the Muscogee tribe and the United States

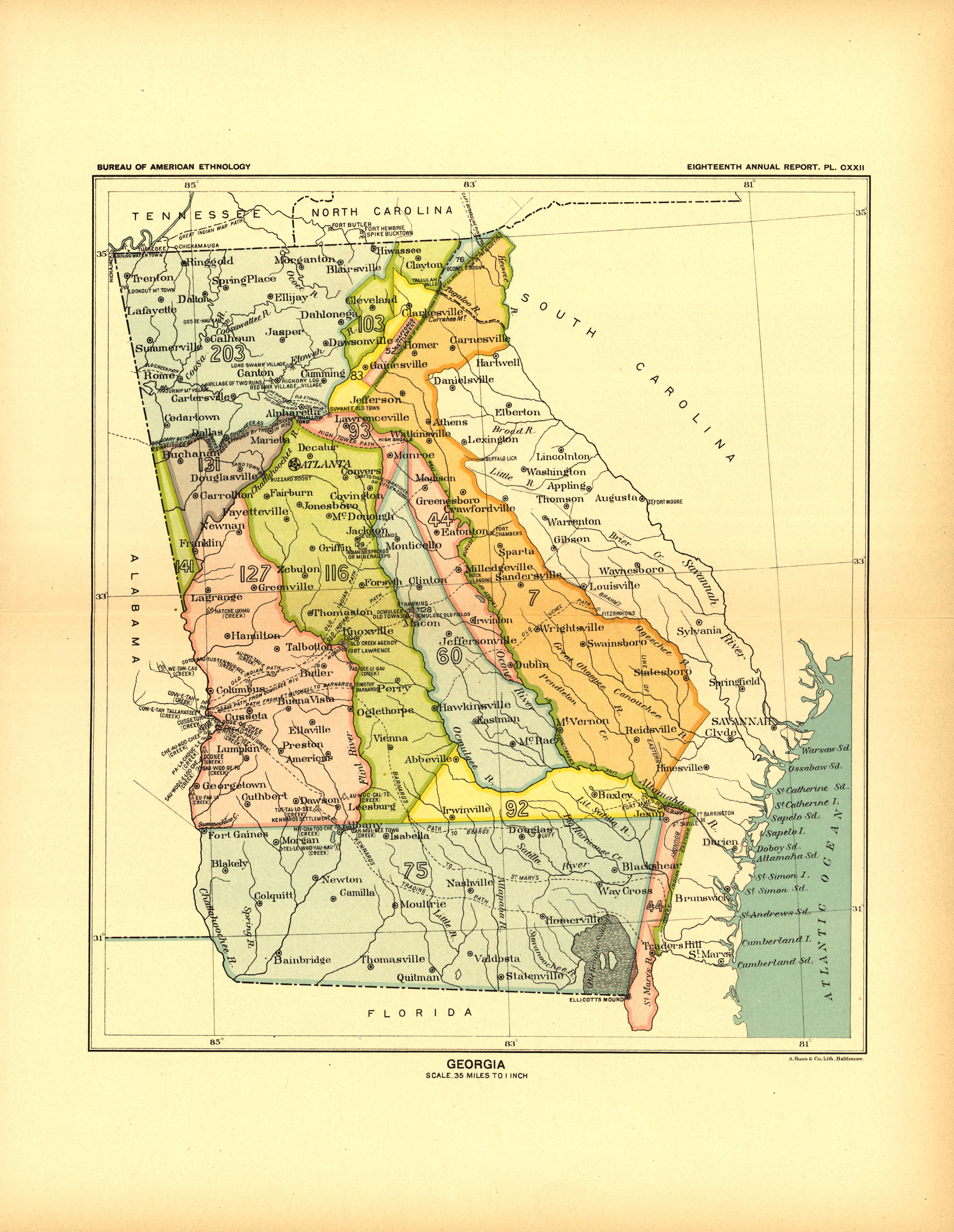
Map of Georgia from Indian land cessions in the United States; lands ceded under the Treaty of Indian Springs are colored pink

The Treaty of Indian Springs, also known as the Second Treaty of Indian Springs and the Treaty with the Creeks, is a treaty concluded between the Muscogee and the United States originally on February 12, 1825, with an additional article added on February 14, 1825, at what is now the Indian Springs Hotel Museum.

== Background ==
The Muscogee and the United States had signed the First Treaty of Indian Springs in 1821, under which the former ceded their territory east of the Flint River to Georgia. In exchange, the federal government of the United States paid them $200,000 in installments and assumed their debts to the Georgian people.

In December 1824, the American envoys Duncan Campbell and James Meriwether tried and failed to secure a treaty that would see the Muscogee cede their territory east of the Mississippi River to the United States.

== The treaty ==
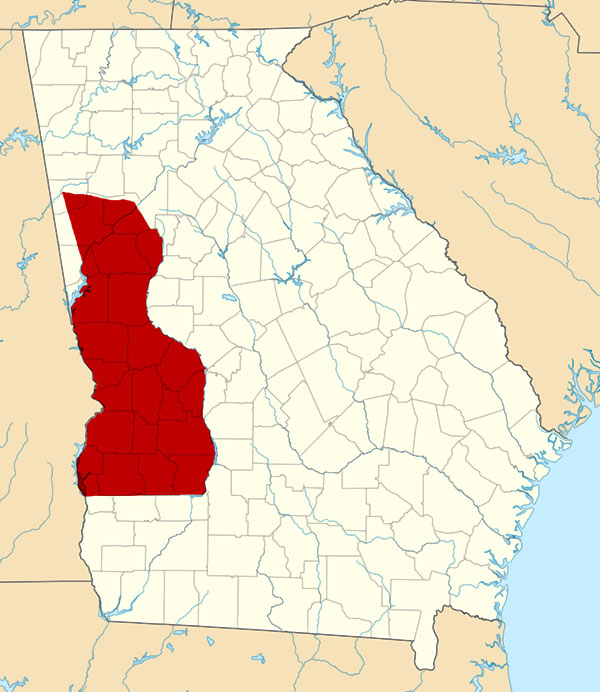
Muscogee cessions in Georgia under the treaty

The treaty that was agreed was negotiated with six chiefs of the Lower Creek, led by William McIntosh. McIntosh agreed to cede all Muscogee lands east of the Chattahoochee River, including the sacred Ocmulgee National Monument, to Georgia and Alabama, and accepted relocation west of the Mississippi River to an equivalent parcel of land along the Arkansas River. In compensation for the move to unimproved land, and to aid in obtaining supplies, the Muscogee nation would receive $200,000 paid in decreasing installments over a period of years.

== Aftermath ==
The United States Senate ratified the treaty on March 7 by a margin of one vote.

The treaty was popular with Georgians, who reelected George Troup governor in the state's first popular election in 1825. It was signed by only six chiefs; the Creek National Council denounced it, ordering the execution of McIntosh and the other Muscogee signatories, as it was a capital crime to alienate tribal land. On April 29, the Upper Creek chief Menawa took 200 warriors to attack McIntosh at his plantation (McIntosh Reserve) on the Chattahoochee River in present-day Carroll County, Georgia. They killed him and two other signatories, and set fire to the house. Both his sons-in-law, Samuel and Benjamin Hawkins, Jr. were slated for execution; Samuel was hanged but Benjamin escaped and lived for another decade.

A delegation from the Creek National Council, led by chief Opothleyahola, traveled to Washington, D.C., with a petition to the American president John Quincy Adams to have it revoked. They negotiated the 1826 Treaty of Washington, in which the Muscogee surrendered most of the lands sought by Georgia under more generous terms, retaining a small piece of land on the Georgia-Alabama border and the Ocmulgee National Monument. They were, moreover, not required to move west.

Troup refused to recognize the new treaty, and ordered the Muscogee lands surveyed for a land lottery. He began forcibly evicting the Lower Creek. Adams threatened federal intervention, but backed down after Troup mobilized Georgia militia.
