= Segun Adeyina =

United States politician

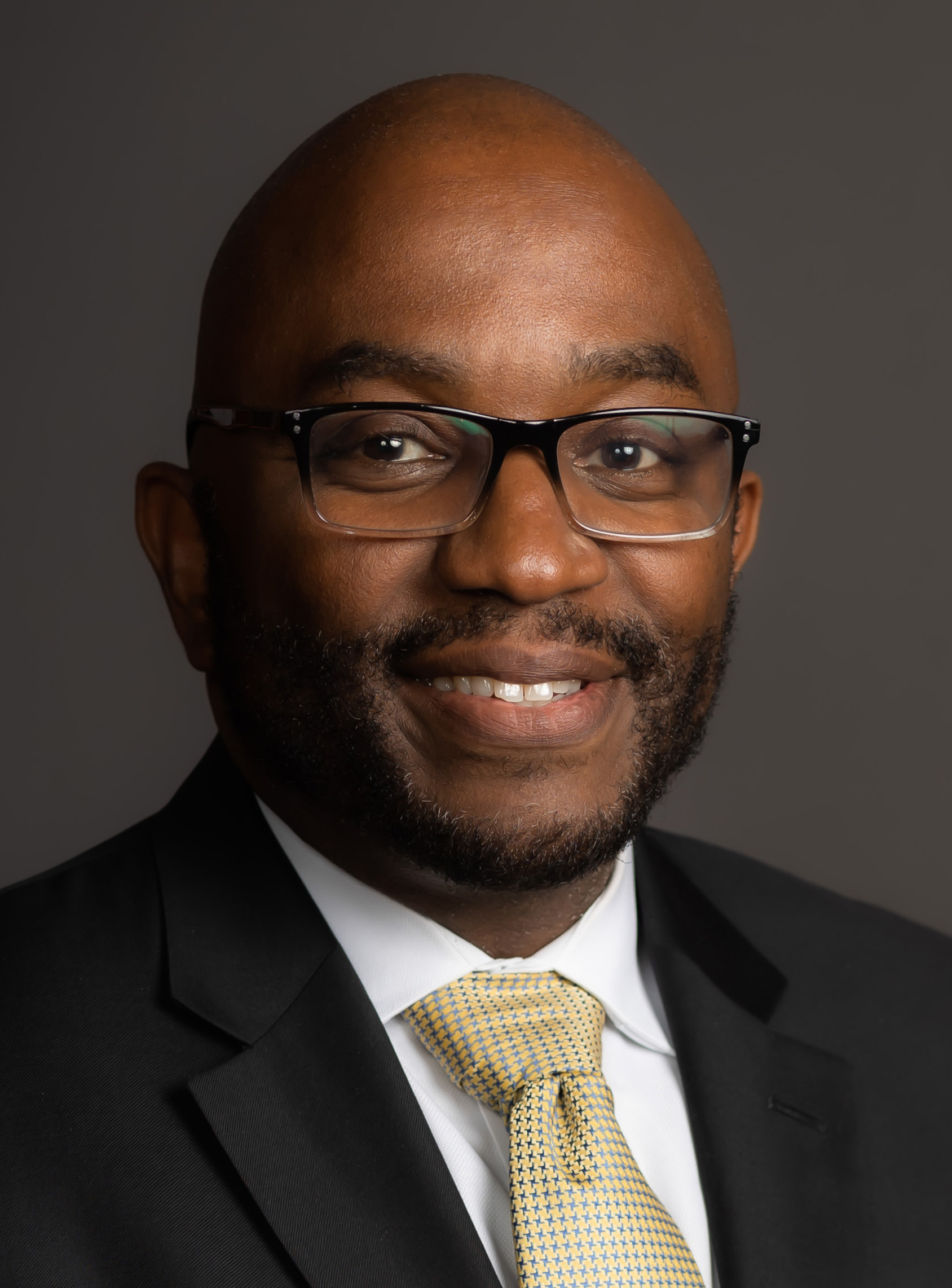

Member of the Georgia House of Representatives from the 110th district
- Incumbent
- Assumed office January 9, 2023
- Preceded by: Donna McLeod (Redistricting)

Personal details
- Born: Nigeria
- Citizenship: Nigeria; United States
- Education: University of Akron

Segun Adeyina is an American politician who is a Democratic Party member of the Georgia House of Representatives, elected in 2022 and assuming office on January 9, 2023.

== Education ==
Adeyina is a graduate of electrical engineering from the University of Akron, Ohio.
