= Indian Springs, Georgia =

- Unincorporated community Census-designated place
- Location in Catoosa County and the state of Georgia
- Coordinates: 34°57′33″N 85°9′50″W
- Country: United States
- State: Georgia
- County: Catoosa

Area
  - Total: 2.56 sq mi (6.63 km^{2})
  - Land: 2.56 sq mi (6.63 km^{2})
  - Water: 0 sq mi (0.00 km^{2})
- Elevation: 719 ft (219 m)

Population (2020)
  - Total: 2,336
  - Density: 912.1/sq mi (352.16/km^{2})
- Time zone: UTC-5 (Eastern (EST))
  - Summer (DST): UTC-4 (EDT)
- ZIP code: 30736
- Area codes: 706/762
- FIPS code: 13-41036
- GNIS feature ID: 0332059

Indian Springs is an unincorporated community and census-designated place (CDP) in Catoosa County, Georgia, United States. The population was 2,336 at the 2020 census. It is part of the Chattanooga, TN–GA Metropolitan Statistical Area.

== History ==
In 1800, General William McIntosh built a cottage here to, it is understood, spend the winter months. Along with a double log cabin built by a Mr. Allison, it was destroyed by fire. In 1823, McIntosh and Joel Bailey erected the first hotel. It still stands today, known as the Varner House. It was there that the 1825 Treaty of Indian Springs was signed.

== Geography ==
Indian Springs is located at 34°57′33″N 85°9′50″W (34.959131, -85.163983).

According to the United States Census Bureau, the CDP has a total area of 2.6 square miles (6.7 km^{2}), all land.

== Demographics ==
Historical population
Census	Pop.	Note	%±
1990	1,273		—
2000	1,982		55.7%
2010	2,241		13.1%
2020	2,336		4.2%
U.S. Decennial Census; 1850-1870 1870-1880; 1890-1910 1920-1930; 1940 1950 1960; 1970 1980 1990; 2000 2010 2020

Indian Springs first appeared as a census designated place in the 1990 U.S. census.

=== Racial and ethnic composition ===
Indian Springs, Georgia – Racial and ethnic composition Note: the U.S. census treats Hispanic/Latino as an ethnic category. This table excludes Latinos from the racial categories and assigns them to a separate category. Hispanics/Latinos may be of any race.
Race / Ethnicity (NH = Non-Hispanic)	Pop 2000	Pop 2010	Pop 2020	% 2000	% 2010	% 2020
White alone (NH)	1,932	2,067	2,092	97.48%	92.24%	89.55%
Black or African American alone (NH)	9	35	49	0.45%	1.56%	2.10%
Native American or Alaska Native alone (NH)	0	6	9	0.00%	0.27%	0.39%
Asian alone (NH)	19	24	16	0.96%	1.07%	0.68%
Pacific Islander alone (NH)	0	0	1	0.00%	0.00%	0.04%
Some Other Race alone (NH)	0	0	3	0.00%	0.00%	0.13%
Mixed race or Multiracial (NH)	12	48	98	0.61%	2.14%	4.20%
Hispanic or Latino (any race)	10	61	68	0.50%	2.72%	2.91%
Total	1,982	2,241	2,336	100.00%	100.00%	100.00%

=== 2020 census ===
As of the 2020 census, Indian Springs had a population of 2,336. The median age was 39.8 years. 22.5% of residents were under the age of 18 and 16.0% of residents were 65 years of age or older. For every 100 females there were 98.6 males, and for every 100 females age 18 and over there were 94.1 males age 18 and over.

100.0% of residents lived in urban areas, while 0.0% lived in rural areas.

There were 863 households in Indian Springs, of which 37.1% had children under the age of 18 living in them. Of all households, 58.2% were married-couple households, 14.4% were households with a male householder and no spouse or partner present, and 19.8% were households with a female householder and no spouse or partner present. About 20.2% of all households were made up of individuals and 10.0% had someone living alone who was 65 years of age or older.

There were 903 housing units, of which 4.4% were vacant. The homeowner vacancy rate was 1.6% and the rental vacancy rate was 3.2%.

=== 2000 census ===
As of the census of 2000, there were 1,982 people, 765 households, and 583 families residing in the CDP. The population density was 771.9 inhabitants per square mile (298.0/km^{2}). There were 801 housing units at an average density of 311.9 per square mile (120.4/km^{2}). The racial makeup of the CDP was 97.68% White, 0.45% African American, 0.96% Asian, 0.25% from other races, and 0.66% from two or more races. Hispanic or Latino of any race were 0.50% of the population.

There were 765 households, out of which 35.9% had children under the age of 18 living with them, 65.9% were married couples living together, 7.6% had a female householder with no husband present, and 23.7% were non-families. 20.4% of all households were made up of individuals, and 7.5% had someone living alone who was 65 years of age or older. The average household size was 2.59 and the average family size was 2.99.

In the CDP, the population was spread out, with 25.8% under the age of 18, 6.6% from 18 to 24, 33.9% from 25 to 44, 22.9% from 45 to 64, and 10.8% who were 65 years of age or older. The median age was 36 years. For every 100 females, there were 96.6 males. For every 100 females age 18 and over, there were 92.5 males.

The median income for a household in the CDP was $45,399, and the median income for a family was $51,350. Males had a median income of $35,313 versus $22,031 for females. The per capita income for the CDP was $18,499. About 7.9% of families and 11.1% of the population were below the poverty line, including 14.0% of those under age 18 and 18.6% of those age 65 or over.
