= Richard H. Smith =

American politician from Georgia (1945–2024)

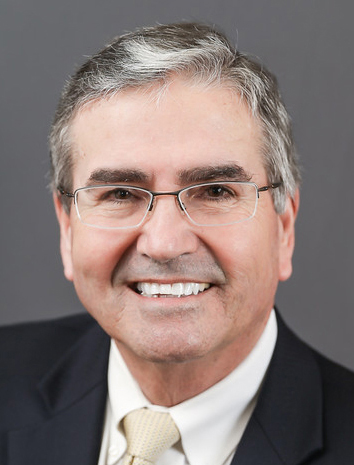

Member of the Georgia House of Representatives
- In office January 10, 2005 – January 30, 2024
- Succeeded by: Carmen Rice
- Constituency: 131st district (2005–2013); 134th district (2013–2023); 139th district (2023–2024)

City Councillor, Columbus, Georgia
- In office 1997–2002
- Constituency: Post 9 At Large

Personal details
- Born: March 9, 1945 Wrightsville, Georgia, U.S.
- Died: January 30, 2024 (aged 78)
- Party: Republican
- Spouse: Clara
- Children: 3
- Education: Louisiana State University; University of Florida

Richard Herbert Smith (March 9, 1945 – January 30, 2024) was an American politician. A Republican, he served in the Georgia House of Representatives from 2005 until his death in 2024.

== Personal life ==
Prior to public office, Smith served in the University of Florida Cooperative Extension Service from 1970 to 1978, and in the University of Georgia Cooperative Extension Service from 1978 to 1999. While serving at UGA as extension director, he also served as an adjunct professor at UGA from 1990 to 1999.

== Political career ==
Smith served as Interim City Manager of Columbus, Georgia from 1989 to 1990. Smith was a City Councilmember in Columbus, Georgia, from 1997 to 2002.

Smith was elected to represent the 134th district in the Georgia House of Representatives in 2004. He was re-elected without opposition until 2020, when he faced Democrat Carl Sprayberry in the general election. Smith's districts largely fell within northern Columbus-Muscogee County.

Smith sat on the following committees:

- Appropriations
- Insurance (chairman, 2011–2020)
- Legislative & Congressional Reapportionment
- Natural Resources & Environment
- Rules (Chairman, 2020–2024)
- Special Committee on Access to Quality Health Care

Smith died on January 30, 2024, at the age of 78.
