= Georgia's 139th House of Representatives district =

State district in Georgia, USA

Georgia's 139th State House of Representatives district
Representative
Carmen Rice; R–Columbus
- Demographics: 36.7% White; 55.3% Black; 5.8% Hispanic; 0.9% Asian
- Population: 49,640

District 139 elects one member of the Georgia House of Representatives. It contains parts of Harris County and Muscogee County.

== Members ==
- David Lucas (2005–2011)
- James Beverly (2011–2013)
- Patty Marie Stinson (2013–2023)
- Richard H. Smith (2023–2024)
- Carmen Rice (since 2024)
