= Butts County, Georgia =

County in Georgia, United States

- County
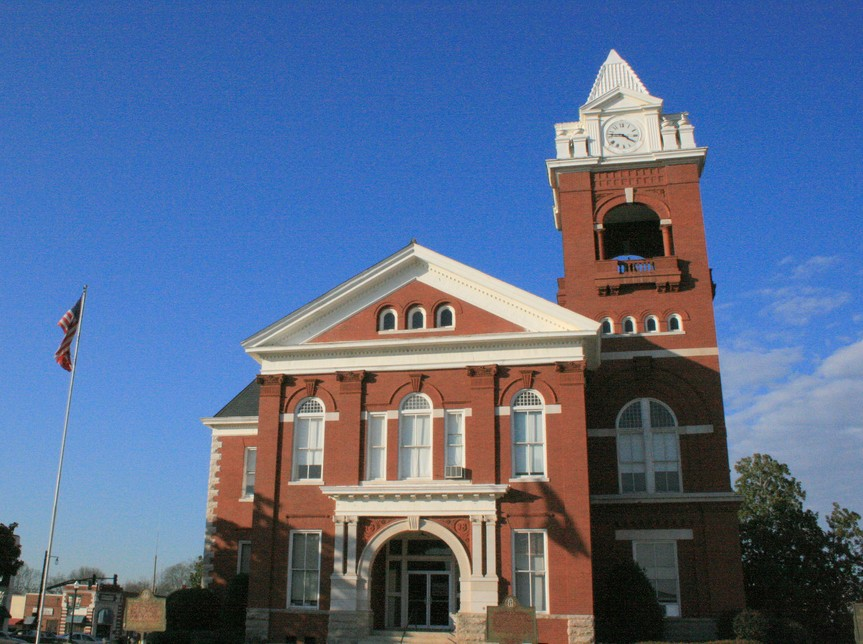
- Butts County Courthouse in Jackson

- Seal

- Location within the U.S. state of Georgia
- Coordinates: 33°17′N 83°58′W
- Country: United States
- State: Georgia
- Founded: 1825; 201 years ago
- Named for: Samuel Butts
- Seat: Jackson
- Largest city: Jackson

Area
  - Total: 188 sq mi (490 km^{2})
  - Land: 184 sq mi (480 km^{2})
  - Water: 3.6 sq mi (9.3 km^{2}) 1.9%

Population (2020)
  - Total: 25,434
  - Estimate (2025): 27,218 ▲
  - Density: 138/sq mi (53.4/km^{2})
- Time zone: UTC−5 (Eastern)
  - Summer (DST): UTC−4 (EDT)
- Congressional district: 10th
- Website: buttscountyga.com

Butts County is a county in the West Central region of the U.S. state of Georgia. As of the 2020 census, the population was 25,434, up from 23,655 in 2010. The county seat is Jackson. The county was created on December 24, 1825.

Butts County is included in the Atlanta-Sandy Springs-Roswell MSA. In 2010, the center of population of Georgia was located in the northeastern portion of the county.

== History ==
Butts County was formed on December 24, 1825, as the sixty-fourth county in Georgia from portions of Henry County and Monroe County. It was named by the Georgia General Assembly in honor of Samuel Butts, an officer who was killed in the Creek War in 1814. A year later, Jackson was created as the first city in the new county and became the county seat. Other towns followed, including Indian Springs (1837); Flovilla (1883); Jenkinsburg (1889); and Pepperton (1897). Indian Springs later disincorporated and Pepperton was merged with Jackson in 1966, leaving just three incorporated cities in Butts County. In recent years, Indian Springs has again become a tourist destination including many historic sites, shops, eating establishment and the famous Indian Springs Hotel as its centerpiece.

Much of Butts County and its cities were destroyed by the army of General William T. Sherman in its March to the Sea during the American Civil War. Butts County struggled for decades afterwards to become economically stable again. The arrival of the first railroad train on May 5, 1882, started the resurgence and growth followed. In 1898, caught up in the post-reconstruction fervor that had infected most Georgia counties, Butts County erected a monumental courthouse designed by Bruce & Morgan. This building was used as a courthouse until 2019; following renovations, it is now a museum and visitor center. The construction of the Lloyd Shoals dam in 1910 created Jackson Lake, a recreational lake located primarily in Butts County.

Progress milestones in Butts County include the first telephones in 1884; first waterworks in 1905; electric lights on February 19, 1907; and traffic lights in 1926.

In 2007, Butts County, along with the city of Flovilla, were both designated as Georgia Signature Communities by the Georgia Department of Community Affairs. This prestigious designation was given to a total of 12 communities in Georgia that year.

== Geography ==
According to the U.S. Census Bureau, the county has a total area of 188 square miles (490 km^{2}), of which 184 square miles (480 km^{2}) is land and 3.6 square miles (9.3 km^{2}) (1.9%) is water. The entirety of Butts County is located in the Upper Ocmulgee River sub-basin of the Altamaha River basin.

=== Major highways ===
- Interstate 75 / State Route 401 (unsigned)
- U.S. Route 23
- State Route 16
- State Route 36
- State Route 42
- State Route 87

=== Adjacent counties ===
- Newton County (north)
- Jasper County (east)
- Monroe County (south)
- Lamar County (southwest)
- Spalding County (west)
- Henry County (northwest)

== Communities ==
=== Cities ===
- Flovilla
- Jackson
- Jenkinsburg

=== Unincorporated communities ===
- Stark
- Worthville

== Demographics ==
Historical population
Census	Pop.	Note	%±
1830	4,944		—
1840	5,308		7.4%
1850	6,488		22.2%
1860	6,455		−0.5%
1870	6,941		7.5%
1880	8,311		19.7%
1890	10,565		27.1%
1900	12,805		21.2%
1910	13,624		6.4%
1920	12,327		−9.5%
1930	9,345		−24.2%
1940	9,182		−1.7%
1950	9,079		−1.1%
1960	8,976		−1.1%
1970	10,560		17.6%
1980	13,665		29.4%
1990	15,326		12.2%
2000	19,522		27.4%
2010	23,655		21.2%
2020	25,434		7.5%
2025 (est.)	27,218	▲	7.0%
U.S. Decennial Census; 1790-1880 1890-1910; 1920-1930 1930-1940; 1940-1950 1960-1980; 1980-2000 2010 2020

=== Racial and ethnic composition ===
Butts County, Georgia – Racial and ethnic composition Note: the US Census treats Hispanic/Latino as an ethnic category. This table excludes Latinos from the racial categories and assigns them to a separate category. Hispanics/Latinos may be of any race.
Race / Ethnicity (NH = Non-Hispanic)	Pop 1980	Pop 1990	Pop 2000	Pop 2010	Pop 2020	% 1980	% 1990	% 2000	% 2010	% 2020
White alone (NH)	8,211	9,711	13,366	16,200	16,628	60.09%	63.36%	68.47%	68.48%	65.38%
Black or African American alone (NH)	5,226	5,421	5,601	6,431	6,808	38.24%	35.37%	28.69%	27.19%	26.77%
Native American or Alaska Native alone (NH)	21	38	72	52	39	0.15%	0.25%	0.37%	0.22%	0.15%
Asian alone (NH)	13	43	50	100	102	0.10%	0.28%	0.26%	0.42%	0.40%
Native Hawaiian or Pacific Islander alone (NH)	x	x	4	3	9	x	x	0.02%	0.01%	0.04%
Other race alone (NH)	3	0	6	19	164	0.02%	0.00%	0.03%	0.08%	0.64%
Mixed race or Multiracial (NH)	x	x	146	253	881	x	x	0.75%	1.07%	3.46%
Hispanic or Latino (any race)	191	113	277	597	803	1.40%	0.74%	1.42%	2.52%	3.16%
Total	13,665	15,326	19,522	23,655	25,434	100.00%	100.00%	100.00%	100.00%	100.00%

=== 2020 census ===
As of the 2020 census, the county had a population of 25,434. Of the residents, 19.9% were under the age of 18 and 16.6% were 65 years of age or older; the median age was 40.2 years. For every 100 females there were 115.3 males, and for every 100 females age 18 and over there were 119.3 males. 22.4% of residents lived in urban areas and 77.6% lived in rural areas.

The racial makeup of the county was 66.1% White, 26.9% Black or African American, 0.2% American Indian and Alaska Native, 0.4% Asian, 0.0% Native Hawaiian and Pacific Islander, 1.7% from some other race, and 4.7% from two or more races. Hispanic or Latino residents of any race comprised 3.2% of the population.

There were 8,460 households in the county, of which 32.7% had children under the age of 18 living with them and 27.0% had a female householder with no spouse or partner present. About 23.6% of all households were made up of individuals and 11.1% had someone living alone who was 65 years of age or older.

The census counted 5,823 families within the county.

There were 9,437 housing units, of which 10.4% were vacant. Among occupied housing units, 74.1% were owner-occupied and 25.9% were renter-occupied. The homeowner vacancy rate was 1.5% and the rental vacancy rate was 4.8%.

== Media ==
Butts County has one radio station: WJGA FM 92.1 and one local newspaper, the Jackson Progress-Argus. The county has gained attention in recent years as being a frequent backdrop for a number of movies and television shows. Most recently, the Netflix series Stranger Things made the Butts County city of Jackson, Georgia the backdrop of the show's fictional town of Hawkins, Indiana, turning the downtown area into a 1980s Indiana small town. In addition to the many buildings of the downtown that are visible in various scenes, the exterior of the Butts County Courthouse is featured, standing in for the Hawkins library.

The fact that Butts County serves as the filming location for key events in the show has already led fans there after just two seasons. Other shows which have filmed in the area include The Originals, a television show, and a recent remake of Endless Love by Universal Studios. Beginning October 18, 2024, Butts County Sheriff's Office began being featured in the Reelz live television program "On Patrol: Live."

== Government and infrastructure ==
=== County government ===
Butts County is governed by a Board of Commissioners composed of one commissioner from each of the county's five electoral districts. The commission members serve four year, staggered terms. The Board is presided over by the chairman, elected annually from the members of the commission to chair the meetings of the Board. The Board employs a County Administrator, Deputy County Administrator, County Clerk and nine department managers to oversee the daily affairs of the government.

There are four Constitutional Officers and three Elected Officials who are elected at-large by the voters of the county. The Constitutional Officers include the Sheriff; Tax Commissioner; Probate Judge and Clerk of the Superior Court. Elected officials include the Magistrate Judge; Coroner and County Surveyor. Other services are provided by departments headed by appointees of the Board of Commissioners.

In 2008, a movement began to create an elected, at-large chairman position to serve as presiding officer over the Board of Commissioners. This movement lost ground in 2009 and has not been revisited.

=== State representation ===
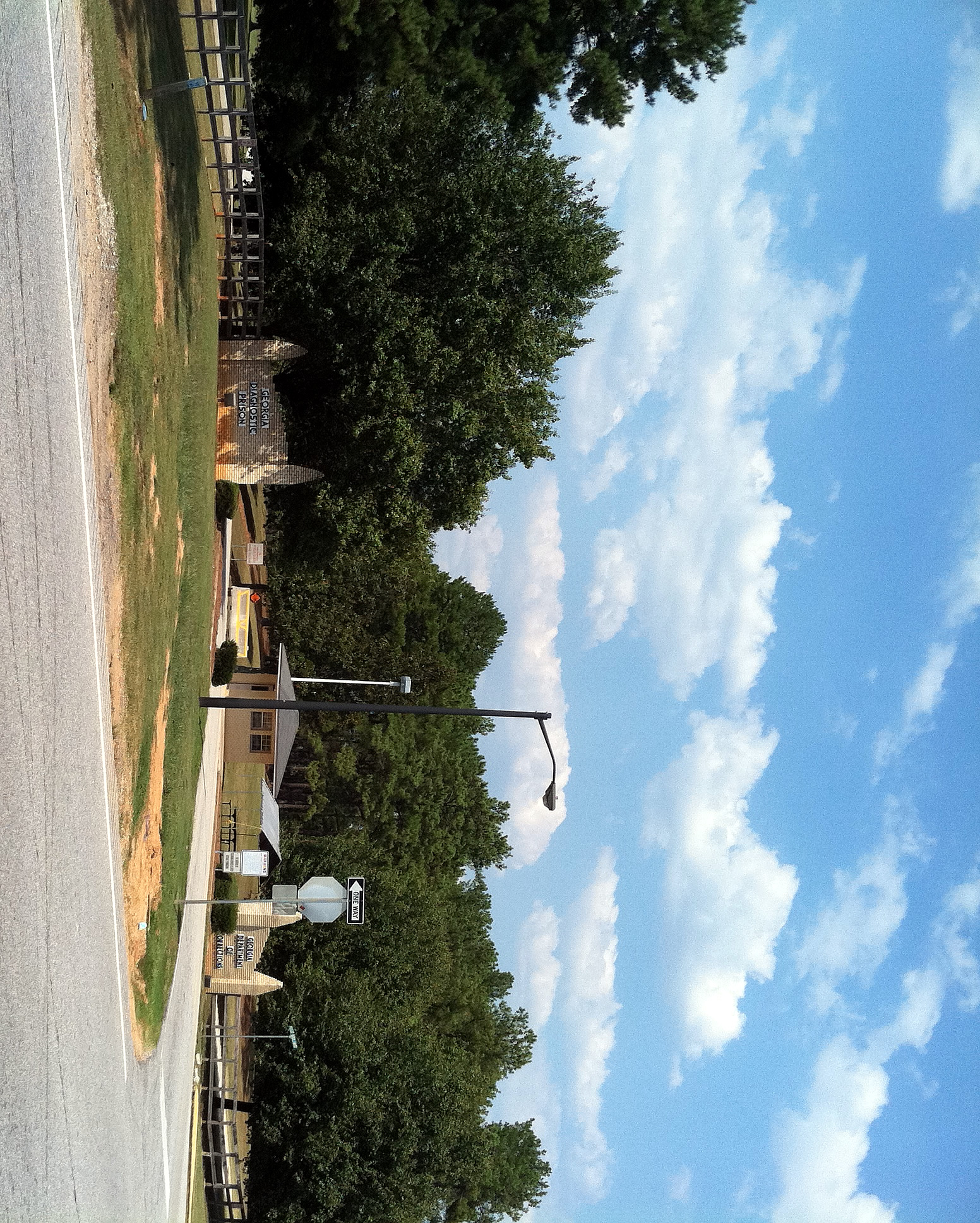
Georgia Diagnostic and Classification State Prison

The Georgia Diagnostic and Classification State Prison of the Georgia Department of Corrections is a maximum security prison in unincorporated Butts County. It is home to Georgia's death row for men and Georgia's execution facility. The prison is also home to maximum security general population (non-death row).

=== Politics ===
As of the 2020s, Butts County is a strongly Republican voting county, voting 72% for Donald Trump in 2024. For elections to the United States House of Representatives, Butts County is part of Georgia's 10th congressional district, currently represented by Mike Collins. For elections to the Georgia State Senate, Butts County is part of District 25. For elections to the Georgia House of Representatives, Butts County is part of District 118.

United States presidential election results for Butts County, Georgia
Year	Republican		Democratic		Third party(ies)	
Year	No.	%	No.	%	No.	%
1912	27	4.80%	490	87.03%	46	8.17%
1916	52	7.72%	595	88.28%	27	4.01%
1920	141	21.93%	502	78.07%	0	0.00%
1924	50	8.61%	493	84.85%	38	6.54%
1928	148	14.89%	846	85.11%	0	0.00%
1932	21	1.22%	1,693	98.14%	11	0.64%
1936	28	3.28%	820	96.13%	5	0.59%
1940	87	7.90%	1,012	91.92%	2	0.18%
1944	85	6.01%	1,330	93.99%	0	0.00%
1948	61	5.22%	987	84.50%	120	10.27%
1952	189	9.00%	1,910	91.00%	0	0.00%
1956	323	14.63%	1,885	85.37%	0	0.00%
1960	382	18.59%	1,673	81.41%	0	0.00%
1964	1,261	45.12%	1,534	54.88%	0	0.00%
1968	584	19.25%	959	31.62%	1,490	49.13%
1972	1,968	73.02%	727	26.98%	0	0.00%
1976	819	22.03%	2,898	77.97%	0	0.00%
1980	1,210	31.47%	2,574	66.94%	61	1.59%
1984	2,141	54.05%	1,820	45.95%	0	0.00%
1988	2,184	55.66%	1,730	44.09%	10	0.25%
1992	1,768	36.45%	2,448	50.46%	635	13.09%
1996	2,027	42.61%	2,271	47.74%	459	9.65%
2000	3,198	56.75%	2,281	40.48%	156	2.77%
2004	5,119	66.12%	2,572	33.22%	51	0.66%
2008	5,947	65.32%	3,065	33.67%	92	1.01%
2012	6,306	67.09%	2,968	31.57%	126	1.34%
2016	6,717	70.60%	2,566	26.97%	231	2.43%
2020	8,406	71.38%	3,274	27.80%	96	0.82%
2024	9,424	72.39%	3,544	27.22%	51	0.39%

United States Senate election results for Butts County, Georgia2
Year	Republican		Democratic		Third party(ies)	
Year	No.	%	No.	%	No.	%
2020	8,329	71.25%	3,129	26.77%	232	1.98%
2020	7,205	70.57%	3,004	29.43%	0	0.00%

United States Senate election results for Butts County, Georgia3
Year	Republican		Democratic		Third party(ies)	
Year	No.	%	No.	%	No.	%
2020	4,541	39.12%	2,207	19.01%	4,861	41.87%
2020	7,183	70.36%	3,026	29.64%	0	0.00%
2022	6,784	70.43%	2,666	27.68%	182	1.89%
2022	6,222	71.36%	2,497	28.64%	0	0.00%

Georgia Gubernatorial election results for Butts County
Year	Republican		Democratic		Third party(ies)	
Year	No.	%	No.	%	No.	%
2022	7,223	74.50%	2,420	24.96%	52	0.54%

== Education ==
All parts of the county are in the Butts County School District.

== See also ==
- National Register of Historic Places listings in Butts County, Georgia
- List of counties in Georgia
