= Indian Springs Hotel Museum =

- Indian Springs Hotel
- U.S. National Register of Historic Places
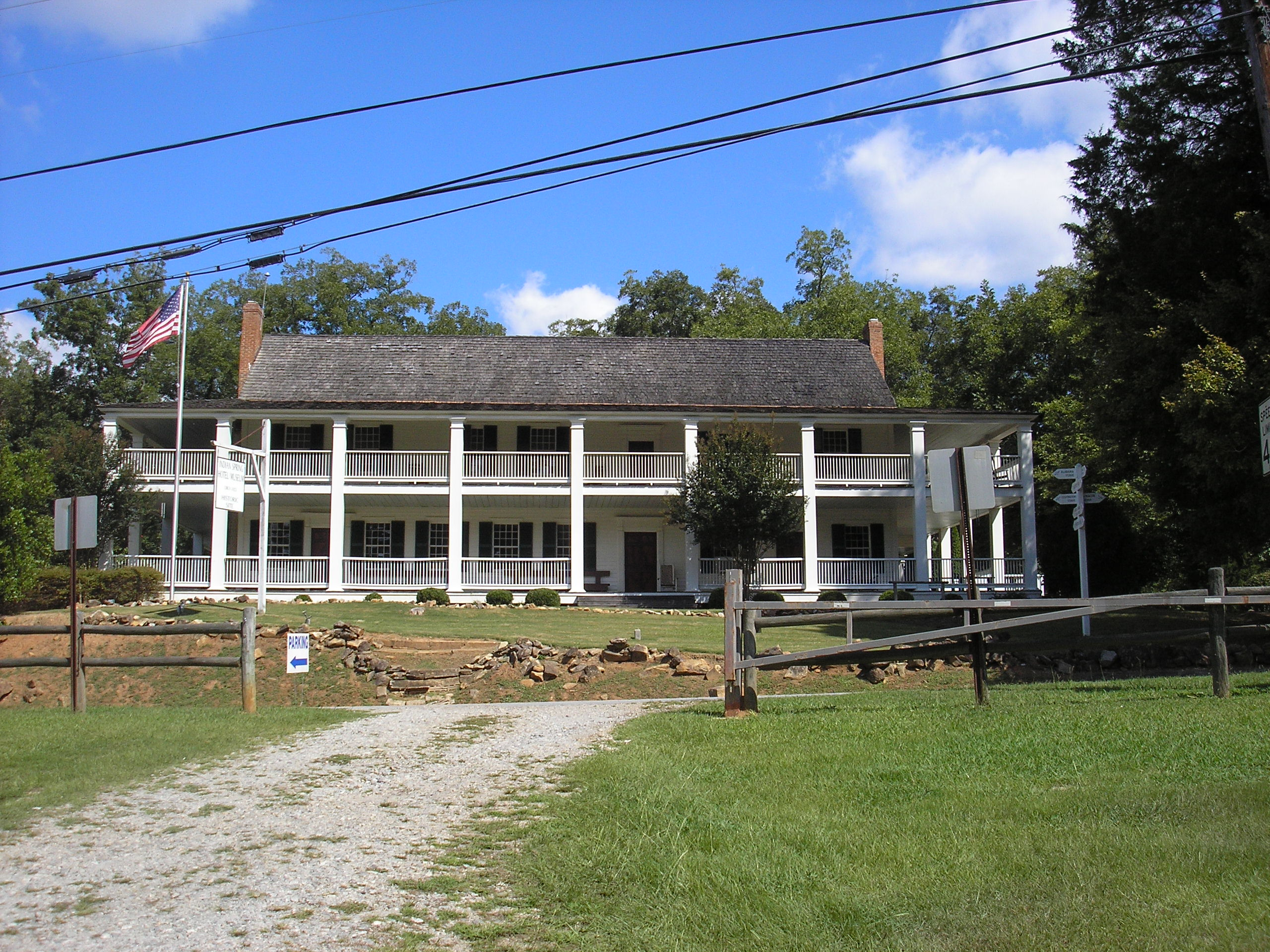

- Location within Georgia Location within the United States
- Location: GA 42, Indian Springs, Georgia
- Coordinates: 33°14′43″N 83°55′12″W
- Area: 2.6 acres (1.1 ha)
- Built: 1825
- NRHP reference No.: 73000612
- Added to NRHP: May 7, 1973

Indian Springs Hotel Museum is located in the former Indian Springs Hotel (also known as the Varner House), a historic hotel in Georgia established in 1825. The Treaty of 1825 was signed at the hotel; the Creek Indians ceded much of Georgia and Alabama to the United States in the treaty. During the American Civil War, Sherman's troops camped in the area. It is listed on the National Register of Historic Places. It has been restored and converted into a museum.

== See also ==
- National Register of Historic Places listings in Butts County, Georgia
