= Jackson High School (Georgia) =

Public high school in Jackson, Georgia, United States

Location
- 717 South Harkness St. Jackson, Georgia 30233; United States; 33°17′24″N 83°59′05″W

Information
- Motto: "Respect yourself, respect others, and respect our school."
- School district: Butts County School District
- Teaching staff: 63.10 FTE
- Grades: 9–12
- Enrollment: 1,071 (2023–2024)
- Student to teacher ratio: 16.97
- Colors: Red and navy blue
- Athletics: Georgia High School Association, Region 2-AAA
- Team name: Red Devils
- Newspaper: Red Letter
- Website: jhs.bcssk12.org

Jackson High School is a public high school in Jackson, Georgia, United States.

It has been an accredited school since 1947. It has 962 students as of the 2017–18 school year, educated by 58 certificated teachers. The school's athletic teams are known as the Red Devils with school colors of red and navy blue. Academic programs offered include Advanced Placement courses in biology, chemistry, English, U.S. history, world history, music theory, and studio art. Courses in construction and business, and NJROTC are also available.

Dominion Robert Glass served as principal of the school in 1917.
