= Jackson, Georgia =

Jackson
- City
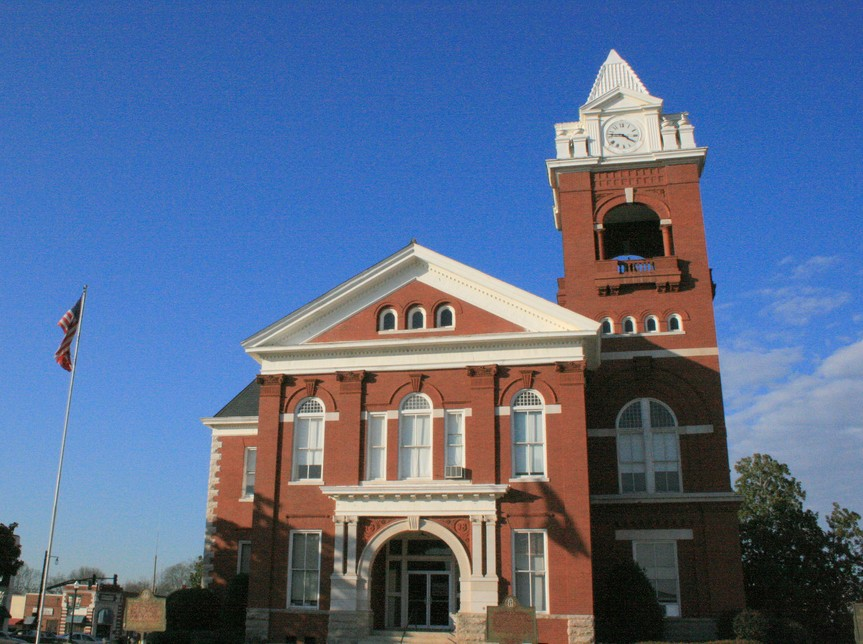
- Butts County Courthouse

- Logo

- Location in Butts County and the state of Georgia
- Coordinates: 33°17′37″N 83°57′45″W
- Country: United States
- State: Georgia
- County: Butts

Area
  - Total: 6.10 sq mi (15.79 km^{2})
  - Land: 6.08 sq mi (15.74 km^{2})
  - Water: 0.015 sq mi (0.04 km^{2})
- Elevation: 705 ft (215 m)

Population (2020)
  - Total: 5,557
  - Density: 914.2/sq mi (352.98/km^{2})
- Time zone: UTC-5 (Eastern (EST))
  - Summer (DST): UTC-4 (EDT)
- ZIP code: 30233
- Area code: 770
- FIPS code: 13-41596
- GNIS feature ID: 0332079
- Website: www.cityofjacksonga.com

Jackson is a city in and the county seat of Butts County, Georgia, United States. Its population was 5,045 in 2010, up from 3,934 at the 2000 census. In 2020, its population was 5,557. The community was named after the Governor James Jackson.

== History ==
Founded in 1826, Jackson began as a 303-acre (1.23 km^{2}) plot purchased for the purpose of starting the town. The plot was divided into squares and each square into lots. The first buyer of a lot in the new town was John D. Swift of Newton County, Georgia. During the Civil War, much of Jackson was razed by the army of General William T. Sherman during his March to the Sea. After the war, Jackson, like much of the South, struggled economically for decades. Jackson remained little more than a small village until the arrival of the railroads in the latter half of the 19th century. On May 5, 1882, the first train arrived in Jackson, heralding a new era in the transportation of people and goods.

During the 20th century, Jackson grew and industrial textile mills became the largest employer of local citizens. The arrival of Interstate 75 just a few miles to the southwest of the city gave citizens quick access to Atlanta and Macon. The numerous schools throughout the county consolidated into one central school system located in Jackson, and the schools desegregated in 1968. In the 1970s, Jackson slowly became a bedroom community. City taxes were also abolished in the 1970s.

== Geography ==
Jackson is located in the center of Butts County at 33°17′37″N 83°57′45″W. It is 46 miles (74 km) southeast of downtown Atlanta. The center of population of Georgia is located 9 miles (14 km) northeast of Jackson near the Butts County/Newton County line.

According to the United States Census Bureau, the city has a total area of 6.3 square miles (16.2 km^{2}), of which 6.2 square miles (16.1 km^{2}) is land and 0.04 square miles (0.1 km^{2}), or 0.5%, is water.

== Demographics ==
Historical population
Census	Pop.	Note	%±
1880	212		—
1890	922		334.9%
1900	1,487		61.3%
1910	1,862		25.2%
1920	2,027		8.9%
1930	1,776		−12.4%
1940	1,917		7.9%
1950	2,053		7.1%
1960	2,545		24.0%
1970	3,778		48.4%
1980	4,133		9.4%
1990	4,076		−1.4%
2000	3,934		−3.5%
2010	5,045		28.2%
2020	5,557		10.1%
U.S. Decennial Census

=== 2020 census ===
As of the 2020 census, Jackson had a population of 5,557. The median age was 37.7 years. 23.5% of residents were under the age of 18 and 18.2% of residents were 65 years of age or older. For every 100 females there were 88.1 males, and for every 100 females age 18 and over there were 83.7 males age 18 and over.

94.7% of residents lived in urban areas, while 5.3% lived in rural areas.

There were 2,017 households in Jackson, of which 34.3% had children under the age of 18 living in them. Of all households, 34.7% were married-couple households, 18.2% were households with a male householder and no spouse or partner present, and 40.2% were households with a female householder and no spouse or partner present. About 30.6% of all households were made up of individuals and 14.4% had someone living alone who was 65 years of age or older. There were 1,141 families residing in the city.

There were 2,189 housing units, of which 7.9% were vacant. The homeowner vacancy rate was 2.1% and the rental vacancy rate was 5.5%.

Jackson racial composition as of 2020
Race	Num.	Perc.
White (non-Hispanic)	2,721	48.97%
Black or African American (non-Hispanic)	2,399	43.17%
Native American	10	0.18%
Asian	25	0.45%
Pacific Islander	3	0.05%
Other/Mixed	211	3.8%
Hispanic or Latino	188	3.38%

== Government ==
Jackson is governed by an elected city council of five members, each representing a district of the city. The council is presided over by the mayor, who is elected at-large. All officials serve four year terms. The current mayor of Jackson is Carlos Duffey, who was elected in 2022.

== Media ==
Jackson is the home of WJGA-FM 92.1.

Jackson is a frequent backdrop for a number of television shows. Beginning in 2016, Jackson appeared in Stranger Things, representing the show's setting in the fictional town of Hawkins, Indiana in the early 1980s. Exterior filming locations included the downtown (with some buildings freshly painted for filming), a furniture store (standing in for a cinema exterior), and the Butts County Probate court.

The popularity of the show has attracted many fans to the town. Other shows which have been filmed in the area include The CW's The Originals.

== State prison ==
The Georgia Diagnostic and Classification State Prison of the Georgia Department of Corrections is a maximum security prison in unincorporated Butts County about 8 miles (13 km) southwest of Jackson. It is home to Georgia's death row and execution facility. The prison is also home to maximum security general population (non-death row).

== Education ==
The Butts County School District, grades pre-school to twelve, consists of three elementary schools, a middle school, and a high school. The district has 184 full-time teachers and over 3,370 students.

- Hampton L. Daughtry Elementary School
- Jackson Elementary School
- Stark Elementary School
- Henderson Middle School
- Jackson High School

== Notable people ==
- Neiron Ball, American football player
- Mac Collins, U.S. representative
- Mike Collins, U.S. representative
- Burt Jones, 13th lieutenant governor of Georgia
- Douglass Watson, actor, best known for his portrayal of Mac Cory on the soap opera Another World
