= 155th Georgia General Assembly =

Term of state legislature in US state of Georgia

←	154th	156th	→
- Great Seal of the State of Georgia

Overview
- Legislative body: Georgia General Assembly
- Meeting place: Georgia State Capitol

Senate
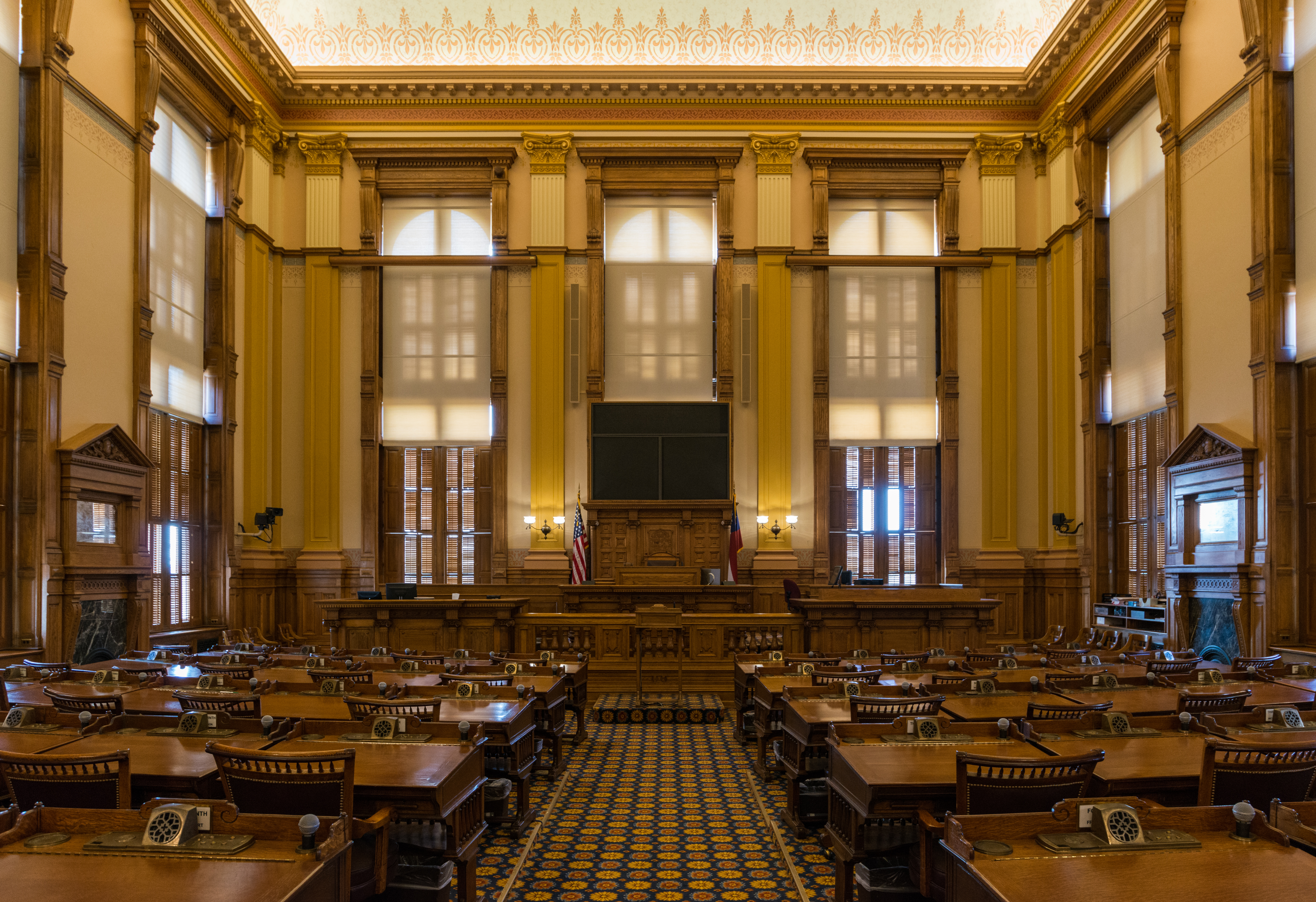
- Members: 56 (34 R, 21 D, 1 vacant)
- Georgia Lt. Governor and Senate President: Geoff Duncan (R)
- Party control: Republican Party

House of Representatives
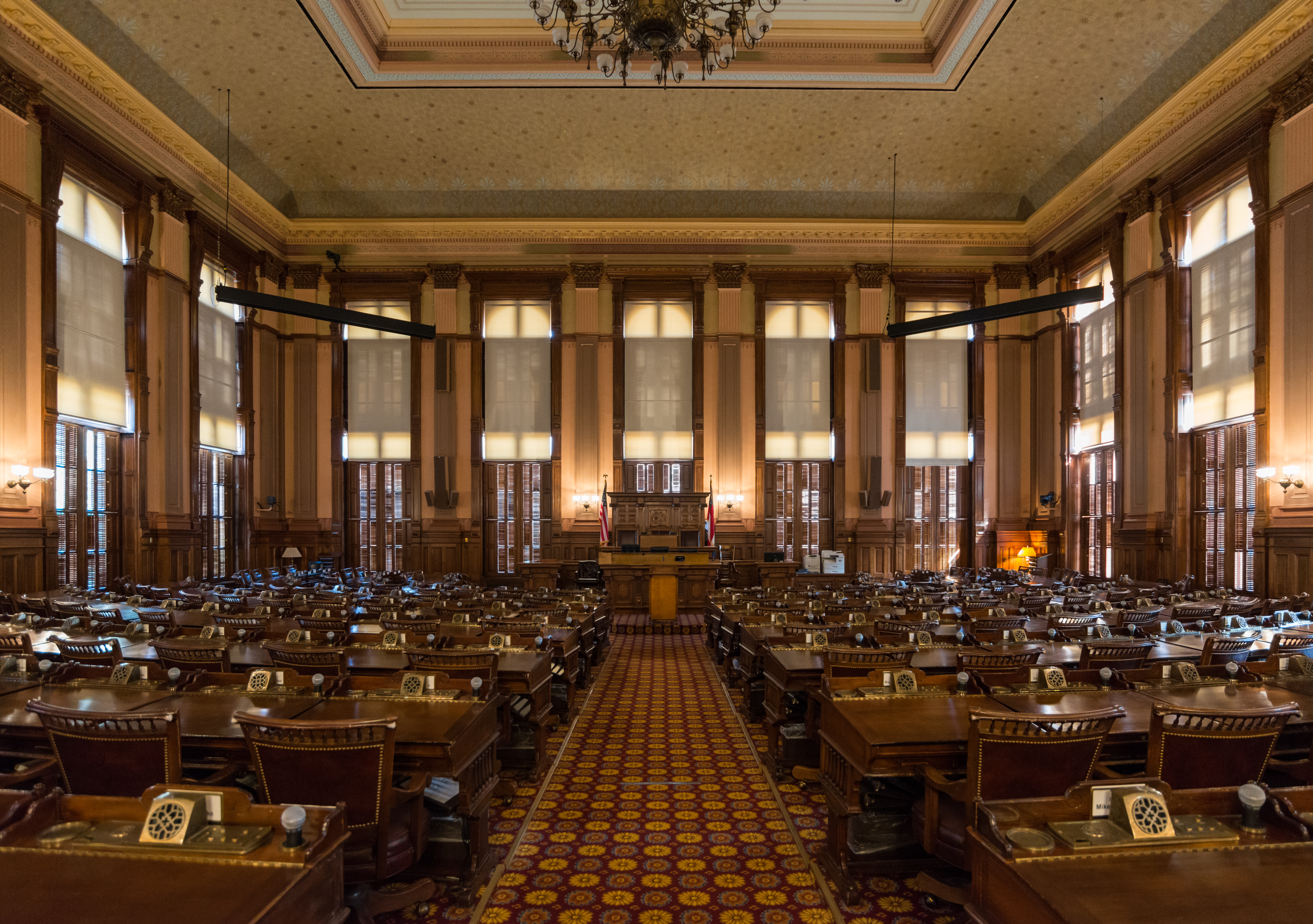
- Members: 180 (104 R, 75 D, 1 vacant)
- Speaker of the House: David Ralston (R)
- Party control: Republican Party

Sessions
- 1st: January 14, 2019 – April 2, 2019
- 2nd: January 13, 2020 – June 26, 2020

The 155th Georgia General Assembly convened its first session on January 14, 2019, at the Georgia State Capitol in Atlanta. The first session lasted for 40 legislative days in early 2019, and a second session began on January 13, 2020. The 155th Georgia General Assembly succeeds the 154th of 2017 and 2018, and precedes the 156th in 2021 and 2022.

The membership of the General Assembly was elected in the 2018 State Senate and State House elections.

== Party composition ==
=== Senate ===
Affiliation	Party (Shading indicates majority caucus)		Total	
Affiliation	Republican	Democratic	Total	Vacant
Beginning of 155th Assembly	35	21	56	0
December 22, 2019	34	21	55	1
Latest voting share	61.8%	38.2%		

=== House of Representatives ===
Affiliation	Party (Shading indicates majority caucus)		Total	
Affiliation	Republican	Democratic	Total	Vacant
End of previous General Assembly	116	62	178	2
Begin (January 14, 2019)	105	75	180	0
February 8, 2019 (Note: Judge removed Rep. Chris Erwin from office citing election irregularities. New election held on April 9, 2019.)	104	75	179	1
April 26, 2019 (Note: Chris Erwin won redo election, filled vacant seat on April 26, 2019.)	105	75	180	0
September 10, 2020 (Note: Rep. Pam Stephenson resigned September 10, 2020.)	105	74	179	1
Final voting share	58.7%	41.3%		
Beginning of the next General Assembly	103	76	179	1

== Officers ==
=== Senate ===
Office	Officeholder	Party
Lt. Governor and Senate President	Geoff Duncan	Republican
President pro tempore	Butch Miller	Republican
Majority Leader	Mike Dugan	Republican
Majority Whip	Steve Gooch	Republican
Majority Caucus Chairman	John Kennedy	Republican
Majority Caucus Vice-Chairman	Larry Walker	Republican
Majority Caucus Secretary	John Wilkinson	Republican
Minority Leader	Steve Henson	Democratic
Minority Whip	Harold Jones II	Democratic
Minority Caucus Chairwoman	Gloria Butler	Democratic
Minority Caucus Vice-Chairman	Emanuel Jones	Democratic
Minority Caucus Secretary	Nan Orrock	Democratic

=== House of Representatives ===
Office	Representative	Party
Speaker of the House	David Ralston	Republican
Speaker pro tempore	Jan Jones	Republican
Majority Leader	Jon Burns	Republican
Majority Whip	Trey Kelley	Republican
Majority Caucus Chairman	Matt Hatchett	Republican
Majority Caucus Vice-Chairman	Micah Gravley	Republican
Majority Caucus Secretary/Treasurer	Bruce Williamson	Republican
Majority Caucus Chief Deputy Whip	Mark Newton	Republican
Minority Leader	Bob Trammell	Democratic
Minority Whip	William Boddie	Democratic
Minority Caucus Chairman	James Beverly	Democratic
Minority Caucus Vice-Chairwoman	Erica Thomas	Democratic
Minority Caucus Secretary	Pat Gardner	Democratic
Minority Caucus Treasurer	Kimberly Alexander	Democratic
Minority Caucus Chief Deputy Whip	Dar'shun Kendrick	Democratic

== Members of the State Senate ==
The following is a list of members of the Georgia State Senate.

District	District	Senator	Party	Residence
1	1	Ben Watson	Republican	Savannah
2	2	Lester G. Jackson	Democratic	Savannah
3	3	William T. Ligon Jr.	Republican	Brunswick
4	4	Billy Hickman	Republican	Reidsville
5	5	Sheikh Rahman	Democratic	Tucker
6	6	Jen Jordan	Democratic	Atlanta
7	7	Tyler Harper	Republican	Ocilla
8	8	Ellis Black	Republican	Valdosta
9	9	P.K. Martin IV	Republican	Lawrenceville
10	10	Emanuel Jones	Democratic	Decatur
11	11	Dean Burke	Republican	Bainbridge
12	12	Freddie Powell Sims	Democratic	Dawson
13	13	Carden Summers	Republican	Americus
14	14	Bruce Thompson	Republican	White
15	15	Ed Harbison	Democratic	Columbus
16	16	Marty Harbin	Republican	Tyrone
17	17	Brian Strickland	Republican	McDonough
18	18	John F. Kennedy	Republican	Macon
19	19	Blake Tillery	Republican	Vidalia
20	20	Larry Walker III	Republican	Perry
21	21	Brandon Beach	Republican	Alpharetta
22	22	Harold V. Jones II	Democratic	Augusta
23	23	Jesse Stone	Republican	Waynesboro
24	24	Lee Anderson	Republican	Grovetown
25	25	Burt Jones	Republican	Jackson
26	26	David Lucas	Democratic	Macon
27	27	Greg Dolezal	Republican	Cumming
28	28	Matt Brass	Republican	Newnan
29	29	Randy Robertson	Republican	Columbus
30	30	Mike Dugan	Republican	Carrollton
31	31	Bill Heath	Republican	Bremen
32	32	Kay Kirkpatrick	Republican	Marietta
33	33	Michael "Doc" Rhett	Democratic	Marietta
34	34	Valencia Seay	Democratic	Riverdale
35	35	Donzella James	Democratic	Atlanta
36	36	Nan Orrock	Democratic	Atlanta
37	37	Lindsey Tippins	Republican	Marietta
38	38	Horacena Tate	Democratic	Atlanta
39	39	Nikema Williams	Democratic	Atlanta
40	40	Sally Harrell	Democratic	Atlanta
41	41	Steve Henson	Democratic	Tucker
42	42	Elena Parent	Democratic	Atlanta
43	43	Tonya Anderson	Democratic	Lithonia
44	44	Gail Davenport	Democratic	Jonesboro
45	45	Renee Unterman	Republican	Buford
46	46	Bill Cowsert	Republican	Athens
47	47	Frank Ginn	Republican	Danielsville
48	48	Zahra Karinshak	Democratic	Duluth
49	49	Butch Miller	Republican	Gainesville
50	50	John Wilkinson	Republican	Toccoa
51	51	Steve Gooch	Republican	Dahlonega
52	52	Chuck Hufstetler	Republican	Rome
53	53	Jeff Mullis	Republican	Chickamauga
54	54	Chuck Payne	Republican	Dalton
55	55	Gloria Butler	Democratic	Stone Mountain
56	56	John Albers	Republican	Roswell

== Members of the House of Representatives ==
The following is a list of members of the Georgia House of Representatives.

District	Representative	Party	Residence
1	Colton Moore	Republican	Trenton
2	Steve Tarvin	Republican	Chickamauga
3	Dewayne Hill	Republican	Ringgold
4	Kasey Carpenter	Republican	Dalton
5	Matt Barton	Republican	Calhoun
6	Jason Ridley	Republican	Cohutta
7	David Ralston, Speaker	Republican	Blue Ridge
8	Matt Gurtler	Republican	Blairsville
9	Kevin Tanner	Republican	Dawsonville
10	Terry Rogers	Republican	Clarkesville
11	Rick Jasperse	Republican	Jasper
12	Eddie Lumsden	Republican	Armuchee
13	Katie M. Dempsey	Republican	Rome
14	Mitchell Scoggins	Republican	Cartersville
15	Matthew Gambill	Republican	Cartersville
16	Trey Kelley	Republican	Cedartown
17	Martin Momtahan	Republican	Dallas
18	Kevin Cooke	Republican	Carrollton
19	Joseph Gullett	Republican	Dallas
20	Michael Caldwell	Republican	Woodstock
21	Scot Turner	Republican	Holly Springs
22	Wes Cantrell	Republican	Canton
23	Mandi L. Ballinger	Republican	Canton
24	Sheri Gilligan	Republican	Cumming
25	Todd Jones	Republican	Suwanee
26	Marc Morris	Republican	Cumming
27	Lee Hawkins	Republican	Gainesville
28	Chris Erwin	Republican	
29	Matt Dubnik	Republican	Gainesville
30	Emory Dunahoo	Republican	Gainesville
31	Tommy Benton	Republican	Jefferson
32	Alan Powell	Republican	Hartwell
33	Rob Leverett	Republican	Elberton
34	Bert Reeves	Republican	Kennesaw
35	Ed Setzler	Republican	Acworth
36	Ginny Ehrhart	Republican	Powder Springs
37	Mary Frances Williams	Democratic	Marietta
38	David Wilkerson	Democratic	Austell
39	Erica Thomas	Democratic	Austell
40	Erick E. Allen	Democratic	Smyrna
41	Michael Smith	Democratic	Marietta
42	Teri Anulewicz	Democratic	Smyrna
43	Sharon Cooper	Republican	Marietta
44	Don Parsons	Republican	Marietta
45	Matt Dollar	Republican	Marietta
46	John Carson	Republican	Marietta
47	Jan Jones	Republican	Milton
48	Mary Robichaux	Democratic	Roswell
49	Chuck Martin	Republican	Alpharetta
50	Angelika Kausche	Democratic	Johns Creek
51	Josh McLaurin	Democratic	Sandy Springs
52	Deborah Silcox	Republican	Atlanta
53	Sheila Jones	Democratic	Smyrna
54	Betsy Holland	Democratic	Atlanta
55	Marie Metze	Democratic	Atlanta
56	"Able" Mable Thomas	Democratic	Atlanta
57	Pat Gardner	Democratic	Atlanta
58	Park Cannon	Democratic	Atlanta
59	David Dreyer	Democratic	Atlanta
60	Kim Schofield	Democratic	Atlanta
61	Roger B. Bruce	Democratic	Atlanta
62	William Boddie	Democratic	Atlanta
63	Debra Bazemore	Democratic	Fayetteville
64	Derrick Jackson	Democratic	Tyrone
65	Sharon Beasley-Teague	Democratic	Red Oak
66	Kimberly Alexander	Democratic	Hiram
67	Micah Gravley	Republican	Douglasville
68	J. Collins	Republican	Villa Rica
69	Randy Nix	Republican	LaGrange
70	Lynn Ratigan Smith	Republican	Newnan
71	Philip Singleton	Republican	Newnan
72	Josh Bonner	Republican	Peachtree City
73	Karen Mathiak	Republican	Griffin
74	Valencia Stovall	Democratic	Ellenwood
75	Mike Glanton	Democratic	Jonesboro
76	Sandra Scott	Democratic	Rex
77	Rhonda Burnough	Democratic	Riverdale
78	Demetrius Douglas	Democratic	Stockbridge
79	Mike Wilensky	Democratic	Dunwoody
80	Matthew Wilson	Democratic	Brookhaven
81	Scott Holcomb	Democratic	Atlanta
82	Mary Margaret Oliver	Democratic	Decatur
83	Becky Evans	Democratic	Atlanta
84	Renitta Shannon	Democratic	Atlanta
85	Karla Drenner	Democratic	Avondale Estates
86	Michele D. Henson	Democratic	Stone Mountain
87	Viola Davis	Democratic	Stone Mountain
88	Billy Mitchell	Democratic	Stone Mountain
89	Bee Nguyen	Democratic	Atlanta
90	Pam Stephenson	Democratic	Decatur
91	Vernon Jones	Democratic	Lithonia
92	Doreen Carter	Democratic	Lithonia
93	Dar'shun Kendrick	Democratic	Lithonia
94	Karen Bennett	Democratic	Stone Mountain
95	Beth Moore	Democratic	Peachtree Corners
96	Pedro Marin	Democratic	Duluth
97	Brooks Coleman	Republican	Duluth
98	David Clark	Republican	Buford
99	Brenda Lopez	Democratic	Norcross
100	Dewey McClain	Democratic	Lilburn
101	Sam Park	Democratic	Lawrenceville
102	Gregg Kennard	Democratic	Lawrenceville
103	Timothy Barr	Republican	Lawrenceville
104	Chuck Efstration	Republican	Dacula
105	Donna McLeod	Democratic	Lawrenceville
106	Brett Harrell	Republican	Snellville
107	Shelly Hutchinson	Democratic	Snellville
108	Jasmine Clark	Democratic	Tucker
109	Dale Rutledge	Republican	McDonough
110	Andrew Welch	Republican	McDonough
111	El-Mahdi Holly	Democratic	Stockbridge
112	Dave Belton	Republican	Social Circle
113	Pam Dickerson	Democratic	Conyers
114	Tom Kirby	Republican	Loganville
115	Bruce Williamson	Republican	Monroe
116	Terry Lamar England	Republican	Auburn
117	Houston Gaines	Republican	Athens
118	Spencer Frye	Democratic	Athens
119	Marcus A. Wiedower	Republican	Watkinsville
120	Trey Rhodes	Republican	Greensboro
121	Barry Fleming	Republican	Harlem
122	Jodi Lott	Republican	Evans
123	Mark Newton	Republican	Augusta
124	Henry "Wayne" Howard	Democratic	Augusta
125	Sheila Clark Nelson	Democratic	Augusta
126	Gloria Frazier	Democratic	Hephzibah
127	Brian Prince	Democratic	Augusta
128	Mack Jackson	Democratic	Sandersville
129	Susan Holmes	Republican	Monticello
130	David Knight	Republican	Griffin
131	Ken Pullin	Republican	Zebulon
132	Bob Trammell	Democratic	LaGrange
133	Vance Smith	Republican	Pine Mountain
134	Richard H. Smith	Republican	Columbus
135	Calvin Smyre	Democratic	Columbus
136	Carolyn Hugley	Democratic	Columbus
137	Debbie Buckner	Democratic	Junction City
138	Mike Cheokas	Republican	Americus
139	Patty Bentley	Democratic	Reynolds
140	Robert Dickey	Republican	Musella
141	Allen Peake	Republican	Macon
142	Miriam Paris	Democratic	Macon
143	James Beverly	Democratic	Macon
144	Danny Mathis	Republican	Cochran
145	Rick Williams	Republican	Milledgeville
146	Shaw Blackmon	Republican	Bonaire
147	Heath Clark	Republican	Warner Robins
148	Noel Williams, Jr.	Republican	Cordele
149	Jimmy Pruett	Republican	Eastman
150	Matt Hatchett	Republican	Dublin
151	Gerald E. Greene	Republican	Cuthbert
152	Bill Yearta	Republican	Albany
153	CaMia Hopson	Democratic	Albany
154	Winfred J. Dukes	Democratic	Albany
155	Clay Pirkle	Republican	Ocilla
156	Greg Morris	Republican	Vidalia
157	Bill Werkheiser	Republican	Glennville
158	Larry "Butch" Parrish	Republican	Swainsboro
159	Jon G. Burns	Republican	Newington
160	Jan Tankersley	Republican	Brooklet
161	Bill Hitchens	Republican	Rincon
162	Carl Wayne Gilliard	Democratic	Garden City
163	J. Craig Gordon	Democratic	Savannah
164	Ron Stephens	Republican	Savannah
165	Mickey Stephens	Democratic	Savannah
166	Jesse Petrea	Republican	Savannah
167	Jeff Jones	Republican	Brunswick
168	Al Williams	Democratic	Midway
169	Dominic LaRiccia	Republican	Ambrose
170	Penny Houston	Republican	Nashville
171	Joe Campbell	Republican	Camilla
172	Sam Watson	Republican	Moultrie
173	Darlene K. Taylor	Republican	Thomasville
174	John Corbett	Republican	Valdosta
175	John LaHood	Republican	Valdosta
176	Jason Shaw	Republican	Lakeland
177	Dexter Sharper	Democratic	Valdosta
178	Steven Meeks	Republican	Screven
179	Don Hogan	Republican	Brunswick
180	Steven Sainz	Republican	Woodbine

== See also ==
- List of Georgia state legislatures
