= 154th Georgia General Assembly =

Term of state legislature in US state of Georgia

←	153rd	155th	→
- Great Seal of the State of Georgia

Overview
- Legislative body: Georgia General Assembly
- Meeting place: Georgia State Capitol

Senate
- Members: 56 (38 R, 18 D)
- President of the Senate: Casey Cagle (R)
- Party control: Republican Party

House of Representatives
- Members: 180 (118 R, 61 D, 1 vacant)
- Speaker of the House: David Ralston (R)
- Party control: Republican Party

Sessions
- 1st: January 9, 2017 – March 30, 2017
- 2nd: January 8, 2018 – March 29, 2018

The 154th Georgia General Assembly convened its first session on January 9, 2017, at the Georgia State Capitol in Atlanta. Its second session was January 8 through March 29, 2018. The 154th Georgia General Assembly preceded the 153rd of 2015 and 2016, and succeeded by the 155th in 2019 and 2020.

== Party composition ==
=== Senate ===
Affiliation	Members
Republican Party	37
Democratic Party	18
Independent	0
Vacancies	1
Total	56

=== House of Representatives ===
Affiliation	Members
Republican Party	116
Democratic Party	62
Independent	0
Vacancies	2
Total	180

== Officers ==
=== Senate ===
Position	Name	District	Party
President	Casey Cagle	n/a	Republican
President Pro Tempore	David Shafer	48	Republican

==== Majority leadership ====
Position	Name	District
Senate Majority Leader	Bill Cowsert	46
Majority Whip	Steve Gooch	51
Majority Caucus Chairman	John Kennedy	18
Majority Caucus Vice Chairman	Hunter Hill	6
Majority Caucus Secretary	John Wilkinson	50

==== Minority leadership ====
Position	Name	District
Senate Minority Leader	Steve Henson	41
Minority Whip	Vincent Fort	39
Minority Caucus Chairman	Horacena Tate	38
Minority Caucus Vice Chairman	Valencia Seay	34
Minority Caucus Secretary	Nan Orrock	36

=== House of Representatives ===
Position	Name	District	Party
Speaker of the House	David Ralston	7	Republican
Speaker Pro Tempore	Jan Jones	47	Republican

==== Majority leadership ====
Position	Name	District
House Majority Leader	Jon G. Burns	159
Majority Whip	Christian Coomer	14
Majority Caucus Chairman	Matt Hatchett	150
Majority Caucus Vice-Chairman	Sam Teasley	37
Majority Caucus Sec./Treas.	Bruce Williamson	115

==== Minority leadership ====
Position	Name	District
House Minority Leader	Bob Trammell	132
Minority Whip	Carolyn Hugley	136
Minority Caucus Chairman	James Beverly	143
Minority Caucus Vice-Chairman	Erica Thomas	39
Minority Caucus Secretary	Pat Gardner	57
Minority Caucus Treasurer	Kimberly Alexander	66

== Members of the State Senate ==
The following is a list of members of the Georgia State Senate.

↓
37	19
Republican	Democratic

District	Senator	Party	Residence
1	Ben Watson	Republican	Savannah
2	Lester Jackson	Democratic	Savannah
3	William T. Ligon, Jr.	Republican	Brunswick
4	Jack Hill	Republican	Reidsville
5	Curt Thompson	Democratic	Tucker
6	Jen Jordan	Democratic	Atlanta
7	Tyler Harper	Republican	Ocilla
8	Ellis Black	Republican	Valdosta
9	P.K. Martin	Republican	Snellville
10	Emanuel Jones	Democratic	Decatur
11	Dean Burke	Republican	Bainbridge
12	Freddie Powell Sims	Democratic	Dawson
13	Greg Kirk	Republican	Tifton
14	Bruce Thompson	Republican	Cassville
15	Ed Harbison	Democratic	Columbus
16	Marty Harbin	Republican	Tyrone
17	Brian Strickland	Republican	McDonough
18	John Kennedy	Republican	Macon
19	Blake Tillery	Republican	Lyons
20	Larry Walker	Republican	Perry
21	Brandon Beach	Republican	Alpharetta
22	Harold V. Jones II	Democratic	Augusta
23	Jesse Stone	Republican	Waynesboro
24	Lee Anderson	Republican	Appling
25	Burt Jones	Republican	Jackson
26	David Lucas	Democratic	Macon
27	Michael Williams	Republican	Cumming
28	Matt Brass	Republican	Newnan
29	Joshua McKoon	Republican	Columbus
30	Mike Dugan	Republican	Carrollton
31	Bill Heath	Republican	Bremen
32	Kay Kirkpatrick	Republican	Marietta
33	Michael 'Doc' Rhett	Democratic	Marietta
34	Valencia Seay	Democratic	Riverdale
35	Donzella James	Democratic	College Park
36	Nan Orrock	Democratic	Atlanta
37	Lindsey Tippins	Republican	Marietta
38	Horacena Tate	Democratic	Atlanta
39	Nikema Williams	Democratic	Atlanta
40	Fran Millar	Republican	Atlanta
41	Steve Henson	Democratic	Tucker
42	Elena Parent	Democratic	Decatur
43	Tonya Anderson	Democratic	Decatur
44	Gail Davenport	Democratic	Jonesboro
45	Renee Unterman	Republican	Buford
46	Bill Cowsert	Republican	Athens
47	Frank Ginn	Republican	Danielsville
48	David Shafer	Republican	Duluth
49	Butch Miller	Republican	Gainesville
50	John Wilkinson	Republican	Toccoa
51	Steve Gooch	Republican	Dahlonega
52	Chuck Hufstetler	Republican	Rome
53	Jeff Mullis	Republican	Chickamauga
54	Chuck Payne	Republican	Dalton
55	Gloria S. Butler	Democratic	Stone Mountain
56	John Albers	Republican	Roswell

== Members of the House of Representatives ==
↓
116	64
Republican	Democratic

District	Representative	Party	Residence
1	John Deffenbaugh	Republican	Lookout Mountain
2	Steve Tarvin	Republican	LaFayette
3	Dewayne Hill	Republican	Ringgold
4	Kasey Carpenter	Republican	Dalton
5	John D. Meadows, III	Republican	Calhoun
6	Jason Ridley	Republican	Cohutta
7	David Ralston	Republican	Blue Ridge
8	Matt Gurtler	Republican	Blairsville
9	Kevin Tanner	Republican	Dawsonville
10	Terry Rogers	Republican	Clarkesville
11	Rick Jasperse	Republican	Jasper
12	Eddie Lumsden	Republican	Armuchee
13	Katie M. Dempsey	Republican	Rome
14	Christian Coomer	Republican	Cartersville
15	Paul Battles	Republican	Cartersville
16	Trey Kelley	Republican	Cedartown
17	Howard R. Maxwell	Republican	Dallas
18	Kevin Cooke	Republican	Carrollton
19	Paulette Rakestraw	Republican	Hiram
20	Michael Caldwell	Republican	Woodstock
21	Scot Turner	Republican	Holly Springs
22	Wes Cantrell	Republican	Canton
23	Mandi L. Ballinger	Republican	Canton
24	Sheri Gilligan	Republican	Cumming
25	Todd Jones	Republican	Suwanee
26	Marc Morris	Republican	Cumming
27	Lee Hawkins	Republican	Gainesville
28	Dan Gasaway	Republican	Homer
29	Matt Dubnik	Republican	Gainesville
30	Emory Dunahoo	Republican	Gainesville
31	Tommy Benton	Republican	Jefferson
32	Alan Powell	Republican	Hartwell
33	Tom McCall	Republican	Elberton
34	Bert Reeves	Republican	Kennesaw
35	Ed Setzler	Republican	Acworth
36	Earl Ehrhart	Republican	Powder Springs
37	Sam Teasley	Republican	Marietta
38	David Wilkerson	Democratic	Austell
39	Erica Thomas	Democratic	Austell
40	Rich Golick	Republican	Smyrna
41	Michael Smith	Democratic	Marietta
42	Teri Anulewicz	Democratic	Smyrna
43	Sharon Cooper	Republican	Marietta
44	Don Parsons	Republican	Marietta
45	Matt Dollar	Republican	Marietta
46	John Carson	Republican	Marietta
47	Jan Jones	Republican	Milton
48	Betty Price	Republican	Roswell
49	Chuck Martin	Republican	Alpharetta
50	Brad Raffensperger	Republican	Johns Creek
51	Wendell Willard	Republican	Sandy Springs
52	Deborah Silcox	Republican	Atlanta
53	Sheila Jones	Democratic	Smyrna
54	Beth Beskin	Republican	Atlanta
55	Marie Metze	Democratic	Atlanta
56	"Able" Mable Thomas	Democratic	Atlanta
57	Pat Gardner	Democratic	Atlanta
58	Park Cannon	Democratic	Atlanta
59	David Dreyer	Democratic	Atlanta
60	Keisha Waites	Democratic	Atlanta
61	Roger B. Bruce	Democratic	Atlanta
62	William Boddie	Democratic	Atlanta
63	Debra Bazemore	Democratic	Fayetteville
64	Derrick Jackson	Democratic	Tyrone
65	Sharon Beasley-Teague	Democratic	Red Oak
66	Kimberly Alexander	Democratic	Hiram
67	Micah Gravley	Republican	Douglasville
68	J. Collins	Republican	Carrollton
69	Randy Nix	Republican	LaGrange
70	Lynn Ratigan Smith	Republican	Newnan
71	David Stover	Republican	Newnan
72	Josh Bonner	Republican	Peachtree City
73	Karen Mathiak	Republican	Griffin
74	Valencia Stovall	Democratic	Ellenwood
75	Mike Glanton	Democratic	Jonesboro
76	Sandra Scott	Democratic	Rex
77	Rhonda Burnough	Democratic	Riverdale
78	Demetrius Douglas	Democratic	Stockbridge
79	Tom Taylor	Republican	Dunwoody
80	Meagan Hanson	Republican	Atlanta
81	Scott Holcomb	Democratic	Atlanta
82	Mary Margaret Oliver	Democratic	Decatur
83	Howard Mosby	Democratic	Atlanta
84	Renitta Shannon	Democratic	Atlanta
85	Karla Drenner	Democratic	Avondale Estates
86	Michele D. Henson	Democratic	Stone Mountain
87	Earnest "Coach" Williams	Democratic	Avondale Estates
88	Billy Mitchell	Democratic	Stone Mountain
89	Bee Nguyen	Democratic	Atlanta
90	Pam Stephenson	Democratic	Decatur
91	Vernon Jones	Democratic	Lithonia
92	Doreen Carter	Democratic	Lithonia
93	Dar'shun Kendrick	Democratic	Lithonia
94	Karen Bennett	Democratic	Stone Mountain
95	Scott Hilton	Republican	Norcross
96	Pedro Marin	Democratic	Duluth
97	Brooks Coleman	Republican	Duluth
98	David Clark	Republican	Buford
99	Brenda Lopez	Democratic	Norcross
100	Dewey McClain	Democratic	Lilburn
101	Sam Park	Democratic	Lawrenceville
102	Buzz Brockway	Republican	Lawrenceville
103	Timothy Barr	Republican	Lawrenceville
104	Chuck Efstration	Republican	Dacula
105	Joyce Chandler	Republican	Snellville
106	Brett Harrell	Republican	Snellville
107	David S. Casas	Republican	Lilburn
108	Clay Cox	Republican	Lilburn
109	Dale Rutledge	Republican	McDonough
110	Andrew Welch	Republican	McDonough
111	Geoff Cauble	Republican	Henry County
112	Dave Belton	Republican	Social Circle
113	Pam Dickerson	Democratic	Conyers
114	Tom Kirby	Republican	Loganville
115	Bruce Williamson	Republican	Monroe
116	Terry Lamar England	Republican	Auburn
117	Deborah Gonzalez	Democratic	Athens
118	Spencer Frye	Democratic	Athens
119	Jonathan Wallace	Democratic	Watkinsville
120	Trey Rhodes	Republican	Greensboro
121	Barry Fleming	Republican	Harlem
122	Jodi Lott	Republican	Evans
123	Mark Newton	Republican	Augusta
124	Henry "Wayne" Howard	Democratic	Augusta
125	Sheila Clark Nelson	Democratic	Augusta
126	Gloria Frazier	Democratic	Hephzibah
127	Brian Prince	Democratic	Augusta
128	Mack Jackson	Democratic	Sandersville
129	Susan Holmes	Republican	Monticello
130	David Knight	Republican	Griffin
131	Johnnie Caldwell, Jr.	Republican	Thomaston
132	Bob Trammell	Democratic	LaGrange
133	John David Pezold	Republican	Fortson
134	Richard H. Smith	Republican	Columbus
135	Calvin Smyre	Democratic	Columbus
136	Carolyn Hugley	Democratic	Columbus
137	Debbie Buckner	Democratic	Junction City
138	Bill McGowan	Republican	Americus
139	Patty Bentley	Democratic	Reynolds
140	Robert Dickey	Republican	Musella
141	Allen Peake	Republican	Macon
142	Miriam Paris	Democratic	Macon
143	James Beverly	Democratic	Macon
144	Bubber Epps	Republican	Dry Branch
145	Rick Williams	Republican	Milledgeville
146	Shaw Blackmon	Republican	Bonaire
147	Heath Clark	Republican	Warner Robins
148	Buddy Harden	Republican	Cordele
149	Jimmy Pruett	Republican	Eastman
150	Matt Hatchett	Republican	Dublin
151	Gerald E. Greene	Republican	Cuthbert
152	Ed Rynders	Republican	Albany
153	Darrel Bush Ealum	Democratic	Albany
154	Winfred J. Dukes	Democratic	Albany
155	Clay Pirkle	Republican	Ocilla
156	Greg Morris	Republican	Vidalia
157	Bill Werkheiser	Republican	Glennville
158	Larry "Butch" Parrish	Republican	Swainsboro
159	Jon G. Burns	Republican	Newington
160	Jan Tankersley	Republican	Brooklet
161	Bill Hitchens	Republican	Rincon
162	Carl Wayne Gilliard	Democratic	Garden City
163	J. Craig Gordon	Democratic	Savannah
164	Ron Stephens	Republican	Savannah
165	Mickey Stephens	Democratic	Savannah
166	Jesse Petrea	Republican	Savannah
167	Jeff Jones	Republican	Brunswick
168	Al Williams	Democratic	Midway
169	Dominic LaRiccia	Republican	Ambrose
170	Penny Houston	Republican	Nashville
171	Jay Powell	Republican	Camilla
172	Sam Watson	Republican	Moultrie
173	Darlene K. Taylor	Republican	Thomasville
174	John Corbett	Republican	Valdosta
175	John LaHood	Republican	Valdosta
176	Jason Shaw	Republican	Lakeland
177	Dexter Sharper	Democratic	Valdosta
178	Chad Nimmer	Republican	Blackshear
179	Don Hogan	Republican	Brunswick
180	Jason Spencer	Republican	Woodbine

== See also ==
- List of Georgia state legislatures
