= 156th Georgia General Assembly =

Term of state legislature in US state of Georgia

←	155th	157th	→
- Great Seal of the State of Georgia

Overview
- Legislative body: Georgia General Assembly
- Meeting place: Georgia State Capitol

Senate
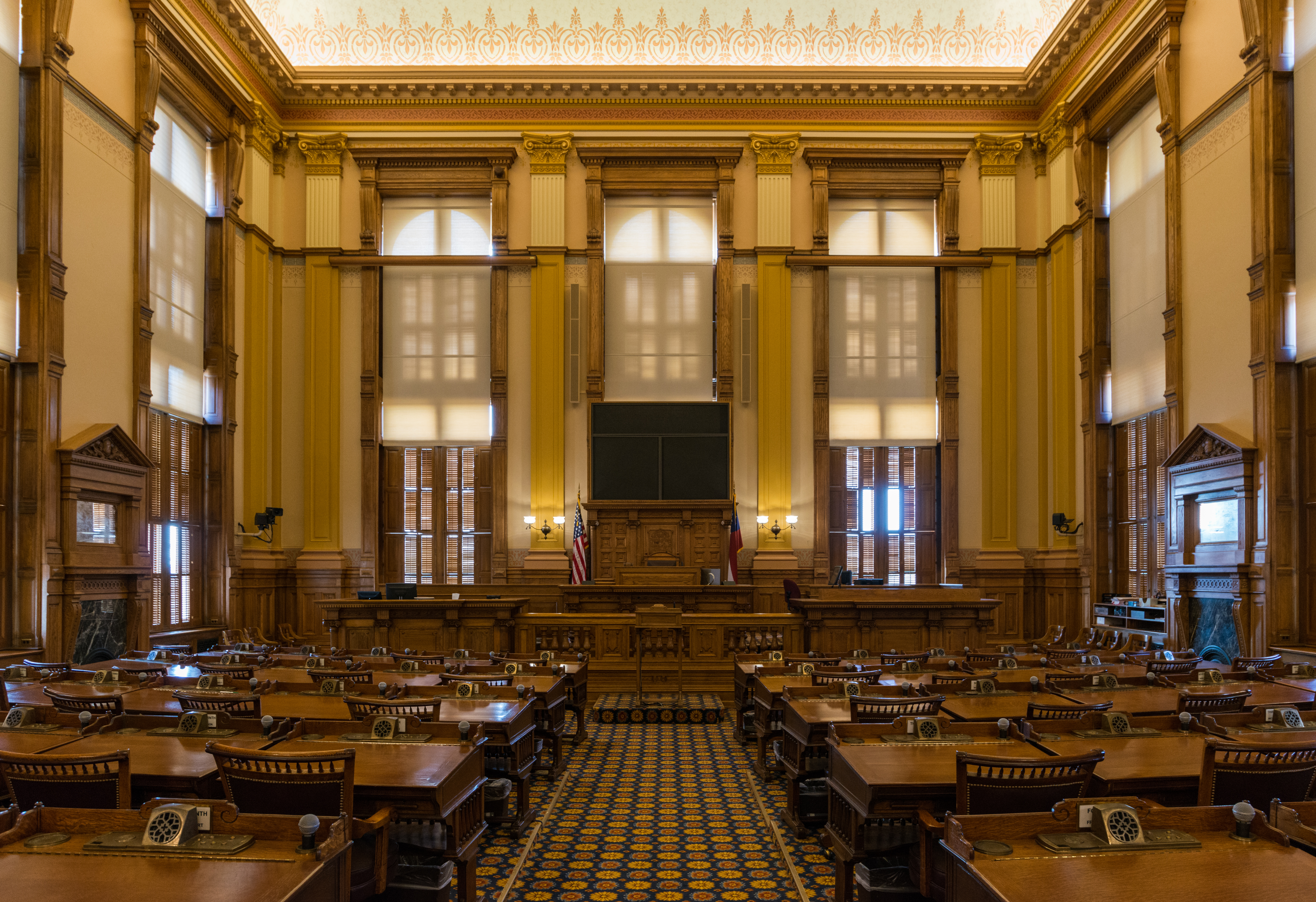
- Members: 56 (34 R, 22 D)
- Senate President: Geoff Duncan (R)
- Party control: Republican Party

House of Representatives
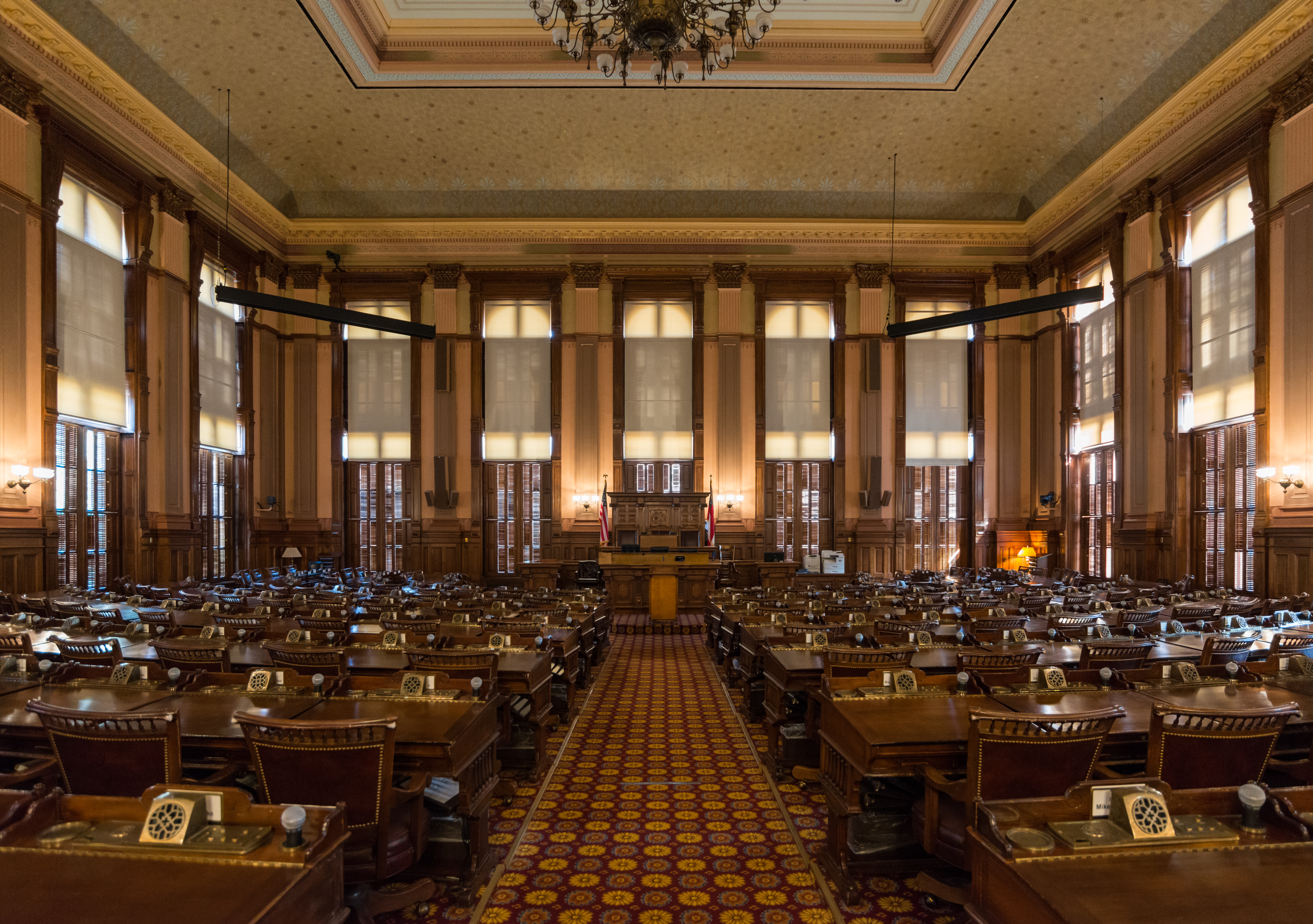
- Members: 180 (103 R, 76 D, 1 vacant)
- Speaker of the House: David Ralston (R)
- Party control: Republican Party

Sessions
- 1st: January 11, 2021 – March 31, 2021
- 2nd: January 10, 2022 – April 4, 2022

The 156th Georgia General Assembly convened its first session on January 11, 2021, at the Georgia State Capitol in Atlanta. The second session began on January 10, 2022 and ended April 4, 2022.

The membership of the General Assembly was elected in the 2020 State Senate and State House elections.

== Party composition ==
=== Senate ===
Affiliation	Party (Shading indicates majority caucus)		Total	
Affiliation	Republican	Democratic	Total	Vacant
End of 155th General Assembly	35	21	56	0
Beginning of 156th General Assembly	34	22	56	0
Latest voting share	60.7%	39.3%		

=== House of Representatives ===
Affiliation	Party (Shading indicates majority caucus)		Total	
Affiliation	Republican	Democratic	Total	Vacant
End of 155th General Assembly	105	74	179	1 (Note: Rep. Pam Stephenson resigned on September 10, 2020, and remained on the ballot in the 2020 general election unopposed. The seat remained vacant until Rep. Angela Moore was sworn in on March 16th, 2021, having won a special election primary runoff on March 9th.)
Beginning of 156th General Assembly	103	76	179	1
Latest voting share	57.5%	42.5%		

== Members of the State Senate ==
The following is a list of members of the Georgia State Senate.

District	Senator	Party	Residence
1	Ben Watson	Republican	Savannah
2	Lester G. Jackson	Democratic	Savannah
3	Sheila McNeill	Republican	
4	Billy Hickman	Republican	Reidsville
5	Sheikh Rahman	Democratic	Tucker
6	Jen Jordan	Democratic	Atlanta
7	Tyler Harper	Republican	Ocilla
8	Russ Goodman	Republican	
9	Nikki Merritt	Democratic	
10	Emanuel Jones	Democratic	Decatur
11	Dean Burke	Republican	Bainbridge
12	Freddie Powell Sims	Democratic	Dawson
13	Carden Summers	Republican	Americus
14	Bruce Thompson	Republican	White
15	Ed Harbison	Democratic	Columbus
16	Marty Harbin	Republican	Tyrone
17	Brian Strickland	Republican	McDonough
18	John F. Kennedy	Republican	Macon
19	Blake Tillery	Republican	Vidalia
20	Larry Walker III	Republican	Perry
21	Brandon Beach	Republican	Alpharetta
22	Harold V. Jones II	Democratic	Augusta
23	Max Burns	Republican	
24	Lee Anderson	Republican	Grovetown
25	Burt Jones	Republican	Jackson
26	David Lucas	Democratic	Macon
27	Greg Dolezal	Republican	Cumming
28	Matt Brass	Republican	Newnan
29	Randy Robertson	Republican	Columbus
30	Mike Dugan	Republican	Carrollton
31	Jason Anavitarte	Republican	
32	Kay Kirkpatrick	Republican	Marietta
33	Michael "Doc" Rhett	Democratic	Marietta
34	Valencia Seay	Democratic	Riverdale
35	Donzella James	Democratic	Atlanta
36	Nan Orrock	Democratic	Atlanta
37	Lindsey Tippins	Republican	Marietta
38	Horacena Tate	Democratic	Atlanta
39	Sonya Halpern	Democratic	
40	Sally Harrell	Democratic	Atlanta
41	Kim Jackson	Democratic	Tucker
42	Elena Parent	Democratic	Atlanta
43	Tonya Anderson	Democratic	Lithonia
44	Gail Davenport	Democratic	Jonesboro
45	Clint Dixon	Republican	
46	Bill Cowsert	Republican	Athens
47	Frank Ginn	Republican	Danielsville
48	Michelle Au	Democratic	
49	Butch Miller	Republican	Gainesville
50	Bo Hatchett	Republican	
51	Steve Gooch	Republican	Dahlonega
52	Chuck Hufstetler	Republican	Rome
53	Jeff Mullis	Republican	Chickamauga
54	Chuck Payne	Republican	Dalton
55	Gloria Butler	Democratic	Stone Mountain
56	John Albers	Republican	Roswell

== Members of the House of Representatives ==
The following is a list of members of the Georgia House of Representatives.

District	Representative	Party	Since	City
1	Mike Cameron	Republican	2021	Rossville
2	Steve Tarvin	Republican	2014	Chickamauga
3	Dewayne Hill	Republican	2017	Ringgold
4	Kasey Carpenter	Republican	2017	Dalton
5	Matt Barton	Republican	2019	Calhoun
6	Jason Ridley	Republican	2017	Chatsworth
7	David Ralston	Republican	2003	Blue Ridge
8	Stan Gunter	Republican	2021	Blairsville
9	Will Wade	Republican	2013	Dawsonville
10	Victor Anderson	Republican	2021	Cornelia
11	Rick Jasperse	Republican	2010	Jasper
12	Eddie Lumsden	Republican	2013	Armuchee
13	Katie M. Dempsey	Republican	2007	Rome
14	Mitchell Scoggins	Republican	2019	Cartersville
15	Matthew Gambill	Republican	2019	Cartersville
16	Trey Kelley	Republican	2013	Cedartown
17	Martin Momtahan	Republican	2019	Dallas
18	Tyler Smith	Republican	2021	Bremen
19	Joseph Gullett	Republican	2019	Dallas
20	Charlice Byrd	Republican	2013	Woodstock
21	Brad Thomas	Republican	2013	Holly Springs
22	Wes Cantrell	Republican	2015	Woodstock
23	Mandi L. Ballinger	Republican	2013	Canton
24	Sheri Gilligan	Republican	2015	Cumming
25	Todd Jones	Republican	2017	South Forsyth
26	Lauren McDonald	Republican	2021	Cumming
27	Lee Hawkins	Republican	2013	Gainesville
28	Chris Erwin	Republican	2019	Homer
29	Matt Dubnik	Republican	2017	Gainesville
30	Emory Dunahoo	Republican	2011	Gillsville
31	Tommy Benton	Republican	2005	Jefferson
32	Alan Powell	Republican	1991	Hartwell
33	Rob Leverett	Republican	1995	Elberton
34	Bert Reeves	Republican	2015	Marietta
35	Ed Setzler	Republican	2005	Acworth
36	Ginny Ehrhart	Republican	2019	Marietta
37	Mary Frances Williams	Democratic	2019	Marietta
38	David Wilkerson	Democratic	2011	Powder Springs
39	Erica Thomas	Democratic	2015	Austell
40	Erick Allen	Democratic	2019	Smyrna
41	Michael Smith	Democratic	2013	Marietta
42	Teri Anulewicz	Democratic	2017	Smyrna
43	Sharon Cooper	Republican	1997	Marietta
44	Don Parsons	Republican	1995	Marietta
45	Matt Dollar	Republican	2003	Marietta
46	John Carson	Republican	2011	Marietta
47	Jan Jones	Republican	2003	Milton
48	Mary Robichaux	Democratic	2019	Roswell
49	Chuck Martin	Republican	2003	Alpharetta
50	Angelika Kausche	Democratic	2019	Johns Creek
51	Josh McLaurin	Democratic	2019	Sandy Springs
52	Shea Roberts	Democratic	2021	Atlanta
53	Sheila Jones	Democratic	2005	Atlanta
54	Betsy Holland	Democratic	2019	Atlanta
55	Marie Metze	Democratic	2015	Atlanta
56	Meisha Meinor	Democratic	2021	Atlanta
57	Stacey Evans	Democratic	2021	Atlanta
58	Park Cannon	Democratic	2016	Atlanta
59	David Dreyer	Democratic	2017	Atlanta
60	Kim Schofield	Democratic	2017	Atlanta
61	Roger Bruce	Democratic	2003	Atlanta
62	William Boddie	Democratic	2017	East Point
63	Debra Bazemore	Democratic	2017	South Fulton
64	Derrick Jackson	Democratic	2017	Tyrone
65	Mandisha Thomas	Democratic	2021	Atlanta
66	Kimberly Alexander	Democratic	2013	Hiram
67	Micah Gravley	Republican	2013	Douglasville
68	J Collins	Republican	2017	Villa Rica
69	Randy Nix	Republican	2007	LaGrange
70	Lynn Smith	Republican	1997	Newnan
71	Philip Singleton	Republican	2019	Sharpsburg
72	Josh Bonner	Republican	2017	Fayetteville
73	Karen Mathiak	Republican	2017	Griffin
74	Yasmin Neal	Democratic	2021	Jonesboro
75	Mike Glanton	Democratic	2013	Jonesboro
76	Sandra Scott	Democratic	2011	Rex
77	Rhonda Burnough	Democratic	2017	Riverdale
78	Demetrius Douglas	Democratic	2013	Stockbridge
79	Mike Wilensky	Democratic	2019	Dunwoody
80	Matthew Wilson	Democratic	2019	Brookhaven
81	Scott Holcomb	Democratic	2011	Atlanta
82	Mary Margaret Oliver	Democratic	2003	Decatur
83	Becky Evans	Democratic	2019	Atlanta
84	Renitta Shannon	Democratic	2017	Decatur
85	Karla Drenner	Democratic	2001	Avondale Estates
86	Zulma Lopez	Democratic	2021	Atlanta
87	Viola Davis	Democratic	2019	Stone Mountain
88	Billy Mitchell	Democratic	2003	Stone Mountain
89	Bee Nguyen	Democratic	2017	Atlanta
90	Angela Moore	Democratic	2021	Decatur
91	Rhonda Taylor	Democratic	2021	Conyers
92	Doreen Carter	Democratic	2015	Lithonia
93	Dar'shun Kendrick	Democratic	2011	Lithonia
94	Karen Bennett	Democratic	2013	Stone Mountain
95	Beth Moore	Democratic	2019	Peachtree Corners
96	Pedro Marin	Democratic	2003	Duluth
97	Bonnie Rich	Republican	2019	Suwanee
98	David Clark	Republican	2015	Buford
99	Marvin Lim	Democratic	2021	Norcross
100	Dewey McClain	Democratic	2013	Lawrenceville
101	Sam Park	Democratic	2017	Lawrenceville
102	Gregg Kennard	Democratic	2017	Lawrenceville
103	Timothy Barr	Republican	2013	Lawrenceville
104	Chuck Efstration	Republican	2013	Dacula
105	Donna McLeod	Democratic	2019	Lawrenceville
106	Rebecca Mitchell	Democratic	2021	Snellville
107	Shelly Hutchinson	Democratic	2019	Snellville
108	Jasmine Clark	Democratic	2019	Lilburn
109	Regina Lewis-Ward	Democratic	2021	McDonough
110	Clint Crowe	Republican	2021	Jackson
111	El-Mahdi Holly	Democratic	2019	Stockbridge
112	Dave Belton	Republican	2015	Buckhead
113	Sharon Henderson	Democratic	2021	Atlanta
114	Tom Kirby	Republican	2012	Loganville
115	Bruce Williamson	Republican	2011	Monroe
116	Terry England	Republican	2005	Auburn
117	Houston Gaines	Republican	2019	Athens
118	Spencer Frye	Democratic	2013	Athens
119	Marcus A. Wiedower	Republican	2019	Watkinsville
120	Trey Rhodes	Republican	2015	Greensboro
121	Barry Fleming	Republican	2013	Harlem
122	Jodi Lott	Republican	2015	Evans
123	Mark Newton	Republican	2017	Augusta
124	Henry Howard	Democratic	2007	Augusta
125	Sheila Clark Nelson	Democratic	2017	Augusta
126	Gloria Frazier	Democratic	2007	Hephzibah
127	Brian Prince	Democratic	2013	Augusta
128	Mack Jackson	Democratic	2009	Sandersville
129	Susan Holmes	Republican	2011	Monticello
130	David Knight	Republican	2005	Griffin
131	Beth Camp	Republican	2021	Concord
132	David Jenkins	Republican	2021	Grantville
133	Vance Smith	Republican	1993	Pine Mountain
134	Richard H. Smith	Republican	2005	Columbus
135	Calvin Smyre	Democratic	1975	Columbus
136	Carolyn Hugley	Democratic	1993	Columbus
137	Debbie Buckner	Democratic	2003	Junction City
138	Mike Cheokas	Republican	2019	Americus
139	Patty Bentley	Democratic	2013	Butler
140	Robert Dickey	Republican	2011	Musella
141	Dale Washburn	Republican	2019	Macon
142	Miriam Paris	Democratic	2017	Macon
143	James Beverly	Democratic	2011	Macon
144	Danny Mathis	Republican	2011	Cochran
145	Rick Williams	Republican	2017	Milledgeville
146	Shaw Blackmon	Republican	2015	Bonaire
147	Heath Clark	Republican	2015	Warner Robins
148	Noel Williams, Jr.	Republican	2019	Cordele
149	Robert Pruitt	Republican	2021	Eastman
150	Matt Hatchett	Republican	2011	Dublin
151	Gerald Greene	Republican	1983	Cuthbert
152	Bill Yearta	Republican	2019	Sylvester
153	CaMia Hopson	Democratic	2019	Albany
154	Winfred Dukes	Democratic	1997	Albany
155	Clay Pirkle	Republican	2015	Ashburn
156	Greg Morris	Republican	1999	Vidalia
157	Bill Werkheiser	Republican	2015	Glennville
158	Butch Parrish	Republican	1985	Swainsboro
159	Jon G. Burns	Republican	2005	Newington
160	Jan Tankersley	Republican	2011	Brooklet
161	Bill Hitchens	Republican	2013	Rincon
162	Carl Wayne Gilliard	Democratic	2016	Garden City
163	Derek Mallow	Democratic	2021	Savannah
164	Ron Stephens	Republican	1997	Savannah
165	Mickey Stephens	Democratic	2009	Savannah
166	Jesse Petrea	Republican	2015	Savannah
167	Buddy DeLoach	Republican	2021	Townsend
168	Al Williams	Democratic	2003	Midway
169	Dominic LaRiccia	Republican	2015	Douglas
170	Penny Houston	Republican	1997	Nashville
171	Joe Campbell	Republican	2020	Camilla
172	Sam Watson	Republican	2013	Moultrie
173	Darlene Taylor	Republican	2011	Thomasville
174	John Corbett	Republican	2015	Lake Park
175	John LaHood	Republican	2018	Valdosta
176	James Burchett	Republican	2019	Waycross
177	Dexter Sharper	Democratic	2013	Valdosta
178	Steven Meeks	Republican	2019	Screven
179	Don Hogan	Republican	2017	St. Simon's Island
180	Steven Sainz	Republican	2019	Woodbine

== See also ==
- List of Georgia state legislatures
