= 152nd Georgia General Assembly =

Term of state legislature in US state of Georgia

←	151st	153rd	→
- Great Seal of the State of Georgia

Overview
- Legislative body: Georgia General Assembly
- Meeting place: Georgia State Capitol

Senate
- Members: 56 (38 R, 18 D)
- President of the Senate: Casey Cagle (R)
- Party control: Republican Party

House of Representatives
- Members: 180 (119 R, 60 D, 1 I)
- Speaker of the House: David Ralston (R)
- Party control: Republican Party

Sessions
- 1st: January 14, 2013 – March 29, 2013
- 2nd: January 13, 2014 – March 21, 2014

The 152nd General Assembly of the U.S. state of Georgia convened its first session on January 14, 2013, at the Georgia State Capitol in Atlanta. The 152nd Georgia General Assembly succeeded the 151st and preceded the 153rd.

== Party composition ==
=== Senate ===
Affiliation	Members
Republican Party	38
Democratic Party	18
Independent	0
Vacancies	0
Total	56

=== House of Representatives ===
Affiliation	Members
Republican Party	119
Democratic Party	60
Independent	1
Vacancies	0
Total	180

== Officers ==
=== Senate ===
Position	Name	District	Party
President	Casey Cagle	n/a	Republican
President Pro Tempore	David Shafer	48	Republican

==== Majority leadership ====
Position	Name	District
Senate Majority Leader	Ronnie Chance	16
Majority Caucus Chairman	Butch Miller	49
Majority Whip	Cecil Staton	18

==== Minority leadership ====
Position	Name	District
Senate Minority Leader	Steve Henson	41
Minority Caucus Chairman	Horacena Tate	38
Minority Whip	Vincent Fort	39

=== House of Representatives ===
Position	Name	District	Party
Speaker of the House	David Ralston	7	Republican
Speaker Pro Tempore	Jan Jones	46	Republican

==== Majority leadership ====
Position	Name	District
House Majority Leader	Larry O'Neal	146
Majority Whip	Edward Lindsey	54
Majority Caucus Chairman	Donna Sheldon	105
Majority Caucus Vice Chairman	Matt Ramsey	72
Majority Caucus Sec./Treas.	Allen Peake	137

==== Minority leadership ====
Position	Name	District
House Minority Leader	Stacey Abrams	84
Minority Whip	Carolyn Hugley	133
Minority Caucus Chairman	Virgil Fludd	64
Minority Caucus Vice Chairman	Billy Mitchell	88
Minority Caucus Secretary	Debbie Buckner	137

== Members of the State Senate ==
District	Senator	Party	First elected	Residence
1	Earl “Buddy” Carter	Republican	2009	Pooler
2	Lester Jackson	Democratic	2008	Savannah
3	William T. Ligon, Jr.	Republican	2010	Brunswick
4	Jack Hill	Republican	1990	Reidsville
5	Curt Thompson	Democratic	2004	Tucker
6	Hunter Hill	Republican	2012	Atlanta
7	Tyler Harper	Republican	2012	Ocilla
8	Tim Golden	Republican	1998	Valdosta
9	Don Balfour	Republican	1992	Snellville
10	Emanuel Jones	Democratic	2004	Decatur
11	Dean Burke	Republican	2012	Bainbridge
12	Freddie Powell Sims	Democratic	2008	Dawson
13	John Crosby	Republican	2008	Tifton
14	Barry Loudermilk	Republican	2010	Cassville
15	Ed Harbison	Democratic	1992	Columbus
16	Ronnie Chance	Republican	2004	Tyrone
17	Rick Jeffares	Republican	2010	Locust Grove
18	Cecil Staton	Republican	2004	Macon
19	Tommie Williams	Republican	1998	Lyons
20	Ross Tolleson	Republican	2002	Perry
21	Brandon Beach	Republican	2012	Alpharetta
22	Hardie Davis	Democratic	2010	Augusta
23	Jesse Stone	Republican	2010	Waynesboro
24	Bill Jackson	Republican	2007	Appling
25	Burt Jones	Republican	2012	Jackson
26	David Lucas	Democratic	2012	Macon
27	Jack Murphy	Republican	2006	Cumming
28	Mike Crane	Republican	2011	Newnan
29	Joshua McKoon	Republican	2010	Columbus
30	Mike Dugan	Republican	2012	Carrollton
31	Bill Heath	Republican	2004	Bremen
32	Judson Hill	Republican	2004	Marietta
33	Steve Thompson	Democratic	1990	Marietta
34	Valencia Seay	Democratic	2003	Riverdale
35	Donzella James	Democratic	2009	College Park
36	Nan Orrock	Democratic	2006	Atlanta
37	Lindsey Tippins	Republican	2010	Marietta
38	Horacena Tate	Democratic	1998	Atlanta
39	Vincent Fort	Democratic	1996	Atlanta
40	Fran Millar	Republican	2010	Atlanta
41	Steve Henson	Democratic	2002	Tucker
42	Jason Carter	Democratic	2010	Decatur
43	Ronald Ramsey, Sr.	Democratic	2006	Decatur
44	Gail Davenport	Democratic	2010	Jonesboro
45	Renee Unterman	Republican	2002	Buford
46	Bill Cowsert	Republican	2006	Athens
47	Frank Ginn	Republican	2010	Danielsville
48	David Shafer	Republican	2001	Duluth
49	Butch Miller	Republican	2010	Gainesville
50	John Wilkinson	Republican	2011	Toccoa
51	Steve Gooch	Republican	2010	Dahlonega
52	Chuck Hufstetler	Republican	2012	Rome
53	Jeff Mullis	Republican	2000	Chickamauga
54	Charlie Bethel	Republican	2010	Dalton
55	Gloria S. Butler	Democratic	1999	Stone Mountain
56	John Albers	Republican	2010	Roswell

=== Changes in membership from previous term ===
District	Previous	Subsequent	Reason for change

=== Changes in membership during current term ===
Barry Loudermilk resigned from the Georgia Senate, representing the 14th district, in August 2013, to focus on his campaign for a seat in the United States House of Representatives. Bruce Thompson won a special election to fill the remainder of his term.

== Members of the House of Representatives ==
District	Representative	Party	First elected	Residence
1	John Deffenbaugh	Republican	2012	Lookout Mountain
2	Jay Neal	Republican	2004	LaFayette
3	Tom Weldon	Republican	2008	Ringgold
4	Bruce Broadrick	Republican	2012	Dalton
5	John D. Meadows, III	Republican	2004	Calhoun
6	Tom Dickson	Republican	2004	Cohutta
7	David Ralston	Republican	2002	Blue Ridge
8	Stephen Allison	Republican	2008	Blairsville
9	Kevin Tanner	Republican	2012	Dawsonville
10	Terry Rogers	Republican	2008	Clarkesville
11	Rick Jasperse	Republican	2010	Jasper
12	Eddie Lumsden	Republican	2012	Armuchee
13	Katie M. Dempsey	Republican	2006	Rome
14	Christian Coomer	Republican	2010	Cartersville
15	Paul Battles	Republican	2008	Cartersville
16	Trey Kelley	Republican	2012	Cedartown
17	Howard R. Maxwell	Republican	2002	Dallas
18	Kevin Cooke	Republican	2010	Carrollton
19	Paulette Braddock	Republican	2010	Hiram
20	Michael Caldwell	Republican	2012	Woodstock
21	Scot Turner	Republican	2012	Holly Springs
22	Calvin Hill	Republican	2002	Canton
23	Mandi L. Ballinger	Republican	2012	Canton
24	Mark Hamilton	Republican	2006	Cumming
25	Mike Dudgeon	Republican	2010	Suwanee
26	Geoff Duncan	Republican	2012	Cumming
27	Lee Hawkins	Republican	2012	Gainesville
28	Dan Gasaway	Republican	2012	Homer
29	Carl Rogers	Republican	1994	Gainesville
30	Emory Dunahoo	Republican	2010	Gainesville
31	Tommy Benton	Republican	2004	Jefferson
32	Alan Powell	Republican	1990	Hartwell
33	Tom McCall	Republican	1994	Elberton
34	Gregory Charles	Republican	2012	Kennesaw
35	Ed Setzler	Republican	2004	Acworth
36	Earl Ehrhart	Republican	1988	Powder Springs
37	Sam Teasley	Republican	2010	Marietta
38	David Wilkerson	Democratic	2010	Austell
39	Alisha Thomas Morgan	Democratic	2002	Austell
40	Rich Golick	Republican	1998	Smyrna
41	Michael Smith	Democratic	2012	Marietta
42	Stacey Evans	Democratic	2010	Smyrna
43	Sharon Cooper	Republican	1996	Marietta
44	Don Parsons	Republican	1994	Marietta
45	Matt Dollar	Republican	2002	Marietta
46	John Carson	Republican	2010	Marietta
47	Jan Jones	Republican	2003	Milton
48	Harry Geisinger	Republican	2004	Roswell
49	Chuck Martin	Republican	2002	Alpharetta
50	Lynne Riley	Republican	2010	Johns Creek
51	Wendell Willard	Republican	2000	Sandy Springs
52	Joe Wilkinson	Republican	2000	Atlanta
53	Sheila Jones	Democratic	2004	Smyrna
54	Edward Lindsey	Republican	2004	Atlanta
55	Tyrone L. Brooks, Sr.	Democratic	1980	Atlanta
56	"Able" Mable Thomas	Democratic	2012	Atlanta
57	Pat Gardner	Democratic	2001	Atlanta
58	Simone Bell	Democratic	2009	Atlanta
59	Margaret Kaiser	Democratic	2006	Atlanta
60	Keisha Waites	Democratic	2012	Atlanta
61	Roger B. Bruce	Democratic	2002	Atlanta
62	LaDawn Jones	Democratic	1994	Atlanta
63	Ronnie Mabra	Democratic	2012	Fayetteville
64	Virgil Fludd	Democratic	2002	Tyrone
65	Sharon Beasley-Teague	Democratic	1992	Red Oak
66	Kimberly Alexander	Democratic	2012	Hiram
67	Micah Gravley	Republican	2012	Douglasville
68	Dustin Hightower	Republican	2012	Carrollton
69	Randy Nix	Republican	2006	LaGrange
70	Lynn Ratigan Smith	Republican	1996	Newnan
71	David Stover	Republican	2012	Newnan
72	Matt Ramsey	Republican	2006	Peachtree City
73	John P. Yates	Republican	1988	Griffin
74	Valencia Stovall	Democratic	2012	Ellenwood
75	Mike Glanton	Democratic	2012	Jonesboro
76	Sandra Scott	Democratic	2010	Rex
77	Darryl Jordan	Democratic	2000	Riverdale
78	Demetrius Douglas	Democratic	2008	Stockbridge
79	Tom Taylor	Republican	2010	Dunwoody
80	Mike Jacobs	Republican	2004	Atlanta
81	Scott Holcomb	Democratic	2010	Atlanta
82	Mary Margaret Oliver	Democratic	2002	Decatur
83	Howard Mosby	Democratic	2002	Atlanta
84	Rahn Mayo	Democratic	2008	Atlanta
85	Karla Drenner	Democratic	2000	Avondale Estates
86	Michele D. Henson	Democratic	1990	Stone Mountain
87	Earnest "Coach" Williams	Democratic	2002	Avondale Estates
88	Billy Mitchell	Democratic	2002	Stone Mountain
89	Stacey Abrams	Democratic	2006	Atlanta
90	Pam Stephenson	Democratic	2002	Decatur
91	Dee Dawkins-Haigler	Democratic	2008	Lithonia
92	Tonya Anderson	Democratic	2012	Lithonia
93	Dar'shun Kendrick	Democratic	2010	Lithonia
94	Karen Bennett	Democratic	2012	Stone Mountain
95	Tom Rice	Republican	1996	Norcross
96	Pedro Rafael Marin	Democratic	2002	Duluth
97	Brooks Coleman	Republican	1992	Duluth
98	Josh Clark	Republican	2010	Buford
99	Hugh Floyd	Democratic	2002	Norcross
100	Brian W. Thomas	Democratic	2004	Lilburn
101	Valerie Clark	Republican	2010	Lawrenceville
102	Buzz Brockway	Republican	2010	Lawrenceville
103	Timothy Barr	Republican	2012	Lawrenceville
104	Donna Sheldon	Republican	2002	Dacula
105	Joyce Chandler	Republican	2012	Snellville
106	Brett Harrell	Republican	2010	Snellville
107	David Casas	Republican	2002	Lilburn
108	B.J. Pak	Republican	2010	Lilburn
109	Dale Rutledge	Republican	2012	McDonough
110	Andrew Welch	Republican	2010	McDonough
111	Brian Strickland	Republican	2012	McDonough
112	Doug Holt	Republican	2004	Social Circle
113	Pam Dickerson	Democratic	2010	Conyers
114	Tom Kirby	Republican	2011	Loganville
115	Bruce Williamson	Republican	2010	Monroe
116	Terry Lamar England	Republican	2004	Auburn
117	Regina Quick	Republican	2012	Athens
118	Spencer Frye	Democratic	2012	Athens
119	Chuck Williams	Republican	2011	Watkinsville
120	Mickey Channell	Republican	2002	Greensboro
121	Barry Fleming	Republican	2012	Harlem
122	Ben L. Harbin	Republican	1994	Evans
123	Barbara Sims	Republican	2006	Augusta
124	Henry Howard	Democratic	2006	Augusta
125	Earnest Smith	Democratic	2009	Augusta
126	Gloria Frazier	Democratic	2006	Hephzibah
127	Quincy Murphy	Democratic	2002	Augusta
128	Mack Jackson	Democratic	2008	Sandersville
129	Susan Holmes	Republican	2010	Monticello
130	David Knight	Republican	2004	Griffin
131	Johnnie Caldwell, Jr.	Republican	2012	Thomaston
132	Carl Von Epps	Democratic	1992	LaGrange
133	John David Pezold	Republican	2012	Fortson
134	Richard H. Smith	Republican	2004	Columbus
135	Calvin Smyre	Democratic	1974	Columbus
136	Carolyn Hugley	Democratic	1992	Columbus
137	Debbie Buckner	Democratic	2002	Junction City
138	Mike Cheokas	Republican	2004	Americus
139	Patty Bentley	Democratic	2012	Reynolds
140	Robert Dickey	Republican	2011	Musella
141	Allen Peake	Republican	2006	Macon
142	Nikki Randall	Democratic	1999	Macon
143	James Beverly	Democratic	2012	Macon
144	Bubber Epps	Republican	2008	Dry Branch
145	Rusty Kidd	Independent	2009	Milledgeville
146	Larry O'Neal	Republican	2001	Bonaire
147	Willie Lee Talton	Republican	2004	Warner Robins
148	Buddy Harden	Republican	2008	Cordele
149	Jimmy Pruett	Republican	2006	Eastman
150	Matt Hatchett	Republican	2010	Dublin
151	Gerald E. Greene	Republican	1982	Cuthbert
152	Ed Rynders	Republican	2002	Albany
153	Carol Fullerton	Democratic	2008	Albany
154	Winfred J. Dukes	Democratic	1996	Albany
155	Jay Roberts	Republican	2002	Ocilla
156	Greg Morris	Republican	1998	Vidalia
157	Delvis Dutton	Republican	2010	Glennville
158	Larry "Butch" Parrish	Republican	1984	Swainsboro
159	Jon G. Burns	Republican	2004	Newington
160	Jan Tankersley	Republican	2010	Brooklet
161	Bill Hitchens	Republican	2012	Rincon
162	Bob Bryant	Democratic	2004	Garden City
163	J. Craig Gordon	Democratic	2006	Savannah
164	Ron Stephens	Republican	1996	Savannah
165	Mickey Stephens	Democratic	2008	Savannah
166	Ben Watson	Republican	2010	Savannah
167	Jeff Chapman	Republican	2012	Brunswick
168	Al Williams	Democratic	2002	Midway
169	Chuck Sims	Republican	1996	Ambrose
170	Penny Houston	Republican	1998	Nashville
171	Jay Powell	Republican	2008	Camilla
172	Sam Watson	Republican	2008	Moultrie
173	Darlene K. Taylor	Republican	2010	Thomasville
174	Ellis Black	Republican	2002	Valdosta
175	Amy Carter	Republican	2006	Valdosta
176	Jason Shaw	Republican	2010	Lakeland
177	Dexter Sharper	Democratic	2012	Valdosta
178	Chad Nimmer	Republican	2011	Blackshear
179	Alex Atwood	Republican	2010	Brunswick
180	Jason Spencer	Republican	2010	Woodbine

=== Changes in membership from previous term ===
District	Previous	Subsequent	Reason for change

=== Changes in membership during current term ===
Date seat became vacant	District	Previous	Reason for change	Subsequent	Date of successor's taking office
July 1, 2013	100	Brian W. Thomas	Resigned	Dewey McClain	December 5, 2013
August 27, 2013	104	Donna Sheldon	Resigned	Chuck Efstration	December 13, 2013
October 30, 2013	22	Calvin Hill	Deceased	Sam Moore	February 11, 2014

== See also ==
- List of Georgia state legislatures
