= 153rd Georgia General Assembly =

Term of state legislature in US state of Georgia

153d Georgia General Assembly
←	152nd	154th	→
- Great Seal of the State of Georgia

Overview
- Legislative body: Georgia General Assembly
- Meeting place: Georgia State Capitol

Senate
- Members: 56 (38 R, 18 D)
- President of the Senate: Casey Cagle (R)
- Party control: Republican Party

House of Representatives
- Members: 180 (119 R, 60 D, 1 I)
- Party control: Republican Party

Sessions
- 1st: January 12, 2015 – April 2, 2015
- 2nd: January 11, 2016 – March 24, 2016

The 153rd General Assembly of the U.S. state of Georgia convened its first session on January 12, 2015, at the Georgia State Capitol in Atlanta. Its second session was January 11 through March 24, 2016. The 153rd Georgia General Assembly succeeded the 152nd of 2013 and 2014, and preceded the 154th in 2017 and 2018.

== Party composition ==
Of the 180 Georgia State House seats and 56 Georgia State Senate seats, zero changed hands with respect to political party following the 2014 elections.

=== Senate ===
Affiliation	Members
Republican Party	38
Democratic Party	18
Independent	0
Vacancies	0
Total	56

=== House of Representatives ===
Affiliation	Members
Republican Party	119
Democratic Party	60
Independent	1
Vacancies	0
Total	180

== Officers ==
=== Senate ===
Position	Name	District	Party
President	Casey Cagle	n/a	Republican
President Pro Tempore	David Shafer	48	Republican

==== Majority leadership ====
Position	Name	District
Senate Majority Leader	Bill Cowsert	46
Majority Caucus Chairman	William Ligon, Jr.	3
Majority Whip	Steve Gooch	51

==== Minority leadership ====
Position	Name	District
Senate Minority Leader	Steve Henson	41
Minority Caucus Chairman	Horacena Tate	38
Minority Whip	Vincent Fort	39

=== House of Representatives ===
Position	Name	District	Party
Speaker of the House	David Ralston	7	Republican
Speaker Pro Tempore	Jan Jones	47	Republican

==== Majority leadership ====
Position	Name	District
House Majority Leader	Jon G. Burns	159
Majority Whip	Matt Ramsey	72
Majority Caucus Chairman	Matt Hatchett	150
Majority Caucus Vice-chairman	Sam Teasley	37
Majority Caucus Sec./Treas.	Bruce Williamson	115

==== Minority leadership ====
Position	Name	District
House Minority Leader	Stacey Abrams	89
Minority Whip	Carolyn Hugley	136
Minority Caucus Chairman	Virgil Fludd	64
Minority Caucus Vice-chairman	Billy Mitchell	88
Minority Caucus Secretary	Pat Gardner	57
Minority Caucus Treasurer	David Wilkerson	38

== See also ==
- List of Georgia state legislatures
