= Edward Reeder =

Edward Reeder may refer to:

- Edward R. Reeder (1929–1996), American politician, member of the Georgia State Senate
- Edward Dickson Reeder (1912–1970), American artist
