= Orlando Scott (politician) =

American politician

Member of the Georgia House of Representatives from the 162nd district
- Member-elect
- Assumed office January 11, 2027
- Preceded by: Carl Gilliard

Personal details
- Party: Democratic
- Website: Official website

Orlando Scott is an American politician who is a member of the Georgia House of Representatives, representing the 162nd district. He was elected unopposed to the Georgia House of Representatives, in the general election on November 3, 2026. He is a resident of Chatham County.
