= Jasperse =

Jasperse is a surname. Notable people with the surname include:

- John Jasperse (born 1963), American choreographer and dancer
- Rick Jasperse (born 1956), American politician
