= Rick Townsend =

American politician

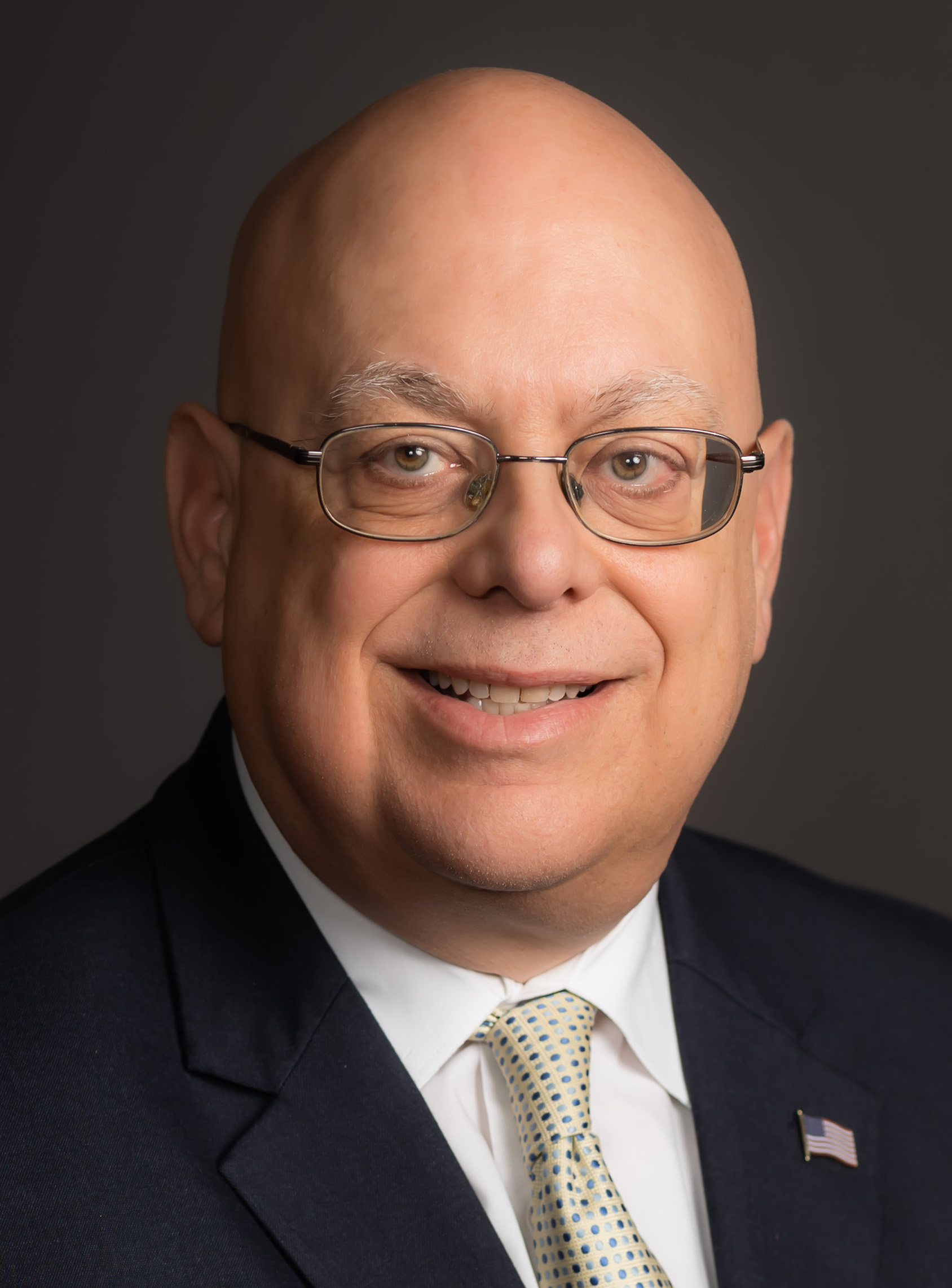
- Official headshot

Member of the Georgia House of Representatives from the 179th district
- Incumbent
- Assumed office January 9, 2023
- Preceded by: Don Hogan (redistricting)

Personal details
- Party: Republican

Richard Allen Townsend is an American politician. He is a member of the Georgia House of Representatives from the 179th District.

Townsend has worked as a teacher, a coach, a principal, a superintendent.
