= Ed Reeder =

American politician

Edward R. Reeder

Member of the Georgia State Senate from the 55th district
- In office 1969–1970

Personal details
- Born: April 4, 1929 Fulton County, Georgia, U.S.
- Died: May 17, 1996 (aged 67)
- Party: Republican
- Education: University of Georgia

Edward R. Reeder (April 4, 1929 – May 17, 1996) was an American politician. He served as a Republican member for the 55th district of the Georgia State Senate.

== Life and career ==
Reeder was born in Fulton County, Georgia. He attended the University of Georgia.

Reeder was a sales engineer.

Reeder served in the Georgia State Senate from 1969 to 1970, representing the 55th district.

Reeder died on May 17, 1996, at the age of 67.
