= Alex Atwood =

American politician

Member of the Georgia House of Representatives from the 179th district
- In office January 10, 2011 – January 9, 2017
- Preceded by: Jerry Keen
- Succeeded by: Don Hogan

Personal details
- Born: October 9, 1949 (age 76) United States
- Party: Republican

Alexander Atwood (born October 9, 1949) is an American politician. He was a member of the Georgia House of Representatives from the 179th District, from 2011 to 2017. He is a member of the Republican party.
