= Georgia's 55th Senate district =

Georgia's 55th State Senate district
Senator
Randal Mangham; D–Stone Mountain
- Demographics: 20.96% White; 59.87% Black; 9.39% Hispanic; 5.35% Asian; 0.19% Native American; 0.03% Hawaiian/Pacific Islander; 0.64% Other; 4.70% Multiracial
- Population (2020) • Voting age: 192,235; 145,915

District 55 of the Georgia Senate is in eastern Metro Atlanta.

The district includes parts of DeKalb and Gwinnett counties, covering parts of Centerville, Lithonia, Mountain Park, Snellville, Stone Mountain, Stonecrest, and Tucker.

The current senator is Randal Mangham, a Democrat from Stone Mountain first elected in 2024 after previously serving in the Georgia House of Representatives.

== List of senators ==
Member	Party	Years	Residence	Electoral history	Counties
District created in 1969
Ed Reeder		1969 – January 11, 1971			
Max Cleland		January 11, 1971 – January 13, 1975			
Bud Stumbaugh		January 13, 1975 – January 1991			
Steve Henson		January 1991 – January 1999			
Gloria Butler		January 11, 1999 – January 13, 2025			
Randal Mangham		January 13, 2025 - present	Clayton		
