= Georgia's 20th Senate district =

Georgia state senate district

Georgia's 20th State Senate district
Senator
Larry Walker III; R–Perry
- Demographics: 59.74% White; 30.65% Black; 4.21% Hispanic; 1.73% Asian; 0.15% Native American; 0.05% Hawaiian/Pacific Islander; 0.31% Other; 4.14% Multiracial
- Population (2020) • Voting age: 192,588; 147,033

District 20 of the Georgia Senate is located in Middle Georgia.

The district includes Bleckley, Dodge, Dooly, southern Houston, Laurens, Pulaski, Treutlen, and Wilcox counties. Cities in the district include Dublin, Eastman, Perry, Vienna, and part of Warner Robins.

The current senator is Larry Walker III, a Republican from Perry first elected in a special election in 2015.
