= Don Hogan =

American politician

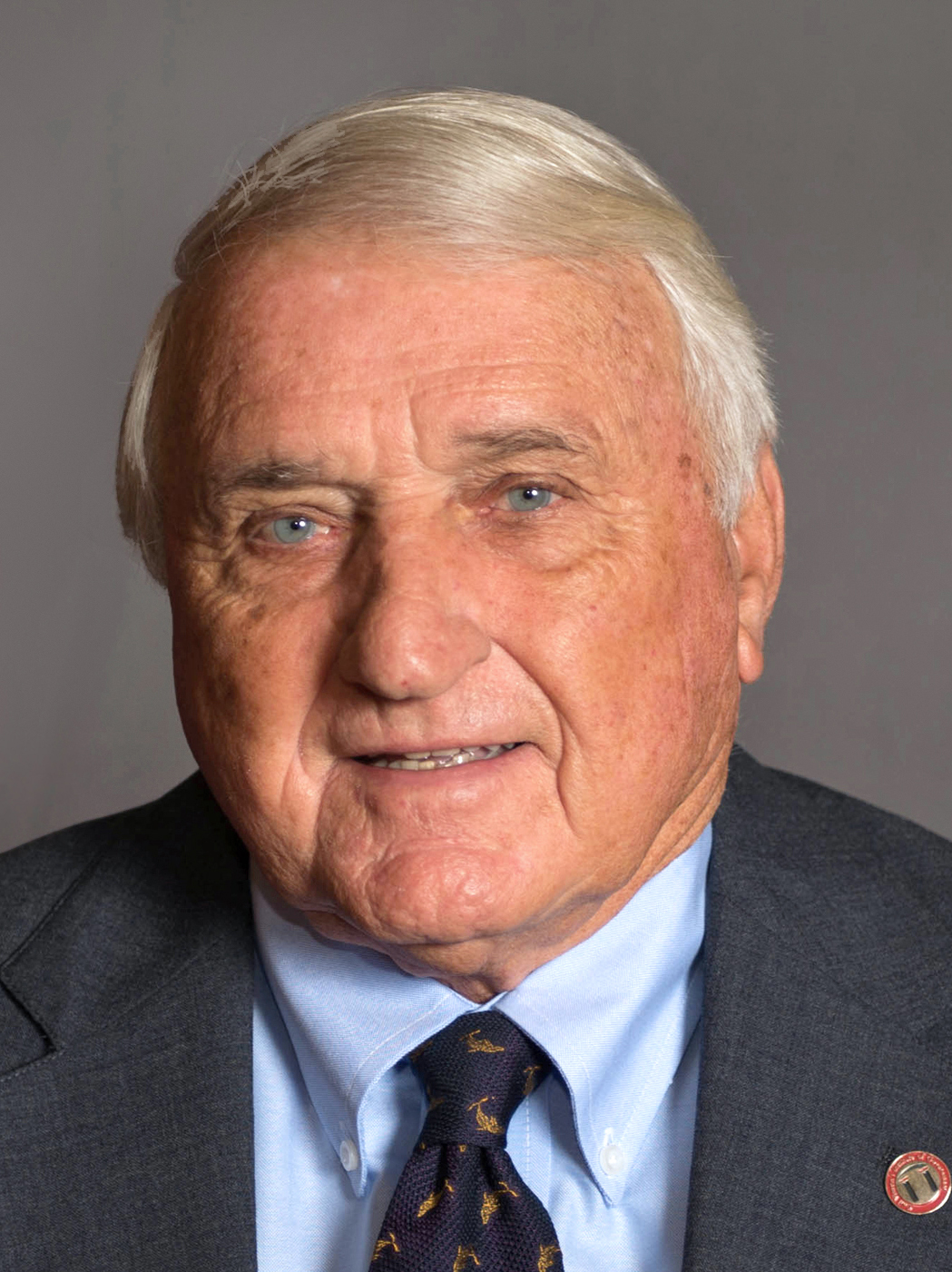

Member of the Georgia House of Representatives from the 179th district
- In office January 9, 2017 – January 9, 2023
- Preceded by: Alex Atwood
- Succeeded by: Rick Townsend

Personal details
- Born: James Donald Hogan; March 15, 1939 (age 87)
- Party: Republican
- Spouse: Libby

James Donald Hogan (born March 15, 1939) is an American politician from Georgia. Hogan is a former Republican member of Georgia House of Representatives for District 179.

Georgia House of Representatives
Preceded by Alex Atwood	Member of the Georgia House of Representatives from the 179th district 2017–2023	Succeeded by Rick Townsend
