= Larry Walker III =

American politician (born 1965)

Larry Walker
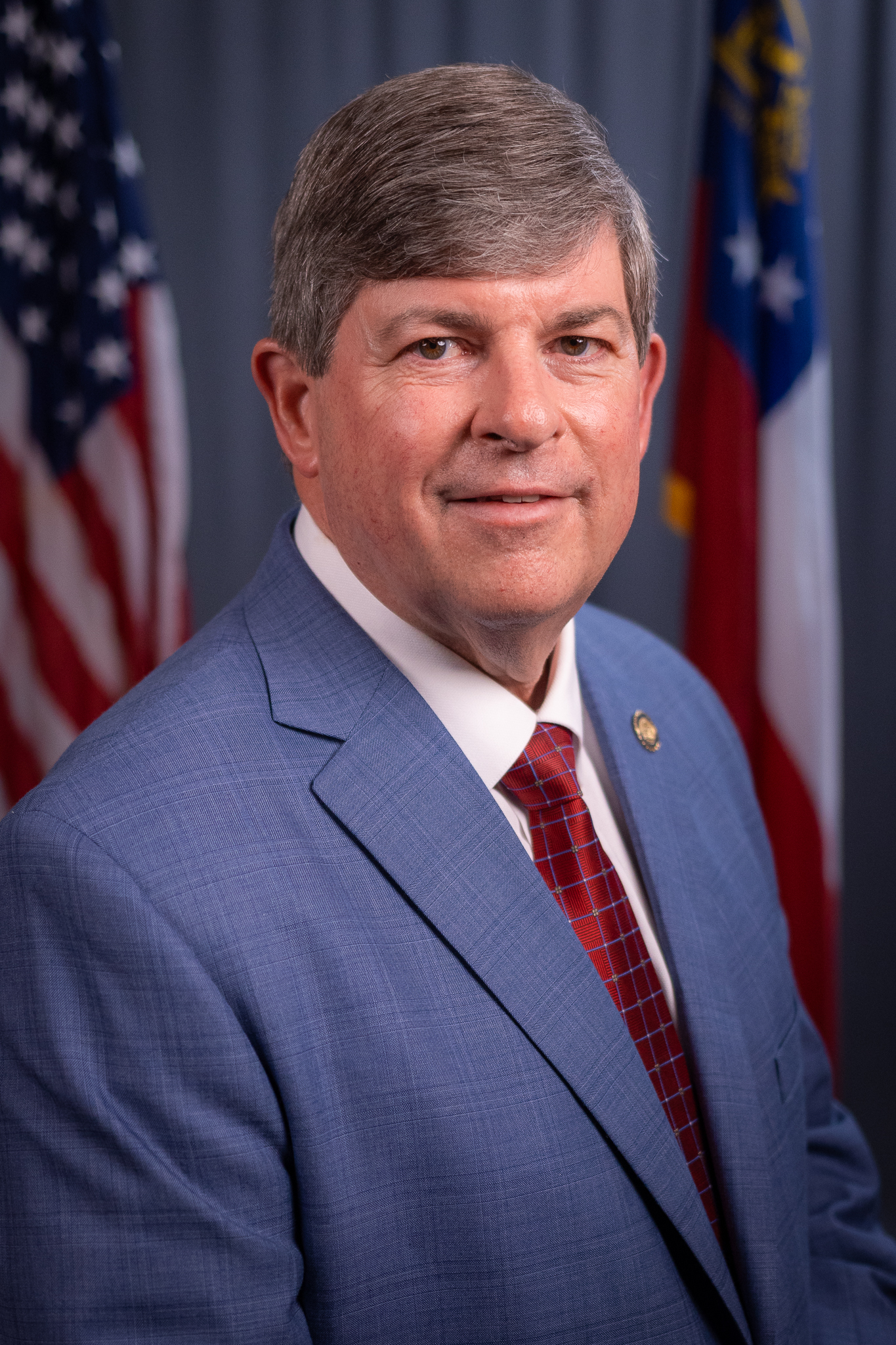

President pro tempore of the Georgia State Senate
- Incumbent
- Assumed office January 12, 2026
- Preceded by: John Kennedy

Member of the Georgia State Senate from the 20th district
- Incumbent
- Assumed office December 18, 2015
- Preceded by: Ross Tolleson

Personal details
- Born: Lawrence Cohen Walker III; June 17, 1965 (age 60) Perry, Georgia, U.S.
- Party: Republican
- Spouse: Adrienne Horne
- Parent: Larry Walker (father)
- Education: University of Georgia (BBA)

Lawrence Cohen Walker III (born June 17, 1965) is an American politician, currently serving as a member of the Georgia State Senate from the 20th district. A member of the Republican Party, he won a special election in December 2015 to succeed Ross Tolleson, who resigned for health reasons.

Walker's father, Larry Walker, served more than thirty years in the Georgia House of Representatives, almost half of which as majority leader.

In January 2024, Walker introduced S.B. 390, which would withhold government funding for any libraries in Georgia affiliated with the American Library Association. The bill was drafted following the election of ALA President Emily Drabinski and allegations of the organization promoting a personal ideology and influencing librarian certification. He was elected as Senate president pro tempore in January 2026.

Georgia State Senate
Preceded by John Kennedy	President pro tempore of the Georgia Senate; 2026–present	Incumbent
