= John Corbett (politician) =

American politician from Georgia

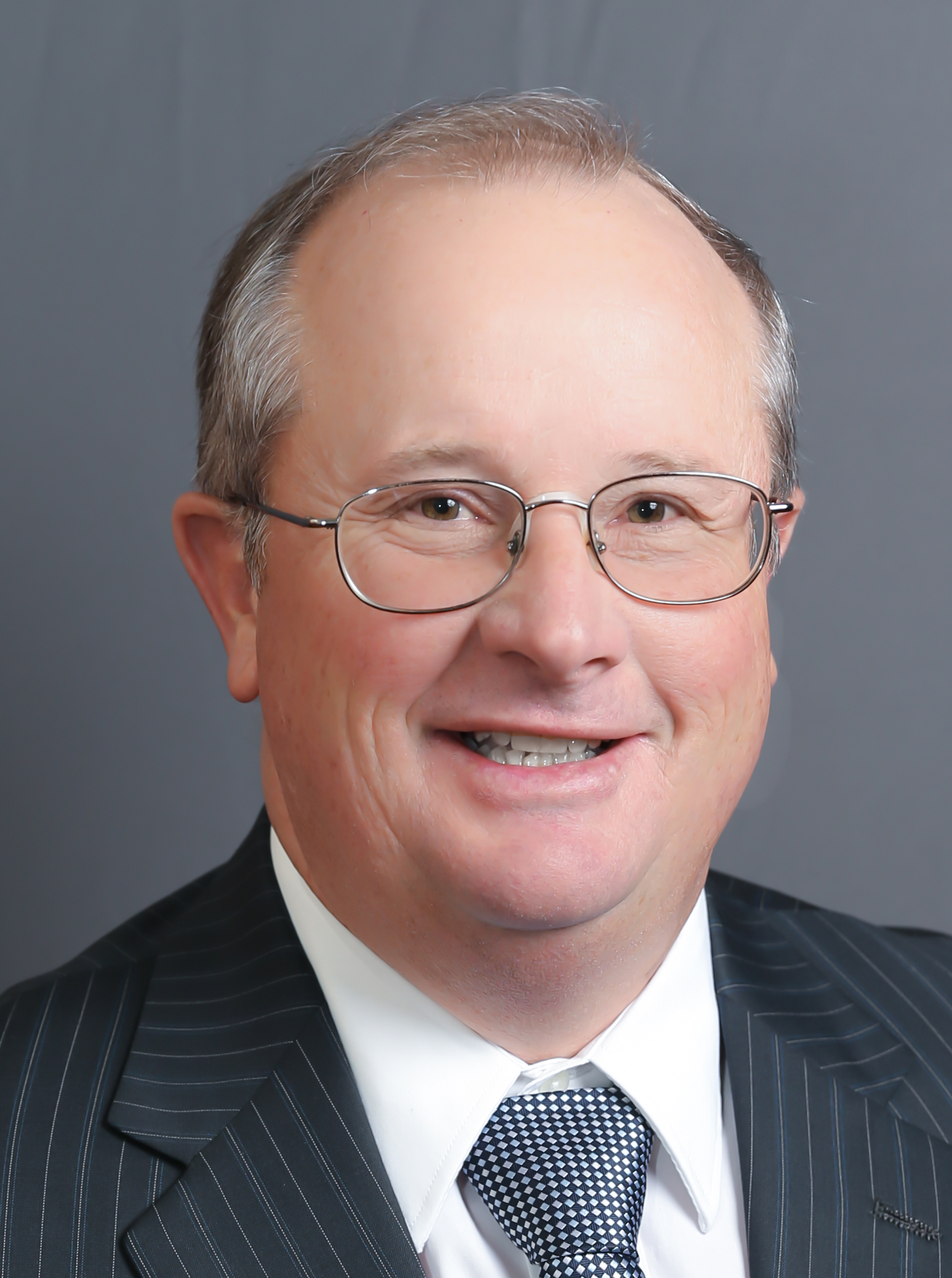
- Official headshot

Member of the Georgia House of Representatives from the 174th district
- Incumbent
- Assumed office January 12, 2015
- Preceded by: C. Ellis Black

Personal details
- Born: September 23, 1962 (age 63) Echols County, Georgia, U.S.
- Party: Republican

John L. Corbett (born September 23, 1962) is an American politician who has served in the Georgia House of Representatives from the 174th district since 2015.

== Political career ==
Corbett endorsed Marco Rubio in the 2016 Republican presidential primary, serving as a state leadership team member.

In 2026, Corbett was appointed to serve on a Blue-ribbon committee on the impact of kratom exposure on youths.
