= Kasey Carpenter =

American politician from Georgia

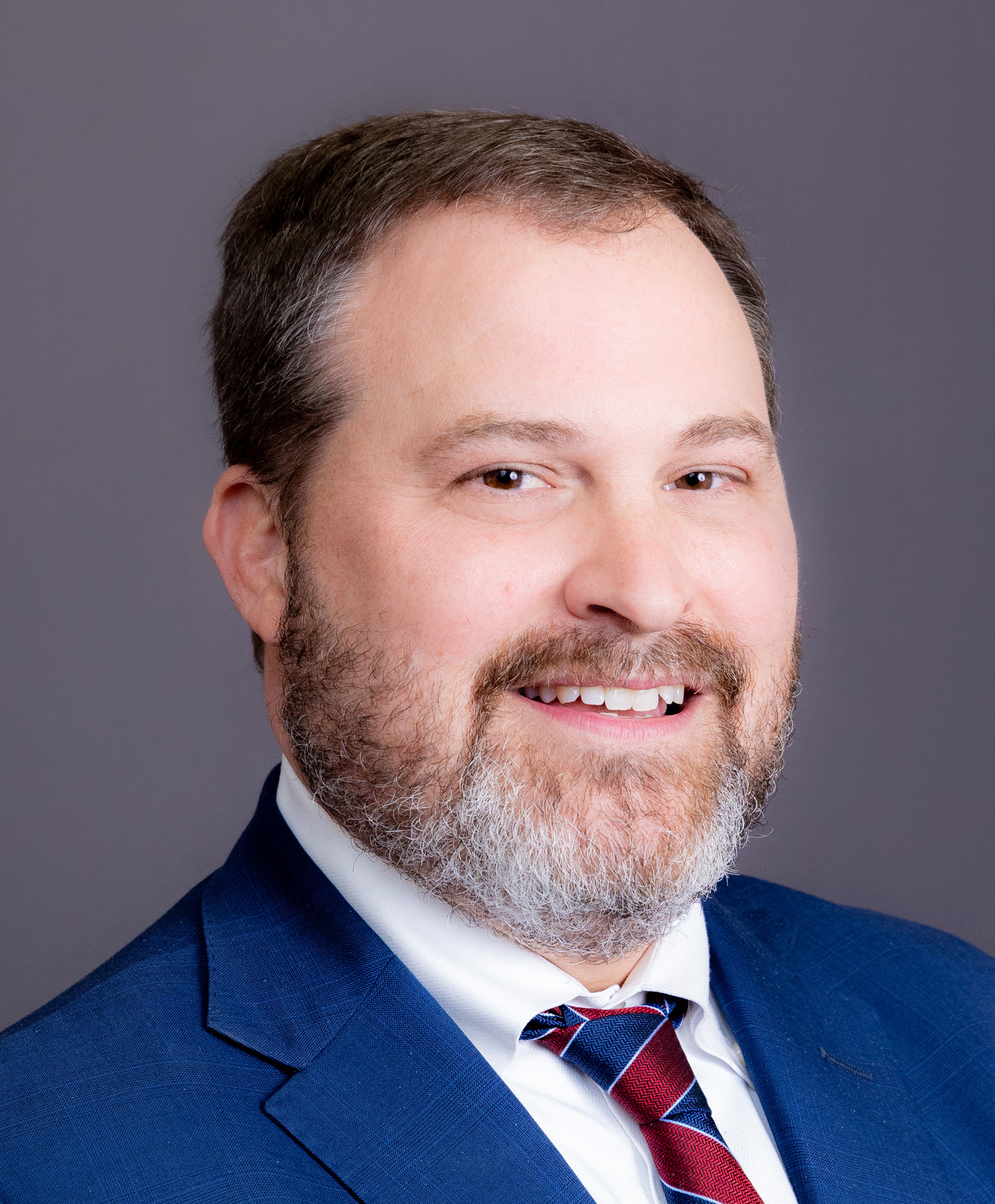

Member of the Georgia House of Representatives from the 4th district
- Incumbent
- Assumed office November 20, 2017
- Preceded by: Bruce Broadrick

Personal details
- Born: Kasey Scott Carpenter; May 4, 1978 (age 48)
- Party: Republican
- Spouse: Julie Carpenter
- Children: 4
- Education: University of Georgia
- Occupation: Business owner

Kasey Scott Carpenter is an American politician from Georgia. Carpenter is a Republican member of Georgia House of Representatives for District 4.

== Education ==
In 2001, Carpenter earned a Bachelor of Arts degree in finance from University of Georgia.

== Career ==
Carpenter is a restaurant owner in Georgia. In 2017, Carpenter won the election and became a member of the Georgia House of Representatives for District 4. He is a member of the Republican Party. In January 2022, Speaker David Ralston appointed Carpenter to serve as Chairman of the House Creative Arts & Entertainment Committee.

== Personal life ==
Carpenter's wife is Julie Carpenter. They have four children.
