= Georgia's 22nd Senate district =

American legislative district

Georgia's 22nd State Senate district
Senator
Harold V. Jones II; D–Augusta
- Demographics: 31.10% White; 56.58% Black; 5.63% Hispanic; 1.97% Asian; 0.24% Native American; 0.18% Hawaiian/Pacific Islander; 0.44% Other; 4.96% Multiracial
- Population (2020) • Voting age: 193,163; 150,450

District 22 of the Georgia Senate is located in East Georgia, anchored in the Augusta metropolitan area.

The district includes most of Augusta-Richmond County, including Augusta National Golf Club and Fort Gordon.

The current senator is Harold V. Jones II, a Democrat from Augusta first elected in 2014. Jones currently serves as the Senate minority leader.
