= Chuck Payne =

American politician

Member of the Georgia State Senate from the 54th district
- Incumbent
- Assumed office January 18, 2017
- Preceded by: Charlie Bethel

Personal details
- Born: December 22, 1964 (age 61) Riverdale, Georgia, U.S.
- Party: Republican
- Spouse: Angie Sellers (m. 1988)

Charles F. Payne (born December 22, 1964) is an American politician who has served in the Georgia State Senate from the 54th district since 2017. Payne, a Republican, was first elected to serve as the State Senator for the 54th district in January 2017. Payne serves as Vice Chairman of the Senate State and Local Governmental Operations Committee, Ex-Officio of the Senate Public Safety Committee, Secretary of the Senate Finance Committee, Secretary of the Senate Higher Education Committee and Secretary of the Senate State Institutions and Property Committee. Payne also serves as Chairman of the Senate Finance Sub-Committee on issues pertaining to Ad Valorem Taxes.

Payne served four years (1984-1988) in the Army and the 82nd Airborne Division at Fort Bragg, NC. It was during this time that he met Angie Sellers, and they were married in January 1988. In that same year, they moved back to Dalton and Payne began his 30-year career of public service with the Georgia Department of Juvenile Justice. Payne retired on October 31, 2016.

Payne has served as Chairman of the Whitfield County Republican Party of Georgia throughout the years of 1997-2005 and 2013-2016. He was also elected among his peers to serve as Vice-Chair of both the GA-9th Congressional District Republican Party (2009) and the GA-14th District Republican Party (2010-2013).

Payne and his wife, Angie, have two children. In March 2019, their family welcomed the birth of their first grandchild.

== Controversies ==
=== Censure from the Whitfield County and 14th District Republican Party ===
In early 2025, Georgia State Senator Chuck Payne faced formal censure from both the Whitfield County Republican Party and the 14th Congressional District Republican Party. The Whitfield County GOP unanimously passed a resolution on March 22, citing Payne's support for legislation they deemed contrary to conservative principles, including Senate Bill 68 (tort reform), House Bill 206 (environmental regulations), and a vote against Senate Bill 57 (the Freedom of Speech & Belief Act). Subsequently, on April 26, the 14th Congressional District GOP adopted an identical resolution, expressing disapproval of Payne's legislative decisions and calling for a renewed commitment to conservative values.
