= Rhonda Burnough =

American politician from Georgia

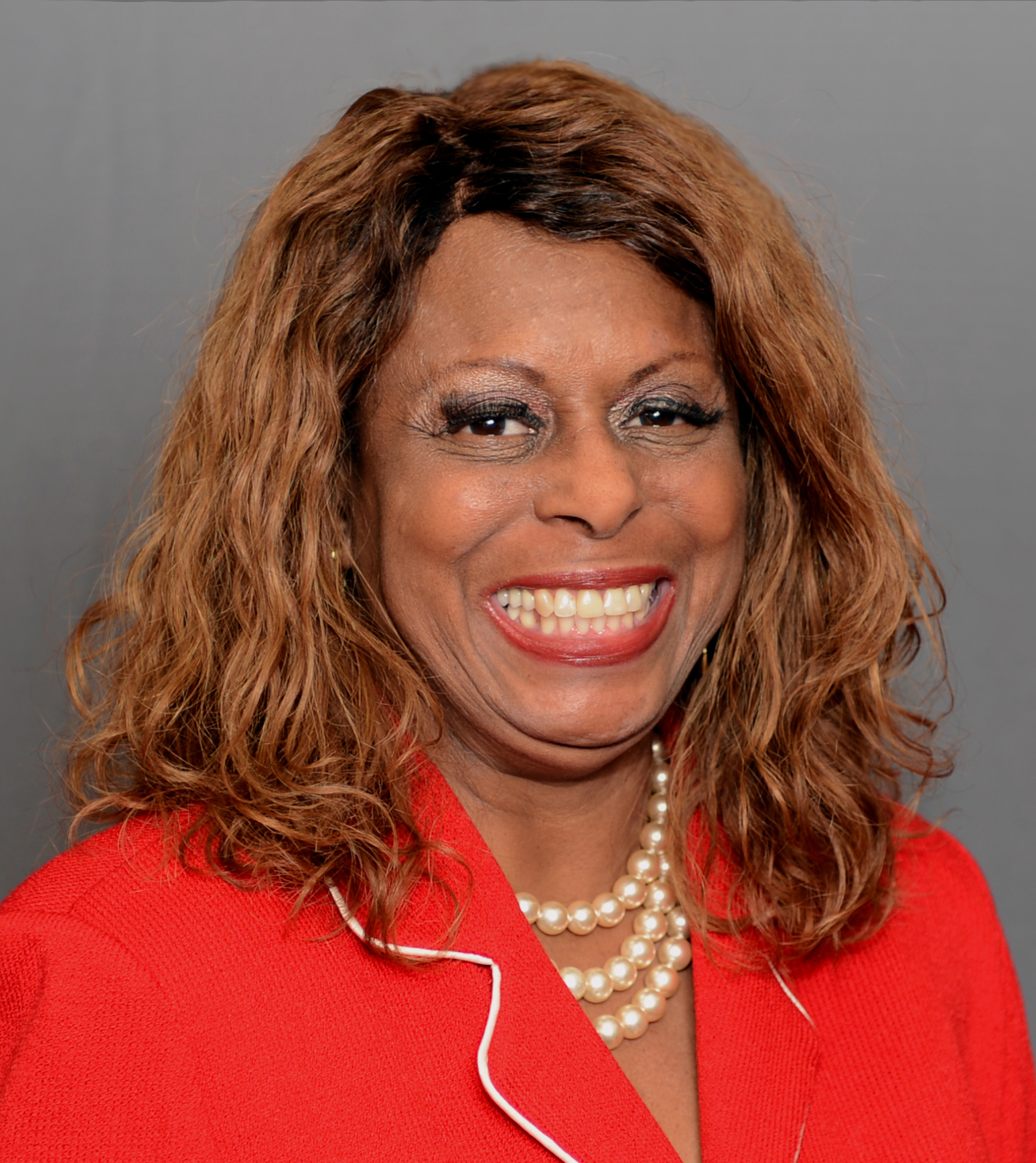

Member of the Georgia House of Representatives from the 77th district
- Incumbent
- Assumed office January 9, 2017
- Preceded by: Darryl Jordan

Personal details
- Born: November 2, 1954 (age 71)
- Party: Democratic

Rhonda Michelle Burnough (born November 2, 1954) is an American politician who has served in the Georgia House of Representatives from the 77th district since 2017.
