= Steve Henson (politician) =

American politician

Minority Leader of the Georgia Senate
- In office June 20, 2011 – January 11, 2021
- Preceded by: Robert Brown
- Succeeded by: Gloria Butler

Member of the Georgia Senate from the 41st district
- In office January 2003 – January 11, 2021
- Preceded by: Bart Ladd
- Succeeded by: Kim Jackson

Member of the Georgia Senate from the 55th district
- In office January 1991 – January 1999
- Preceded by: Bud Stumbaugh
- Succeeded by: Gloria Butler

Personal details
- Born: March 30, 1959 (age 67) Indianapolis, Indiana, U.S.
- Party: Democratic
- Education: University of Georgia (BA)
- Website: Official website

Stephen Bradley Henson (born March 30, 1959) is an American politician from the state of Georgia. A member of the Democratic Party, Henson was a member of the Georgia State Senate. He served as Minority Leader from 2011 to 2021.

== Education ==
Henson attended elementary school and high school in DeKalb county. He received a bachelor's degree in economics from the University of Georgia.

== Political career ==
=== Georgia State Senate – District 55 ===
Henson was elected to the State Senate in 1991 where he represented Stone Mountain. He was re-elected three times representing his senate district from 1991 to 1999.

=== Georgia Labor Commissioner race ===
Henson ran for the Georgia Labor Commissioner in 1998. He ran on his experience with job training. He lost in the Democratic primary run-off.

=== Georgia State Senate – District 41 ===
Henson was elected to the Senate District 41 in 2002 where he represents Tucker. On June 20, 2011, he was elected as the Senate Minority leader.

In 2011, Henson criticized the Republican majority for passing HB 1198 stating, "The Republican strategy is to make the tax system as regressive as possible. I can’t believe they did this. They have an insensitivity to the people, and you would think that would not be the case in these tough economic times." In December 2012, Henson criticized the appointment of Chip Rogers by the Governor Nathan Deal to a high-level position with the Georgia Public Broadcasting. Henson stated, "I’m just amazed the governor once again tried to pick someone who he has political contacts to and lacks professionalism for the job. … Chip Rogers couldn’t win re-election as majority leader, he had the banking problems, problems working with the gambling company. Now, he gets promoted to a job at Georgia public television. It’s amazing."

In his 2018 run for re-election he won his seat. On July 10, 2019, Henson announced that he would not run for re-election to the Senate.

Georgia State Senate
Preceded by Robert Brown	Minority Leader of the Georgia Senate; 2011–2021	Succeeded by Gloria Butler
