= Georgia's 162nd House of Representatives district =

State district in Georgia, USA

Georgia's 162nd State House of Representatives district
Representative
Carl Gilliard; D–Savannah
- Demographics: 31.2% White; 53.9% Black; 9.6% Hispanic; 2.4% Asian
- Population: 60,878

District 162 elects one member of the Georgia House of Representatives. It contains parts of Chatham County.

== Members ==
- Carl Gilliard (2016-2027)
- Orlando Scott (2027-)
