= Georgia's 158th House of Representatives district =

State district in Georgia, USA

Georgia's 158th State House of Representatives district
Representative
Butch Parrish; R–Swainsboro
- Demographics: 59.2% White; 32.8% Black; 4.5% Hispanic; 0.8% Asian
- Population: 54,335

District 158 elects one member of the Georgia House of Representatives. It contains the entirety of Candler County, Emanuel County, Treutlen County, as well as parts of Bulloch County.

== Members ==
- Butch Parrish (since 2013)
