= Gloria Butler =

American politician (born 1941)

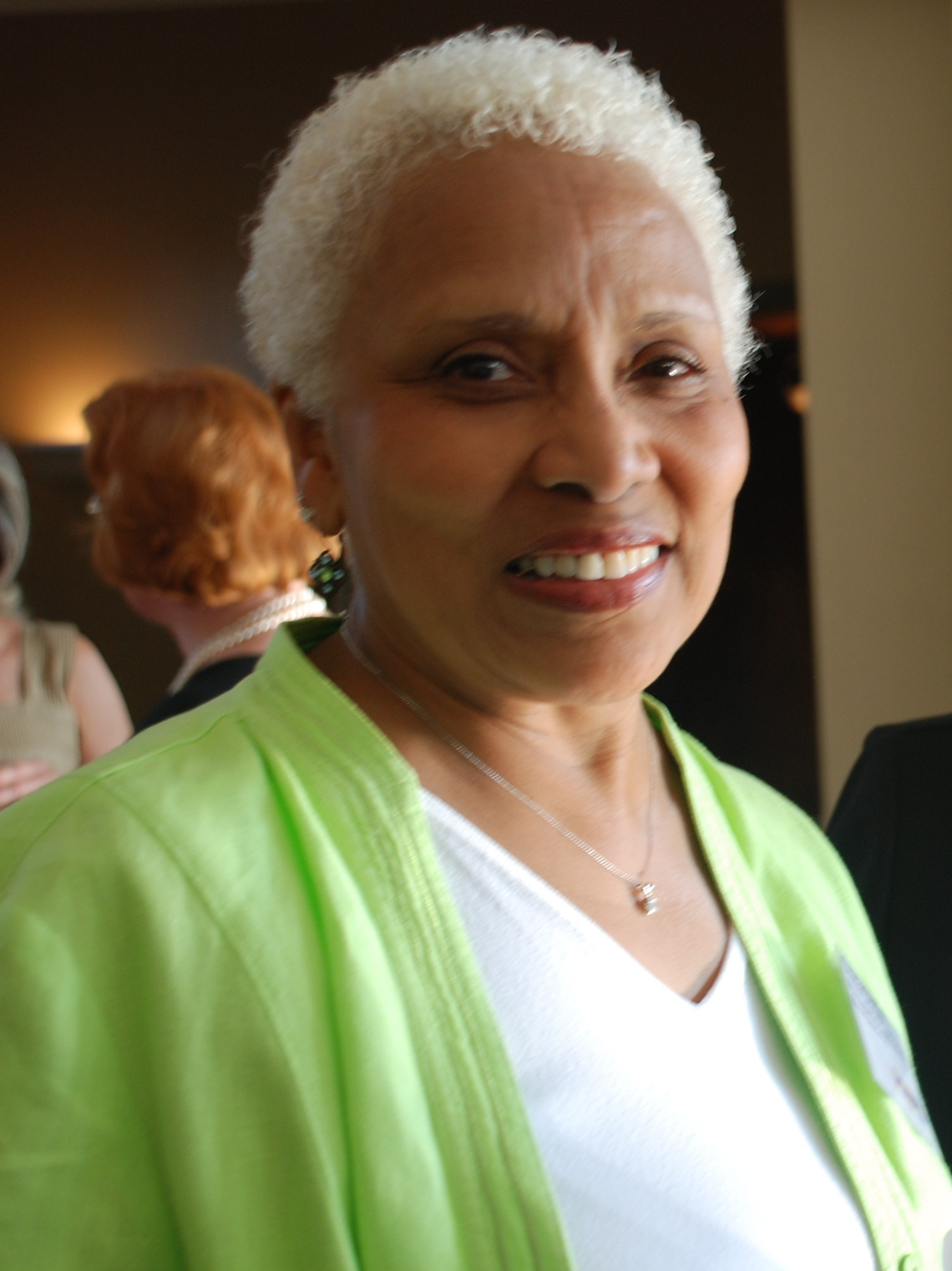

Minority Leader of the Georgia Senate
- In office January 11, 2021 – January 13, 2025
- Preceded by: Steve Henson
- Succeeded by: Harold Jones

Member of the Georgia Senate from the 55th district
- In office January 11, 1999 – January 13, 2025
- Preceded by: Steve Henson
- Succeeded by: Randal Mangham

Personal details
- Born: December 25, 1941 (age 84) Daytona Beach, Florida, U.S.
- Party: Democratic
- Education: Perimeter College

Gloria Singleton Butler (born December 25, 1941) is an American retired politician from the state of Georgia. A member of the Democratic Party, Butler served as a member of the Georgia State Senate from 1999 to 2025. She represented the 55th district, which encompasses parts of DeKalb County and Gwinnett County. Butler served as Senate Minority Leader from 2021 to 2025.

== Early life and education ==
Gloria S. Butler graduated from Perimeter College with an associate degree in business administration. She is a member of the National Council of Negro Women, DeKalb Women's Political Caucus, National Women's Political Caucus (governing member), and the DeKalb County NAACP (lifetime member).

== Political career ==
Butler was elected in 1998 and sworn into the Senate in 1999. She served thirteen terms in the Georgia State Senate.

On November 16, 2020, Butler was elected Senate Minority Leader, becoming the first woman to lead a party caucus in the Senate. Butler was the second woman to lead a party caucus in either chamber after Stacey Abrams, who led the House Democratic minority from 2011 to 2017.

Butler retired from the Senate in 2024.

== See also ==
- List of state government committees (Georgia)

Georgia State Senate
Preceded by Steve Henson	Minority Leader of the Georgia Senate; 2021–2025	Succeeded by Harold V. Jones II
