= Georgia State Senate =

Upper house of the Georgia General Assembly

- Georgia General Assembly

Type
- Type: Upper house
- Term limits: None

History
- New session started: January 13, 2025

Leadership
- President: Burt Jones (R) since January 9, 2023
- President pro tempore: Larry Walker III (R) since January 12, 2026
- Majority Leader: Jason Anavitarte (R) since June 17, 2025
- Minority Leader: Harold V. Jones II (D) since January 13, 2025

Structure
- Seats: 56
- Political groups: Majority: Republican (33); Minority: Democratic (23)
- Length of term: 2 years
- Authority: Article III, Georgia Constitution
- Salary: $17,342/year + per diem

Elections
- Last election: November 5, 2024 (56 seats)
- Next election: November 3, 2026 (56 seats)
- Redistricting: Legislative control

Meeting place
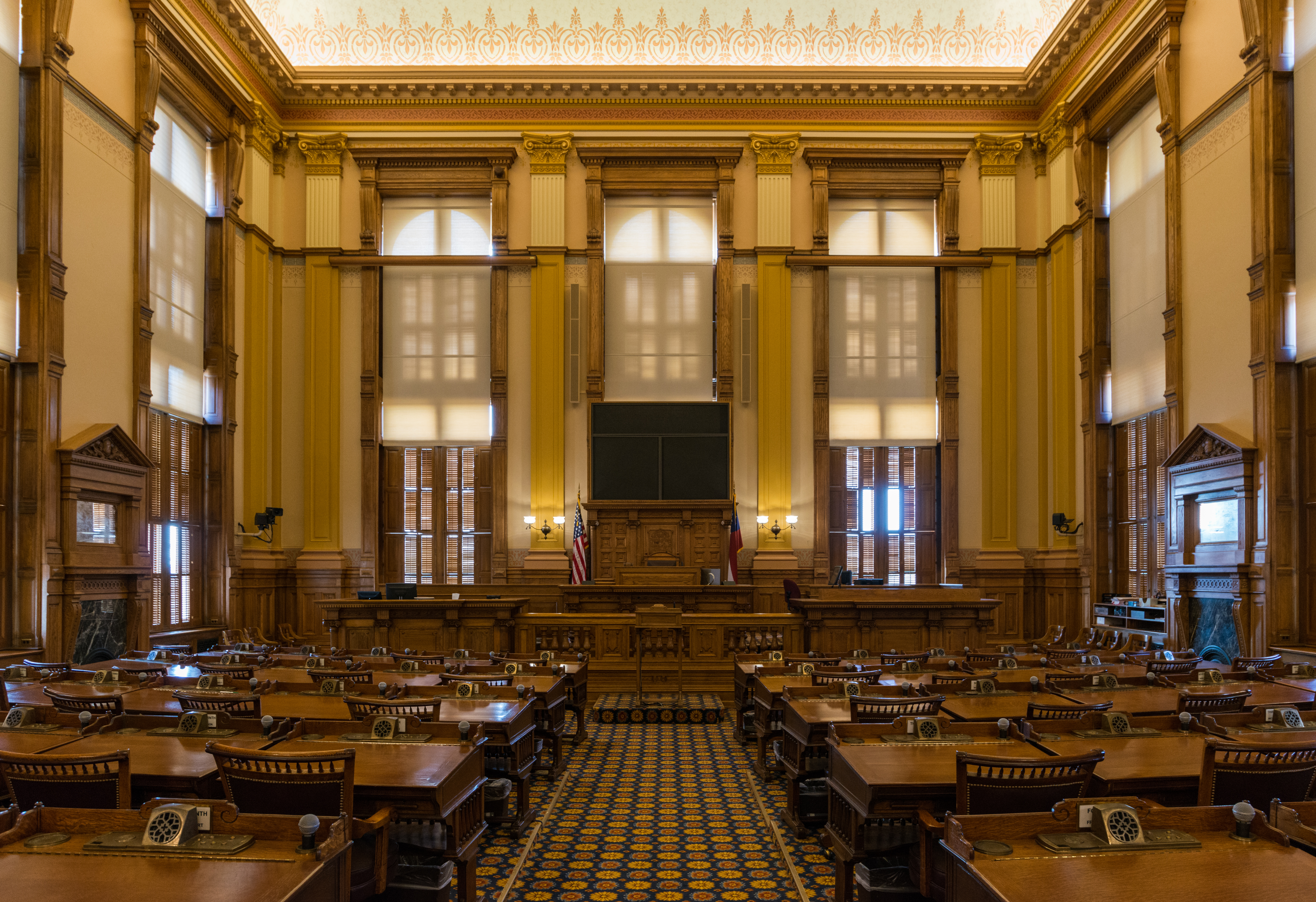
- State Senate Chamber; Georgia Capitol; Atlanta, Georgia

Website
- legis.ga.gov/senate

The Georgia State Senate is the upper house of the Georgia General Assembly, in the U.S. state of Georgia. The Georgia State Senate and the lower house of the General Assembly, the Georgia House of Representatives, comprise the bicameral legislature of the state. Combined, the Senate and the House maintain authority under Article III. of the 1983 Constitution of Georgia to enact laws "necessary and proper for the welfare of the state", although state law is subordinate to the state constitution, the United States Constitution, and federal law.

Like most upper houses in the United States, the Senate has the exclusive power to confirm various appointments made by the governor of Georgia, and to try cases of impeachment brought by the House. The Senate is often considered a springboard for those ultimately seeking higher office; all of the state's most recent governors have served in the State Senate.

== Legal provisions ==
The Georgia State Senate is the upper house of the Georgia General Assembly, with the lower house being the Georgia House of Representatives. Both bodies are constitutionally required to convene annually at the Georgia State Capitol in Atlanta. The General Assembly begins each yearly session on the second Monday in January. From that date of convention, sessions last for 40 legislative days.

The General Assembly may call for special sessions by a three-fifths vote of the members in each chamber. Special sessions in Georgia may span a maximum of 40 days.

=== Membership requirements ===
The Georgia State Senate consists of 56 members, each representing a single-member legislative district of equal size with the others. State senators serve a term length of two years, with elections being held in even-numbered years. Senators officially assume their positions on the second Monday in January following their election.

To serve in the Senate, an individual must have attained the age of 25. The person must also be a qualified voter who has resided in the state of Georgia for at least two years. Unlike most states, senators are not required to have lived in their districts for a specific period of time before running.

=== Leadership ===
The formal President of the State Senate is the Lieutenant Governor of Georgia, who is elected statewide every four years. Other important figures in the Senate include the President pro tempore (who is elected by all members of the Senate), as well as the Majority Leader, Majority Whip, and Majority Caucus Chair (each of whom are elected by the majority of what is currently the Republican caucus).

The minority party is headed by the Minority Leader, who is elected by the minority party caucus.

=== Compensation ===
The current salary for state senators is $17,342. The Majority Leader and Minority Leader earn an additional $400 per month.

== Officers ==
The presiding officer of the Senate is the president of the Senate. A president pro tempore, usually a high-ranking member of the majority party, acts as president in case of the temporary disability of the president. In case of the death, resignation, or permanent disability of the President or in the event of the succession of the president to the executive power, the President pro tempore becomes President. The Senate also has as an officer, the secretary of the Senate.

As of February 2026, the majority and minority leadership is as follows:

Office	Officeholder	Party
Lt. governor and senate president	Burt Jones	Republican
President pro tempore	Larry Walker III	Republican
Majority leader	Jason Anavitarte	Republican
Majority whip	Randy Robertson	Republican
Majority caucus chairman	Shawn Still	Republican
Majority caucus vice-chairman	Clint Dixon	Republican
Majority caucus secretary	Kay Kirkpatrick	Republican
Minority leader	Harold V. Jones II	Democratic
Minority whip	Kim Jackson	Democratic
Minority caucus chair	Elena Parent	Democratic
Minority caucus vice-chair	Sonya Halpern	Democratic
Minority caucus vice-chair of finance	Nikki Merritt	Democratic
Minority caucus secretary	Nan Orrock	Democratic

== List of committees ==
- Administrative Affairs
- Agriculture and Consumer Affairs (chair, Russ Goodman)
- Appropriations (chair, Blake Tillery)
- Assignments
- Banking and Financial Institutions (chair, Carden Summers)
- Children and Families (chair, Kay Kirkpatrick)
- Economic Development and Tourism (chair, Brandon Beach)
- Education and Youth (chair, Clint Dixon)
- Ethics (chair, Max Burns)
- Finance
- Government Oversight
- Health and Human Services
- Higher Education (chair, Billy Hickman)
- Insurance and Labor (chair, Larry Walker III)
- Interstate Cooperation (chair, Colton Moore)
- Judiciary
- MARTOC
- Natural Resources and the Environment (chair, Lee Anderson)
- Public Safety
- Reapportionment and Redistricting (chair, Shelly Echols)
- Regulated Industries and Utilities
- Retirement (chair, Rick Williams)
- Rules (chair, Matt Brass)
- Science and Technology (chair, Chuck Payne)
- Special Judiciary
- State and Local Governmental Operations (chair, Frank Ginn)
- State Institutions and Property
- Transportation (chair, Greg Dolezal)
- Urban Affairs (chair, Donzella James)
- Veterans, Military, and Homeland Security (chair, Mike Dugan)

== Composition ==
Map of current partisan composition of legislative districts for the State Senate: Democratic senator Republican senator Vacant seat

According to the state constitution of 1983, this body is to be composed of no more than 56 members elected for two-year terms. Current state law provides for 56 members. Elections are held the first Tuesday after the first Monday in November in even-numbered years.

Senators must be at least 25 years old, a citizen of the United States, and a resident of Georgia for two years and their senatorial district for one year (preceding the election). The highest position in the Senate is the President of the Senate, a position currently held by Lieutenant Governor Burt Jones. The second-highest position is president pro tempore, currently held by Senator Larry Walker III.

↓
33	23
Republican	Democratic

Affiliation	Party (Shading indicates majority caucus)			Total	Vacant
Affiliation	Republican		Democratic	Total	Vacant
End of 155th Assembly	35		21	56	0
End of 156th Assembly	34		22	56	0
Beginning of 157th Assembly	33		23	56	0
End of 157th (Note: Republican Colton Moore (District 53) was removed from Republican caucus September 28, 2023)	32	1	23	56	0
Beginning of 158th Assembly	32	1	23	56	0
May 4, 2025 (Note: Republican Brandon Beach (District 21) resigned on May 4, 2025 after being appointed as Treasurer of the United States)	31	1	23	55	1
September 10, 2025 (Note: Democrat Jason Esteves (District 35) resigned to focus on his campaign for governor.)	31	1	22	54	2
October 14, 2025 (Note: Republican Jason Dickerson sworn in to succeed Beach.)	32	1	22	55	1
December 8, 2025 (Note: Republican John F. Kennedy (District 18) resigned to focus on his campaign for lieutenant governor.)	31	1	22	54	2
December 31, 2025 (Note: Democrat Jaha Howard sworn in to succeed Esteves.)	31	1	23	55	1
January 13, 2026 (Note: Republican Colton Moore (District 53) resigned in order to run in a special election for Georgia's 14th congressional district.)	31	0	23	54	2
February 24, 2026 (Note: Republican Steven McNeel sworn in to succeed Kennedy.)	32	0	23	55	1
March 13, 2026 (Note: Democrat Nabilah Parkes (District 7) resigned to focus on her lieutenant gubernatorial campaign.)	32	0	22	54	2
April 23, 2026 (Note: Republican Lanny Thomas sworn in to succeed Moore.)	33	0	22	55	1
June 26, 2026 (Note: Democrat Adrienne White sworn in to succeed Parkes.)	33	0	23	56	0
Latest voting share	58.9%	0%	41.1%		

== List of current senators ==
As of June 2026, the Georgia State Senate is composed of 56 members:

District	Name	Party	Start	Residence	Counties
1	Ben Watson	Republican	2015	Savannah	Bryan, Liberty, part of Chatham
2	Derek Mallow	Democratic	2023	Savannah	Part of Chatham
3	Mike Hodges	Republican	2023	Brunswick	Brantley, Camden, Charlton, Glynn, McIntosh, part of Ware
4	Billy Hickman	Republican	2020	Statesboro	Bulloch, Candler, Effingham, Evans, part of Chatham
5	Sheikh Rahman	Democratic	2019	Lawrenceville	Part of Gwinnett
6	Matt Brass	Republican	2017	Newnan	Coweta, Heard, part of Carroll
7	Adrienne White	Democratic	2026	Duluth	Part of Gwinnett
8	Russ Goodman	Republican	2021	Cogdell	Atkinson, Clinch, Echols, Lanier, Lowndes, Pierce, part of Ware
9	Nikki Merritt	Democratic	2021	Grayson	Part of Gwinnett
10	Emanuel Jones	Democratic	2005	Decatur	Parts of DeKalb and Henry
11	Sam Watson	Republican	2023	Moultrie	Brooks, Colquitt, Cook, Decatur, Grady, Seminole, Thomas
12	Freddie Sims	Democratic	2009	Dawson	Baker, Calhoun, Clay, Dougherty, Early, Miller, Mitchell, Quitman, Randolph, Stewart, Sumter, Terrell, Webster
13	Carden Summers	Republican	2020	Cordele	Ben Hill, Berrien, Crisp, Irwin, Lee, Tift, Turner, Worth, part of Coffee
14	Josh McLaurin	Democratic	2023	Sandy Springs	Part of Fulton
15	Ed Harbison	Democratic	1993	Columbus	Chattahoochee, Macon, Marion, Schley, Talbot, Taylor, part of Muscogee
16	Marty Harbin	Republican	2015	Tyrone	Lamar, Pike, Spalding, part of Fayette
17	Gail Davenport	Democratic	2007	Jonesboro	Parts of Clayton and Henry
18	Steven McNeel	Republican	2026	Macon	Crawford, Monroe, Peach, Upson, parts of Bibb and Houston
19	Blake Tillery	Republican	2017	Vidalia	Appling, Bacon, Jeff Davis, Long, Montgomery, Tattnall, Telfair, Toombs, Wayne, Wheeler, part of Coffee
20	Larry Walker III	Republican	2015	Perry	Bleckley, Dodge, Dooly, Laurens, Pulaski, Treutlen, Wilcox, part of Houston
21	Jason Dickerson	Republican	2025	Canton	Parts of Cherokee and Fulton
22	Harold V. Jones II	Democratic	2015	Augusta	Part of Richmond
23	Max Burns	Republican	2021	Sylvania	Burke, Emanuel, Glascock, Jefferson, Jenkins, McDuffie, Screven, Taliaferro, Warren, parts of Columbia and Richmond
24	Lee Anderson	Republican	2017	Grovetown	Elbert, Greene, Hart, Lincoln, Oglethorpe, Wilkes, part of Columbia
25	Rick Williams	Republican	2023	Milledgeville	Baldwin, Butts, Jasper, Jones, Putnam, parts of Bibb and Henry
26	David Lucas	Democratic	2013	Macon	Hancock, Johnson, Twiggs, Washington, Wilkinson, parts of Bibb and Houston
27	Greg Dolezal	Republican	2019	Cumming	Part of Forsyth
28	Donzella James	Democratic	2009	Atlanta	Parts of Cobb, Douglas, and Fulton
29	Randy Robertson	Republican	2019	Cataula	Harris, Meriwether, Troup, part of Muscogee
30	Tim Bearden	Republican	2024	Carrollton	Haralson, parts of Carroll, Douglas, and Paulding
31	Jason Anavitarte	Republican	2021	Dallas	Polk, part of Paulding
32	Kay Kirkpatrick	Republican	2017	Marietta	Parts Cherokee and Cobb
33	Michael Rhett	Democratic	2015	Marietta	Part of Cobb
34	Kenya Wicks	Democratic	2025	Fayetteville	Parts of Clayton and Fayette
35	Jaha Howard	Democratic	2025	Smyrna	Parts of Cobb and Fulton
36	Nan Orrock	Democratic	2007	Atlanta	Part of Fulton
37	Ed Setzler	Republican	2023	Acworth	Parts of Bartow and Cobb
38	RaShaun Kemp	Democratic	2025	Atlanta	Part of Fulton
39	Sonya Halpern	Democratic	2021	Atlanta	Part of Fulton
40	Sally Harrell	Democratic	2019	Atlanta	Parts of DeKalb and Gwinnett
41	Kim Jackson	Democratic	2021	Stone Mountain	Part of DeKalb
42	Brian Strickland	Republican	2018	McDonough	Morgan, parts of Henry, Newton, and Walton
43	Tonya Anderson	Democratic	2017	Lithonia	Rockdale, parts of DeKalb, Gwinnett, and Newton
44	Elena Parent	Democratic	2015	Atlanta	Parts of Clayton and DeKalb
45	Clint Dixon	Republican	2021	Buford	Parts of Barrow and Gwinnett
46	Bill Cowsert	Republican	2007	Athens	Parts of Barrow, Clarke, Gwinnett, Oconee, and Walton
47	Frank Ginn	Republican	2011	Danielsville	Madison, parts of Barrow, Clarke, and Jackson
48	Shawn Still	Republican	2023	Suwanee	Parts of Forsyth, Fulton, and Gwinnett
49	Drew Echols	Republican	2025	Gainesville	Part of Hall
50	Bo Hatchett	Republican	2021	Cornelia	Banks, Franklin, Habersham, Rabun, Stephens, Towns, parts of Hall, Jackson, and White
51	Steve Gooch	Republican	2011	Dahlonega	Dawson, Fannin, Gilmer, Lumpkin, Pickens, Union, part of White
52	Chuck Hufstetler	Republican	2013	Rome	Parts of Bartow, Floyd, and Gordon
53	Lanny Thomas	Republican	2026	Trion	Catoosa, Chattooga, Dade, Walker, part of Floyd
54	Chuck Payne	Republican	2017	Dalton	Murray, Whitfield, part of Gordon
55	Randal Mangham	Democratic	2025	Stone Mountain	Parts of DeKalb and Gwinnett
56	John Albers	Republican	2011	Roswell	Parts of Cherokee, Cobb, and Fulton

== See also ==
- Georgia General Assembly
- Georgia House of Representatives
- List of former members of the Georgia State Senate
- Recent terms of the General Assembly:
  - 157th Georgia General Assembly (2023–2024)
  - 156th Georgia General Assembly (2021–2023)
  - 155th Georgia General Assembly (2019–2021)
  - 154th Georgia General Assembly (2017–2018)
  - 153rd Georgia General Assembly (2015–2016)
- List of Georgia state legislatures
