= Georgia's 11th House of Representatives district =

State district in Georgia, USA

Georgia's 11th State House of Representatives district
Representative
| Rick Jasperse; R–Jasper |
- Demographics: 90.9% White; 1.6% Black; 6.1% Hispanic; 0.4% Asian
- Population: 54,146

District 11 elects one member of the Georgia House of Representatives. It contains the entirety of Pickens County as well as parts of Cherokee County and Forsyth County.

== Members ==
- Tom Graves (2005–2010)
- Rick Jasperse (since 2010)
