= Georgia's 4th House of Representatives district =

State district in Georgia, USA

Georgia's 4th State House of Representatives district
Representative
Kasey Carpenter; R–Dalton
- Demographics: 48.6% White; 5.3% Black; 42.8% Hispanic; 2.1% Asian
- Population: 53,990

District 4 elects one member of the Georgia House of Representatives. It contains parts of Whitfield County.

== Members ==
- Bruce Broadrick (until 2017 )
- Kasey Carpenter (since 2017)
