= Georgia's 54th Senate district =

State district in Georgia, USA

Georgia's 54th State Senate district
Senator
Chuck Payne; R–Dalton
- Demographics: 71.3% White; 2.8% Black; 23.6% Hispanic; 1.0% Asian
- Population: 174,111

District 54 of the Georgia Senate elects one member of the Georgia State Senate. It contains the entirety of Murray County and Whitfield County, as well as parts of Gordon County.

== State senators ==
- Don Thomas (until 2011)
- Charlie Bethel (2011–2016)
- Chuck Payne (since 2017)
