= Harold V. Jones II =

American politician (born 1969)

Harold Jones
- Official portrait, 2024

Minority Leader of the Georgia State Senate
- Incumbent
- Assumed office January 13, 2025
- Preceded by: Gloria Butler

Member of the Georgia State Senate from the 22nd district
- Incumbent
- Assumed office January 12, 2015
- Preceded by: Hardie Davis

Personal details
- Born: August 1, 1969 (age 57)
- Party: Democratic
- Education: South Carolina State (BA); North Carolina Central (JD)
- Website: State senate website

Harold Vernon Jones II (born August 1, 1969) is an American politician who has served in the Georgia State Senate from the 22nd district since 2015.

State Senator Jones was elected Georgia Senate Minority Leader in 2024.

Georgia State Senate
Preceded by Gloria Butler	Minority Leader of the Georgia Senate; 2025–present	Incumbent
