= Georgia's 77th House of Representatives district =

State district in Georgia, USA

Georgia's 77th State House of Representatives district
Representative
Rhonda Burnough; D–Riverdale
- Demographics: 8.2% White; 71.1% Black; 15.3% Hispanic; 3.0% Asian
- Population: 57,340

District 77 elects one member of the Georgia House of Representatives. It contains parts of Clayton County.

== Members ==
- Darryl Jordan (until 2017)
- Rhonda Burnough (since 2017)
