= Georgia's 88th House of Representatives district =

American legislative district

Georgia's 88th State House of Representatives district
Representative
Billy Mitchell; D–Stone Mountain

Georgia's 88th House district elects one member of the Georgia House of Representatives. Its current representative is Democrat Billy Mitchell.
