= Carl Gilliard (politician) =

American politician

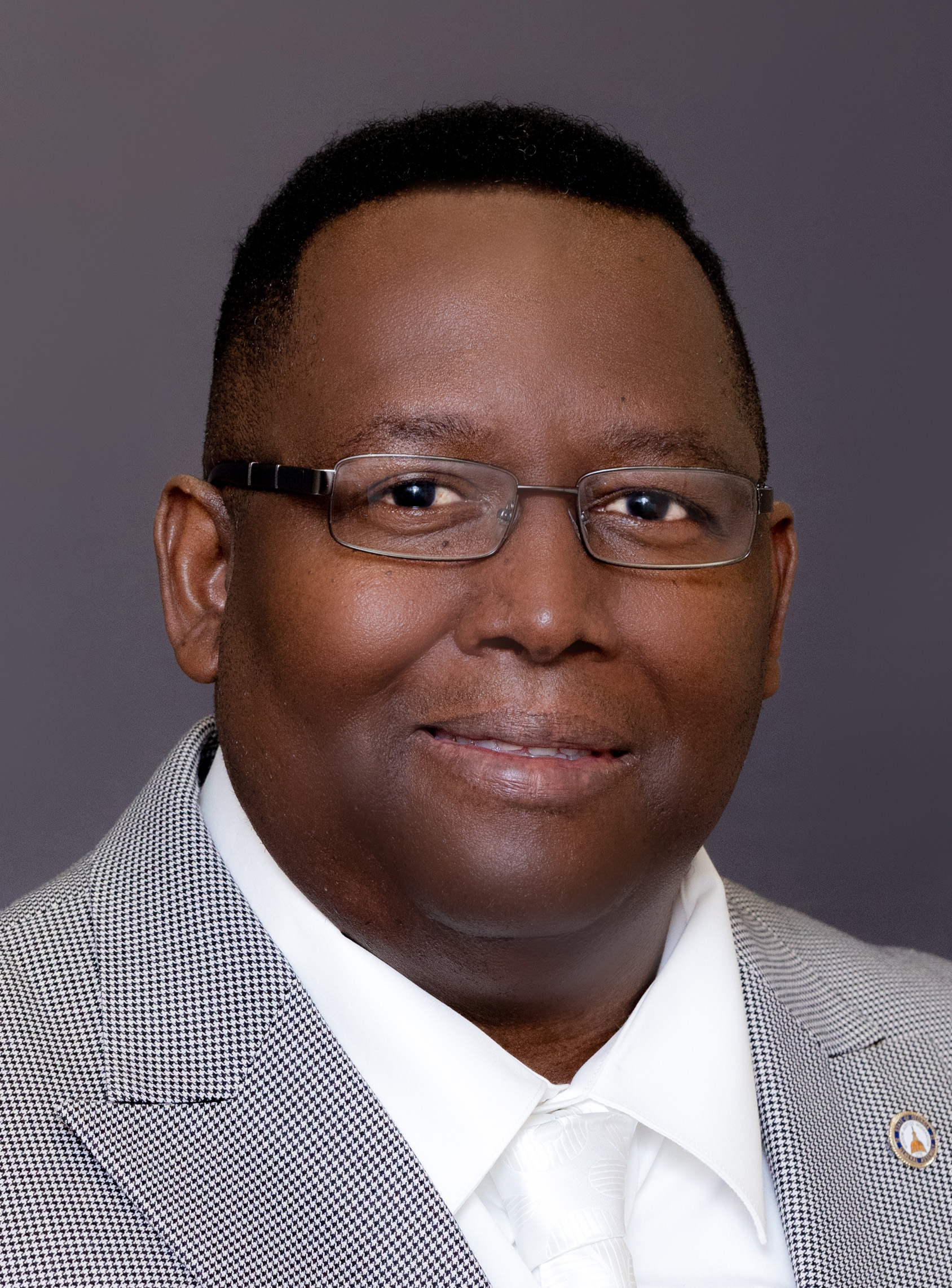

Member of the Georgia House of Representatives from the 162nd district
- Incumbent
- Assumed office May 5, 2016

Personal details
- Born: Carl Wayne Gilliard; July 31, 1963 (age 62)
- Party: Democratic
- Spouse: Lashawnda

Carl Wayne Gilliard (born July 31, 1963) is an American politician from Georgia. Gilliard is a Democratic member of the Georgia House of Representatives for District 162.
