= Georgia's 179th House of Representatives district =

State district in Georgia, USA

Georgia's 179th State House of Representatives district
Representative
Rick Townsend; R–Brunswick
- Demographics: 58.1% White; 31.2% Black; 6.7% Hispanic; 1.1% Asian
- Population: 54,834

District 179 elects one member of the Georgia House of Representatives. It contains parts of Glynn County.

== Members ==
- Alex Atwood (2011–2017)
- Don Hogan (2017–2023)
- Rick Townsend (since 2023)
