= Billy Mitchell (politician) =

American politician

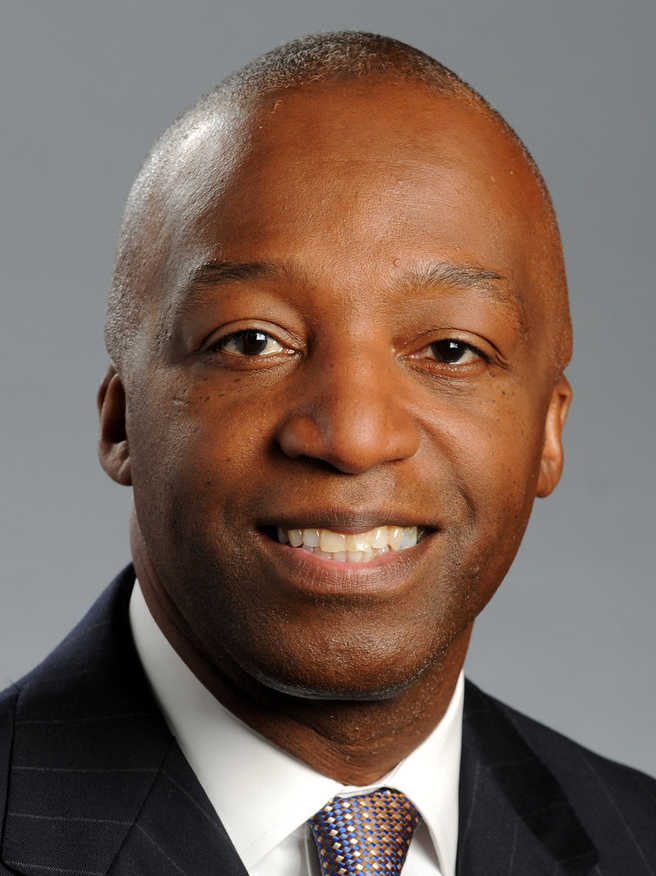

Member of the Georgia House of Representatives
- Incumbent
- Assumed office January 13, 2003
- Preceded by: District established
- Constituency: 61st district (2003–2005); 88th district (2005–present)

Personal details
- Born: William Weston Mitchell; November 12, 1956 (age 69) Savannah, Georgia, U.S.
- Party: Democratic
- Spouse: Shawn
- Education: Rutgers University; University of Southern California; Atlanta Law School

William Weston Mitchell (born November 12, 1956) is a Democratic member of the Georgia House of Representatives, serving since 2003. Mitchell previously served on the Stone Mountain City Council from 1995 to 2002.
