= Rick Jasperse =

American politician

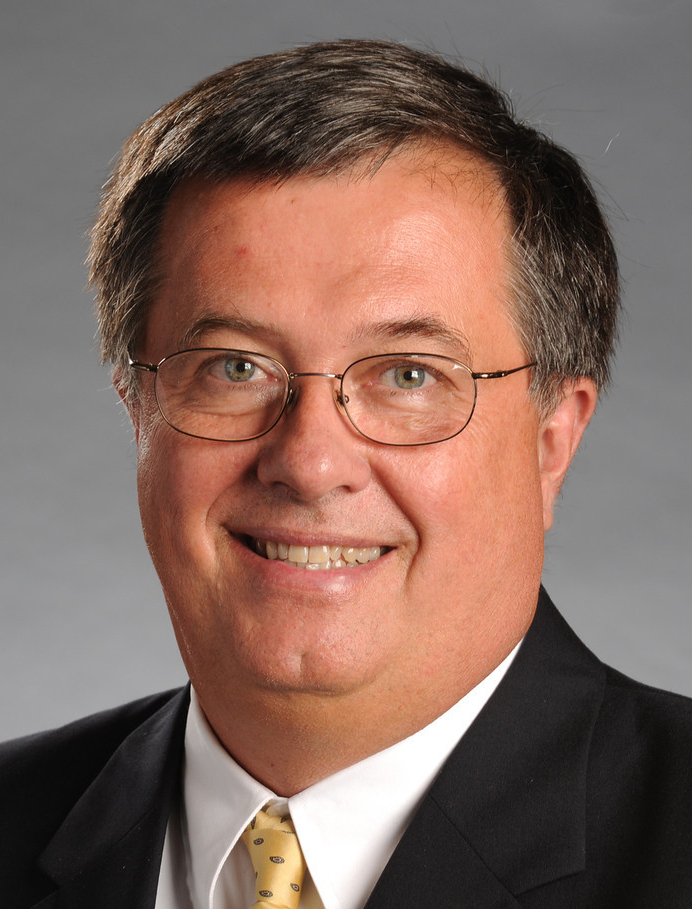

Member of the Georgia House of Representatives from the 11th district
- Incumbent
- Assumed office May 25, 2010
- Preceded by: Tom Graves

Personal details
- Born: July 22, 1956 (age 70)
- Party: Republican

Richard Clark Jasperse (born July 22, 1956) is an American politician who has served in the Georgia House of Representatives for District 11 since 2010.
