= 2026 Georgia House of Representatives election =

2026 Georgia House of Representatives elections
- November 3, 2026

All 180 seats in the Georgia House of Representatives 91 seats needed for a majority
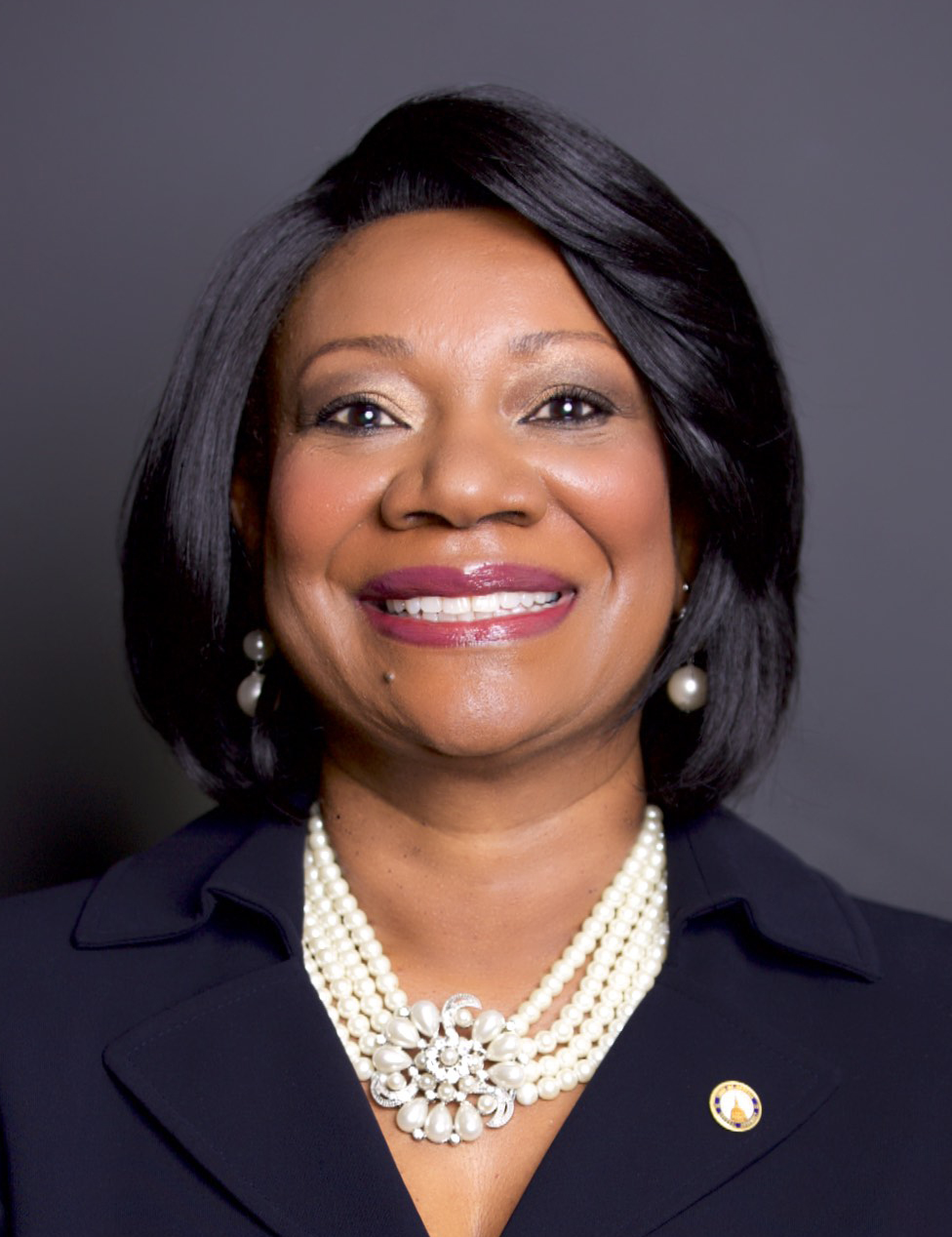

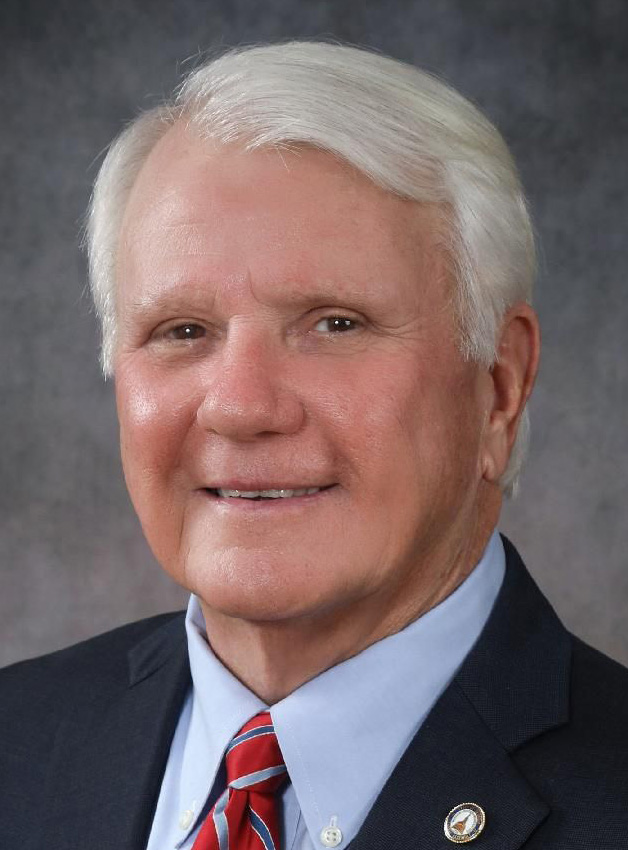
	Majority party	Minority party
Leader	Carolyn Hugley	Jon Burns
Party	Democratic	Republican
Leader since	January 13, 2025	January 9, 2023
Leader's seat	141st– Columbus	159th – Newington
Last election	80	100
Seats before	81	99
Seats won	92	87
Seat change	▲11	▼11
Popular vote	2,207,118	1,753,546
Percentage	55.66%	44.22%
Swing	▲10.30%	▼10.42%
- Results by gains and holds: Republican gain Democratic gain Republican hold Democratic hold Awaiting run-off election
Speaker before election
Jon Burns
Republican
Elected Speaker
Democratic

The 2026 Georgia House of Representatives election took place on November 3, 2026. All 180 seats in the Georgia House of Representatives were up for election. Prior to the election, 99 seats were held by Republicans and 81 seats are held by Democrats.

The election was held alongside the Georgia State Senate election and other elections in the U.S. state of Georgia and the other United States.

For the first time since 2002 Georgia House of Representatives election, Democrats won the chamber.

== Retirements ==
=== Democratic ===
- District 58: Park Cannon is retiring
- District 62: Tanya F. Miller is retiring to run for Attorney General.
- District 68: Derrick Jackson is retiring to run for Governor.
- District 90: Saira Draper is retiring to run for State Senate.
- District 97: Ruwa Romman is retiring to run for State Senate.
- District 108: Jasmine Clark is retiring to run for U.S. House of Representatives.
- District 109: Dewey McClain is retiring.
- District 113: Sharon Henderson is retiring to run for State Senate.
- District 128: Mack Jackson is retiring.
- District 140: Teddy Reese is retiring to run for State Senate.
- District 162: Carl Gilliard is retiring.
- District 165: Edna Jackson is retiring.

=== Republican ===
- District 31: Emory Dunahoo is retiring.
- District 47: Jan Jones is retiring.
- District 70: Lynn Smith is retiring.
- District 100: David Clark is retiring to run for Lieutenant Governor.
- District 114: Tim Fleming is retiring to run for Secretary of State.
- District 120: Houston Gaines is retiring to run for U.S. House of Representatives.

== Incumbents defeated ==
=== In primaries ===
==== Republicans ====
1. District 157: Bill Werkheiser lost renomination to Bradley Anderson.

==== Democrats ====
1. District 117: Mary Ann Santos lost renomination to Kim Thomas Smith.

== Special elections ==
Six special elections were held during the 158th Georgia General Assembly.

=== 2025 ===
==== House district 106 ====
A special election was held on November 4, 2025, in House District 106 to fill the vacancy left by Democrat Shelly Hutchinson's resignation on September 4, 2025. As no candidate received more than 50% of the vote, a runoff election between Democrats Marqus A. Cole and Akbar Ali was held on December 2, 2025, with Ali winning to serve the remainder of the 158th Georgia House of Representatives.

House district 106 special election
Party	Candidate	Votes	%
Democratic	Marqus A. Cole	3,171	38.96
Democratic	Muhammad Akbar Ali	2,613	32.10
Republican	Jamie Parker	2,355	28.94
Total votes		8,139	100.00

House district 106 special election runoff
Party	Candidate	Votes	%
Democratic	Muhammad Akbar Ali	949	54.45
Democratic	Marqus A. Cole	794	45.55
Total votes		1,743	100.00
Democratic hold			

==== House district 23 ====
A special election was held on December 9, 2025, in House District 23 to fill the vacancy left by Republican Mandi Ballinger's death on October 12, 2025. As no candidate received more than 50% of the vote, a runoff election between Republican Bill Fincher and Democrat Scott Sanders was held on January 6, 2026, with Fincher winning to serve the remainder of the 158th Georgia House of Representatives.

House district 23 special election
Party	Candidate	Votes	%
Republican	Bill Fincher	1,373	27.38
Democratic	Scott Sanders	1,340	26.72
Republican	Brice Futch	1,118	22.29
Republican	Ann Gazell	608	12.12
Republican	Rajpal "Raj" Sagoo	560	11.17
Republican	William Ware	16	0.32
Total votes		5,015	100.00

House district 23 special election runoff
Party	Candidate	Votes	%
Republican	Bill Fincher	4,345	71.38
Democratic	Scott Sanders	1,742	28.62
Total votes		6,087	100.00
Republican hold			

==== House district 121 ====
A special election was held on December 9, 2025, in House District 121 to fill the vacancy left by Republican Marcus Wiedower's resignation on October 28, 2025. Democrat Eric Gisler was narrowly elected over Republican Mack Guest IV to serve the remainder of the 158th Georgia House of Representatives.

House district 121 special election
Party	Candidate	Votes	%
Democratic	Eric Gisler	5,874	50.86
Republican	Mack "Dutch" Guest IV	5,676	49.14
Total votes		11,550	100.00
Democratic gain from Republican			

=== 2026 ===
==== House district 94 ====
A special election was held on March 10, 2026, in House District 94 to fill the vacancy left by Democrat Karen Bennett's resignation on December 31, 2025. As no candidate received more than 50% of the vote, a runoff election between Democrats Venola Mason and Kelly Kautz was held on April 7, 2026, with Mason winning to serve the remainder of the 158th Georgia House of Representatives.

House district 94 special election
Party	Candidate	Votes	%
Democratic	Venola Mason	1,199	44.23
Democratic	Kelly Kautz	629	23.20
Democratic	Audrey Taylor Lux	442	16.30
Democratic	Ikenna Ugwumadu	441	16.27
Total votes		2,711	100.00

House district 94 special election runoff
Party	Candidate	Votes	%
Democratic	Venola Mason	1,132	68.48
Democratic	Kelly Kautz	521	31.52
Total votes		1,653	100.00
Democratic hold			

==== House district 130 ====
A special election was held on March 10, 2026, in House District 130 to fill the vacancy left by Democrat Lynn Heffner's resignation on January 4, 2026. As no candidate received more than 50% of the vote, a runoff election between Democrat Sheila Nelson and Republican Thomas D. McAdams was held on April 7, 2026, with Nelson winning to serve the remainder of the 158th Georgia House of Representatives.

House district 130 special election
Party	Candidate	Votes	%
Democratic	Sheila Clark Nelson	567	33.49
Republican	Thomas D. McAdams	340	20.08
Democratic	Karen Gordon	333	19.67
Democratic	Sha'Qunta "Q" Calles	236	13.94
Republican	David Carson	136	8.03
Democratic	LaFawn S. Pinkney-Mealing	81	4.79
Total votes		1,693	100.00

House district 130 special election runoff
Party	Candidate	Votes	%
Democratic	Sheila Clark Nelson	1,107	70.69
Republican	Thomas D. McAdams	459	29.31
Total votes		1,566	100.00
Democratic hold			

==== House district 177 ====
A special election was held on May 12, 2026, in House District 177 to fill the vacancy left by Democrat Dexter Sharper's resignation on March 9, 2026. As no candidate received more than 50% of the vote, a runoff election between Democrats Alvin Payton and Eric G. Howard was held on June 9, 2026, with Payton winning to serve the remainder of the 158th Georgia House of Representatives.

House district 177 special election
Party	Candidate	Votes	%
Democratic	Alvin Payton	587	35.77
Democratic	Eric G. Howard	325	19.80
Democratic	Kristina Cheek McBride	296	18.04
Independent	Tim Huff	230	14.02
Democratic	Blake Alexander Robinson	203	12.37
Total votes		1,641	100.00

House district 177 special election runoff
Party	Candidate	Votes	%
Democratic	Alvin Payton	371	67.33
Democratic	Eric G. Howard	180	32.67
Total votes		551	100.00
Democratic hold			

== Predictions ==
In October 2025, The Atlanta Journal-Constitution identified House Districts 105, 99, 53, and 48 among five districts most likely to flip from Republican to Democratic control in 2026.

Source	Ranking	As of
Sabato's Crystal Ball	Lean R	October 16, 2026
State Navigate	Lean R	October 28, 2026

== Polling ==
Poll source	Date(s) administered	Sample size	Margin of error	Generic Republican	Generic Democrat	Undecided
State Navigate	October 23–27, 2026	679 (LV)	± 3.8%	44%	51%	5%
State Navigate	July 10–13, 2026	448 (LV)	± 4.6%	43% (Note: With voters who lean towards a given party)	51%	6%
State Navigate	July 10–13, 2026	448 (LV)	± 4.6%	43%	49%	8%

== Summary by district ==
District	2024 Pres.	Incumbent	Party	Elected	Outcome	Margin
1	R+57.2	Mike Cameron	Rep	Mike Cameron	Rep hold	R+46.2
2	R+62.5	Steve Tarvin	Rep	Steve Tarvin	Rep hold	R+51.2
3	R+53.9	Mitchell Horner	Rep	Mitchell Horner	Rep hold	R+38.5
4	R+28.6	Kasey Carpenter	Rep	Kasey Carpenter	Rep hold	R+3.6
5	R+63.0	Matt Barton	Rep	Matt Barton	Rep hold	R+48.3
6	R+69.0	Jason Ridley	Rep	Jason Ridley	Rep hold	R+55.2
7	R+63.8	Johnny Chastain	Rep	Johnny Chastain	Rep hold	uncontested
8	R+64.2	Stan Gunter	Rep	Stan Gunter	Rep hold	R+62.5
9	R+64.2	Will Wade†	Rep	Chris Dockery	Rep hold	R+55.8
10	R+62.6	Victor Anderson	Rep	Victor Anderson	Rep hold	R+54.8
11	R+61.5	Rick Jasperse	Rep	Rick Jasperse	Rep hold	R+54.5
12	R+57.9	Eddie Lumsden	Rep	Eddie Lumsden	Rep hold	R+48.2
13	R+31.5	Katie Dempsey	Rep	Katie Dempsey	Rep hold	R+18.7
14	R+60.7	Mitchell Scoggins	Rep	Mitchell Scoggins	Rep hold	R+51.4
15	R+42.5	Matthew Gambill	Rep	Matthew Gambill	Rep hold	R+31.4
16	R+55.9	Trey Kelley	Rep	Trey Kelley	Rep hold	R+43.0
17	R+24.9	Martin Momtahan	Rep	Martin Momtahan	Rep hold	R+4.8
18	R+66.4	Tyler Smith	Rep	Tyler Smith	Rep hold	R+60.5
19	R+10.1	Joseph Gullett	Rep	Cynthia Starke-Jones	Dem flip	D+3.4
20	R+32.1	Charlice Byrd	Rep	Charlice Byrd	Rep hold	R+20.2
21	R+42.7	Brad Thomas	Rep	Brad Thomas	Rep hold	R+36.1
22	R+16.2	Jordan Ridley	Rep	Jordan Ridley	Rep hold	R+1.0
23	R+46.8	Bill Fincher	Rep	Bill Fincher	Rep hold	R+40.3
24	R+28.7	Carter Barrett	Rep	Carter Barrett	Rep hold	R+15.5
25	R+11.9	Todd Jones	Rep	Todd Jones	Rep hold	R+3.2
26	R+30.9	Lauren McDonald	Rep	Lauren McDonald	Rep hold	R+23.3
27	R+62.5	Lee Hawkins	Rep	Lee Hawkins	Rep hold	R+56.8
28	R+51.1	Brent Cox	Rep	Brent Cox	Rep hold	R+44.3
29	R+18.1	Matt Dubnik	Rep	Scott Soracco	Dem flip	D+0.8
30	R+41.4	Derrick McCollum	Rep	Derrick McCollum	Rep hold	R+29.4
31	R+49.7	Emory Dunahoo†	Rep	Chad Bingham	Rep hold	uncontested
32	R+67.4	Chris Erwin	Rep	Chris Erwin	Rep hold	R+58.0
33	R+64.6	Alan Powell	Rep	Alan Powell	Rep hold	uncontested
34	R+8.8	Devan Seabaugh	Rep	Devan Seabaugh	Rep hold	R+2.6
35	D+20.0	Lisa Campbell	Dem	Lisa Campbell	Dem hold	D+42.3
36	R+18.7	Ginny Ehrhart	Rep	Ginny Ehrhart	Rep hold	R+10.4
37	D+17.4	Mary Frances Williams	Dem	Mary Frances Williams	Dem hold	uncontested
38	D+45.3	David Wilkerson	Dem	David Wilkerson	Dem hold	uncontested
39	D+56.5	Terry Cummings	Dem	Terry Cummings	Dem hold	uncontested
40	R+15.5	Kimberly New	Rep	Elisa Lassiter	Dem flip	D+1.9
41	D+40.2	Michael Smith	Dem	Michael Smith	Dem hold	uncontested
42	D+34.2	Gabriel Sanchez	Dem	Gabriel Sanchez	Dem hold	D+48.4
43	D+25.0	Solomon Adesanya	Dem	Solomon Adesanya	Dem hold	uncontested
44	R+8.8	Don Parsons	Rep	Danielle Bell	Dem flip	D+4.0
45	R+2.7	Sharon Cooper	Rep	Sharon Cooper	Rep hold	R+3.7
46	R+8.5	John Carson	Rep	John Carson	Rep hold	R+3.4
47	R+14.7	Jan Jones†	Rep	Jack Miller	Rep hold	R+7.7
48	D+1.1	Scott Hilton	Rep	Adam Cleveland	Dem flip	D+1.6
49	R+6.3	Chuck Martin	Rep	Chuck Martin	Rep hold	R+4.4
50	D+13.0	Michelle Au	Dem	Michelle Au	Dem hold	D+28.0
51	D+18.8	Esther Panitch	Dem	Esther Panitch	Dem hold	D+28.8
52	D+26.5	Shea Roberts	Dem	Shea Roberts	Dem hold	uncontested
53	D+6.9	Deborah Silcox	Rep	Beth Fuller	Dem flip	D+2.4
54	D+23.8	Betsy Holland	Dem	Betsy Holland	Dem hold	D+31.7
55	D+60.5	Inga Willis	Dem	Inga Willis	Dem hold	D+65.9
56	D+77.4	Bryce Berry	Dem	Bryce Berry	Dem hold	uncontested
57	D+61.2	Stacey Evans	Dem	Stacey Evans	Dem hold	D+68.4
58	D+77.7	Park Cannon†	Dem	Mathewos Samson	Dem hold	D+84.2
59	D+83.7	Phil Olaleye	Dem	Phil Olaleye	Dem hold	D+90.1
60	D+48.6	Sheila Jones	Dem	Sheila Jones	Dem hold	uncontested
61	D+57.4	Mekyah McQueen	Dem	Mekyah McQueen	Dem hold	D+66.1
62	D+82.5	Tanya F. Miller†	Dem	Kenn Collier	Dem hold	uncontested
63	D+78.9	Kim Schofield	Dem	Kim Schofield	Dem hold	uncontested
64	D+39.6	Sylvia Wayfer Baker	Dem	Sylvia Wayfer Baker	Dem hold	D+57.1
65	D+50.8	Robert Dawson	Dem	Robert Dawson	Dem hold	D+62.7
66	D+43.7	Kimberly Alexander	Dem	Kimberly Alexander	Dem hold	uncontested
67	D+33.6	Lydia Glaize	Dem	Lydia Glaize	Dem hold	D+48.6
68	D+30.9	Derrick Jackson†	Dem	Timoria McQueen Saba	Dem hold	uncontested
69	D+50.1	Debra Bazemore	Dem	Debra Bazemore	Dem hold	uncontested
70	R+22.2	Lynn Smith†	Rep	Melissa Stuckey	Rep hold	R+5.9
71	R+32.8	Justin Howard	Rep	Justin Howard	Rep hold	R+14.7
72	R+46.9	David Huddleston	Rep	David Huddleston	Rep hold	uncontested
73	R+25.1	Josh Bonner	Rep	Josh Bonner	Rep hold	R+19.4
74	D+54.3	Robert Flournoy	Dem	Robert Flournoy	Dem hold	uncontested
75	D+71.0	Eric Bell II	Dem	Eric Bell II	Dem hold	uncontested
76	D+67.2	Sandra Scott	Dem	Sandra Scott	Dem hold	uncontested
77	D+74.5	Rhonda Burnough	Dem	Rhonda Burnough	Dem hold	uncontested
78	D+49.9	Demetrius Douglas	Dem	Demetrius Douglas	Dem hold	uncontested
79	D+71.1	Yasmin Neal	Dem	Yasmin Neal	Dem hold	D+82.0
80	D+21.3	Long Tran	Dem	Long Tran	Dem hold	D+32.3
81	R+12.1	Noelle Kahaian	Rep	Mishael White	Dem flip	D+7.6
82	R+21.3	Karen Mathiak	Rep	Karen Mathiak	Rep hold	R+12.0
83	D+31.3	Karen Lupton	Dem	Karen Lupton	Dem hold	D+43.6
84	D+80.8	Mary Margaret Oliver	Dem	Mary Margaret Oliver	Dem hold	uncontested
85	D+69.0	Karla Drenner	Dem	Karla Drenner	Dem hold	D+80.9
86	D+61.7	Imani Barnes	Dem	Imani Barnes	Dem hold	uncontested
87	D+54.1	Viola Davis	Dem	Viola Davis	Dem hold	D+66.3
88	D+59.5	Billy Mitchell	Dem	Billy Mitchell	Dem hold	D+72.7
89	D+82.0	Omari Crawford	Dem	Omari Crawford	Dem hold	uncontested
90	D+80.9	Saira Draper†	Dem	Bentley Hudgins	Dem hold	D+84.9
91	D+61.5	Angela Moore	Dem	Angela Moore	Dem hold	uncontested
92	D+58.9	Rhonda Taylor	Dem	Rhonda Taylor	Dem hold	uncontested
93	D+53.1	Doreen Carter	Dem	Doreen Carter	Dem hold	uncontested
94	D+49.8	Venola Mason	Dem	Venola Mason	Dem hold	uncontested
95	D+59.7	Dar'shun Kendrick	Dem	Dar'shun Kendrick	Dem hold	D+74.2
96	D+26.4	Arlene Beckles	Dem	Arlene Beckles	Dem hold	uncontested
97	D+23.2	Ruwa Romman†	Dem	Jyot Singh	Dem hold	D+36.0
98	D+32.8	Marvin Lim	Dem	Marvin Lim	Dem hold	uncontested
99	D+5.8	Matt Reeves	Rep	Michelle Kang	Dem flip	D+16.9
100	R+19.2	David Clark†	Rep	Josh Clark	Rep hold	R+4.9
101	D+46.3	Scott Holcomb	Dem	Scott Holcomb	Dem hold	D+57.1
102	D+31.2	Gabe Okoye	Dem	Gabe Okoye	Dem hold	uncontested
103	R+13.2	Soo Hong	Rep	Chris Luchey	Dem flip	D+0.1 (temp)
104	R+22.5	Chuck Efstration	Rep	Chuck Efstration	Rep hold	uncontested
105	D+2.6	Sandy Donatucci	Rep	Farooq Mughal	Dem flip	D+21.5
106	D+19.7	Akbar Ali	Dem	Akbar Ali	Dem hold	uncontested
107	D+17.2	Sam Park	Dem	Sam Park	Dem hold	D+41.9
108	D+8.7	Jasmine Clark†	Dem	Rahim Asani	Dem hold	D+25.5
109	D+35.6	Dewey McClain†	Dem	Juan Estrada	Dem hold	uncontested
110	D+31.1	Segun Adeyina	Dem	Segun Adeyina	Dem hold	D+51.3
111	R+19.5	Reynaldo Martinez	Rep	Reynaldo Martinez	Rep hold	R+1.9
112	R+38.0	Bruce Williamson	Rep	Bruce Williamson	Rep hold	R+27.7
113	D+45.1	Sharon Henderson†	Dem	Karla Hooper	Dem hold	D+60.9
114	R+37.7	Tim Fleming†	Rep	Brett Mauldin	Rep hold	R+28.6
115	D+64.8	Regina Lewis-Ward	Dem	Regina Lewis-Ward	Dem hold	D+76.4
116	D+64.6	El-Mahdi Holly	Dem	El-Mahdi Holly	Dem hold	D+74.9
117	D+49.7	Mary Ann Santos	Dem	Kim Thomas Smith	Dem hold	uncontested
118	R+31.1	Clint Crowe	Rep	Clint Crowe	Rep hold	R+17.9
119	R+42.6	Holt Persinger	Rep	Holt Persinger	Rep hold	R+25.4
120	R+11.8	Houston Gaines†	Rep	Gary Black Jr.	Rep hold	R+3.9
121	R+12.1	Eric Gisler	Dem	Mack Guest IV	Rep flip	R+4.9
122	D+48.4	Spencer Frye	Dem	Spencer Frye	Dem hold	D+68.6
123	R+40.5	Rob Leverett	Rep	Rob Leverett	Rep hold	R+32.6
124	R+23.4	Trey Rhodes	Rep	Trey Rhodes	Rep hold	R+20.2
125	R+23.9	Gary Richardson	Rep	Gary Richardson	Rep hold	R+11.1
126	D+18.9	L.C. Myles	Dem	L.C. Myles	Dem hold	D+32.0
127	R+25.5	Mark Newton	Rep	Mark Newton	Rep hold	R+21.7
128	R+4.4	Mack Jackson†	Dem	Trey Sheppard	Rep flip	R+1.5
129	D+32.8	Karlton Howard	Dem	Karlton Howard	Dem hold	uncontested
130	D+35.9	Sheila Nelson	Dem	Sheila Nelson	Dem hold	D+49.5
131	R+25.6	Rob Clifton	Rep	Rob Clifton	Rep hold	R+16.2
132	D+37.5	Brian Prince	Dem	Brian Prince	Dem hold	uncontested
133	R+37.7	Danny Mathis	Rep	Danny Mathis	Rep hold	uncontested
134	R+37.7	Robert Dickey	Rep	Robert Dickey	Rep hold	uncontested
135	R+47.6	Beth Camp	Rep	Beth Camp	Rep hold	uncontested
136	R+35.3	David Jenkins	Rep	David Jenkins	Rep hold	uncontested
137	D+16.2	Debbie Buckner	Dem	Debbie Buckner	Dem hold	uncontested
138	R+40.6	Vance Smith	Rep	Vance Smith	Rep hold	R+35.2
139	R+20.1	Carmen Rice	Rep	Carmen Rice	Rep hold	R+11.5
140	D+45.3	Tremaine Teddy Reese†	Dem	Marquese Averett	Dem hold	D+61.6
141	D+45.9	Carolyn Hugley	Dem	Carolyn Hugley	Dem hold	D+57.6
142	D+18.3	Miriam Paris	Dem	Miriam Paris	Dem hold	D+31.0
143	D+24.5	Anissa Jones	Dem	Anissa Jones	Dem hold	uncontested
144	R+41.4	Dale Washburn	Rep	Dale Washburn	Rep hold	uncontested
145	D+6.0	Tangie Herring	Dem	Tangie Herring	Dem hold	D+14.6
146	R+19.7	Shaw Blackmon	Rep	Shaw Blackmon	Rep hold	uncontested
147	R+8.1	Bethany Ballard	Rep	Renita Duncan	Dem flip	D+4.7
148	R+35.9	Noel Williams Jr.	Rep	Noel Williams Jr.	Rep hold	R+31.7
149	D+11.7	Floyd Griffin	Dem	Floyd Griffin	Dem hold	D+20.9
150	D+5.6	Patty Marie Stinson	Dem	Patty Marie Stinson	Dem hold	D+15.9
151	R+8.0	Mike Cheokas	Rep			runoff needed
152	R+39.8	Bill Yearta	Rep	Bill Yearta	Rep hold	R+30.1
153	D+39.2	David Sampson	Dem	David Sampson	Dem hold	uncontested
154	D+2.6	Gerald Greene	Rep	Gerald Greene	Rep hold	D+0.3
155	R+34.7	Matt Hatchett	Rep	Matt Hatchett	Rep hold	R+31.1
156	R+47.0	Leesa Hagan	Rep	Leesa Hagan	Rep hold	uncontested
157	R+54.9	Bill Werkheiser	Rep	Bradley Anderson	Rep hold	R+47.4
158	R+35.5	Butch Parrish	Rep	Butch Parrish	Rep hold	uncontested
159	R+42.4	Jon G. Burns	Rep	Jon G. Burns	Rep hold	uncontested
160	R+40.1	Lehman Franklin	Rep	Lehman Franklin	Rep hold	uncontested
161	R+16.1	Bill Hitchens	Rep	David Dillie	Dem flip	D+3.7
162	D+30.3	Carl Gilliard†	Dem	Orlando Scott	Dem hold	uncontested
163	D+43.1	Anne Allen Westbrook	Dem	Anne Allen Westbrook	Dem hold	uncontested
164	R+10.9	Ron Stephens	Rep	Stephanie Burgess	Dem flip	D+5.1
165	D+52.9	Edna Jackson†	Dem	MiQuan Green	Dem hold	uncontested
166	R+31.1	Jesse Petrea	Rep	Jesse Petrea	Rep hold	R+29.0
167	R+35.5	Buddy DeLoach	Rep	Buddy DeLoach	Rep hold	R+24.0
168	D+17.5	Al Williams	Dem	Al Williams	Dem hold	D+36.8
169	R+48.6	Angie O'Steen	Rep	Angie O'Steen	Rep hold	uncontested
170	R+45.3	Jaclyn Ford	Rep	Jaclyn Ford	Rep hold	uncontested
171	R+27.1	Joe Campbell	Rep	Joe Campbell	Rep hold	uncontested
172	R+49.0	Charles Cannon	Rep	Charles Cannon	Rep hold	uncontested
173	R+21.3	Darlene Taylor	Rep	Darlene Taylor	Rep hold	R+15.8
174	R+57.8	John Corbett	Rep	John Corbett	Rep hold	R+55.1
175	R+34.2	John LaHood	Rep	John LaHood	Rep hold	R+29.9
176	R+45.8	James Burchett	Rep	James Burchett	Rep hold	R+41.1
177	D+5.4	Alvin Payton	Dem	Elsie Napier	Dem hold	uncontested
178	R+70.0	Steven Meeks	Rep	Steven Meeks	Rep hold	R+63.9
179	R+19.0	Rick Townsend	Rep	Rick Townsend	Rep hold	uncontested
180	R+35.8	Steven Sainz	Rep	Steven Sainz	Rep hold	uncontested

== List of districts ==
Source for primary election results: Source for general election results:

=== District 1 ===
3rd term incumbent Republican Mike Cameron had represented the district since 2021.

1st district Republican primary
Party	Candidate	Votes	%
Republican	Mike Cameron (incumbent)	4,747	83.5
Republican	Neal Howell	938	16.5
Total votes		5,685	100.0

1st district general election
Party	Candidate	Votes	%
Republican	Mike Cameron (incumbent)	13,262	73.1
Democratic	Steven Disbrow	4,882	26.9
Total votes		18,144	100.0

=== District 2 ===
7th term incumbent Republican Steve Tarvin had represented the district since 2014.

2nd district Republican primary
Party	Candidate	Votes	%
Republican	Steve Tarvin (incumbent)	4,980	63.0
Republican	Christian Hurd	2,930	37.0
Total votes		7,910	100.0

2nd district general election
Party	Candidate	Votes	%
Republican	Steve Tarvin (incumbent)	16,076	75.6
Democratic	Whitney Echenique	5,194	24.4
Total votes		21,270	100.0

=== District 3 ===
2nd term incumbent Republican Mitchell Horner had represented the district since 2023.

3rd district Republican primary
Party	Candidate	Votes	%
Republican	Mitchell Horner (incumbent)	5,096	70.6
Republican	Christian Hurd	2,119	29.4
Total votes		7,215	100.0

3rd district general election
Party	Candidate	Votes	%
Republican	Mitchell Horner (incumbent)	14,000	69.2
Democratic	Margaret Spear	6,223	30.8
Total votes		20,223	100.0

=== District 4 ===
5th term incumbent Republican Kasey Carpenter had represented the district since 2017.

4th district Republican primary
Party	Candidate	Votes	%
Republican	Kasey Carpenter (incumbent)	2,468	65.9
Republican	Christian Hurd	1,277	34.1
Total votes		3,745	100.0

4th district general election
Party	Candidate	Votes	%
Republican	Kasey Carpenter (incumbent)	7,224	51.8
Democratic	Quentin Postell	6,716	48.2
Total votes		13,940	100.0

=== District 5 ===
4th term incumbent Republican Matt Barton had represented the district since 2019.

5th district general election
Party	Candidate	Votes	%
Republican	Matt Barton (incumbent)	14,231	74.2
Democratic	Ramsus Jensen	4,957	25.8
Total votes		19,188	100.0

=== District 6 ===
5th term incumbent Republican Jason Ridley had represented the district since 2017.

6th district Republican primary
Party	Candidate	Votes	%
Republican	Jason Ridley (incumbent)	6,020	100.0
Total votes		6,020	100.0

6th district Democratic primary
Party	Candidate	Votes	%
Democratic	Cathy Kott	978	100.0
Total votes		978	100.0

6th district general election
Party	Candidate	Votes	%
Republican	Jason Ridley (incumbent)	14,310	77.6
Democratic	Cathy Kott	4,132	22.4
Total votes		18,442	100.0

=== District 7 ===
2nd term incumbent Republican Johnny Chastain had represented the district since 2023.

7th district Republican primary
Party	Candidate	Votes	%
Republican	Johnny Chastain (incumbent)	11,332	100.0
Total votes		11,332	100.0

7th district general election
Party	Candidate	Votes	%
Republican	Johnny Chastain (incumbent)	23,748	100.0
Total votes		23,748	100.0

=== District 8 ===
3rd term incumbent Republican Stan Gunter had represented the district since 2021.

8th district Republican primary
Party	Candidate	Votes	%
Republican	Stan Gunter (incumbent)	12,658	100.0
Total votes		12,658	100.0

8th district Democratic primary
Party	Candidate	Votes	%
Democratic	Nick Mithcell	2,122	100.0
Total votes		2,122	100.0

8th district general election
Party	Candidate	Votes	%
Republican	Stan Gunter (incumbent)	25,551	81.2
Democratic	Nick Mitchell	5,900	18.8
Total votes		31,451	100.0

=== District 9 ===
3rd term incumbent Republican Will Wade had represented the district since 2021. Wade did not seek re-election and was succeeded by fellow Republican Chris Dockery.

9th district Republican primary
Party	Candidate	Votes	%
Republican	Chris Dockery	5,789	53.3
Republican	Doug Sherrill	3,183	29.3
Republican	Wayne Rowan	1,891	17.4
Total votes		10,863	100.0

9th district Democratic primary
Party	Candidate	Votes	%
Democratic	Roger Smith	1,613	100.0
Total votes		1,613	100.0

9th district general election
Party	Candidate	Votes	%
Republican	Chris Dockery	20,476	77.9
Democratic	Roger Smith	5,802	22.1
Total votes		26,278	100.0

=== District 10 ===
3rd term incumbent Republican Victor Anderson had represented the district since 2021.

10th district Republican primary
Party	Candidate	Votes	%
Republican	Victor Anderson (incumbent)	9,482	100.0
Total votes		9,482	100.0

10th district Democratic primary
Party	Candidate	Votes	%
Democratic	John Brown	1,620	100.0
Total votes		1,620	100.0

10th district general election
Party	Candidate	Votes	%
Republican	Victor Anderson (incumbent)	18,504	77.4
Democratic	John Brown	5,403	22.6
Total votes		23,907	100.0

=== District 11 ===
9th term incumbent Republican Rick Jasperse had represented the district since 2010.

11th district Republican primary
Party	Candidate	Votes	%
Republican	Rick Jasperse (incumbent)	9,735	100.0
Total votes		9,735	100.0

11th district Democratic primary
Party	Candidate	Votes	%
Democratic	Ryan Fountain	1,866	100.0
Total votes		1,866	100.0

11th district general election
Party	Candidate	Votes	%
Republican	Rick Jasperse (incumbent)	21,676	77.2
Democratic	Ryan Fountain	6,387	22.8
Total votes		28,063	100.0

=== District 12 ===
7th term incumbent Republican Eddie Lumsden had represented the district since 2013.

12th district Republican primary
Party	Candidate	Votes	%
Republican	Eddie Lumsden (incumbent)	6,426	100.0
Total votes		6,426	100.0

12th district Democratic primary
Party	Candidate	Votes	%
Democratic	Holly Chaney	1,569	100.0
Total votes		1,569	100.0

12th district general election
Party	Candidate	Votes	%
Republican	Eddie Lumsden (incumbent)	13,729	74.1
Democratic	Holly Chaney	4,797	25.9
Total votes		18,526	100.0

=== District 13 ===
10th term incumbent Republican Katie Dempsey had represented the district since 2007.

13th district Republican primary
Party	Candidate	Votes	%
Republican	Katie Dempsey (incumbent)	4,635	72.3
Republican	Kristie Miner	1,775	27.7
Total votes		6,410	100.0

13th district Democratic primary
Party	Candidate	Votes	%
Democratic	Vincent Mendes	2,753	100.0
Total votes		2,753	100.0

13th district general election
Party	Candidate	Votes	%
Republican	Katie Dempsey (incumbent)	11,110	59.3
Democratic	Vincent Mendes	7,610	40.7
Total votes		18,720	100.0

=== District 14 ===
4th term incumbent Republican Mitchell Scoggins had represented the district since 2019.

14th district Republican primary
Party	Candidate	Votes	%
Republican	Mitchell Scoggins (incumbent)	7,767	100.0
Total votes		7,767	100.0

14th district Democratic primary
Party	Candidate	Votes	%
Democratic	Bella Bautista	1,987	100.0
Total votes		1,987	100.0

14th district general election
Party	Candidate	Votes	%
Republican	Mitchell Scoggins (incumbent)	18,935	75.7
Democratic	Bella Bautista	6,076	24.3
Total votes		25,011	100.0

=== District 15 ===
4th term incumbent Republican Matthew Gambill had represented the district since 2019.

15th district Republican primary
Party	Candidate	Votes	%
Republican	Matthew Gambill (incumbent)	6,102	100.0
Total votes		6,102	100.0

15th district Democratic primary
Party	Candidate	Votes	%
Democratic	Lauren Jones	1,669	100.0
Total votes		1,669	100.0

15th district general election
Party	Candidate	Votes	%
Republican	Matthew Gambill (incumbent)	14,720	65.7
Democratic	Lauren Jones	7,685	34.3
Total votes		22,405	100.0

=== District 16 ===
7th term incumbent Republican Trey Kelley had represented the district since 2013.

16th district Republican primary
Party	Candidate	Votes	%
Republican	Trey Kelley (incumbent)	7,338	100.0
Total votes		7,338	100.0

16th district Democratic primary
Party	Candidate	Votes	%
Democratic	Diana Spangler	2,089	100.0
Total votes		2,089	100.0

16th district general election
Party	Candidate	Votes	%
Republican	Trey Kelley (incumbent)	15,428	71.5
Democratic	Diana Spangler	6,154	28.5
Total votes		21,582	100.0

=== District 17 ===
4th term incumbent Republican Martin Momtahan had represented the district since 2019. Democrat Tamyko Green withdrew after winning the primary and was replaced by Ke'Andra Foggie.

17th district Republican primary
Party	Candidate	Votes	%
Republican	Martin Momtahan (incumbent)	5,354	100.0
Total votes		5,354	100.0

17th district Democratic primary
Party	Candidate	Votes	%
Democratic	Tamyko Green	4,234	100.0
Total votes		4,234	100.0

17th district general election
Party	Candidate	Votes	%
Republican	Martin Momtahan (incumbent)	13,457	52.4
Democratic	Ke'Andra Foggie	12,213	47.6
Total votes		25,670	100.0

=== District 18 ===
3rd term incumbent Republican Tyler Smith had represented the district since 2021.

18th district Republican primary
Party	Candidate	Votes	%
Republican	Tyler Smith (incumbent)	7,111	77.1
Republican	Frank Phillips	2,107	22.9
Total votes		9,218	100.0

18th district Democratic primary
Party	Candidate	Votes	%
Democratic	Pat Rhudy	1,603	100.0
Total votes		1,603	100.0

18th district general election
Party	Candidate	Votes	%
Republican	Tyler Smith (incumbent)	19,249	80.3
Democratic	Pat Rhudy	4,734	19.7
Total votes		23,983	100.0

=== District 19 ===
4th term incumbent Republican Joseph Gullett had represented the district since 2019.

19th district Republican primary
Party	Candidate	Votes	%
Republican	Joseph Gullett (incumbent)	6,038	100.0
Total votes		6,038	100.0

19th district Democratic primary
Party	Candidate	Votes	%
Democratic	Cynthia Starke-Jones	6,022	100.0
Total votes		6,022	100.0

19th district general election
Party	Candidate	Votes	%
Democratic	Cynthia Starke-Jones	14,893	51.9
Republican	Joseph Gullett (incumbent)	13,785	48.1
Total votes		28,678	100.0

=== District 20 ===
3rd term incumbent Republican Charlice Byrd had represented the district since 2021.

20th district Republican primary
Party	Candidate	Votes	%
Republican	Charlice Byrd (incumbent)	4,126	52.3
Republican	Mark Fernandez	3,765	47.7
Total votes		7,891	100.0

20th district Democratic primary
Party	Candidate	Votes	%
Democratic	Jason Tanner	2,563	70.5
Democratic	Erik Zeil	1,073	29.5
Total votes		3,636	100.0

20th district general election
Party	Candidate	Votes	%
Republican	Charlice Byrd (incumbent)	16,027	60.1
Democratic	Jason Tanner	10,641	39.9
Total votes		26,668	100.0

=== District 21 ===
3rd term incumbent Republican Brad Thomas had represented the district since 2021.

21th district Republican primary
Party	Candidate	Votes	%
Republican	Brad Thomas (incumbent)	9,218	100.0
Total votes		9,218	100.0

21th district Democratic primary
Party	Candidate	Votes	%
Democratic	Anthony Aragues	3,238	100.0
Total votes		3,238	100.0

21st district general election
Party	Candidate	Votes	%
Republican	Brad Thomas (incumbent)	21,104	68.0
Democratic	Anthony Aragues	9,913	32.0
Total votes		31,017	100.0

=== District 22 ===
2nd term incumbent Republican Jordan Ridley had represented the district since 2023.

22nd district Republican primary
Party	Candidate	Votes	%
Republican	Jordan Ridley (incumbent)	5,618	100.0
Total votes		5,618	100.0

22nd district Democratic primary
Party	Candidate	Votes	%
Democratic	James Shade	4,744	100.0
Total votes		4,744	100.0

22nd district general election
Party	Candidate	Votes	%
Republican	Jordan Ridley (incumbent)	13,166	50.5
Democratic	James Shade	12,896	49.5
Total votes		26,062	100.0

=== District 23 ===
1st term incumbent Republican Bill Fincher had represented the district since 2026.

23rd district Republican primary
Party	Candidate	Votes	%
Republican	Bill Fincher (incumbent)	8,063	100.0
Total votes		8,063	100.0

23rd district Democratic primary
Party	Candidate	Votes	%
Democratic	Rob Epstein	2,561	100.0
Total votes		2,561	100.0

23rd district general election
Party	Candidate	Votes	%
Republican	Bill Fincher (incumbent)	19,002	70.1
Democratic	Rob Epstein	8,108	29.9
Total votes		27,110	100.0

=== District 24 ===
2nd term incumbent Republican Carter Barrett had represented the district since 2023.

24th district Republican primary
Party	Candidate	Votes	%
Republican	Carter Barrett (incumbent)	5,773	100.0
Total votes		5,773	100.0

24th district Democratic primary
Party	Candidate	Votes	%
Democratic	Maureen Gault	2,981	100.0
Total votes		2,981	100.0

24th district general election
Party	Candidate	Votes	%
Republican	Carter Barrett (incumbent)	14,222	57.7
Democratic	Maureen Gault	10,412	42.3
Total votes		24,634	100.0

=== District 25 ===
5th term incumbent Republican Todd Jones had represented the district since 2017.

25th district Republican primary
Party	Candidate	Votes	%
Republican	Todd Jones (incumbent)	4,781	87.5
Republican	Matthew Philip	681	12.5
Total votes		5,462	100.0

25th district Democratic primary
Party	Candidate	Votes	%
Democratic	Elaine Padgett	2,684	78.8
Democratic	Metin Vargonen	723	21.2
Total votes		3,407	100.0

25th district general election
Party	Candidate	Votes	%
Republican	Todd Jones (incumbent)	12,750	51.6
Democratic	Elaine Padgett	11,966	48.4
Total votes		24,716	100.0

=== District 26 ===
3rd term incumbent Republican Lauren McDonald had represented the district since 2021.

26th district Republican primary
Party	Candidate	Votes	%
Republican	Lauren McDonald (incumbent)	6,680	100.0
Total votes		6,680	100.0

26th district Democratic primary
Party	Candidate	Votes	%
Democratic	Meredith Greene	2,679	100.0
Total votes		2,679	100.0

26th district general election
Party	Candidate	Votes	%
Republican	Lauren McDonald (incumbent)	15,368	61.7
Democratic	Meredith Greene	9,551	38.3
Total votes		24,919	100.0

=== District 27 ===
7th term incumbent Republican Lee Hawkins had represented the district since 2013.

27th district Republican primary
Party	Candidate	Votes	%
Republican	Lee Hawkins (incumbent)	10,292	100.0
Total votes		10,292	100.0

27th district Democratic primary
Party	Candidate	Votes	%
Democratic	Jay Kirkland	1,681	100.0
Total votes		1,681	100.0

27th district general election
Party	Candidate	Votes	%
Republican	Lee Hawkins (incumbent)	19,741	78.4
Democratic	Jay Kirkland	5,448	21.6
Total votes		25,189	100.0

=== District 28 ===
2nd term incumbent Republican Brent Cox had represented the district since 2023.

28th district Republican primary
Party	Candidate	Votes	%
Republican	Brent Cox (incumbent)	8,525	100.0
Total votes		8,525	100.0

28th district Democratic primary
Party	Candidate	Votes	%
Democratic	Mateo Sanabria	2,240	100.0
Total votes		2,240	100.0

28th district general election
Party	Candidate	Votes	%
Republican	Brent Cox (incumbent)	18,944	72.1
Democratic	Mateo Sanabria	7,320	27.9
Total votes		26,264	100.0

=== District 29 ===
5th term incumbent Republican Matt Dubnik had represented the district since 2017.

29th district Republican primary
Party	Candidate	Votes	%
Republican	Matt Dubnik (incumbent)	3,438	86.9
Republican	Cody Ewing	519	13.1
Total votes		3,957	100.0

29th district Democratic primary
Party	Candidate	Votes	%
Democratic	Scott Soracco	2,252	100.0
Total votes		2,252	100.0

29th district general election
Party	Candidate	Votes	%
Democratic	Scott Soracco	7,915	50.4
Republican	Matt Dubnik (incumbent)	7,780	49.6
Total votes		15,695	100.0

=== District 30 ===
2nd term incumbent Republican Derrick McCollum had represented the district since 2023.

30th district Republican primary
Party	Candidate	Votes	%
Republican	Derrick McCollum (incumbent)	8,173	100.0
Total votes		8,173	100.0

30th district Democratic primary
Party	Candidate	Votes	%
Democratic	Braden Doxey	2,837	100.0
Total votes		2,837	100.0

30th district general election
Party	Candidate	Votes	%
Republican	Derrick McCollum (incumbent)	17,635	64.7
Democratic	Braden Doxey	9,628	35.3
Total votes		27,263	100.0

=== District 31 ===
8th term incumbent Republican Emory Dunahoo had represented the district since 2011. Dunahoo did not seek re-election and was succeeded by fellow Republican Chad Bingham.

31st district Republican primary
Party	Candidate	Votes	%
Republican	Chad Bingham	7,265	100.0
Total votes		7,265	100.0

31st district general election
Party	Candidate	Votes	%
Republican	Chad Bingham (incumbent)	22,376	100.0
Total votes		22,376	100.0

=== District 32 ===
2nd term incumbent Republican Chris Erwin had represented the district since 2023.

32nd district Republican primary
Party	Candidate	Votes	%
Republican	Chris Erwin (incumbent)	7,993	100.0
Total votes		7,993	100.0

32nd district Democratic primary
Party	Candidate	Votes	%
Democratic	Rebecca Sims	1,206	100.0
Total votes		1,206	100.0

32nd district general election
Party	Candidate	Votes	%
Republican	Chris Erwin (incumbent)	16,803	79.0
Democratic	Rebecca Sims	4,473	21.0
Total votes		21,276	100.0

=== District 33 ===
18th term incumbent Republican Alan Powell had represented the district since 1991.

33rd district Republican primary
Party	Candidate	Votes	%
Republican	Alan Powell (incumbent)	8,412	100.0
Total votes		8,412	100.0

33rd district general election
Party	Candidate	Votes	%
Republican	Alan Powell (incumbent)	20,814	100.0
Total votes		20,814	100.0

=== District 34 ===
3rd term incumbent Republican Devan Seabaugh had represented the district since 2021.

34th district Republican primary
Party	Candidate	Votes	%
Republican	Devan Seabaugh (incumbent)	7,738	100.0
Total votes		7,738	100.0

34th district Democratic primary
Party	Candidate	Votes	%
Democratic	Titus Nichols	6,653	100.0
Total votes		6,653	100.0

34th district general election
Party	Candidate	Votes	%
Republican	Devan Seabaugh (incumbent)	16,395	51.3
Democratic	Titus Nichols	15,568	48.7
Total votes		31,963	100.0

=== District 35 ===
2nd term incumbent Democratic Lisa Campbell had represented the district since 2023.

35th district Democratic primary
Party	Candidate	Votes	%
Democratic	Lisa Campbell (incumbent)	5,485	100.0
Total votes		5,485	100.0

35th district Republican primary
Party	Candidate	Votes	%
Republican	Elivs Casely	2,359	100.0
Total votes		2,359	100.0

35th district general election
Party	Candidate	Votes	%
Democratic	Lisa Campbell (incumbent)	15,416	71.1
Republican	Elivs Casely	6,252	28.9
Total votes		21,668	100.0

=== District 36 ===
4th term incumbent Republican Ginny Ehrhart had represented the district since 2019.

36th district Republican primary
Party	Candidate	Votes	%
Republican	Ginny Ehrhart (incumbent)	7,168	100.0
Total votes		7,168	100.0

36th district Democratic primary
Party	Candidate	Votes	%
Democratic	Luc Noiset	5,235	100.0
Total votes		5,235	100.0

36th district general election
Party	Candidate	Votes	%
Republican	Ginny Ehrhart (incumbent)	16,353	55.2
Democratic	Luc Noiset	13,271	44.8
Total votes		29,624	100.0

=== District 37 ===
4th term incumbent Democratic Mary Frances Williams represented the district since 2019.

37th district Democratic primary
Party	Candidate	Votes	%
Democratic	Mary Frances Williams (incumbent)	4,244	74.0
Democratic	Graham Bowers	1,489	26.0
Total votes		5,733	100.0

37th district general election
Party	Candidate	Votes	%
Democratic	Mary Frances Williams (incumbent)	15,784	100.0
Total votes		15,784	100.0

=== District 38 ===
8th term incumbent Democratic David Wilkerson had represented the district since 2011.

38th district Democratic primary
Party	Candidate	Votes	%
Democratic	David Wilkerson (incumbent)	9,575	100.0
Total votes		9,575	100.0

38th district general election
Party	Candidate	Votes	%
Democratic	David Wilkerson (incumbent)	22,678	100.0
Total votes		22,678	100.0

=== District 39 ===
2nd term incumbent Democratic Terry Commings had represented the district since 2023.

39th district Democratic primary
Party	Candidate	Votes	%
Democratic	Terry Commings (incumbent)	9,424	100.0
Total votes		9,424	100.0

39th district general election
Party	Candidate	Votes	%
Democratic	Terry Commings (incumbent)	19,717	100.0
Total votes		19,717	100.0

=== District 40 ===
2nd term incumbent Republican Kimberly New had represented the district since 2023.

40th district Republican primary
Party	Candidate	Votes	%
Republican	Kimberly New (incumbent)	5,124	100.0
Total votes		5,124	100.0

40th district Democratic primary
Party	Candidate	Votes	%
Democratic	Elisa Lassiter	5,319	100.0
Total votes		5,319	100.0

40th district general election
Party	Candidate	Votes	%
Democratic	Elisa Lassiter	12,985	51.0
Republican	Kimberly New (incumbent)	12,476	49.0
Total votes		25,461	100.0

=== District 41 ===
7th term incumbent Democratic Michael Smith had represented the district since 2013.

41st district Democratic primary
Party	Candidate	Votes	%
Democratic	Michael Smith (incumbent)	6,057	100.0
Total votes		6,057	100.0

41st district general election
Party	Candidate	Votes	%
Democratic	Michael Smith (incumbent)	16,571	100.0
Total votes		16,571	100.0

=== District 42 ===
1st term incumbent Democratic Gabriel Sanchez had represented the district since 2025.

42nd district Democratic primary
Party	Candidate	Votes	%
Democratic	Gabriel Sanchez (incumbent)	6,217	82.2
Democratic	Carlos Vilela	1,346	17.8
Total votes		7,563	100.0

42nd district Republican primary
Party	Candidate	Votes	%
Republican	André Stafford	2,195	100.0
Total votes		2,195	100.0

42nd district general election
Party	Candidate	Votes	%
Democratic	Gabriel Sanchez (incumbent)	16,612	74.2
Republican	André Stafford	5,772	25.8
Total votes		22,384	100.0

=== District 43 ===
2nd term incumbent Democratic Solomon Adesanya had represented the district since 2023.

43rd district Democratic primary
Party	Candidate	Votes	%
Democratic	Solomon Adesanya (incumbent)	5,296	100.0
Total votes		5,296	100.0

43rd district general election
Party	Candidate	Votes	%
Democratic	Solomon Adesanya (incumbent)	17,282	100.0
Total votes		17,282	100.0

=== District 44 ===
16th term incumbent Republican Don Parsons had represented the district since 1995.

44th district Republican primary
Party	Candidate	Votes	%
Republican	Don Parsons (incumbent)	5,606	100.0
Total votes		5,606	100.0

44th district Democratic primary
Party	Candidate	Votes	%
Democratic	Danielle Bell	5,233	100.0
Total votes		5,233	100.0

44th district general election
Party	Candidate	Votes	%
Democratic	Danielle Bell	14,543	52.0
Republican	Don Parsons (incumbent)	13,415	48.00
Total votes		27,958	100.0

=== District 45 ===
15th term incumbent Republican Sharon Cooper had represented the district since 1997.

45th district Republican primary
Party	Candidate	Votes	%
Republican	Sharon Cooper (incumbent)	7,376	100.0
Total votes		7,376	100.0

45th district Democratic primary
Party	Candidate	Votes	%
Democratic	Michelle Schreiner	5,382	100.0
Total votes		5,382	100.0

45th district general election
Party	Candidate	Votes	%
Republican	Sharon Cooper (incumbent)	16,417	51.8
Democratic	Michelle Schreiner	15,294	48.2
Total votes		31,711	100.0

=== District 46 ===
8th term incumbent Republican John Carson had represented the district since 2011.

46th district Republican primary
Party	Candidate	Votes	%
Republican	John Carson (incumbent)	6,814	100.0
Total votes		6,814	100.0

46th district Democratic primary
Party	Candidate	Votes	%
Democratic	Dumont Walker	5,375	100.0
Total votes		5,375	100.0

46th district general election
Party	Candidate	Votes	%
Republican	John Carson (incumbent)	16,022	51.7
Democratic	Dumont Walker	14,976	48.3
Total votes		30,998	100.0

=== District 47 ===
12th term incumbent Republican Jan Jones had represented the district since 2003. Jones did not seek re-election and was succeeded by fellow Republican Jack Miller.

47th district Republican primary
Party	Candidate	Votes	%
Republican	Jack Miller	2,561	49.3
Republican	Brian Cochran	1,945	37.4
Republican	Phoebe Eckhardt	693	13.3
Total votes		5,219	100.0

47th district Democratic primary
Party	Candidate	Votes	%
Democratic	Lindsay Defranco	3,937	100.0
Total votes		3,937	100.0

47th district general election
Party	Candidate	Votes	%
Republican	Jack Miller	13,678	53.8
Democratic	Lindsay Defranco	11,723	46.2
Total votes		25,401	100.0

=== District 48 ===
2nd term incumbent Republican Scott Hilton had represented the district since 2023.

48th district Republican primary
Party	Candidate	Votes	%
Republican	Scott Hilton (incumbent)	5,760	100.0
Total votes		5,760	100.0

48th district Democratic primary
Party	Candidate	Votes	%
Democratic	Adam Cleveland	5,441	100.0
Total votes		5,441	100.0

48th district general election
Party	Candidate	Votes	%
Democratic	Adam Cleveland	14,086	50.8
Republican	Scott Hilton (incumbent)	13,636	49.2
Total votes		27,722	100.0

=== District 49 ===
12th term incumbent Republican Chuck Martin had represented the district since 2003. Democrat Teresa Lin withdrew after winning the primary and was replaced by Sara Fuchs.

49th district Republican primary
Party	Candidate	Votes	%
Republican	Chuck Martin (incumbent)	6,272	100.0
Total votes		6,272	100.0

49th district Democratic primary
Party	Candidate	Votes	%
Democratic	Teresa Lin	4,989	100.0
Total votes		4,989	100.0

49th district general election
Party	Candidate	Votes	%
Republican	Chuck Martin (incumbent)	15,876	52.2
Democratic	Sara Fuchs	14,534	47.8
Total votes		30,410	100.0

=== District 50 ===
2nd term incumbent Democratic Michelle Au had represented the district since 2023.

50th district Democratic primary
Party	Candidate	Votes	%
Democratic	Michelle Au (incumbent)	4,885	100.0
Total votes		4,885	100.0

50th district Republican primary
Party	Candidate	Votes	%
Republican	Azure Duan	3,060	100.0
Total votes		3,060	100.0

50th district general election
Party	Candidate	Votes	%
Democratic	Michelle Au (incumbent)	15,058	64.0
Republican	Azure Duan	8,472	36.0
Total votes		23,530	100.0

=== District 51 ===
2nd term incumbent Democrat Esther Panitch had represented the district since 2023.

51st district Democratic primary
Party	Candidate	Votes	%
Democratic	Esther Panitch (incumbent)	3,767	56.5
Democratic	Aaron Baker	2,901	43.5
Total votes		6,668	100.0

51st district general election
Party	Candidate	Votes	%
Democratic	Esther Panitch (incumbent)	15,513	64.4
Republican	Keith Gettmann	8,579	35.6
Total votes		24,092	100.0

=== District 52 ===
3rd term incumbent Democrat Shea Roberts had represented the district since 2021.

52nd district Democratic primary
Party	Candidate	Votes	%
Democratic	Shea Roberts (incumbent)	6,556	100.0
Total votes		6,556	100.0

52nd district general election
Party	Candidate	Votes	%
Democratic	Shea Roberts (incumbent)	20,825	100.0
Total votes		20,825	100.0

=== District 53 ===
2nd term incumbent Republican Deborah Silcox had represented the district since 2023.

53rd district Republican primary
Party	Candidate	Votes	%
Republican	Deborah Silcox (incumbent)	5,653	100.0
Total votes		5,653	100.0

53rd district Democratic primary
Party	Candidate	Votes	%
Democratic	Beth Fuller	4,939	80.0
Democratic	Tim Dorr	1,237	20.0
Total votes		6,176	100.0

53rd district general election
Party	Candidate	Votes	%
Democratic	Beth Fuller	15,121	51.2
Republican	Deborah Silcox (incumbent)	14,403	48.8
Total votes		29,524	100.0

=== District 54 ===
4th term incumbent Democrat Betsy Holland had represented the district since 2019.

54th district Democratic primary
Party	Candidate	Votes	%
Democratic	Betsy Holland (incumbent)	5,458	83.9
Democratic	Derrick Tuff II	1,049	16.1
Total votes		6,507	100.0

54th district Republican primary
Party	Candidate	Votes	%
Republican	Greg Miller	2,745	100.0
Total votes		2,745	100.0

54th district general election
Party	Candidate	Votes	%
Democratic	Betsy Holland (incumbent)	16,714	66.1
Republican	Greg Miller	8,569	33.9
Total votes		25,283	100.0

=== District 55 ===
2nd term incumbent Democrat Inga Willis had represented the district since 2023.

55th district Democratic primary
Party	Candidate	Votes	%
Democratic	Inga Willis (incumbent)	8,756	100.0
Total votes		8,756	100.0

55th district Republican primary
Party	Candidate	Votes	%
Republican	Samuel Lenaeus	1,228	100.0
Total votes		1,228	100.0

55th district general election
Party	Candidate	Votes	%
Democratic	Inga Willis (incumbent)	20,188	83.3
Republican	Samuel Lenaeus	4,050	16.7
Total votes		24,238	100.0

=== District 56 ===
1st term incumbent Democrat Bryce Berry had represented the district since 2025.

56th district Democratic primary
Party	Candidate	Votes	%
Democratic	Bryce Berry (incumbent)	6,935	100.0
Total votes		6,935	100.0

56th district general election
Party	Candidate	Votes	%
Democratic	Bryce Berry (incumbent)	18,485	100.0
Total votes		18,485	100.0
Democratic hold			

=== District 57 ===
3rd term incumbent Democrat Stacey Evans had represented the district since 2021.

57th district Democratic primary
Party	Candidate	Votes	%
Democratic	Stacey Evans (incumbent)	9,318	84.6
Democratic	Jeremiah Olney	1,700	15.4
Total votes		11,018	100.0

57th district Republican primary
Party	Candidate	Votes	%
Republican	Helmut Love	1,323	100.0
Total votes		1,323	100.0

57th district general election
Party	Candidate	Votes	%
Democratic	Stacey Evans (incumbent)	23,706	84.2
Republican	Helmut Love	4,438	15.8
Total votes		28,144	100.0
Democratic hold			

=== District 58 ===
6th term incumbent Democrat Park Cannon had represented the district since 2016. Cannon did not seek re-election and was succeeded by fellow Democrat Mathewos Samson.

58th district Democratic primary
Party	Candidate	Votes	%
Democratic	Demetria Henderson	3,967	39.0
Democratic	Matthewos Samson	2,994	29.4
Democratic	Kyle Lamont	2,262	22.2
Democratic	Edith Ladipo	957	9.4
Total votes		10,180	100.0

58th district Republican primary
Party	Candidate	Votes	%
Republican	Torrey Balam	448	100.0
Total votes		448	100.0

58th district general election
Party	Candidate	Votes	%
Democratic	Mathewos Samson	22,038	92.1
Republican	Torrey Balam	1,890	7.9
Total votes		23,928	100.0
Democratic hold			

=== District 59 ===
2nd term incumbent Democrat Phil Olaleye had represented the district since 2023.

59th district Democratic primary
Party	Candidate	Votes	%
Democratic	Phil Olaleye (incumbent)	9,520	100.0
Total votes		9,520	100.0

59th district general election
Party	Candidate	Votes	%
Democratic	Phil Olaleye (incumbent)	21,607	95.0
Republican	Devanta Sullivan	1,131	5.0
Total votes		22,738	100.0
Democratic hold			

=== District 60 ===
11th term incumbent Democrat Sheila Jones had represented the district since 2005.

60th district Democratic primary
Party	Candidate	Votes	%
Democratic	Sheila Jones (incumbent)	9,067	100.0
Total votes		9,067	100.0

60th district general election
Party	Candidate	Votes	%
Democratic	Sheila Jones (incumbent)	22,740	100.0
Total votes		22,740	100.0
Democratic hold			

=== District 61 ===
1st term incumbent Democrat Mekyah McQueen had represented the district since 2025.

61st district Democratic primary
Party	Candidate	Votes	%
Democratic	Mekyah McQueen (incumbent)	10,283	80.1
Democratic	Grace McClain	2,555	19.9
Total votes		12,833	100.0

61st district Republican primary
Party	Candidate	Votes	%
Republican	Damita Bishop	1,691	100.0
Total votes		1,691	100.0

61st district general election
Party	Candidate	Votes	%
Democratic	Mekyah McQueen (incumbent)	24,732	83.0
Republican	Damita Bishop	5,053	17.0
Total votes		29,785	100.0
Democratic hold			

=== District 62 ===
2nd term incumbent Democrat Tanya Miller had represented the district since 2023. Miller did not seek re-election in order to run in the Georgia Attorney General election. She was succeeded by fellow Democrat Kenn Collier.

62nd district Democratic primary
Party	Candidate	Votes	%
Democratic	Kenn Collier	4,305	38.3
Democratic	Kavon Arnold	3,596	32.0
Democratic	Matt Rinker	2,687	23.9
Democratic	Willie Roseberry III	653	5.8
Total votes		11,241	100.0

62nd district general election
Party	Candidate	Votes	%
Democratic	Kenn Collier	23,019	100.0
Total votes		23,019	100.0
Democratic hold			

=== District 63 ===
5th term incumbent Democrat Kim Schofield had represented the district since 2017.

63rd district Democratic primary
Party	Candidate	Votes	%
Democratic	Kim Schofield (incumbent)	8,858	100.0
Total votes		8,858	100.0

63rd district general election
Party	Candidate	Votes	%
Democratic	Kim Schofield (incumbent)	20,609	100.0
Total votes		20,609	100.0
Democratic hold			

=== District 64 ===
1st term incumbent Democrat Sylvia Wayfer Baker had represented the district since 2025.

64th district Democratic primary
Party	Candidate	Votes	%
Democratic	Sylvia Wayfer Baker (incumbent)	10,083	100.0
Total votes		10,083	100.0

64th district Republican primary
Party	Candidate	Votes	%
Republican	Lydia Parchue	2,138	100.0
Total votes		2,138	100.0

64th district general election
Party	Candidate	Votes	%
Democratic	Sylvia Wayfer Baker (incumbent)	20,953	78.6
Republican	Lydia Parchue	5,713	21.4
Total votes		26,666	100.0
Democratic hold			

=== District 65 ===
1st term incumbent Democrat Robert Dawson had represented the district since 2025.

65th district Democratic primary
Party	Candidate	Votes	%
Democratic	Robert Dawson (incumbent)	13,738	100.0
Total votes		13,738	100.0

65th district Republican primary
Party	Candidate	Votes	%
Republican	Gordon Rolle	2,479	100.0
Total votes		2,479	100.0

65th district general election
Party	Candidate	Votes	%
Democratic	Robert Dawson (incumbent)	26,379	81.3
Republican	Gordon Rolle	6,076	18.7
Total votes		32,455	100.0
Democratic hold			

=== District 66 ===
7th term incumbent Democrat Kimberly Alexander had represented the district since 2013.

66th district Democratic primary
Party	Candidate	Votes	%
Democratic	Kimberly Alexander (incumbent)	6,429	81.2
Democratic	Derrian Smith	1,485	18.8
Total votes		7,914	100.0

66th district general election
Party	Candidate	Votes	%
Democratic	Kimberly Alexander (incumbent)	18,602	100.0
Total votes		18,602	100.0
Democratic hold			

=== District 67 ===
2nd term incumbent Democrat Lydia Glaize had represented the district since 2023.

67th district Democratic primary
Party	Candidate	Votes	%
Democratic	Lydia Glaize (incumbent)	9,210	100.0
Total votes		9,210	100.0

67th district Republican primary
Party	Candidate	Votes	%
Republican	Daniel Cook	2,728	100.0
Total votes		2,728	100.0

67th district general election
Party	Candidate	Votes	%
Democratic	Lydia Glaize (incumbent)	19,396	74.5
Republican	Daniel Cook	6,645	25.5
Total votes		26,041	100.0
Democratic hold			

=== District 68 ===
2nd term incumbent Democrat Derrick Jackson had represented the district since 2023. Jackson did not seek re-election in order to run in the Georgia gubernatorial election. He was succeeded by fellow Democrat Timoria McQueen Saba.

68th district Democratic primary
Party	Candidate	Votes	%
Democratic	Mark Baker	2,818	29.8
Democratic	Timoria McQueen Saba	1,712	18.1
Democratic	Quentin Pullen	1,590	16.8
Democratic	Jonathan Bonner	1,296	13,7
Democratic	Courtney Heard	1,053	11.1
Democratic	Jane Williams	1,003	10.6
Total votes		9,472	100.0

68th district general election
Party	Candidate	Votes	%
Democratic	Timoria McQueen Saba	21,358	100.0
Total votes		21,358	100.0
Democratic hold			

=== District 69 ===
5th term incumbent Democrat Debra Bazemore had represented the district since 2017.

69th district Democratic primary
Party	Candidate	Votes	%
Democratic	Debra Bazemore (incumbent)	9,918	78.9
Democratic	Cobie Lyrix Brown	1,344	10.7
Democratic	September Cooper	1,304	10.4
Total votes		12,566	100.0

69th district general election
Party	Candidate	Votes	%
Democratic	Debra Bazemore (incumbent)	24,665	100.0
Total votes		24,665	100.0
Democratic hold			

=== District 70 ===
15th term incumbent Republican Lynn Smith had represented the district since 1997. Smith did not seek re-election and was succeeded by fellow Republican Melissa Stuckey. Democrat Diane Boulai withdrew after winning the primary and was replaced by Pierre Whatley.

70th district Republican primary
Party	Candidate	Votes	%
Republican	Melissa Stuckey	4,819	100.0
Total votes		4,819	100.0

70th district Democratic primary
Party	Candidate	Votes	%
Democratic	Diane Boulai	2,081	51.1
Democratic	Pierre Whatley	1,992	48.9
Total votes		4,073	100.0

70th district general election
Party	Candidate	Votes	%
Republican	Melissa Stuckey	11,615	53.0
Democratic	Pierre Whatley	10,315	47.0
Total votes		21,930	100.0
Republican hold			

=== District 71 ===
1st term incumbent Republican Justin Howard had represented the district since 2025. Democrat Anna Higgins withdrew after winning the primary and was replaced by Brandolynn Yarbrough.

71st district Republican primary
Party	Candidate	Votes	%
Republican	Justin Howard (incumbent)	5,170	100.0
Total votes		5,170	100.0

71st district Democratic primary
Party	Candidate	Votes	%
Democratic	Anna Higgins	2,053	56.9
Democratic	Brandolynn Yarbrough	1,555	43.1
Total votes		3,608	100.0

71st district general election
Party	Candidate	Votes	%
Republican	Justin Howard (incumbent)	13,097	57.3
Democratic	Brandolynn Yarbrough	9,748	42.7
Total votes		22,845	100.0
Republican hold			

=== District 72 ===
2nd term incumbent Republican David Huddleston had represented the district since 2023.

72nd district Republican primary
Party	Candidate	Votes	%
Republican	David Huddleston (incumbent)	6,955	100.0
Total votes		6,955	100.0

72nd district general election
Party	Candidate	Votes	%
Republican	David Huddleston (incumbent)	17,727	100.0
Total votes		17,727	100.0
Republican hold			

=== District 73 ===
5th term incumbent Republican Josh Bonner had represented the district since 2017.

73rd district Republican primary
Party	Candidate	Votes	%
Republican	Josh Bonner (incumbent)	7,988	100.0
Total votes		7,988	100.0

73rd district Democratic primary
Party	Candidate	Votes	%
Democratic	Tim Wilkinson	4,391	100.0
Total votes		4,391	100.0

73rd district general election
Party	Candidate	Votes	%
Republican	Josh Bonner (incumbent)	18,136	59.7
Democratic	Tim Wilkinson	12,260	40.3
Total votes		30,396	100.0
Republican hold			

=== District 74 ===
1st term incumbent Democrat Robert Flournoy had represented the district since 2025.

74th district Democratic primary
Party	Candidate	Votes	%
Democratic	Robert Flournoy (incumbent)	9,944	100.0
Total votes		9,944	100.0

74th district general election
Party	Candidate	Votes	%
Democratic	Robert Flournoy (incumbent)	22,751	100.0
Total votes		22,751	100.0
Democratic hold			

=== District 75 ===
2nd term incumbent Democrat Eric Bell II had represented the district since 2023.

75th district Democratic primary
Party	Candidate	Votes	%
Democratic	Eric Bell II (incumbent)	8,256	100.0
Total votes		8,256	100.0

75th district general election
Party	Candidate	Votes	%
Democratic	Eric Bell II (incumbent)	18,564	100.0
Total votes		18,564	100.0
Democratic hold			

=== District 76 ===
8th term incumbent Democrat Sandra Scott had represented the district since 2011.

76th district Democratic primary
Party	Candidate	Votes	%
Democratic	Sandra Scott (incumbent)	8,747	100.0
Total votes		8,747	100.0

76th district general election
Party	Candidate	Votes	%
Democratic	Sandra Scott (incumbent)	18,253	100.0
Total votes		18,253	100.0
Democratic hold			

=== District 77 ===
5th term incumbent Democrat Rhonda Burnough had represented the district since 2017.

77th district Democratic primary
Party	Candidate	Votes	%
Democratic	Rhonda Burnough (incumbent)	7,285	100.0
Total votes		7,285	100.0

77th district general election
Party	Candidate	Votes	%
Democratic	Rhonda Burnough (incumbent)	16,142	100.0
Total votes		16,142	100.0
Democratic hold			

=== District 78 ===
7th term incumbent Democrat Demetrius Douglas had represented the district since 2013.

78th district Democratic primary
Party	Candidate	Votes	%
Democratic	Demetrius Douglas (incumbent)	9,958	100.0
Total votes		9,958	100.0

78th district general election
Party	Candidate	Votes	%
Democratic	Demetrius Douglas (incumbent)	23,145	100.0
Total votes		23,145	100.0
Democratic hold			

=== District 79 ===
3rd term incumbent Democrat Yasmin Neal had represented the district since 2021.

79th district Democratic primary
Party	Candidate	Votes	%
Democratic	Yasmin Neal (incumbent)	5,633	100.0
Total votes		5,633	100.0

79th district Republican primary
Party	Candidate	Votes	%
Republican	David Hamrick	361	100.0
Total votes		361	100.0

79th district general election
Party	Candidate	Votes	%
Democratic	Yasmin Neal (incumbent)	13,251	91.0
Republican	David Hamrick	1,313	9.0
Total votes		14,564	100.0
Democratic hold			

=== District 80 ===
2nd term incumbent Democrat Long Tran had represented the district since 2023.

80th district Democratic primary
Party	Candidate	Votes	%
Democratic	Long Tran (incumbent)	5,854	100.0
Total votes		5,854	100.0

80th district Republican primary
Party	Candidate	Votes	%
Republican	Brian Anderson	2,975	100.0
Total votes		2,975	100.0

80th district general election
Party	Candidate	Votes	%
Democratic	Long Tran (incumbent)	15,042	66.2
Republican	Brian Anderson	7,695	33.8
Total votes		22,737	100.0
Democratic hold			

=== District 81 ===
1st term incumbent Republican Noelle Kahaian had represented the district since 2025.

81st district Republican primary
Party	Candidate	Votes	%
Republican	Noelle Kahaian (incumbent)	5,591	100.0
Total votes		5,591	100.0

81st district Democratic primary
Party	Candidate	Votes	%
Democratic	Mishael White	6,725	100.0
Total votes		6,725	100.0

81st district general election
Party	Candidate	Votes	%
Democratic	Mishael White	14,773	53.8
Republican	Noelle Kahaian (incumbent)	12,689	46.2
Total votes		27,462	100.0
Democratic gain from Republican			

=== District 82 ===
5th term incumbent Republican Karen Mathiak had represented the district since 2017.

82nd district Republican primary
Party	Candidate	Votes	%
Republican	Karen Mathiak (incumbent)	7,921	100.0
Total votes		7,921	100.0

82nd district Democratic primary
Party	Candidate	Votes	%
Democratic	Anthony Dickson	3,868	70.4
Democratic	William Harris	1,630	29.7
Total votes		5,498	100.0

82nd district general election
Party	Candidate	Votes	%
Republican	Karen Mathiak (incumbent)	15,294	56.0
Democratic	Anthony Dickson	12,023	44.0
Total votes		27,317	100.0
Republican hold			

=== District 83 ===
2nd term incumbent Democrat Karen Lupton had represented the district since 2023.

83rd district Democratic primary
Party	Candidate	Votes	%
Democratic	Karen Lupton (incumbent)	5,729	100.0
Total votes		5,729	100.0

83rd district Republican primary
Party	Candidate	Votes	%
Republican	James Smith	1,576	100.0
Total votes		1,576	100.0

83rd district general election
Party	Candidate	Votes	%
Democratic	Karen Lupton (incumbent)	14,200	71.8
Republican	James Smith	5,575	28.2
Total votes		19,775	100.0
Democratic hold			

=== District 84 ===
12th term incumbent Democrat Mary Margaret Oliver had represented the district since 2003.

84th district Democratic primary
Party	Candidate	Votes	%
Democratic	Mary Margaret Oliver (incumbent)	13,602	100.0
Total votes		13,602	100.0

84th district general election
Party	Candidate	Votes	%
Democratic	Mary Margaret Oliver (incumbent)	26,622	100.0
Total votes		26,622	100.0
Democratic hold			

=== District 85 ===
13th term incumbent Democrat Karla Drenner had represented the district since 2001.

85th district Democratic primary
Party	Candidate	Votes	%
Democratic	Karla Drenner (incumbent)	9,619	100.0
Total votes		9,619	100.0

85th district Republican primary
Party	Candidate	Votes	%
Republican	Tyion Fields	633	100.0
Total votes		633	100.0

85th district general election
Party	Candidate	Votes	%
Democratic	Karla Drenner (incumbent)	20,216	90.4
Republican	Tyion Fields	2,139	9.6
Total votes		22,355	100.0
Democratic hold			

=== District 86 ===
2nd term incumbent Democrat Imani Barnes had represented the district since 2023.

86th district Democratic primary
Party	Candidate	Votes	%
Democratic	Imani Barnes (incumbent)	8,801	100.0
Total votes		8,801	100.0

86th district general election
Party	Candidate	Votes	%
Democratic	Imani Barnes (incumbent)	20,155	100.0
Total votes		20,155	100.0
Democratic hold			

=== District 87 ===
4th term incumbent Democrat Viola Davis had represented the district since 2019.

87th district Democratic primary
Party	Candidate	Votes	%
Democratic	Viola Davis (incumbent)	9,012	100.0
Total votes		9,012	100.0

87th district Republican primary
Party	Candidate	Votes	%
Republican	Timothy Burson	1,569	100.0
Total votes		1,569	100.0

87th district general election
Party	Candidate	Votes	%
Democratic	Viola Davis (incumbent)	19,322	83.2
Republican	Timothy Burson	3,910	16.8
Total votes		23,232	100.0
Democratic hold			

=== District 88 ===
12th term incumbent Democrat Billy Mitchell had represented the district since 2003.

88th district Democratic primary
Party	Candidate	Votes	%
Democratic	Billy Mitchell (incumbent)	9,073	100.0
Total votes		9,073	100.0

88th district Republican primary
Party	Candidate	Votes	%
Republican	William Freeman	1,161	100.0
Total votes		1,161	100.0

88th district general election
Party	Candidate	Votes	%
Democratic	Billy Mitchell (incumbent)	19,488	86.4
Republican	William Freeman	3,080	13.6
Total votes		22,568	100.0
Democratic hold			

=== District 89 ===
2nd term incumbent Democrat Omari Crawford had represented the district since 2023.

89th district Democratic primary
Party	Candidate	Votes	%
Democratic	Omari Crawford (incumbent)	13,268	100.0
Total votes		13,268	100.0

89th district general election
Party	Candidate	Votes	%
Democratic	Omari Crawford (incumbent)	27,601	100.0
Total votes		27,601	100.0
Democratic hold			

=== District 90 ===
2nd term incumbent Democrat Saira Draper had represented the district since 2023. Draper did not seek re-election in order to run for State Senate district 44. She was succeeded by fellow Democrat Bentley Hudgins.

90th district Democratic primary
Party	Candidate	Votes	%
Democratic	Bentley Hudgins	7,046	66.0
Democratic	Leisa Stafford	3,627	34.0
Total votes		10,673	100.0

90th district Republican primary
Party	Candidate	Votes	%
Republican	Samantha Boston	555	100.0
Total votes		555	100.0

90th district general election
Party	Candidate	Votes	%
Democratic	Bentley Hudgins	27,942	92.5
Republican	Samantha Boston	2,280	7.5
Total votes		30,222	100.0
Democratic hold			

=== District 91 ===
3rd term incumbent Democrat Angela Moore had represented the district since 2021.

91st district Democratic primary
Party	Candidate	Votes	%
Democratic	Angela Moore (incumbent)	8,668	73.2
Democratic	Stacey Garel	3,169	26.8
Total votes		11,837	100.0

91st district general election
Party	Candidate	Votes	%
Democratic	Angela Moore (incumbent)	22,765	100.0
Total votes		22,765	100.0
Democratic hold			

=== District 92 ===
3rd term incumbent Democrat Rhonda Taylor had represented the district since 2021.

92nd district Democratic primary
Party	Candidate	Votes	%
Democratic	Rhonda Taylor (incumbent)	7,328	63.7
Democratic	Shawn Brown	2,353	20.5
Democratic	Arthur Kinney	1,826	15.9
Total votes		11,507	100.0

92nd district general election
Party	Candidate	Votes	%
Democratic	Rhonda Taylor (incumbent)	22,549	100.0
Total votes		22,549	100.0
Democratic hold			

=== District 93 ===
6th term incumbent Democrat Doreen Carter had represented the district since 2015.

93rd district Democratic primary
Party	Candidate	Votes	%
Democratic	Doreen Carter (incumbent)	8,497	100.0
Total votes		8,497	100.0

93rd district general election
Party	Candidate	Votes	%
Democratic	Doreen Carter (incumbent)	20,584	100.0
Total votes		20,584	100.0
Democratic hold			

=== District 94 ===
1st term incumbent Democrat Venola Mason had represented the district since 2026.

94th district Democratic primary
Party	Candidate	Votes	%
Democratic	Venola Mason (incumbent)	5,123	48.4
Democratic	Kelly Kautz	2,087	19.7
Democratic	Ikenna Ugwumadu	1,998	18.9
Democratic	Elmore Alexander	1,388	13.1
Total votes		10,596	100.0

94th district general election
Party	Candidate	Votes	%
Democratic	Venola Mason (incumbent)	23,274	100.0
Total votes		23,274	100.0
Democratic hold			

=== District 95 ===
8th term incumbent Democrat Dar'shun Kendrick had represented the district since 2011.

95th district Democratic primary
Party	Candidate	Votes	%
Democratic	Dar'shun Kendrick (incumbent)	5,563	55.6
Democratic	Stacy Johnson	3,054	30.54
Democratic	Zae Brewer	1,382	13.8
Total votes		9,999	100.0

95th district Republican primary
Party	Candidate	Votes	%
Republican	Reggie Hall	1,156	100.0
Total votes		1,156	100.0

95th district general election
Party	Candidate	Votes	%
Democratic	Dar'shun Kendrick (incumbent)	20,748	87.1
Republican	Reggie Hall	3,079	12.9
Total votes		23,827	100.0
Democratic hold			

=== District 96 ===
1st term incumbent Democrat Arlene Beckles had represented the district since 2025.

96th district Democratic primary
Party	Candidate	Votes	%
Democratic	Arlene Beckles (incumbent)	2,566	68.6
Democratic	Tanjina Islam	1,175	31.4
Total votes		3,741	100.0

96th district general election
Party	Candidate	Votes	%
Democratic	Arlene Beckles (incumbent)	12,167	100.0
Total votes		12,167	100.0
Democratic hold			

=== District 97 ===
2nd term incumbent Democrat Ruwa Romman had represented the district since 2023. Romman did not seek re-election in order to run for State Senate district 7. She was succeeded by fellow Democrat Jyot Singh.

97th district Democratic primary
Party	Candidate	Votes	%
Democratic	Jyot Singh	3,401	59.1
Democratic	Jacques Laurent	2,351	40.9
Total votes		5,752	100.0

97th district Republican primary
Party	Candidate	Votes	%
Republican	Yassin Moghazy	2,194	100.0
Total votes		2,194	100.0

97th district general election
Party	Candidate	Votes	%
Democratic	Jyot Singh	13,828	68.0
Republican	Yassin Moghazy	6,512	32.0
Total votes		20,340	100.0
Democratic hold			

=== District 98 ===
3rd term incumbent Democrat Marvin Lim had represented the district since 2021.

98th district Democratic primary
Party	Candidate	Votes	%
Democratic	Marvin Lim (incumbent)	1,739	61.4
Democratic	Brenda Lopez Romero	1,094	38.6
Total votes		2,833	100.0

98th district general election
Party	Candidate	Votes	%
Democratic	Marvin Lim (incumbent)	8,176	100.0
Total votes		8,176	100.0
Democratic hold			

=== District 99 ===
2nd term incumbent Republican Matt Reeves had represented the district since 2023.

99th district Republican primary
Party	Candidate	Votes	%
Republican	Matt Reeves (incumbent)	3,611	100.0
Total votes		3,611	100.0

99th district Democratic primary
Party	Candidate	Votes	%
Democratic	Michelle Kang	3,814	71.5
Democratic	Shelly Abraham	1,522	28.5
Total votes		5,336	100.0

99th district general election
Party	Candidate	Votes	%
Democratic	Michelle Kang	13,703	58.5
Republican	Matt Reeves (incumbent)	9,739	41.5
Total votes		23,442	100.0
Democratic gain from Republican			

=== District 100 ===
6th term incumbent Republican David Clark had represented the district since 2015. Clark did not seek re-election in order to run in the Georgia lieutenant gubernatorial election. He was succeeded by fellow Republican Josh Clark.

100th district Republican primary
Party	Candidate	Votes	%
Republican	Josh Clark	4,585	78.5
Republican	Edwin Duncan	1,256	21.5
Total votes		5,841	100.0

100th district Democratic primary
Party	Candidate	Votes	%
Democratic	Jennifer Ambler	3,676	100.0
Total votes		3,676	100.0

100th district general election
Party	Candidate	Votes	%
Republican	Josh Clark	12,990	52.5
Democratic	Jennifer Ambler	11,774	47.5
Total votes		24,764	100.0
Republican hold			

=== District 101 ===
8th term incumbent Democrat Scott Holcomb had represented the district since 2011.

101st district Republican primary
Party	Candidate	Votes	%
Republican	Jennifer Hutchison	1,811	100.00
Total votes		1,811	100.0

101st district Democratic primary
Party	Candidate	Votes	%
Democratic	Scott Holcomb (incumbent)	7,766	100.0
Total votes		7,766	100.0

101st district general election
Party	Candidate	Votes	%
Democratic	Scott Holcomb (incumbent)	18,022	78.6
Republican	Jennifer Hutchison	4,920	21.4
Total votes		22,942	100.0
Democratic hold			

=== District 102 ===
2nd term incumbent Democrat Gabe Okoye had represented the district since 2023.

102nd district Democratic primary
Party	Candidate	Votes	%
Democratic	Gabe Okoye (incumbent)	5,416	100.0
Total votes		5,416	100.0

102nd district general election
Party	Candidate	Votes	%
Democratic	Gabe Okoye (incumbent)	16,649	100.0
Total votes		16,649	100.0
Democratic hold			

=== District 103 ===
2nd term incumbent Republican Soo Hong had represented the district since 2023.

103rd district Republican primary
Party	Candidate	Votes	%
Republican	Soo Hong (incumbent)	4,620	100.00
Total votes		4,620	100.0

103rd district Democratic primary
Party	Candidate	Votes	%
Democratic	Chris Luchey	4,195	100.0
Total votes		4,195	100.0

103rd district general election
Party	Candidate	Votes	%
Democratic	Chris Luchey	12,016	50.1
Republican	Soo Hong (incumbent)	11,981	49.9
Total votes		23,997	100.0
Democratic gain from Republican			

=== District 104 ===
7th term incumbent Republican Chuck Efstration had represented the district since 2013.

104th district Republican primary
Party	Candidate	Votes	%
Republican	Chuck Efstration (incumbent)	4,792	100.00
Total votes		4,792	100.0

104th district general election
Party	Candidate	Votes	%
Republican	Chuck Efstration	17,893	100.0
Total votes		17,893	100.0
Republican hold			

=== District 105 ===
1st term incumbent Republican Sandy Donatucci had represented the district since 2025.

105th district Republican primary
Party	Candidate	Votes	%
Republican	Sandy Donatucci (incumbent)	3,545	100.00
Total votes		3,545	100.0

105th district Democratic primary
Party	Candidate	Votes	%
Democratic	Farooq Mughal	5,420	100.0
Total votes		5,420	100.0

105th district general election
Party	Candidate	Votes	%
Democratic	Farooq Mughal	15,250	60.7
Republican	Sandy Donatucci (incumbent)	9,854	39.3
Total votes		25,104	100.0
Democratic gain from Republican			

=== District 106 ===
1st term incumbent Democrat Akbar Ali had represented the district since 2025.

106th district Democratic primary
Party	Candidate	Votes	%
Democratic	Akbar Ali (incumbent)	5,371	100.0
Total votes		5,371	100.0

106th district general election
Party	Candidate	Votes	%
Democratic	Akbar Ali (incumbent)	16,635	100.0
Total votes		16,635	100.0
Democratic hold			

=== District 107 ===
5th term incumbent Democrat Sam Park had represented the district since 2017.

107th district Republican primary
Party	Candidate	Votes	%
Republican	Murray Berkowitz	2,329	100.00
Total votes		2,329	100.0

107th district Democratic primary
Party	Candidate	Votes	%
Democratic	Sam Park (incumbent)	5,522	100.0
Total votes		5,522	100.0

107th district general election
Party	Candidate	Votes	%
Democratic	Sam Park (incumbent)	14,794	70.9
Republican	Murray Berkowitz	6,059	29.1
Total votes		20,853	100.0
Democratic hold			

=== District 108 ===
4th term incumbent Democrat Jasmine Clark had represented the district since 2019. Clark did not seek re-election in order to run for congressional district 13. She was succeeded by fellow Democrat Rahim Asani.

108th district Republican primary
Party	Candidate	Votes	%
Republican	Elvia Davila	3,736	100.0
Total votes		3,736	100.0

108th district Democratic primary
Party	Candidate	Votes	%
Democratic	Rahim Asani	3,611	53.0
Democratic	Joshua Pressley	3,202	47.0
Total votes		6,813	100.0

108th district general election
Party	Candidate	Votes	%
Democratic	Rahim Asani	15,147	62.8
Republican	Elvia Davila	8,989	37.2
Total votes		24,136	100.0
Democratic hold			

=== District 109 ===
7th term incumbent Democrat Dewey McClain had represented the district since 2013. McClain did not seek re-election and was succeeded by fellow Democrat Juan Estrada.

109th district Democratic primary
Party	Candidate	Votes	%
Democratic	Juan Estrada	1,982	67.1
Democratic	Nico Parra	974	33.0
Total votes		2,956	100.0

109th district general election
Party	Candidate	Votes	%
Democratic	Juan Estrada	10,666	100.0
Total votes		10,666	100.0
Democratic hold			

=== District 110 ===
2nd term incumbent Democrat Segun Adeyina had represented the district since 2023.

110th district Republican primary
Party	Candidate	Votes	%
Republican	Charles Lollar	2,582	100.0
Total votes		2,582	100.0

110th district Democratic primary
Party	Candidate	Votes	%
Democratic	Segun Adeyina (incumbent)	8,828	100.0
Total votes		8,828	100.0

110th district general election
Party	Candidate	Votes	%
Democratic	Segun Adeyina (incumbent)	21,703	75.6
Republican	Charles Lollar	6,993	24.4
Total votes		28,696	100.0
Democratic hold			

=== District 111 ===
2nd term incumbent Republican Reynaldo Martinez had represented the district since 2023.

111th district Republican primary
Party	Candidate	Votes	%
Republican	Reynaldo Martinez (incumbent)	5,868	100.0
Total votes		5,868	100.0

111th district Democratic primary
Party	Candidate	Votes	%
Democratic	Scott Jackson	4,747	100.0
Total votes		4,747	100.0

111th district general election
Party	Candidate	Votes	%
Republican	Reynaldo Martinez (incumbent)	14,175	51.0
Democratic	Scott Jackson	13,642	49.0
Total votes		27,817	100.0
Republican hold			

=== District 112 ===
8th term incumbent Republican Bruce Williamson had represented the district since 2023.

112th district Republican primary
Party	Candidate	Votes	%
Republican	Bruce Williamson (incumbent)	7,767	100.0
Total votes		7,767	100.0

112th district Democratic primary
Party	Candidate	Votes	%
Democratic	Lisa Maria	3,630	100.0
Total votes		3,630	100.0

112th district general election
Party	Candidate	Votes	%
Republican	Bruce Williamson (incumbent)	16,883	63.8
Democratic	Lisa Maria	9,559	36.2
Total votes		26,442	100.0
Republican hold			

=== District 113 ===
3rd term incumbent Democrat Sharon Henderson had represented the district since 2021. Henderson did not seek re-election in order to run for State Senate district 43. She was succeeded by fellow Democrat Karla Hooper.

113th district Republican primary
Party	Candidate	Votes	%
Republican	Don Scarbrough	1,879	100.0
Total votes		1,879	100.0

113th district Democratic primary
Party	Candidate	Votes	%
Democratic	Karla Hooper	5,109	54.1
Democratic	Alana Sanders	4,341	45.9
Total votes		9,450	100.0

113th district general election
Party	Candidate	Votes	%
Democratic	Karla Hooper	19,455	80.5
Republican	Don Scarbrough	4,719	19.5
Total votes		24,174	100.0
Democratic hold			

=== District 114 ===
2nd term incumbent Republican Tim Fleming had represented the district since 2023. Fleming did not seek re-election in order to run in the Georgia Secretary of State election. He was succeeded by fellow Republican Brett Mauldin.

114th district Republican primary
Party	Candidate	Votes	%
Republican	Brett Mauldin	8,019	80.1
Republican	Wendell McNeal	1,994	19.9
Total votes		10,013	100.0

114th district Democratic primary
Party	Candidate	Votes	%
Democratic	Michael Caw	4,185	100.0
Total votes		4,185	100.0

114th district general election
Party	Candidate	Votes	%
Republican	Brett Mauldin	18,695	64.7
Democratic	Michael Caw	10,201	35.3
Total votes		28,896	100.0
Republican hold			

=== District 115 ===
3rd term incumbent Democrat Regina Lewis-Ward had represented the district since 2023.

115th district Republican primary
Party	Candidate	Votes	%
Republican	Darius Francis	1,511	100.0
Total votes		1,511	100.0

115th district Democratic primary
Party	Candidate	Votes	%
Democratic	Regina Lewis-Ward (incumbent)	15,289	100.0
Total votes		15,289	100.0

115th district general election
Party	Candidate	Votes	%
Democratic	Regina Lewis-Ward (incumbent)	27,109	88.2
Republican	Darius Francis	3,629	11.8
Total votes		30,738	100.0
Democratic hold			

=== District 116 ===
4th term incumbent Democrat El-Mahdi Holly had represented the district since 2023.

116th district Republican primary
Party	Candidate	Votes	%
Republican	Samie Conyers	1,218	100.0
Total votes		1,218	100.0

116th district Democratic primary
Party	Candidate	Votes	%
Democratic	El-Mahdi Holly (incumbent)	11,697	100.0
Total votes		11,697	100.0

116th district general election
Party	Candidate	Votes	%
Democratic	El-Mahdi Holly (incumbent)	22,692	87.5
Republican	Samie Conyers	3,255	12.5
Total votes		25,947	100.0
Democratic hold			

=== District 117 ===
1st term incumbent Democrat Mary Ann Santos had represented the district since 2025.

117th district Democratic primary
Party	Candidate	Votes	%
Democratic	Kim Thomas Smith	2,814	29.9
Democratic	Mary Ann Santos (incumbent)	2,490	26.5
Democratic	Tiffany Walker	1,650	17.6
Democratic	Vincent Williams	1,417	15.1
Democratic	Tony Brown	1,029	11.0
Total votes		9,400	100.0

117th district Democratic primary runoff
Party	Candidate	Votes	%
Democratic	Kim Thomas Smith	3,832	87.8
Democratic	Mary Ann Santos (incumbent)	531	12.2
Total votes		4,363	100.0

117th district general election
Party	Candidate	Votes	%
Democratic	Kim Thomas Smith	22,822	100.0
Total votes		22,822	100.0
Democratic hold			

=== District 118 ===
3rd term incumbent Republican Clint Crowe had represented the district since 2023.

118th district Republican primary
Party	Candidate	Votes	%
Republican	Clint Crowe (incumbent)	7,773	100.0
Total votes		7,773	100.0

118th district Democratic primary
Party	Candidate	Votes	%
Democratic	Sharonda Bell	3,631	76.1
Democratic	Jodi Lewis	1,140	23.9
Total votes		4,771	100.0

118th district general election
Party	Candidate	Votes	%
Republican	Clint Crowe (incumbent)	14,676	58.9
Democratic	Sharonda Bell	10,229	41.1
Total votes		24,905	100.0
Republican hold			

=== District 119 ===
2nd term incumbent Republican Holt Persinger had represented the district since 2023.

119th district Republican primary
Party	Candidate	Votes	%
Republican	Holt Persinger (incumbent)	6,292	100.0
Total votes		6,292	100.0

119th district Democratic primary
Party	Candidate	Votes	%
Democratic	Catherine Morris	2,569	100.0
Total votes		2,569	100.0

119th district general election
Party	Candidate	Votes	%
Republican	Holt Persinger (incumbent)	14,890	62.7
Democratic	Catherine Morris	8,861	37.3
Total votes		23,751	100.0
Republican hold			

=== District 120 ===
4th term incumbent Republican Houston Gaines had represented the district since 2023. Gaines did not seek re-election in order to run for congressional district 10. He was succeeded by fellow Republican Gary Black.

120th district Republican primary
Party	Candidate	Votes	%
Republican	Gary Black	4,007	58.4
Republican	Chad Paton	2,856	41.6
Total votes		6,863	100.0

120th district Democratic primary
Party	Candidate	Votes	%
Democratic	Suzanna Karatassos	5,304	100.0
Total votes		5,304	100.0

120th district general election
Party	Candidate	Votes	%
Republican	Gary Black	13,067	51.9
Democratic	Suzanna Karatassos	12,111	48.1
Total votes		25,178	100.0
Republican hold			

=== District 121 ===
1st term incumbent Democrat Eric Gisler had represented the district since 2026.

121st district Republican primary
Party	Candidate	Votes	%
Republican	Mack Guest IV	7,554	100.0
Total votes		7,554	100.0

121st district Democratic primary
Party	Candidate	Votes	%
Democratic	Eric Gisler (incumbent)	5,908	100.0
Total votes		5,908	100.0

121st district general election
Party	Candidate	Votes	%
Republican	Mack Guest IV	14,125	52.5
Democratic	Eric Gisler (incumbent)	12,805	47.5
Total votes		26,930	100.0
Republican gain from Democratic			

=== District 122 ===
7th term incumbent Democrat Spencer Frye had represented the district since 2023.

122nd district Republican primary
Party	Candidate	Votes	%
Republican	Carol Hubbard	1,112	100.0
Total votes		1,112	100.0

122nd district Democratic primary
Party	Candidate	Votes	%
Democratic	Spencer Frye (incumbent)	6,433	100.0
Total votes		6,433	100.0

122nd district general election
Party	Candidate	Votes	%
Democratic	Spencer Frye (incumbent)	13,571	84.3
Republican	Carol Hubbard	2,523	15.7
Total votes		16,094	100.0
Democratic hold			

=== District 123 ===
123rd district Republican primary
Party	Candidate	Votes	%
Republican	Rob Leverett (incumbent)	7,536	100.0
Total votes		7,536	100.0

123rd district Democratic primary
Party	Candidate	Votes	%
Democratic	Hope Beard	3,205	100.0
Total votes		3,205	100.0

=== District 124 ===
124th district Republican primary
Party	Candidate	Votes	%
Republican	Trey Rhodes (incumbent)	9,202	100.0
Total votes		9,202	100.0

124th district Democratic primary
Party	Candidate	Votes	%
Democratic	Melanie Miller	5,139	100.0
Total votes		5,139	100.0

=== District 125 ===
125th district Republican primary
Party	Candidate	Votes	%
Republican	Gary Richardson (incumbent)	6,624	100.0
Total votes		6,624	100.0

125th district Democratic primary
Party	Candidate	Votes	%
Democratic	Leonard Hennessy	4,282	100.0
Total votes		4,282	100.0

=== District 126 ===
126th district Republican primary
Party	Candidate	Votes	%
Republican	William Harris	3,027	100.0
Total votes		3,027	100.0

126th district Democratic primary
Party	Candidate	Votes	%
Democratic	L.C. Myles (incumbent)	7,919	100.0
Total votes		7,919	100.0

=== District 127 ===
127th district Republican primary
Party	Candidate	Votes	%
Republican	Mark Newton (incumbent)	7,030	100.0
Total votes		7,030	100.0

127th district Democratic primary
Party	Candidate	Votes	%
Democratic	Channing Taylor	3,897	100.0
Total votes		3,897	100.0

=== District 128 ===
128th district Republican primary
Party	Candidate	Votes	%
Republican	Trey Sheppard	4,807	100.0
Total votes		4,807	100.0

128th district Democratic primary
Party	Candidate	Votes	%
Democratic	Tyrone Evans	3,779	60.5
Democratic	Rameriz Lewis	2,472	39.5
Total votes		6,251	100.0

=== District 129 ===
129th district Democratic primary
Party	Candidate	Votes	%
Democratic	Karlton Howard (incumbent)	4,478	78.8
Democratic	Scott Cambers	1,202	21.2
Total votes		5,680	100.0

=== District 130 ===
130th district Republican primary
Party	Candidate	Votes	%
Republican	David Carson	1,208	56.1
Republican	Thomas McAdams	944	43.9
Total votes		2,152	100.0

130th district Democratic primary
Party	Candidate	Votes	%
Democratic	Sheila Nelson (incumbent)	3,603	50.3
Democratic	Sha'Qunta Calles	1,839	25.7
Democratic	Karen Gordon	1,323	18.5
Democratic	LaFawn Pinkney-Mealing	395	5.5
Total votes		7,160	100.0

=== District 131 ===
131st district Republican primary
Party	Candidate	Votes	%
Republican	Rob Clifton (incumbent)	6,754	100.0
Total votes		6,754	100.0

131st district Democratic primary
Party	Candidate	Votes	%
Democratic	Jenny Eppard	4,043	100.0
Total votes		4,043	100.0

=== District 132 ===
132nd district Democratic primary
Party	Candidate	Votes	%
Democratic	Brian Prince (incumbent)	7,384	100.0
Total votes		7,384	100.0

=== District 133 ===
133rd district Republican primary
Party	Candidate	Votes	%
Republican	Danny Mathis (incumbent)	4,723	60.5
Republican	Robert Pruitt	3,078	39.5
Total votes		7,801	100.0

=== District 134 ===
134th district Republican primary
Party	Candidate	Votes	%
Republican	Robert Dickey (incumbent)	6,974	100.0
Total votes		6,974	100.0

=== District 135 ===
135th district Republican primary
Party	Candidate	Votes	%
Republican	Beth Camp (incumbent)	8,612	100.0
Total votes		8,612	100.0

=== District 136 ===
136th district Republican primary
Party	Candidate	Votes	%
Republican	David Jenkins (incumbent)	6,676	100.0
Total votes		6,676	100.0

=== District 137 ===
137th district Democratic primary
Party	Candidate	Votes	%
Democratic	Debbie Buckner (incumbent)	7,395	100.0
Total votes		7,395	100.0

=== District 138 ===
138th district Republican primary
Party	Candidate	Votes	%
Republican	Vance Smith (incumbent)	8,152	100.0
Total votes		8,152	100.0

138th district Democratic primary
Party	Candidate	Votes	%
Democratic	Cyndie Hutchings	3,394	100.0
Total votes		3,394	100.0

=== District 139 ===
139th district Republican primary
Party	Candidate	Votes	%
Republican	Carmen Rice (incumbent)	5,868	100.0
Total votes		5,868	100.0

139th district Democratic primary
Party	Candidate	Votes	%
Democratic	Elliot Valdez	4,591	100.0
Total votes		4,591	100.0

=== District 140 ===
140th district Republican primary
Party	Candidate	Votes	%
Republican	Edward Kvietkus	917	100.0
Total votes		917	100.0

140th district Democratic primary
Party	Candidate	Votes	%
Democratic	Marquese Averett	4,205	100.0
Total votes		4,205	100.0

=== District 141 ===
141st district Republican primary
Party	Candidate	Votes	%
Republican	Reggie Liparoto	1,570	100.0
Total votes		1,570	100.0

141st district Democratic primary
Party	Candidate	Votes	%
Democratic	Carolyn Hugley (incumbent)	7,660	100.0
Total votes		7,660	100.0

=== District 142 ===
142nd district Republican primary
Party	Candidate	Votes	%
Republican	Calvin Palmer	3,512	100.0
Total votes		3,512	100.0

142nd district Democratic primary
Party	Candidate	Votes	%
Democratic	Miriam Paris (incumbent)	5,073	74.6
Democratic	George Thomas	1,728	25.4
Total votes		6,801	100.0

=== District 143 ===
143rd district Democratic primary
Party	Candidate	Votes	%
Democratic	Anissa Jones (incumbent)	5,349	100.0
Total votes		5,349	100.0

=== District 144 ===
144th district Republican primary
Party	Candidate	Votes	%
Republican	Dale Washburn (incumbent)	9,223	100.0
Total votes		9,223	100.0

=== District 145 ===
145th district Republican primary
Party	Candidate	Votes	%
Republican	Eric Wilson	4,709	100.0
Total votes		4,709	100.0

145th district Democratic primary
Party	Candidate	Votes	%
Democratic	Tangie Herring (incumbent)	5,977	100.0
Total votes		5,977	100.0

=== District 146 ===
146th district Republican primary
Party	Candidate	Votes	%
Republican	Shaw Blackmon (incumbent)	6,057	100.0
Total votes		6,057	100.0

=== District 147 ===
147th district Republican primary
Party	Candidate	Votes	%
Republican	Bethany Ballard (incumbent)	4,466	100.0
Total votes		4,466	100.0

147th district Democratic primary
Party	Candidate	Votes	%
Democratic	Renita Duncan	4,228	81.1
Democratic	Tim Riley	984	18.9
Total votes		5,212	100.0

=== District 148 ===
148th district Republican primary
Party	Candidate	Votes	%
Republican	Noel Williams Jr. (incumbent)	6,486	100.0
Total votes		6,486	100.0

148th district Democratic primary
Party	Candidate	Votes	%
Democratic	Cynthia Johnson	2,166	71.4
Democratic	Lillie Bryant	867	28.6
Total votes		3,033	100.0

=== District 149 ===
149th district Republican primary
Party	Candidate	Votes	%
Republican	Randy Peters	3,166	100.0
Total votes		3,166	100.0

149th district Democratic primary
Party	Candidate	Votes	%
Democratic	Floyd Griffin (incumbent)	4,877	80.0
Democratic	Ross Sheppard	1,220	20.0
Total votes		6,097	100.0

=== District 150 ===
150th district Republican primary
Party	Candidate	Votes	%
Republican	Cary Moore	3,433	100.0
Total votes		3,433	100.0

150th district Democratic primary
Party	Candidate	Votes	%
Democratic	Patty Marie Stinson (incumbent)	4,723	100.0
Total votes		4,723	100.0

=== District 151 ===
151st district Republican primary
Party	Candidate	Votes	%
Republican	Mike Cheokas (incumbent)	4,408	100.0
Total votes		4,408	100.0

151st district Democratic primary
Party	Candidate	Votes	%
Democratic	Ethan Wolfe	4,535	100.0
Total votes		4,535	100.0

=== District 152 ===
152nd district Republican primary
Party	Candidate	Votes	%
Republican	Bill Yearta (incumbent)	6,566	100.0
Total votes		6,566	100.0

152nd district Democratic primary
Party	Candidate	Votes	%
Democratic	Mitchell Rosa	3,568	100.0
Total votes		3,568	100.0

=== District 153 ===
153rd district Democratic primary
Party	Candidate	Votes	%
Democratic	David Sampson (incumbent)	6,041	100.0
Total votes		6,041	100.0

=== District 154 ===
154th district Republican primary
Party	Candidate	Votes	%
Republican	Gerald Greene (incumbent)	3,956	100.0
Total votes		3,956	100.0

154th district Democratic primary
Party	Candidate	Votes	%
Democratic	Harry James	5,179	100.0
Total votes		5,179	100.0

=== District 155 ===
155th district Republican primary
Party	Candidate	Votes	%
Republican	Matt Hatchett (incumbent)	6,058	90.8
Republican	KC Cook	613	9.2
Total votes		6,671	100.0

155th district Democratic primary
Party	Candidate	Votes	%
Democratic	Joe Powers	3,224	100.0
Total votes		3,224	100.0

=== District 156 ===
156th district Republican primary
Party	Candidate	Votes	%
Republican	Leesa Hagan (incumbent)	6,187	100.0
Total votes		6,187	100.0

=== District 157 ===
157th district Republican primary
Party	Candidate	Votes	%
Republican	Bradley Anderson	5,138	66.2
Republican	Bill Werkheiser (incumbent)	2,618	33.8
Total votes		7,756	100.0

157th district Democratic primary
Party	Candidate	Votes	%
Democratic	Micah King	1,803	100.0
Total votes		1,803	100.0

=== District 158 ===
158th district Republican primary
Party	Candidate	Votes	%
Republican	Butch Parrish (incumbent)	5,870	100.0
Total votes		5,870	100.0

=== District 159 ===
159th district Republican primary
Party	Candidate	Votes	%
Republican	Jon G. Burns (incumbent)	5,108	75.2
Republican	Nathan Hooks	1,689	24.8
Total votes		6,797	100.0

=== District 160 ===
160th district Republican primary
Party	Candidate	Votes	%
Republican	Lehman Franklin (incumbent)	4,647	100.0
Total votes		4,647	100.0

=== District 161 ===
Incumbent Republican Bill Hitchens is running for re-election. His Democratic challenger, David Dillie, faces an eligibility challenge over allegations he voted in both Georgia and Nevada's primary elections. If he is disqualified, Hitchens will be declared the winner by default.

161st district Republican primary
Party	Candidate	Votes	%
Republican	Bill Hitchens (incumbent)	4,055	100.0
Total votes		4,055	100.0

161st district Democratic primary
Party	Candidate	Votes	%
Democratic	David Dillie	3,872	100.0
Total votes		3,872	100.0

=== District 162 ===
162nd district Democratic primary
Party	Candidate	Votes	%
Democratic	Orlando Scott	6,041	100.0
Total votes		6,041	100.0

=== District 163 ===
163rd district Democratic primary
Party	Candidate	Votes	%
Democratic	Anne Allen Westbrook (incumbent)	6,945	100.0
Total votes		6,945	100.0

=== District 164 ===
164th district Republican primary
Party	Candidate	Votes	%
Republican	Ron Stephens (incumbent)	4,644	100.0
Total votes		4,644	100.0

164th district Democratic primary
Party	Candidate	Votes	%
Democratic	Stephanie Burgess	4,860	100.0
Total votes		4,860	100.0

=== District 165 ===
165th district Democratic primary
Party	Candidate	Votes	%
Democratic	MiQuan Green	4,209	53.5
Democratic	Kendra Clark	2,787	35.4
Democratic	Jaylen Morris	877	11.1
Total votes		7,873	100.0

=== District 166 ===
166th district Republican primary
Party	Candidate	Votes	%
Republican	Jesse Petrea (incumbent)	10,678	100.0
Total votes		10,678	100.0

166th district Democratic primary
Party	Candidate	Votes	%
Democratic	Pat Daley	4,491	100.0
Total votes		4,491	100.0

=== District 167 ===
167th district Republican primary
Party	Candidate	Votes	%
Republican	Buddy DeLoach (incumbent)	6,171	100.0
Total votes		6,171	100.0

167th district Democratic primary
Party	Candidate	Votes	%
Democratic	Nathaniel Hicks Jr.	1,819	52.8
Democratic	Laurie Thompson	1,629	47.2
Total votes		3,448	100.0

=== District 168 ===
168th district Republican primary
Party	Candidate	Votes	%
Republican	Kevin Remillard	1,998	100.0
Total votes		1,998	100.0

168th district Democratic primary
Party	Candidate	Votes	%
Democratic	Al Williams (incumbent)	3,727	61.5
Democratic	Sabrina Newby	2,333	38.5
Total votes		6,060	100.0

=== District 169 ===
169th district Republican primary
Party	Candidate	Votes	%
Republican	Angie O'Steen (incumbent)	5,804	100.0
Total votes		5,804	100.0

=== District 170 ===
170th district Republican primary
Party	Candidate	Votes	%
Republican	Jaclyn Ford (incumbent)	5,498	100.0
Total votes		5,498	100.0

=== District 171 ===
171st district Republican primary
Party	Candidate	Votes	%
Republican	Joe Campbell (incumbent)	4,135	100.0
Total votes		4,135	100.0

=== District 172 ===
172nd district Republican primary
Party	Candidate	Votes	%
Republican	Charles Cannon (incumbent)	5,019	100.0
Total votes		5,019	100.0

=== District 173 ===
173rd district Republican primary
Party	Candidate	Votes	%
Republican	Darlene Taylor (incumbent)	4,766	100.0
Total votes		4,766	100.0

173rd district Democratic primary
Party	Candidate	Votes	%
Democratic	Adam Chitwood	1,852	52.0
Democratic	Anue Thomas	1,707	48.0
Total votes		3,559	100.0

=== District 174 ===
174th district Republican primary
Party	Candidate	Votes	%
Republican	John Corbett (incumbent)	6,357	100.0
Total votes		6,357	100.0

174th district Democratic primary
Party	Candidate	Votes	%
Democratic	David Hall	1,317	100.0
Total votes		1,317	100.0

=== District 175 ===
175th district Republican primary
Party	Candidate	Votes	%
Republican	John LaHood (incumbent)	5,178	100.0
Total votes		5,178	100.0

175th district Democratic primary
Party	Candidate	Votes	%
Democratic	Anissa Wiseman	2,845	100.0
Total votes		2,845	100.0

=== District 176 ===
176th district Republican primary
Party	Candidate	Votes	%
Republican	James Burchett (incumbent)	4,554	82.4
Republican	Michael Dockery	972	17.6
Total votes		5,526	100.0

176th district Democratic primary
Party	Candidate	Votes	%
Democratic	Marcus Ryan	1,594	100.0
Total votes		1,594	100.0

=== District 177 ===
177th district Democratic primary
Party	Candidate	Votes	%
Democratic	Elsie Napier	1,197	30.00
Democratic	Alvin Payton (incumbent)	1,025	25.7
Democratic	Kristina McBride	747	18.7
Democratic	Eric Howard	605	15.1
Democratic	Blake Robinson	421	10.5
Total votes		3,995	100.0

177th district Democratic primary runoff
Party	Candidate	Votes	%
Democratic	Elsie Napier	858	58.4
Democratic	Alvin Payton (incumbent)	611	41.6
Total votes		1,469	100.0

=== District 178 ===
178th district Republican primary
Party	Candidate	Votes	%
Republican	Steven Meeks (incumbent)	8,514	100.0
Total votes		8,514	100.0

178th district Democratic primary
Party	Candidate	Votes	%
Democratic	Barry Dunham	1,205	100.0
Total votes		1,205	100.0

=== District 179 ===
179th district Republican primary
Party	Candidate	Votes	%
Republican	Rick Townsend (incumbent)	5,795	100.0
Total votes		5,795	100.0

=== District 180 ===
180th district Republican primary
Party	Candidate	Votes	%
Republican	Steven Sainz (incumbent)	5,068	100.0
Total votes		5,068	100.0
