= Farooq Mughal =

American politician

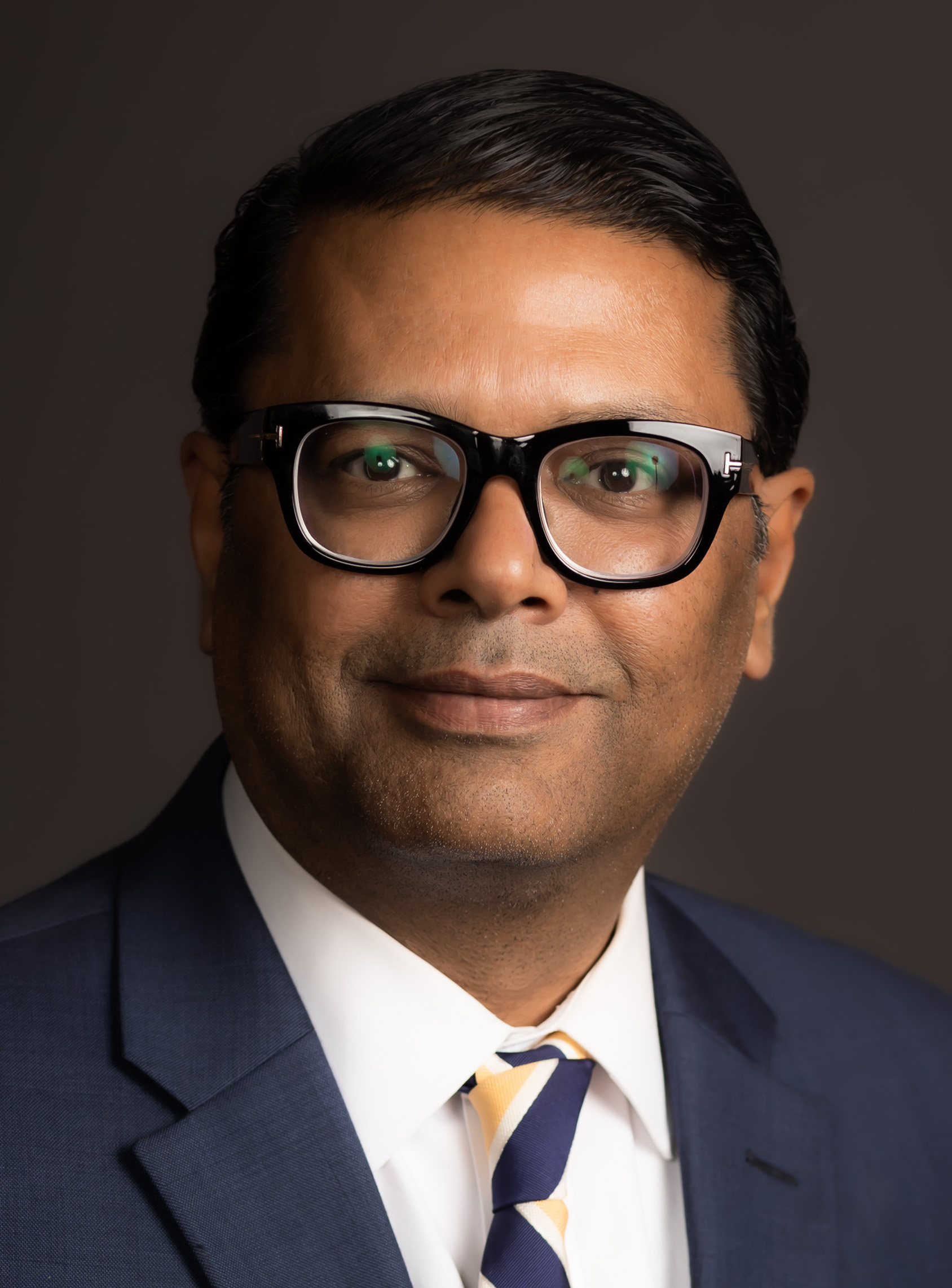
- Official portrait, 2023

Member of the Georgia House of Representatives from the 105th district
- In office January 31, 2023 – January 15, 2025
- Preceded by: Donna McLeod
- Succeeded by: Sandy Donatucci

Personal details
- Party: Democratic
- Education: Mercer University
- Website: Campaign website

Farooq Mughal is an American politician from Georgia. A member of the Democratic Party, he served as a member of the Georgia House of Representatives from District 105 from 2023 to 2025. The district includes parts of the cities of Buford, Lawrenceville, and Dacula in Gwinnett County.

== Biography ==
Mughal is a Pakistani American. His parents moved from Pakistan to Lawrenceville, Georgia. He later founded MS Global Partners, a government affairs firm.

He was elected to the Georgia House of Representatives in 2022, becoming the first Pakistani American elected to the legislature. Mughal was defeated for re-election in 2024 by Republican Sandy Donatucci by a margin of 80 votes after redistricting drew more conservative voters into his district. He announced he would run for his old seat in the 2026 election.
