= Mauldin =

Mauldin can refer to:

== People ==
- Bill Mauldin (1921–2003), American editorial cartoonist
- Brett Mauldin, American politician
- Greg Mauldin (born 1982), American ice hockey player
- Joe B. Mauldin (1940–2015), American bass guitarist
- Bessie Lee Mauldin (1920–1983), American double bass player and Blue Grass Boy
- Lorenzo Mauldin (born 1992), American football player
- Michael Mauldin (producer) (born 1953), American media proprietor and record executive
- Michael Loren Mauldin (born 1959), American computer scientist
- William L. Mauldin (1845–1912), South Carolina politician and railroad executive

== Places ==
- Mauldin, Arkansas
- Mauldin, South Carolina
  - Mauldin High School

== Other ==
- Mauldin v. Wal-Mart Stores, Inc., class action lawsuit
- Hryniak v Mauldin, a leading Supreme Court of Canada case on when summary judgements are appropriate
