= Trey Sheppard =

American politician

Member of the Georgia House of Representatives from the 128th district
- Member-elect
- Assumed office January 11, 2027
- Preceded by: Mack Jackson

Personal details
- Party: Republican
- Website: Official website

Trey Sheppard is an American politician who is a member-elect of the Georgia House of Representatives, representing the 114th district. He was elected to the Georgia House of Representatives, in the general election on November 3, 2026. The district contains all of Washington, Hancock, Glascock and Warren counties and parts of Baldwin and McDuffie counties. He is a co-president of a transportation and logistics company.
