= Soracco (surname) =

Soracco is a surname, and may refer to:

- Scott Soracco, American politician
- Rodolfo Soracco, Peruvian basketball player
