= Jack Miller (Georgia politician) =

American politician

Member of the Georgia House of Representatives from the 47th district
- Member-elect
- Assumed office January 11, 2027
- Preceded by: Jan Jones

Personal details
- Party: Republican
- Website: Official website

Jack Miller is an American politician who is a member-elect of the Georgia House of Representatives, representing the 47th district. He was elected to the Georgia House of Representatives, in the general election on November 3, 2026.
