= Juan Estrada (politician) =

American politician from Georgia

Member of the Georgia House of Representatives from the 109th district
- Incumbent
- Assumed office TBD
- Preceded by: Dewey McClain

Personal details
- Born: California, U.S.
- Party: Democratic
- Education: Georgia Gwinnett College; Georgia State University College of Law

Juan Estrada Jr. is an American personal injury attorney and politician. A member of the Democratic Party, Estrada is the member-elect for the 109th district of the Georgia House of Representatives in the 2026.

== Early life and education ==
Estrada was born in California and raised in Gwinnett County, Georgia. His father is from Mexico and his mother is from Honduras. Estrada graduated from Norcross High School, Georgia Gwinnett College, and Georgia State University College of Law.
