= Brett Mauldin =

American politician

Member of the Georgia House of Representatives from the 114th district
- Member-elect
- Assumed office January 11, 2027
- Preceded by: Tim Fleming

Personal details
- Born: Marietta, Georgia
- Party: Republican
- Education: Lee University
- Website: Official website

Brett Mauldin is an American politician who is a member-elect of the Georgia House of Representatives, representing the 114th district. He was elected to the Georgia House of Representatives, in the general election on November 3, 2026. The district contains parts of Morgan, Newton, and Walton counties. Mauldin is a small business owner.
