= Chris Dockery =

American politician

Member of the Georgia House of Representatives from the 9th district
- Member-elect
- Assumed office January 11, 2027
- Preceded by: Will Wade

Personal details
- Party: Republican
- Website: Official website

Chris Dockery is an American politician who is a member-elect of the Georgia House of Representatives, representing the 9th district. He was elected unopposed to the Georgia House of Representatives, in the general election on November 3, 2026. He supports congressional term limits. He was previously Lumpkin County Commission Chair.
