= Stephanie Burgess =

American politician

Member of the Georgia House of Representatives from the 164th district
- Member-elect
- Assumed office January 11, 2027
- Preceded by: Ron Stephens

Personal details
- Party: Democratic
- Education: Savannah State University; Texas Southern University; Thurgood Marshall School of Law
- Website: Official website

Stephanie Burgess is an American politician who is a member-elect of the Georgia House of Representatives, representing the 164th district. She was elected to the Georgia House of Representatives, in the general election on November 3, 2026. She unseated Republican incumbent Ron Stephens.
