= Elisa Lassiter =

American politician

Member-elect of the Georgia House of Representatives from the 40th district
- Assuming office January 11, 2027
- Succeeding: Kimberly New

Personal details
- Party: Democratic
- Education: Georgia State University; University of West Alabama
- Website: Official website

Elisa Yvette Lassiter is an American politician who is a member-elect of the Georgia House of Representatives, representing the 40th district. She was elected to the Georgia House of Representatives, in the general election on November 3, 2026. She unseated Republican incumbent Kimberly New. She is a public servant and community advocate.
