= Kim Thomas Smith =

American politician

Member of the Georgia House of Representatives from the 117th district
- Member-elect
- Assumed office January 11, 2027
- Preceded by: Mary Ann Santos

Personal details
- Party: Democratic
- Education: Fort Valley State University
- Website: Official website

Kim Thomas Smith is an American politician who is a member-elect of the Georgia House of Representatives, representing the 117th district.

== Career ==
She is a medical doctor by profession. She graduated from Fort Valley State University. She was elected unopposed to the Georgia House of Representatives, in the general election on November 3, 2026.
