= Bradley Anderson =

American politician

Member of the Georgia House of Representatives from the 157th district
- Member-elect
- Assumed office January 11, 2027
- Preceded by: Bill Werkheiser

Personal details
- Party: Republican
- Website: Official website

Bradley Anderson is an American politician who is a member-elect of the Georgia House of Representatives, representing the 157th district. He was elected to the Georgia House of Representatives, in the general election on November 3, 2026. He was previously a candidate for Coroner of Tattnall County in 2020. He supports term limits.
