= Bella Bautista =

American beauty pageant titleholder and activist

- Born: 2002/2003 (age 23–24)
- Education: Oglethorpe University
- Occupations: Beauty queen Activist
- Beauty pageant titleholder
- Title: Miss Buckhead USA 2025
- Hair color: Brown
- Eye color: Brown
- Major competitions: Miss International Queen USA; Miss Georgia USA 2025 (Withdrew); Miss and Mister Supranational USA

Bella Bautista (born 2002/2003) is an American beauty pageant titleholder, political candidate, and transgender rights activist. She served as Miss Buckhead USA 2025 and became the first openly transgender woman set to compete in the Miss Georgia USA pageant, but relinquished her title and resigned from the pageant in March 2025. During the 2026 Georgia House of Representatives election, she became the first openly transgender woman to win a state primary in Georgia.

== Early life and education ==
Bautista grew up in Cartersville, Georgia. She is of Mexican descent. She studies economics and history at Oglethorpe University, where she was a member of the cheerleading squad.

== Career ==
=== Activism ===
Bautista is the founder and executive director of "This Doesn't Define Me", a nonprofit transgender rights organization.

In 2025, Bautista testified before the Georgia State Senate Committee on Education and Youth against Georgia HB 267, a bill that proposed banning transgender athletes from competing in school sports. Bautista also testified before the Georgia House of Representatives on behalf of transgender rights. She detailed her personal experiences as a transgender woman on a college cheerleading squad. On March 4, 2025, she spoke at a pro-LGBTQ+ rights rally organized by the Human Rights Campaign at the Georgia State Capitol to protest proposed anti-LGBTQ+ legislation.

In March 2025, after withdrawing from the Miss Georgia USA pageant, Bautista filed a lawsuit against Greenwood Productions, a production company in charge of producing the pageant owned by Kim Greenwood and Lee Greenwood, who both publicly endorsed Donald Trump in the 2024 United States presidential election and attended his presidential inauguration in January 2025.

In June 2025, Bautista spoke at WorldPride in Washington, D.C.

Bautista is a social media intern for the Global Trans Equity Project.

=== Pageants ===
In January 2025, Bautista competed in Miss International Queen USA, a pageant for transgender women.

She won the title of Miss Buckhead USA 2025, a regional pageant in Georgia under the Miss USA organization. In 2025, she became the first openly transgender woman to compete in the Miss Georgia USA pageant. In March 2025, Bautista withdrew from the Miss Georgia USA pageant and relinquished her title as Miss Buckhead USA 2025. In a statement she released on March 17, 2025, Bautista said she withdrew from the competition due to her personal values and mission for inclusivity and anti-discrimination did not align with the pageant's actions and affiliations.

In May 2025, she competed in the Miss and Mister Supranational USA pageant, representing Tennessee.

=== Politics ===
In 2026, Bautista ran uncontested in the Democratic primary for District 14 of the Georgia House of Representatives election, becoming the first openly transgender woman to win a primary in the state.
