= Beth Fuller =

American politician

Member of the Georgia House of Representatives from the 53rd district
- Member-elect
- Assumed office January 11, 2027
- Preceded by: Deborah Silcox

Personal details
- Party: Democratic
- Education: Emory University; Columbia University; University of Alabama, Birmingham
- Website: Official website

Beth Fuller is an American politician who is a member-elect of the Georgia House of Representatives, representing the 53rd district. She was elected to the Georgia House of Representatives, in the general election on November 3, 2026. Her father was a judge. She is a public health professional from Sandy Springs.
