= Melissa Stuckey =

American politician

Member of the Georgia House of Representatives from the 70th district
- Member-elect
- Assumed office January 11, 2027
- Preceded by: Lynn Smith

Personal details
- Party: Republican

Melissa Dawn Stuckey is an American politician who is a member-elect of the Georgia House of Representatives, representing the 70th district. She was elected to the Georgia House of Representatives, in the general election on November 3, 2026. She is a business executive and community leader from Newnan, Georgia.
