= Chad Bingham =

American politician

Member of the Georgia House of Representatives from the 31st district
- Member-elect
- Assumed office January 11, 2027
- Preceded by: Emory Dunahoo

Personal details
- Party: Republican
- Website: Official website

Chad Bingham is an American politician who is a member of the Georgia House of Representatives, representing the 31st district. He announced his campaign in July 2026. He was elected unopposed to the Georgia House of Representatives, in the general election on November 3, 2026. Bingham is a former Jackson County Commissioner. He ran for chairman in 2024.
