= Mishael White =

American politician

Member of the Georgia House of Representatives from the 81st district
- Member-elect
- Assumed office January 11, 2027
- Preceded by: Noelle Kahaian

Personal details
- Born: New Orleans, Louisiana
- Party: Democratic
- Website: Official website

Mishael White is an American politician who is a member-elect of the Georgia House of Representatives, representing the 81st district. He represents parts of Henry County. He was elected to the Georgia House of Representatives, in the general election on November 3, 2026. He supports term limits. White is a commercial truck driver, small business owner and community advocate.
