= Jyot Singh =

American politician

- Singh in 2026

GA Rep-Elect

Member-elect of the Georgia House of Representatives 97th District
- Assuming office January 11, 2027
- Succeeding: Ruwa Romman

Personal details
- Party: Democratic
- Education: Yale University (BA); Gwinnett School of Mathematics, Science, and Technology
- Website: Official website

Jyot Singh is an American politician who is a member-elect of the Georgia House of Representatives, representing the 97th district. He was elected to the Georgia House of Representatives, in the general election on November 3, 2026. He is a civil rights advocate and small business owner in Gwinnett County, Georgia. He is the first Sikh and first Indian American elected to the Georgia General Assembly.
