= Marquese Averett =

American politician

Member of the Georgia House of Representatives from the 140th district
- Member-elect
- Assumed office January 11, 2027
- Preceded by: Teddy Reese

Personal details
- Party: Democratic
- Website: Official website

Marquese Averett is an American politician who is a member-elect of the Georgia House of Representatives, representing the 140th district. He was elected to the Georgia House of Representatives, in the general election on November 3, 2026. He was previously a candidate for Columbus City Council District 7. He was managing director of the Partnership for Southern Equity (PSE).
