= Karla Hooper =

American politician

Member of the Georgia House of Representatives from the 113th district
- Member-elect
- Assumed office January 11, 2027
- Preceded by: Sharon Henderson

Personal details
- Born: Arkadelphia, Arkansas
- Party: Democratic
- Education: Emory University; Mercer University
- Website: Official website

Karla Daniels Hooper is an American politician who is a member-elect of the Georgia House of Representatives, representing the 113th district. She was elected to the Georgia House of Representatives, in the general election on November 3, 2026. She was the executive director of the Diabetes Association of Atlanta (DAA).
