= David Dillie =

American politician

Member of the Georgia House of Representatives from the 161st district
- Member-elect
- Assumed office January 11, 2027
- Preceded by: Bill Hitchens

Personal details
- Party: Democratic
- Website: Official website

David Dillie is an American politician who is a member-elect of the Georgia House of Representatives, representing the 161st district. He was elected to the Georgia House of Representatives, in the general election on November 3, 2026. He unseated incumbent Republican Bill Hitchens.
