= Kenn Collier =

American politician

Member of the Georgia House of Representatives from the 62nd district
- Member-elect
- Assumed office January 11, 2027
- Preceded by: Tanya Miller

Personal details
- Party: Democratic
- Website: Official website

Kenneth (Kenn) Collier is an American politician who is a member-elect of the Georgia House of Representatives, representing the 62nd district. He was elected unopposed to the Georgia House of Representatives, in the general election on November 3, 2026. He is the founder of Future Without Fears, an anti gun violence organization. He is an author and speaker.
