= Timoria McQueen Saba =

American politician

Member of the Georgia House of Representatives from the 68th district
- Member-elect
- Assumed office January 11, 2027
- Preceded by: Derrick Jackson

Personal details
- Party: Democratic
- Education: William James College
- Website: Official website

Timoria McQueen Saba is an American politician who is a member-elect of the Georgia House of Representatives, representing the 68th district.

== Career ==
She is an advocate and writer on maternal health. She announced her campaign for state house in June 2026. She was elected unopposed to the Georgia House of Representatives, in the general election on November 3, 2026.

== Personal life ==
She and her husband have two daughters.
