= Rahim Asani =

American politician

Member-elect of the Georgia House of Representatives from the 108th district
- Assuming office January 11, 2027
- Succeeding: Jasmine Clark

Personal details
- Born: Karachi, Pakistan
- Party: Democratic
- Website: Official website

Rahim Asani is a Pakistan-born American politician who is a member-elect of the Georgia House of Representatives, representing the 108th district. He was elected to the Georgia House of Representatives, in the general election on November 3, 2026. He was born in Karachi, Pakistan
