= Scott Soracco =

American politician

Member of the Georgia House of Representatives from the 29th district
- Member-elect
- Assumed office January 11, 2027
- Preceded by: Matt Dubnik

Personal details
- Party: Democratic
- Education: Woodward Academy; North Georgia College; United States Army War College
- Website: Official website

Military service
- Allegiance: United States
- Branch/service: United States Army
- Years of service: 1984-2012
- Battles/wars: Gulf War; Bosnian War; Iraq War

Scott Soracco is an American politician who is a member-elect of the Georgia House of Representatives, representing the 117th district. He was elected to the Georgia House of Representatives, in the general election on November 3, 2026. He is a retired Army officer and former federal emergency management official.
