= Robert Flournoy =

American politician

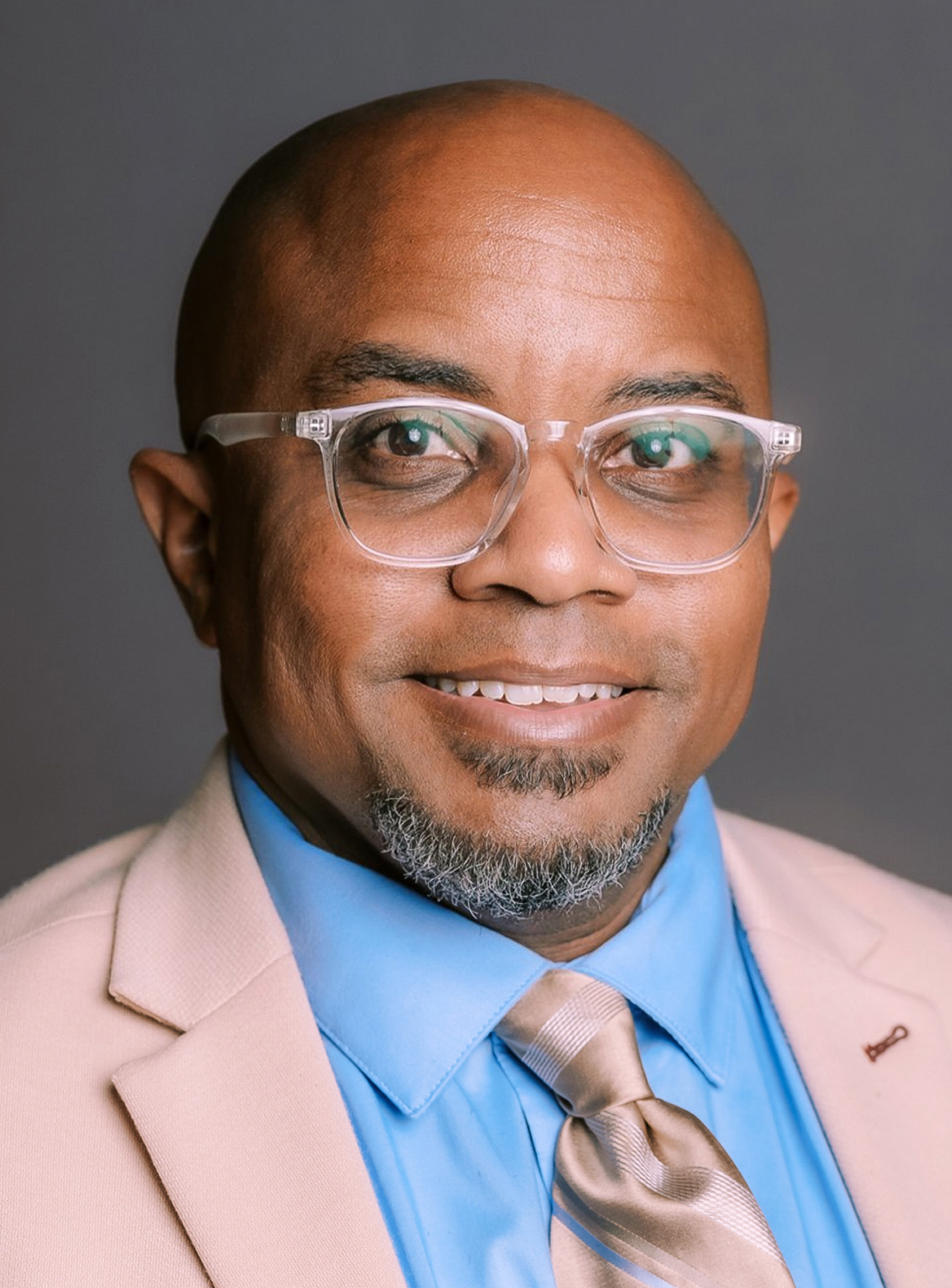

Member of the Georgia House of Representatives from the 74th district
- Incumbent
- Assumed office January 13, 2025
- Succeeded by: Karen Mathiak

Personal details
- Party: Democratic

Robert Eugene Flournoy Jr. is an American politician who was elected member of the Georgia House of Representatives for the 74th district in 2024.
