= Georgia's 64th House of Representatives district =

State district in Georgia, USA

Georgia's 64th State House of Representatives district
Representative
Sylvia Wayfer Baker; D–Douglasville
- Demographics: 25.5% White; 63.5% Black; 7.7% Hispanic; 1.9% Asian
- Population: 56,232

District 64 elects one member of the Georgia House of Representatives. It contains parts of Douglas County.

== Members ==
- Roger Bruce (2005–2013)
- Virgil Fludd (2002–2017)
- Derrick Jackson (2017–2023)
- Kimberly New (2023–2025)
- Sylvia Wayfer Baker (since 2025)
