= Sylvia Wayfer Baker =

American politician

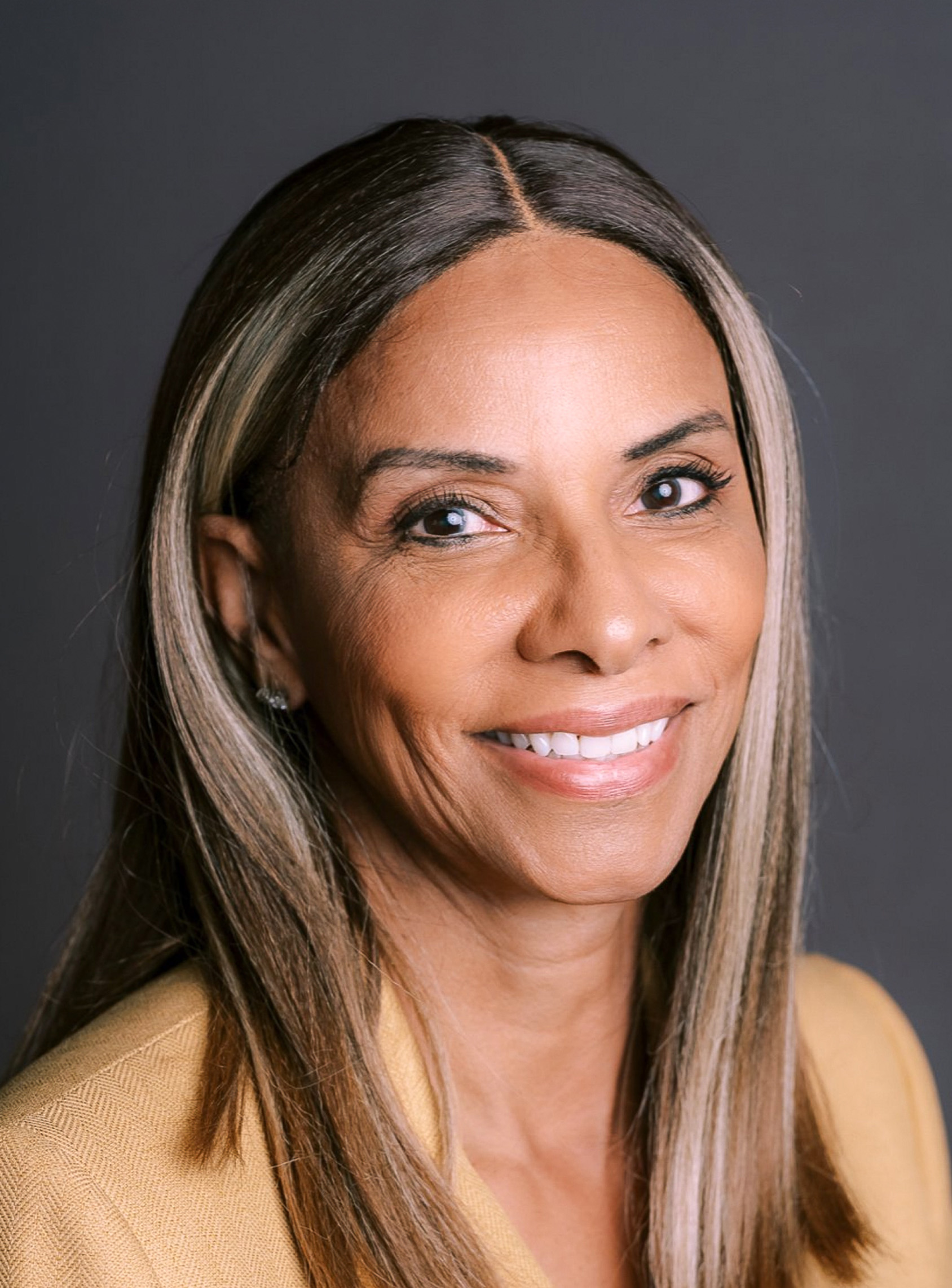

Member of the Georgia House of Representatives from the 64th district
- Incumbent
- Assumed office January 13, 2025
- Preceded by: Kimberly New

Personal details
- Party: Democratic

Sylvia Wayfer Baker is an American politician who was elected member of the Georgia House of Representatives for the 64th district in 2024.

She was a candidate for Douglas County Superior Court Clerk.
