= Josh Clark (politician) =

American politician (born 1979)

Member of the Georgia House of Representatives from the 98th district
- In office January 2011 – January 2015
- Succeeded by: David Clark

Personal details
- Born: June 14, 1979 (age 47) Gwinnett County, Georgia, U.S.
- Party: Republican
- Children: 6

Josh Clark (born June 14, 1979) is an American politician who served as a member of the Georgia House of Representatives for the 98th district from 2011 to 2015.

== Career ==
=== Georgia House of Representatives ===
Clark was first elected to the Georgia House of Representatives in 2011 and left office in 2015. In 2012, Clark received the Defender of Liberty Award from the American Conservative Union.

=== 2022 U.S. Senate campaign ===
Clark was a Republican primary candidate for the 2022 United States Senate election in Georgia. Clark lost the primary, coming fourth. Herschel Walker received the nomination.
