= Mathewos Samson =

American politician

Member of the Georgia House of Representatives from the 58th district
- Member-elect
- Assumed office January 11, 2027
- Preceded by: Park Cannon

Personal details
- Born: Atlanta
- Party: Democratic
- Other political affiliations: Democratic Socialists of America (Note: The Democratic Socialists of America (DSA) are not a registered political party. Instead, they are a political organization for those with democratic socialist ideologies.)
- Website: Official website

Mathewos Samson is an American politician who is a member-elect of the Georgia House of Representatives, representing the 58th district. He is a member of Democratic Socialists of America.

== Career ==
In 2026, Samson ran for the Georgia State Representatives in the 58th district to replace outgoing state representative Park Cannon. During the primary, Samson was endorsed by the Democratic Socialists of America and LGBTQ Victory Fund. He advanced from the May 19th primary and defeated Demetria Henderson in the June 16th runoff. In November, Samson defeated Republican Torrey Balam in a landslide, carrying 92% of the vote.

== Personal life ==
Samson is bisexual. He is the son of immigrants from Ethiopia.
