= Sandy Donatucci =

American politician

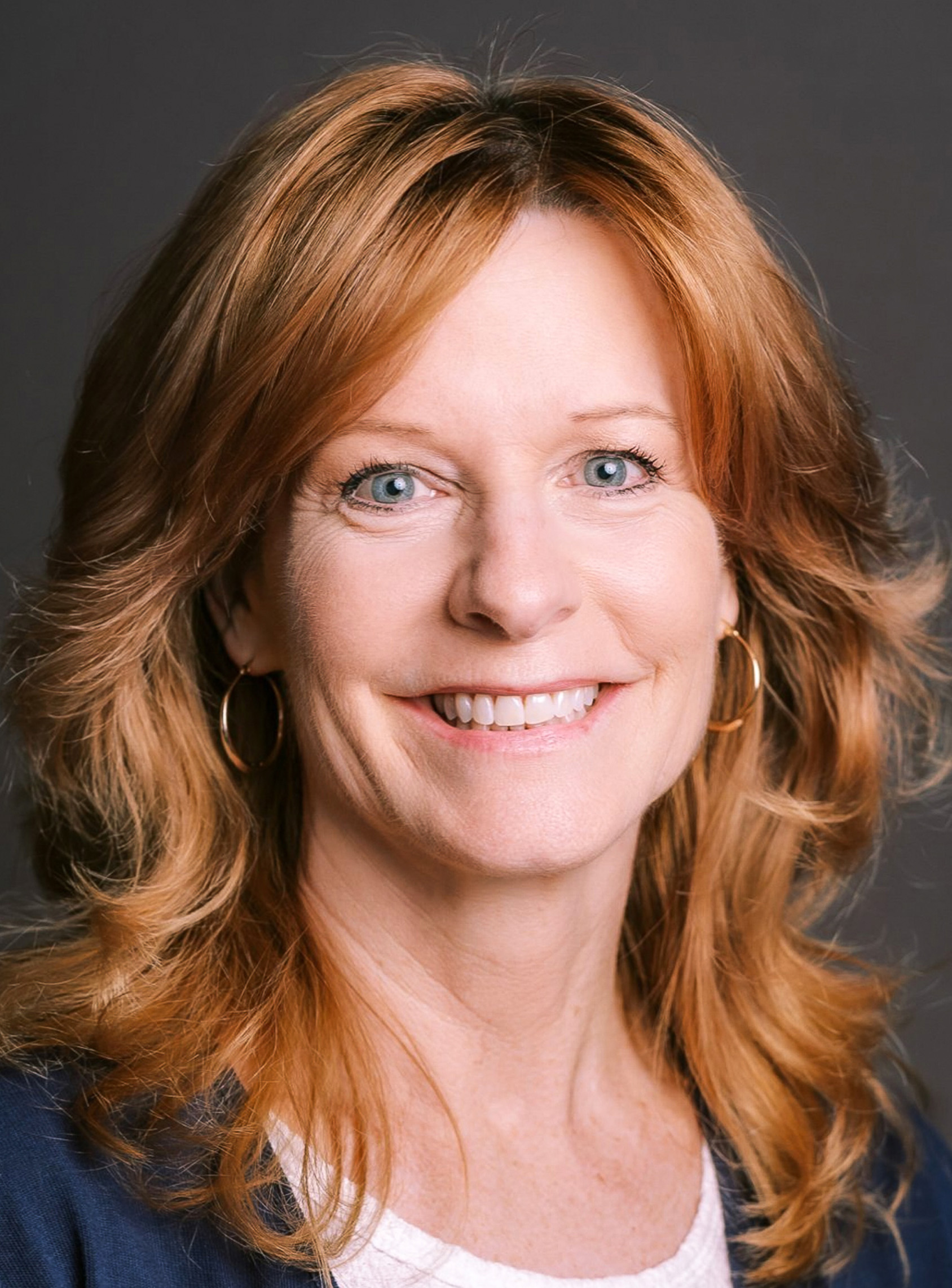
- Official portrait, 2025

Member of the Georgia House of Representatives from the 105th district
- Incumbent
- Assumed office January 13, 2025

Personal details
- Party: Republican
- Website: https://www.sandyforhouse.com/

Sandra Lynn Donatucci is an American politician who was elected member of the Georgia House of Representatives for the 105th district in 2024.

Donatucci is from Buford, Georgia. She is a mother, businesswoman, military spouse, and community leader.
