= Georgia's 47th House of Representatives district =

State district in Georgia, USA

Georgia's 47th State House of Representatives district
Representative
| Jan Jones; R–Milton |
- Demographics: 70.0% White; 11.8% Black; 5.4% Hispanic; 10.2% Asian
- Population: 56,198

District 47 elects one member of the Georgia House of Representatives. It contains parts of Cherokee County and Fulton County.

== Members ==
- Jan Jones (since 2003)
