= Georgia's 114th House of Representatives district =

State district in Georgia, USA

Georgia's 114th State House of Representatives district
Representative
Tim Fleming; R–Covington
- Demographics: 73.0% White; 16.9% Black; 6.1% Hispanic; 1.8% Asian
- Population: 57,091

District 114 elects one member of the Georgia House of Representatives. It contains the entirety of Morgan County and parts of Newton County and Walton County.

== Members ==
- Tom Kirby (2013–2023)
- Tim Fleming (since 2023)
