= 2020 Georgia House of Representatives election =

- November 3, 2020

All 180 seats in the Georgia House of Representatives 91 seats needed for a majority
- Turnout: 63.01% ▲9.02 pp
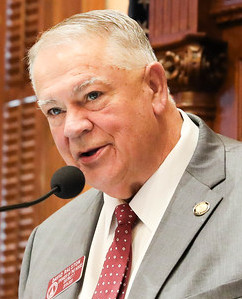

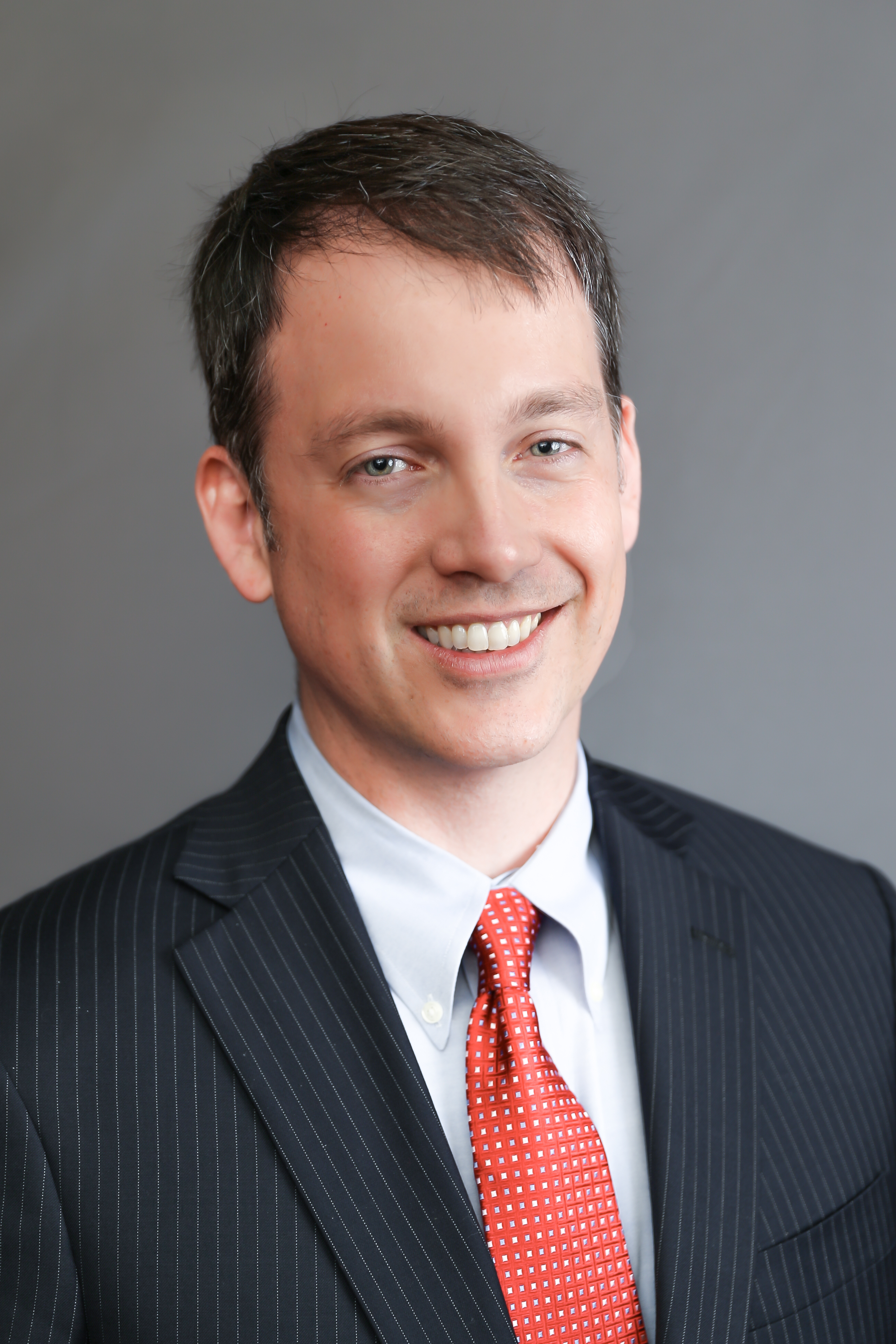
	Majority party	Minority party
Leader	David Ralston	Bob Trammell (lost re-election)
Party	Republican	Democratic
Leader since	January 11, 2010	July 24, 2017
Leader's seat	7th	132nd
Last election	105	75
Seats after	103	77
Seat change	▼2	▲2
Popular vote	2,338,983	2,217,983
Percentage	51.31%	48.66%
Swing	▼2.97%	▲3.08%
- Results: Democratic hold Democratic gain Republican hold Republican gain
Speaker before election
David Ralston
Republican
Elected Speaker
David Ralston
Republican

The 2020 Georgia House of Representatives elections took place on November 3, 2020 as part of the biennial United States elections. Georgia voters elected state representatives in all 180 of the state house's districts to the 156th Georgia General Assembly. State representatives serve two-year terms in the Georgia House of Representatives.

Primaries were held on June 9, 2020, coinciding with primaries for U.S. President, U.S. Senate, U.S. House, Georgia House of Representatives, county and regional prosecutorial offices, and primary runoffs are scheduled for August 11, 2020, to determine which candidates will appear on the November 3 ballot.

To reclaim control of the chamber from Republicans, the Democrats needed to net 16 seats. Democrats filed candidacies for 141 total seats in the State House, the highest number of Democratic candidacies for State House since the 1990s.

Republicans retained control of the chamber with 103 seats, but suffered a net loss of 2 seats.

== Predictions ==
Source	Ranking	As of
The Cook Political Report	Lean R	October 21, 2020

== Summary by district ==
District	2020 Pres.	Incumbent	Party	Elected	Outcome
1		Colton Moore	Rep	Mike Cameron	Rep hold
2		Steve Tarvin	Rep	Steve Tarvin	Rep hold
3		Dewayne Hill	Rep	Dewayne Hill	Rep hold
4		Kasey Carpenter	Rep	Kasey Carpenter	Rep hold
5		Matt Barton	Rep	Matt Barton	Rep hold
6		Jason Ridley	Rep	Jason Ridley	Rep hold
7		David Ralston	Rep	David Ralston	Rep hold
8		Matt Gurtler	Rep	Stan Gunter	Rep hold
9		Kevin Tanner	Rep	Will Wade	Rep hold
10		Terry Rogers	Rep	Victor Anderson	Rep hold
11		Rick Jasperse	Rep	Rick Jasperse	Rep hold
12		Eddie Lumsden	Rep	Eddie Lumsden	Rep hold
13		Katie Dempsey	Rep	Katie Dempsey	Rep hold
14		Mitchell Scoggins	Rep	Mitchell Scoggins	Rep hold
15		Matthew Gambill	Rep	Matthew Gambill	Rep hold
16		Trey Kelley	Rep	Trey Kelley	Rep hold
17		Martin Momtahan	Rep	Martin Momtahan	Rep hold
18		Kevin Cooke	Rep	Tyler Smith	Rep hold
19		Joseph Gullett	Rep	Joseph Gullett	Rep hold
20		Michael Caldwell	Rep	Charlice Byrd	Rep hold
21		Scot Turner	Rep	Brad Thomas	Rep hold
22		Wes Cantrell	Rep	Wes Cantrell	Rep hold
23		Mandi Ballinger	Rep	Mandi Ballinger	Rep hold
24		Sheri Smallwood Gilligan	Rep	Sheri Smallwood Gilligan	Rep hold
25		Todd Jones	Rep	Todd Jones	Rep hold
26		Marc Morris	Rep	Lauren McDonald	Rep hold
27		Lee Hawkins	Rep	Lee Hawkins	Rep hold
28		Chris Erwin	Rep	Chris Erwin	Rep hold
29		Matt Dubnik	Rep	Matt Dubnik	Rep hold
30		Emory Dunahoo Jr	Rep	Emory Dunahoo Jr	Rep hold
31		Tommy Benton	Rep	Tommy Benton	Rep hold
32		Alan Powell	Rep	Alan Powell	Rep hold
33		Tom McCall	Rep	Rob Leverett	Rep hold
34		Bert Reeves	Rep	Bert Reeves	Rep hold
35		Ed Setzler	Rep	Ed Setzler	Rep hold
36		Ginny Ehrhart	Rep	Ginny Ehrhart	Rep hold
37		Mary Frances Williams	Dem	Mary Frances Williams	Dem Hold
38		David Wilkerson	Dem	David Wilkerson	Dem Hold
39		Erica Thomas	Dem	Erica Thomas	Dem Hold
40		Erick Eugene Allen	Dem	Erick Eugene Allen	Dem Hold
41					
42					
43					
44					
45					
46					
47					
48					
49					
50					
51					
52					
53					
54					
55					
56					
57					
58					
59					
60					
61					
62					
63					
64					
65					
66					
67					
68					
69					
70					
71					
72					
73					
74					
75					
76					
77					
78					
79					
80					
81					
82					
83					
84					
85					
86					
87					
88					
89					
90					
91					
92					
93					
94					
95					
96					
97					
98					
99					
100					
101					
102					
103					
104					
105					
106					
107					
108					
109					
110					
111					
112					
113					
114					
115					
116					
117					
118					
119					
120					
121					
122					
123					
124					
125					
126					
127					
128					
129					
130					
131					
132					
133					
134					
135					
136					
137					
138					
139					
140					
141					
142					
143					
144					
145					
146					
147					
148					
149					
150					
151					
152					
153					
154					
155					
156					
157					
158					
159					
160					
161					
162					
163					
164					
165					
166					
167					
168					
169					
170					
171					
172					
173					
174					
175					
176					
177					
178					
179					
180					

== Results ==
Popular vote
Republican	51.31%
Democratic	48.66%
Other	0.02%

House seats
Republican	57.22%
Democratic	42.78%

=== Summary ===
Summary of the November 3, 2020 Georgia House of Representatives election results
Party	Candidates	Votes	%	Seats	+/–	%
Republican	122	2,338,983	51.31%	103	-2	57.22%
Democratic	141	2,217,983	48.66%	77	+2	42.78%
Total	263		100.00%	180	–	

=== Closest races ===
Seats where the margin of victory was under 10%:

1. District 43, 0.52%
2. District 35, 0.94%
3. District 52, 1.12% (gain)
4. District 104, 2.3%
5. District 102, 3%
6. District 132, 3% (gain)
7. District 44, 3.56%
8. District 151, 3.56%
9. District 109, 3.6% (gain)
10. District 97, 4.34%
11. District 147, 4.52%
12. District 164, 5.12%
13. District 48, 5.6%
14. District 49, 5.62%
15. District 50, 5.62%
16. District 138, 7.7%
17. District 37, 7.92%
18. District 108, 9.64%
19. District 119, 9.7%
20. District 45, 9.96%

=== District 1 ===
Republican primary
Party	Candidate	Votes	%
Republican	John Deffenbaugh	3,565	41.74
Republican	Mike Cameron	3,166	37.07
Republican	Vikki Mills	1,810	21.19
Total votes		8,541	100.00

Republican primary runoff
Party	Candidate	Votes	%
Republican	Mike Cameron	2,858	56.36
Republican	John Deffenbaugh	2,213	43.64
Total votes		5,071	100.00

1st District general election
Party	Candidate	Votes	%
Republican	Mike Cameron	19,371	100.00
Total votes		19,371	100.00
Republican hold			

=== District 2 ===
Republican primary
Party	Candidate	Votes	%
Republican	Steve Tarvin (incumbent)	8,976	100.00
Total votes		8,976	100.00

2nd District general election
Party	Candidate	Votes	%
Republican	Steve Tarvin (incumbent)	21,983	100.00
Total votes		21,983	100.00
Republican hold			

=== District 3 ===
Republican primary
Party	Candidate	Votes	%
Republican	Dewayne Hill (incumbent)	5,349	61.80
Republican	Jeff Holcomb	3,307	38.20
Total votes		8,656	100.00

3rd District general election
Party	Candidate	Votes	%
Republican	Dewayne Hill (incumbent)	23,054	100.00
Total votes		23,054	100.00
Republican hold			

=== District 4 ===
Republican primary
Party	Candidate	Votes	%
Republican	Kasey Carpenter (incumbent)	4,649	100.00
Total votes		4,649	100.00

4th District general election
Party	Candidate	Votes	%
Republican	Kasey Carpenter (incumbent)	13,377	100.00
Total votes		13,377	100.00
Republican hold			

=== District 5 ===
Republican primary
Party	Candidate	Votes	%
Republican	Matt Barton (incumbent)	6,944	100.00
Total votes		6,944	100.00

5th District general election
Party	Candidate	Votes	%
Republican	Matt Barton (incumbent)	19,421	100.00
Total votes		19,421	100.00
Republican hold			

=== District 6 ===
Republican primary
Party	Candidate	Votes	%
Republican	Jason T. Ridley (incumbent)	7,369	100.00
Total votes		7,369	100.00

6th District general election
Party	Candidate	Votes	%
Republican	Jason T. Ridley (incumbent)	18,227	100.00
Total votes		18,227	100.00
Republican hold			

=== District 7 ===
Republican primary
Party	Candidate	Votes	%
Republican	David Ralston (incumbent)	12,916	100.00
Total votes		12,916	100.00

Democratic primary
Party	Candidate	Votes	%
Democratic	Rick D. Day	2,193	100.00
Total votes		2,193	100.00

7th District general election
Party	Candidate	Votes	%
Republican	David Ralston (incumbent)	27,074	83.75
Democratic	Rick D. Day	5,255	16.25
Total votes		32,329	100.00
Republican hold			

=== District 8 ===
Republican primary
Party	Candidate	Votes	%
Republican	Stan Gunter	9,917	65.29
Republican	Steve Townsend	5,273	34.71
Total votes		15,190	100.00

Democratic primary
Party	Candidate	Votes	%
Democratic	Dave Cooper	2,780	100.00
Total votes		2,193	100.00

8th District general election
Party	Candidate	Votes	%
Republican	Stan Gunter	29,195	82.00
Democratic	Dave Cooper	6,407	18.00
Total votes		35,602	100.00
Republican hold			

=== District 9 ===
Republican primary
Party	Candidate	Votes	%
Republican	Will Wade	4,617	34.36
Republican	Steve Leibel	2,748	20.45
Republican	Doug Sherrill	2,385	17.75
Republican	Zack Tumlin	1,626	12.10
Republican	Clint Smith	1,107	8.24
Republican	Tyler Tolin	954	7.10
Total votes		13,437	100.00

Republican primary runoff
Party	Candidate	Votes	%
Republican	Will Wade	4,963	66.74
Republican	Steve Leibel	2,473	33.26
Total votes		7,436	100.00

Democratic primary
Party	Candidate	Votes	%
Democratic	Sharon L. Ravert	1,833	100.00
Total votes		1,833	100.00

9th District general election
Party	Candidate	Votes	%
Republican	Will Wade	26,310	83.91
Democratic	Sharon L. Ravert	5,046	16.09
Total votes		31,356	100.00
Republican hold			

=== District 10 ===
Republican primary
Party	Candidate	Votes	%
Republican	Victor E. Anderson	5,113	42.47
Republican	Robert A. Crumley	3,637	30.21
Republican	Jimmy Dean	3,288	27.31
Total votes		12,038	100.00

Republican primary runoff
Party	Candidate	Votes	%
Republican	Victor E. Anderson	5,211	61.39
Republican	Robert A. Crumley	3,277	38.61
Total votes		8,488	100.00

Democratic primary
Party	Candidate	Votes	%
Democratic	Nick Mitchell	1,581	100.00
Total votes		1,581	100.00

10th District general election
Party	Candidate	Votes	%
Republican	Victor E. Anderson	21,396	83.87
Democratic	Nick Mitchell	4,116	16.13
Total votes		25,512	100.00
Republican hold			

=== District 11 ===
Republican primary
Party	Candidate	Votes	%
Republican	Rick Jasperse (incumbent)	10,017	82.51
Republican	Charlotte L. Williamson	2,123	17.49
Total votes		12,140	100.00

Democratic primary
Party	Candidate	Votes	%
Democratic	Kayla Hollifield	1,379	100.00
Total votes		1,581	100.00

11th District general election
Party	Candidate	Votes	%
Republican	Rick Jasperse (incumbent)	22,633	84.12
Democratic	Kayla Hollifield	4,272	15.88
Total votes		26,905	100.00
Republican hold			

=== District 12 ===
Republican primary
Party	Candidate	Votes	%
Republican	Eddie Lumsden (incumbent)	8,413	100.00
Total votes		8,413	100.00

Democratic primary
Party	Candidate	Votes	%
Democratic	Jonathan Gilreath-Harvey	1,580	100.00
Total votes		1,580	100.00

12th District general election
Party	Candidate	Votes	%
Republican	Eddie Lumsden (incumbent)	17,666	81.11
Democratic	Jonathan Gilreath-Harvey	4,114	18.89
Total votes		21,780	100.00
Republican hold			

=== District 13 ===
Republican primary
Party	Candidate	Votes	%
Republican	Katie Dempsey (incumbent)	5,606	81.36
Republican	Brad Barnes	1,284	18.64
Total votes		6,890	100.00

13th District general election
Party	Candidate	Votes	%
Republican	Katie Dempsey (incumbent)	17,421	100.00
Total votes		17,421	100.00
Republican hold			

=== District 14 ===
Republican primary
Party	Candidate	Votes	%
Republican	Mitchell Scoggins (incumbent)	8,549	100.00
Total votes		8,549	100.00

14th District general election
Party	Candidate	Votes	%
Republican	Mitchell Scoggins (incumbent)	24,279	100.00
Total votes		24,279	100.00
Republican hold			

=== District 15 ===
Republican primary
Party	Candidate	Votes	%
Republican	Matthew Gambill (incumbent)	7,411	100.00
Total votes		7,411	100.00

15th District general election
Party	Candidate	Votes	%
Republican	Matthew Gambill (incumbent)	22,536	100.00
Total votes		22,536	100.00
Republican hold			

=== District 16 ===
Republican primary
Party	Candidate	Votes	%
Republican	Trey Kelly (incumbent)	6,302	63.81
Republican	Jennifer Lankford Hulsey	3,574	36.19
Total votes		9,876	100.00

Democratic primary
Party	Candidate	Votes	%
Democratic	Lyndsay Arrendale	1,567	100.00
Total votes		1,567	100.00

16th District general election
Party	Candidate	Votes	%
Republican	Trey Kelly (incumbent)	18,106	78.11
Democratic	Lyndsay Arrendale	5,074	21.89
Total votes		23,180	100.00
Republican hold			

=== District 17 ===
Republican primary
Party	Candidate	Votes	%
Republican	Martin Momtahan (incumbent)	8,714	100.00
Total votes		8,714	100.00

Democratic primary
Party	Candidate	Votes	%
Democratic	Q. Dailey	3,392	100.00
Total votes		3,392	100.00

17th District general election
Party	Candidate	Votes	%
Republican	Martin Momtahan (incumbent)	23,833	71.69
Democratic	Q. Dailey	9,410	28.31
Total votes		33,243	100.00
Republican hold			

=== District 18 ===
Republican primary
Party	Candidate	Votes	%
Republican	Carson Hightower	4,374	46.91
Republican	Tyler Paul Smith	3,255	34.91
Republican	Daniel Lane	1,695	18.18
Total votes		9,324	100.00

Republican primary runoff
Party	Candidate	Votes	%
Republican	Tyler Paul Smith	3,774	51.34
Republican	Carson Hightower	3,577	48.66
Total votes		7,351	100.00

Democratic primary
Party	Candidate	Votes	%
Democratic	Pat Rhudy	2,346	100.00
Total votes		2,346	100.00

18th District general election
Party	Candidate	Votes	%
Republican	Tyler Paul Smith	18,168	75.17
Democratic	Pat Rhudy	6,002	24.83
Total votes		24,170	100.00
Republican hold			

=== District 19 ===
Republican primary
Party	Candidate	Votes	%
Republican	Joseph Gullett (incumbent)	7,157	100.00
Total votes		7,157	100.00

Democratic primary
Party	Candidate	Votes	%
Democratic	Alison Feliciano	4,866	100.00
Total votes		4,866	100.00

19th District general election
Party	Candidate	Votes	%
Republican	Joseph Gullett (incumbent)	19,414	61.54
Democratic	Alison Feliciano	12,132	38.46
Total votes		31,546	100.00
Republican hold			

=== District 20 ===
Republican primary
Party	Candidate	Votes	%
Republican	Charlice Byrd	3,948	49.25
Republican	Katrina Singletary	1,302	16.24
Republican	Rick Ballew	1,220	15.22
Republican	Jessica L. Long	789	9.84
Republican	Jordan Ridley	757	9.44
Total votes		8,016	100.00

Republican primary runoff
Party	Candidate	Votes	%
Republican	Charlice Byrd	2,002	63.47
Republican	Katrina Singletary	1,152	36.53
Total votes		3,154	100.00

Democratic primary
Party	Candidate	Votes	%
Democratic	Ginny Lennox	4,138	100.00
Total votes		4,138	100.00

20th District general election
Party	Candidate	Votes	%
Republican	Charlice Byrd	22,262	66.10
Democratic	Ginny Lennox	11,416	33.90
Total votes		33,678	100.00
Republican hold			

=== District 21 ===
Republican primary
Party	Candidate	Votes	%
Republican	Bill Fincher	4,475	48.69
Republican	Brad Thomas	3,407	37.07
Republican	Rajpal "Raj" Sagoo	1,309	14.24
Total votes		9,191	100.00

Republican primary runoff
Party	Candidate	Votes	%
Republican	Brad Thomas	2,302	55.81
Republican	Bill Fincher	1,823	44.19
Total votes		4,125	100.00

Democratic primary
Party	Candidate	Votes	%
Democratic	William D. Hughes	3,320	100.00
Total votes		3,320	100.00

21st District general election
Party	Candidate	Votes	%
Republican	Brad Thomas	25,787	72.70
Democratic	William D. Hughes	9,681	27.30
Total votes		35,468	100.00
Republican hold			

=== District 22 ===
Republican primary
Party	Candidate	Votes	%
Republican	Wes Cantrell (incumbent)	11,042	100.00
Total votes		11,042	100.00

Democratic primary
Party	Candidate	Votes	%
Democratic	Charles Ravenscraft	2,204	53.26
Democratic	Bobbi L. Simpson	1,934	46.74
Total votes		4,138	100.00

22nd District general election
Party	Candidate	Votes	%
Republican	Wes Cantrell (incumbent)	31,898	74.42
Democratic	Charles Ravenscraft	10,962	25.58
Total votes		42,680	100.00
Republican hold			

=== District 23 ===
Republican primary
Party	Candidate	Votes	%
Republican	Mandi L. Ballinger (incumbent)	8,465	100.00
Total votes		8,465	100.00

23rd District general election
Party	Candidate	Votes	%
Republican	Mandi L. Ballinger (incumbent)	28,118	100.00
Total votes		28,118	100.00
Republican hold			

=== District 24 ===
Republican primary
Party	Candidate	Votes	%
Republican	Sheri Smallwood Gilligan (incumbent)	9,015	100.00
Total votes		9,015	100.00

Democratic primary
Party	Candidate	Votes	%
Democratic	Natalie Bucsko	3,675	100.00
Total votes		3,675	100.00

24th District general election
Party	Candidate	Votes	%
Republican	Sheri Smallwood Gilligan (incumbent)	27,912	73.36
Democratic	Natalie Bucsko	10,136	26.64
Total votes		38,048	100.00
Republican hold			

=== District 25 ===
Republican primary
Party	Candidate	Votes	%
Republican	Todd Jones (incumbent)	7,289	100.00
Total votes		7,289	100.00

Democratic primary
Party	Candidate	Votes	%
Democratic	Christa Olenczak	5,298	100.00
Total votes		5,298	100.00

25th District general election
Party	Candidate	Votes	%
Republican	Todd Jones (incumbent)	23,733	61.77
Democratic	Christa Olenczak	14,689	38.23
Total votes		38,422	100.00
Republican hold			

=== District 26 ===
Republican primary
Party	Candidate	Votes	%
Republican	Lauren W. McDonald, III	10,020	100.00
Total votes		10,020	100.00

Democratic primary
Party	Candidate	Votes	%
Democratic	Jason Boskey	3,087	100.00
Total votes		3,087	100.00

26th District general election
Party	Candidate	Votes	%
Republican	Lauren W. McDonald, III	29,178	77.24
Democratic	Jason Boskey	8,600	22.76
Total votes		37,778	100.00
Republican hold			

=== District 27 ===
Republican primary
Party	Candidate	Votes	%
Republican	Lee Hawkins (incumbent)	9,602	100.00
Total votes		9,602	100.00

27th District general election
Party	Candidate	Votes	%
Republican	Lee Hawkins (incumbent)	24,715	100.00
Total votes		24,715	100.00
Republican hold			

=== District 28 ===
Republican primary
Party	Candidate	Votes	%
Republican	Chris Erwin (incumbent)	9,540	100.00
Total votes		9,540	100.00

28th District general election
Party	Candidate	Votes	%
Republican	Chris Erwin (incumbent)	22,655	100.00
Total votes		22,655	100.00
Republican hold			

=== District 29 ===
Republican primary
Party	Candidate	Votes	%
Republican	Matt Dubnik (incumbent)	5,555	100.00
Total votes		5,555	100.00

Democratic primary
Party	Candidate	Votes	%
Democratic	Pat Calmes	2,481	100.00
Total votes		2,481	100.00

29th District general election
Party	Candidate	Votes	%
Republican	Matt Dubnik (incumbent)	12,877	64.93
Democratic	Pat Calmes	6,954	35.07
Total votes		19,831	100.00
Republican hold			

=== District 30 ===
Republican primary
Party	Candidate	Votes	%
Republican	Emory Dunahoo, Jr. (incumbent)	7,425	100.00
Total votes		7,425	100.00

Democratic primary
Party	Candidate	Votes	%
Democratic	Leigh Miller	2,413	100.00
Total votes		2,413	100.00

30th District general election
Party	Candidate	Votes	%
Republican	Emory Dunahoo, Jr. (incumbent)	18,717	70.05
Democratic	Leigh Miller	8,003	29.95
Total votes		26,720	100.00
Republican hold			

=== District 31 ===
Republican primary
Party	Candidate	Votes	%
Republican	Tommy Benton (incumbent)	10,424	100.00
Total votes		10,424	100.00

Democratic primary
Party	Candidate	Votes	%
Democratic	Pete Fuller	2,158	100.00
Total votes		2,158	100.00

31st District general election
Party	Candidate	Votes	%
Republican	Tommy Benton (incumbent)	26,632	80.32
Democratic	Pete Fuller	6,524	19.68
Total votes		33,156	100.00
Republican hold			

=== District 32 ===
Republican primary
Party	Candidate	Votes	%
Republican	Alan Powell (incumbent)	11,406	100.00
Total votes		11,406	100.00

Democratic primary
Party	Candidate	Votes	%
Democratic	Alisha Allen	1,727	100.00
Total votes		1,727	100.00

32nd District general election
Party	Candidate	Votes	%
Republican	Alan Powell (incumbent)	22,259	84.19
Democratic	Alisha Allen	4,180	15.81
Total votes		26,439	100.00
Republican hold			

=== District 33 ===
Republican primary
Party	Candidate	Votes	%
Republican	Tripp Strickland	4,480	47.24
Republican	Rob Leverett	3,601	37.97
Republican	Bruce Azevedo	1,402	14.78
Total votes		9,483	100.00

Republican primary runoff
Party	Candidate	Votes	%
Republican	Rob Leverett	3,568	52.15
Republican	Tripp Strickland	3,274	47.85
Total votes		6,842	100.00

Democratic primary
Party	Candidate	Votes	%
Democratic	Kerry Dornell Hamm	3,089	100.00
Total votes		3,089	100.00

33rd District general election
Party	Candidate	Votes	%
Republican	Rob Leverett	19,768	73.91
Democratic	Kerry Dornell Hamm	6,979	26.09
Total votes		26,747	100.00
Republican hold			

=== District 34 ===
Republican primary
Party	Candidate	Votes	%
Republican	Bert Reeves (incumbent)	6,046	100.00
Total votes		6,046	100.00

Democratic primary
Party	Candidate	Votes	%
Democratic	Priscilla G. Smith	5,600	100.00
Total votes		5,600	100.00

34th District general election
Party	Candidate	Votes	%
Republican	Bert Reeves (incumbent)	16,888	56.13
Democratic	Priscilla G. Smith	13,199	43.87
Total votes		30,087	100.00
Republican hold			

=== District 35 ===
Republican primary
Party	Candidate	Votes	%
Republican	Ed Setzler (incumbent)	4,977	100.00
Total votes		4,977	100.00

Democratic primary
Party	Candidate	Votes	%
Democratic	Lisa Campbell	2,751	40.47
Democratic	Kyle Rinaudo	2,033	29.91
Democratic	Elizabeth Webster	2,014	29.63
Total votes		6,798	100.00

Democratic primary runoff
Party	Candidate	Votes	%
Democratic	Kyle Rinaudo	1,302	53.85
Democratic	Lisa Campbell	1,116	46.15
Total votes		2,418	100.00

35th District general election
Party	Candidate	Votes	%
Republican	Ed Setzler (incumbent)	15,189	50.47
Democratic	Kyle Rinaudo	14,909	49.53
Total votes		30,098	100.00
Republican hold			

=== District 36 ===
Republican primary
Party	Candidate	Votes	%
Republican	Ginny Ehrhart (incumbent)	8,385	100.00
Total votes		8,385	100.00

Democratic primary
Party	Candidate	Votes	%
Democratic	James Francis Ryner	5,809	100.00
Total votes		5,809	100.00

36th District general election
Party	Candidate	Votes	%
Republican	Ginny Ehrhart (incumbent)	24,536	64.83
Democratic	James Francis Ryner	13,313	35.17
Total votes		37,849	100.00
Republican hold			

=== District 37 ===
Republican primary
Party	Candidate	Votes	%
Republican	Rose Wing	5,176	100.00
Total votes		5,176	100.00

Democratic primary
Party	Candidate	Votes	%
Democratic	Mary Frances Williams (incumbent)	6,738	100.00
Total votes		6,738	100.00

37th District general election
Party	Candidate	Votes	%
Democratic	Mary Frances Williams (incumbent)	15,946	53.96
Republican	Rose Wing	13,603	46.04
Total votes		29,549	100.00
Democratic hold			

=== District 38 ===
Democratic primary
Party	Candidate	Votes	%
Democratic	David Wilkerson (incumbent)	9,857	100.00
Total votes		9,857	100.00

38th District general election
Party	Candidate	Votes	%
Democratic	David Wilkerson (incumbent)	25,015	100.00
Total votes		25,015	100.00
Democratic hold			

=== District 39 ===
Republican primary
Party	Candidate	Votes	%
Republican	Jim Hickey	1,272	100.00
Total votes		1,272	100.00

Democratic primary
Party	Candidate	Votes	%
Democratic	Erica Thomas (incumbent)	6,901	65.18
Democratic	Terry Alexis Cummings	3,687	34.82
Total votes		10,588	100.00

39th District general election
Party	Candidate	Votes	%
Democratic	Erica Thomas (incumbent)	20,613	82.37
Republican	Jim Hickey	4,411	17.63
Total votes		25,024	100.00
Democratic hold			

=== District 40 ===
Republican primary
Party	Candidate	Votes	%
Republican	Taryn Chilivis Bowman	4,815	100.00
Total votes		4,815	100.00

Democratic primary
Party	Candidate	Votes	%
Democratic	Erick Eugene Allen (incumbent)	9,072	100.00
Total votes		9,072	100.00

40th District general election
Party	Candidate	Votes	%
Democratic	Erick Eugene Allen (incumbent)	20,716	58.37
Republican	Taryn Chilivis Bowman	14,773	41.63
Total votes		35,489	100.00
Democratic hold			

=== District 41 ===
Republican primary
Party	Candidate	Votes	%
Republican	Stephen M. George, Jr.	2,089	100.00
Total votes		2,089	100.00

Democratic primary
Party	Candidate	Votes	%
Democratic	Michael Smith (incumbent)	6,222	100.00
Total votes		6,222	100.00

41st District general election
Party	Candidate	Votes	%
Democratic	Michael Smith (incumbent)	14,960	71.79
Republican	Stephen M. George, Jr.	5,878	28.21
Total votes		20,838	100.00
Democratic hold			

=== District 42 ===
Democratic primary
Party	Candidate	Votes	%
Democratic	Teri Anulewicz (incumbent)	3,520	58.81
Democratic	Asher Nuckolls	2,465	41.19
Total votes		5,985	100.00

42nd District general election
Party	Candidate	Votes	%
Democratic	Teri Anulewicz (incumbent)	17,237	100.00
Total votes		17,237	100.00
Democratic hold			

=== District 43 ===
Republican primary
Party	Candidate	Votes	%
Republican	Sharon Cooper (incumbent)	6,095	100.00
Total votes		6,095	100.00

Democratic primary
Party	Candidate	Votes	%
Democratic	Luisa Wakeman	6,767	100.00
Total votes		6,767	100.00

43rd District general election
Party	Candidate	Votes	%
Republican	Sharon Cooper (incumbent)	15,928	50.76
Democratic	Luisa Wakeman	15,452	49.24
Total votes		31,380	100.00
Republican hold			

=== District 44 ===
Republican primary
Party	Candidate	Votes	%
Republican	Don L. Parsons (incumbent)	6,375	100.00
Total votes		6,375	100.00

Democratic primary
Party	Candidate	Votes	%
Democratic	Connie DiCicco	6,492	100.00
Total votes		6,492	100.00

44th District general election
Party	Candidate	Votes	%
Republican	Don L. Parsons (incumbent)	16,809	51.83
Democratic	Connie DiCicco	15,623	48.17
Total votes		32,432	100.00
Republican hold			

=== District 45 ===
Republican primary
Party	Candidate	Votes	%
Republican	Matt Dollar (incumbent)	7,593	100.00
Total votes		7,593	100.00

Democratic primary
Party	Candidate	Votes	%
Democratic	Sara Tindall Ghazal	6,872	100.00
Total votes		6,872	100.00

45th District general election
Party	Candidate	Votes	%
Republican	Matt Dollar (incumbent)	19,549	54.98
Democratic	Sara Tindall Ghazal	16,006	45.02
Total votes		35,555	100.00
Republican hold			

=== District 46 ===
Republican primary
Party	Candidate	Votes	%
Republican	John Carson (incumbent)	8,011	100.00
Total votes		8,011	100.00

Democratic primary
Party	Candidate	Votes	%
Democratic	Caroline L. Holko	3,437	54.84
Democratic	Shirley Ritchie	2,830	45.16
Total votes		6,267	100.00

46th District general election
Party	Candidate	Votes	%
Republican	John Carson (incumbent)	21,712	61.46
Democratic	Caroline L. Holko	13,615	38.54
Total votes		35,327	100.00
Republican hold			

=== District 47 ===
Republican primary
Party	Candidate	Votes	%
Republican	Jan Jones (incumbent)	5,227	100.00
Total votes		5,227	100.00

Democratic primary
Party	Candidate	Votes	%
Democratic	Anthia Owens Carter	5,276	100.00
Total votes		6,267	100.00

47th District general election
Party	Candidate	Votes	%
Republican	Jan Jones (incumbent)	21,039	60.79
Democratic	Anthia Owens Carter	13,570	39.21
Total votes		34,609	100.00
Republican hold			

=== District 48 ===
Republican primary
Party	Candidate	Votes	%
Republican	Betty Price	3,641	100.00
Total votes		3,641	100.00

Democratic primary
Party	Candidate	Votes	%
Democratic	Mary Robichaux (incumbent)	5,443	100.00
Total votes		5,443	100.00

48th District general election
Party	Candidate	Votes	%
Democratic	Mary Robichaux (incumbent)	14,635	52.30
Republican	Betty Price	13,349	47.70
Total votes		27,984	100.00
Democratic hold			

=== District 49 ===
Republican primary
Party	Candidate	Votes	%
Republican	Charles E. "Chuck" Martin (incumbent)	4,422	100.00
Total votes		4,422	100.00

Democratic primary
Party	Candidate	Votes	%
Democratic	Jason T. Hayes	3,215	54.04
Democratic	Ken Lawler	2,734	45.96
Total votes		5,949	100.00

49th District general election
Party	Candidate	Votes	%
Republican	Charles E. "Chuck" Martin (incumbent)	16,974	52.81
Democratic	Jason T. Hayes	15,166	47.19
Total votes		32,140	100.00
Republican hold			

=== District 50 ===
Republican primary
Party	Candidate	Votes	%
Republican	Jay Lin	3,206	100.00
Total votes		3,206	100.00

Democratic primary
Party	Candidate	Votes	%
Democratic	Angelika Kausche (incumbent)	5,594	100.00
Total votes		5,594	100.00

50th District general election
Party	Candidate	Votes	%
Democratic	Angelika Kausche (incumbent)	15,111	52.81
Republican	Jay Lin	13,504	47.19
Total votes		28,615	100.00
Democratic hold			

=== District 51 ===
Republican primary
Party	Candidate	Votes	%
Republican	Alex B. Kaufman	3,425	100.00
Total votes		3,425	100.00

Democratic primary
Party	Candidate	Votes	%
Democratic	Josh McLaurin (incumbent)	6,258	100.00
Total votes		6,258	100.00

51st District general election
Party	Candidate	Votes	%
Democratic	Josh McLaurin (incumbent)	16,398	55.26
Republican	Alex B. Kaufman	13,274	44.74
Total votes		29,672	100.00
Democratic hold			

=== District 52 ===
Republican primary
Party	Candidate	Votes	%
Republican	Deborah Silcox (incumbent)	4,071	100.00
Total votes		4,071	100.00

Democratic primary
Party	Candidate	Votes	%
Democratic	Shea Roberts	7,382	100.00
Total votes		7,382	100.00

52nd District general election
Party	Candidate	Votes	%
Democratic	Shea Roberts	17,069	50.56
Republican	Deborah Silcox (incumbent)	16,692	49.44
Total votes		33,761	100.00
Democratic gain from Republican			

=== District 53 ===
Democratic primary
Party	Candidate	Votes	%
Democratic	Sheila Jones (incumbent)	9,918	100.00
Total votes		9,918	100.00

53rd District general election
Party	Candidate	Votes	%
Democratic	Sheila Jones (incumbent)	24,615	100.00
Total votes		24,615	100.00
Democratic hold			

=== District 54 ===
Republican primary
Party	Candidate	Votes	%
Republican	Lyndsey Rudder	3,011	100.00
Total votes		3,011	100.00

Democratic primary
Party	Candidate	Votes	%
Democratic	Betsy Holland (incumbent)	8,618	100.00
Total votes		8,618	100.00

54th District general election
Party	Candidate	Votes	%
Democratic	Betsy Holland (incumbent)	21,420	57.98
Republican	Lyndsey Rudder	15,521	42.02
Total votes		36,941	100.00
Democratic hold			

=== District 55 ===
Democratic primary
Party	Candidate	Votes	%
Democratic	Marie Metze (incumbent)	8,219	60.84
Democratic	Fred Quinn Jr.	5,291	39.16
Total votes		13,510	100.00

55th District general election
Party	Candidate	Votes	%
Democratic	Marie Metze (incumbent)	27,041	100.00
Total votes		27,041	100.00
Democratic hold			

=== District 56 ===
Democratic primary
Party	Candidate	Votes	%
Democratic	Mesha Mainor	4,571	53.95
Democratic	Josh McNair	2,852	33.66
Democratic	Darryl J. Terry, II	1,049	12.38
Total votes		8,472	100.00

56th District general election
Party	Candidate	Votes	%
Democratic	Mesha Mainor	19,664	100.00
Total votes		19,664	100.00
Democratic hold			

=== District 57 ===
Democratic primary
Party	Candidate	Votes	%
Democratic	Stacey Evans	7,891	56.78
Democratic	Alex Wan	4,500	32.38
Democratic	Kyle Lamont	1,029	7.40
Democratic	Jenne Shepherd	477	3.43
Total votes		13,897	100.00

57th District general election
Party	Candidate	Votes	%
Democratic	Stacey Evans	29,595	100.00
Total votes		29,595	100.00
Democratic hold			

=== District 58 ===
Democratic primary
Party	Candidate	Votes	%
Democratic	Park Cannon (incumbent)	11,161	100.00
Total votes		11,161	100.00

58th District general election
Party	Candidate	Votes	%
Democratic	Park Cannon (incumbent)	28,021	100.00
Total votes		28,021	100.00
Democratic hold			

=== District 59 ===
Democratic primary
Party	Candidate	Votes	%
Democratic	David Dreyer (incumbent)	10,155	100.00
Total votes		10,155	100.00

59th District general election
Party	Candidate	Votes	%
Democratic	David Dreyer (incumbent)	24,657	100.00
Total votes		24,657	100.00
Democratic hold			

=== District 60 ===
Democratic primary
Party	Candidate	Votes	%
Democratic	Kim Schofield (incumbent)	7,977	100.00
Total votes		7,977	100.00

60th District general election
Party	Candidate	Votes	%
Democratic	Kim Schofield (incumbent)	19,272	100.00
Total votes		19,272	100.00
Democratic hold			

=== District 61 ===
Democratic primary
Party	Candidate	Votes	%
Democratic	Roger Bruce (incumbent)	10,911	100.00
Total votes		10,911	100.00

61st District general election
Party	Candidate	Votes	%
Democratic	Roger Bruce (incumbent)	24,095	100.00
Total votes		24,095	100.00
Democratic hold			

=== District 62 ===
Democratic primary
Party	Candidate	Votes	%
Democratic	William K. Boddie, Jr. (incumbent)	13,902	100.00
Total votes		13,902	100.00

62nd District general election
Party	Candidate	Votes	%
Democratic	William K. Boddie, Jr. (incumbent)	29,482	100.00
Total votes		29,482	100.00
Democratic hold			

=== District 63 ===
Republican primary
Party	Candidate	Votes	%
Republican	David Callahan	2,463	100.00
Total votes		2,463	100.00

Democratic primary
Party	Candidate	Votes	%
Democratic	Debra Bazemore (incumbent)	9,175	74.68
Democratic	Kenneth "Ken" Kincaid	3,110	25.32
Total votes		12,285	100.00

63rd District general election
Party	Candidate	Votes	%
Democratic	Debra Bazemore (incumbent)	23,191	78.78
Republican	David Callahan	6,247	21.22
Total votes		29,438	100.00
Democratic hold			

=== District 64 ===
Democratic primary
Party	Candidate	Votes	%
Democratic	Derrick L. Jackson (incumbent)	11,259	100.00
Total votes		11,259	100.00

64th District general election
Party	Candidate	Votes	%
Democratic	Derrick L. Jackson (incumbent)	26,962	100.00
Total votes		26,962	100.00
Democratic hold			

=== District 65 ===
Democratic primary
Party	Candidate	Votes	%
Democratic	Sharon Beasley-Teague (incumbent)	6,141	49.20
Democratic	Mandisha A. Thomas	4,562	36.55
Democratic	Amber Doss-Hunter	1,779	14.25
Total votes		12,482	100.00

Democratic primary runoff
Party	Candidate	Votes	%
Democratic	Mandisha A. Thomas	3,427	58.03
Democratic	Sharon Beasley-Teague (incumbent)	2,479	41.97
Total votes		5,906	100.00

65th District general election
Party	Candidate	Votes	%
Democratic	Mandisha A. Thomas	26,797	100.00
Total votes		26,797	100.00
Democratic hold			

=== District 66 ===
Republican primary
Party	Candidate	Votes	%
Republican	Jason C. Jones	3,252	100.00
Total votes		3,252	100.00

Democratic primary
Party	Candidate	Votes	%
Democratic	Kimberly Alexander (incumbent)	9,398	100.00
Total votes		9,398	100.00

66th District general election
Party	Candidate	Votes	%
Democratic	Kimberly Alexander (incumbent)	19,407	66.62
Republican	Jason C. Jones	9,726	33.38
Total votes		29,133	100.00
Democratic hold			

=== District 67 ===
Republican primary
Party	Candidate	Votes	%
Republican	Micah Gravley (incumbent)	5,981	100.00
Total votes		5,981	100.00

Democratic primary
Party	Candidate	Votes	%
Democratic	Angela Mayfield	5,230	100.00
Total votes		5,230	100.00

67th District general election
Party	Candidate	Votes	%
Republican	Micah Gravley (incumbent)	17,648	62.07
Democratic	Angela Mayfield	10,785	37.93
Total votes		28,433	100.00
Republican hold			

=== District 68 ===
Republican primary
Party	Candidate	Votes	%
Republican	J. Collins (incumbent)	7,364	100.00
Total votes		7,364	100.00

68th District general election
Party	Candidate	Votes	%
Republican	J. Collins (incumbent)	24,730	100.00
Total votes		24,730	100.00
Republican hold			

=== District 69 ===
Republican primary
Party	Candidate	Votes	%
Republican	Randy Nix (incumbent)	9,983	100.00
Total votes		9,983	100.00

Democratic primary
Party	Candidate	Votes	%
Democratic	Herbert Giles	2,268	100.00
Total votes		2,268	100.00

69th District general election
Party	Candidate	Votes	%
Republican	Randy Nix (incumbent)	20,856	79.78
Democratic	Herbert Giles	5,286	20.22
Total votes		26,142	100.00
Republican hold			

=== District 70 ===
Republican primary
Party	Candidate	Votes	%
Republican	Lynn Smith (incumbent)	6,589	100.00
Total votes		6,589	100.00

70th District general election
Party	Candidate	Votes	%
Republican	Lynn Smith (incumbent)	24,742	100.00
Total votes		24,742	100.00
Republican hold			

=== District 71 ===
Republican primary
Party	Candidate	Votes	%
Republican	Philip Singleton (incumbent)	5,800	59.70
Republican	Marcy Westmoreland Sakrison	3,916	40.30
Total votes		9,716	100.00

Democratic primary
Party	Candidate	Votes	%
Democratic	Jill Prouty	3,803	100.00
Total votes		3,803	100.00

71st District general election
Party	Candidate	Votes	%
Republican	Philip Singleton (incumbent)	25,530	72.75
Democratic	Jill Prouty	9,564	27.25
Total votes		35,094	100.00
Republican hold			

=== District 72 ===
Republican primary
Party	Candidate	Votes	%
Republican	Josh Bonner (incumbent)	9,358	100.00
Total votes		9,358	100.00

Democratic primary
Party	Candidate	Votes	%
Democratic	Fred Rovner	3,895	100.00
Total votes		3,895	100.00

72nd District general election
Party	Candidate	Votes	%
Republican	Josh Bonner (incumbent)	26,977	73.21
Democratic	Fred Rovner	9,874	26.79
Total votes		36,851	100.00
Republican hold			

=== District 73 ===
Republican primary
Party	Candidate	Votes	%
Republican	Karen Mathiak (incumbent)	6,557	100.00
Total votes		6,557	100.00

Democratic primary
Party	Candidate	Votes	%
Democratic	William Harris	5,784	100.00
Total votes		5,784	100.00

73rd District general election
Party	Candidate	Votes	%
Republican	Karen Mathiak (incumbent)	16,263	55.97
Democratic	William Harris	12,796	44.03
Total votes		29,059	100.00
Republican hold			

=== District 74 ===
Democratic primary
Party	Candidate	Votes	%
Democratic	Yasmin Neal	4,696	55.99
Democratic	Angel Massey	3,691	44.01
Total votes		8,387	100.00

74th District general election
Party	Candidate	Votes	%
Democratic	Yasmin Neal	17,865	100.00
Total votes		17,865	100.00
Democratic hold			

=== District 75 ===
Democratic primary
Party	Candidate	Votes	%
Democratic	Mike Glanton (incumbent)	9,672	100.00
Total votes		9,672	100.00

75th District general election
Party	Candidate	Votes	%
Democratic	Mike Glanton (incumbent)	21,735	100.00
Total votes		21,735	100.00
Democratic hold			

=== District 76 ===
Democratic primary
Party	Candidate	Votes	%
Democratic	Sandra Givens Scott (incumbent)	12,107	100.00
Total votes		12,107	100.00

76th District general election
Party	Candidate	Votes	%
Democratic	Sandra Givens Scott (incumbent)	24,533	100.00
Total votes		24,533	100.00
Democratic hold			

=== District 77 ===
Democratic primary
Party	Candidate	Votes	%
Democratic	Rhonda Burnough (incumbent)	8,029	100.00
Total votes		8,029	100.00

77th District general election
Party	Candidate	Votes	%
Democratic	Rhonda Burnough (incumbent)	18,616	100.00
Total votes		18,616	100.00
Democratic hold			

=== District 78 ===
Democratic primary
Party	Candidate	Votes	%
Democratic	Demetrius Douglas (incumbent)	7,564	64.96
Democratic	Attania Jean-Funny	3,008	25.83
Democratic	Ron Walker	9.21	1,072
Total votes		11,644	100.00

78th District general election
Party	Candidate	Votes	%
Democratic	Demetrius Douglas (incumbent)	24,482	100.00
Total votes		24,482	100.00
Democratic hold			

=== District 79 ===
Republican primary
Party	Candidate	Votes	%
Republican	Andrea Johnson	3,631	100.00
Total votes		3,631	100.00

Democratic primary
Party	Candidate	Votes	%
Democratic	Michael S. Wilensky (incumbent)	7,198	100.00
Total votes		7,198	100.00

79th District general election
Party	Candidate	Votes	%
Democratic	Michael S. Wilensky (incumbent)	16,602	59.75
Republican	Andrea Johnson	11,185	40.25
Total votes		27,787	100.00
Democratic hold			

=== District 80 ===
Republican primary
Party	Candidate	Votes	%
Republican	Alan Cole	2,946	100.00
Total votes		2,946	100.00

Democratic primary
Party	Candidate	Votes	%
Democratic	Matthew Wilson (incumbent)	7,016	100.00
Total votes		7,016	100.00

80th District general election
Party	Candidate	Votes	%
Democratic	Matthew Wilson (incumbent)	17,347	58.76
Republican	Alan Cole	12,173	41.24
Total votes		29,520	100.00
Democratic hold			

=== District 81 ===
Democratic primary
Party	Candidate	Votes	%
Democratic	Scott Holcomb (incumbent)	6,105	100.00
Total votes		6,105	100.00

81st District general election
Party	Candidate	Votes	%
Democratic	Scott Holcomb (incumbent)	17,404	100.00
Total votes		17,404	100.00
Democratic hold			

=== District 82 ===
Democratic primary
Party	Candidate	Votes	%
Democratic	Mary Margaret Oliver (incumbent)	9,153	100.00
Total votes		9,153	100.00

82nd District general election
Party	Candidate	Votes	%
Democratic	Mary Margaret Oliver (incumbent)	21,436	100.00
Total votes		21,436	100.00
Democratic hold			

=== District 83 ===
Democratic primary
Party	Candidate	Votes	%
Democratic	Becky Evans (incumbent)	10,707	69.24
Democratic	Audrey Maloof	4,757	30.76
Total votes		15,464	100.00

83rd District general election
Party	Candidate	Votes	%
Democratic	Becky Evans (incumbent)	29,044	100.00
Total votes		29,044	100.00
Democratic hold			

=== District 84 ===
Democratic primary
Party	Candidate	Votes	%
Democratic	Renitta Shannon (incumbent)	11,043	69.28
Democratic	Harmel "Mel" Codi	4,896	30.72
Total votes		15,939	100.00

84th District general election
Party	Candidate	Votes	%
Democratic	Renitta Shannon (incumbent)	29,992	100.00
Total votes		29,992	100.00
Democratic hold			

=== District 85 ===
Democratic primary
Party	Candidate	Votes	%
Democratic	Karla Drenner (incumbent)	10,192	100.00
Total votes		10,192	100.00

85th District general election
Party	Candidate	Votes	%
Democratic	Karla Drenner (incumbent)	22,624	100.00
Total votes		22,624	100.00
Democratic hold			

=== District 86 ===
Democratic primary
Party	Candidate	Votes	%
Democratic	Michele Henson (incumbent)	4,642	41.18
Democratic	Zulma Lopez	3,355	29.76
Democratic	Ladena Bolton	2,105	18.67
Democratic	Joscelyn C. O'Neil	1,171	10.39
Total votes		11,273	100.00

Democratic primary runoff
Party	Candidate	Votes	%
Democratic	Zulma Lopez	3,082	54.88
Democratic	Michele Henson (incumbent)	2,534	45.12
Total votes		11,273	100.00

86th District general election
Party	Candidate	Votes	%
Democratic	Zulma Lopez	23,209	100.00
Total votes		23,209	100.00
Democratic hold			

=== District 87 ===
Democratic primary
Party	Candidate	Votes	%
Democratic	Viola Davis (incumbent)	11,684	100.00
Total votes		11,684	100.00

87th District general election
Party	Candidate	Votes	%
Democratic	Viola Davis (incumbent)	25,870	100.00
Total votes		25,870	100.00
Democratic hold			

=== District 88 ===
Democratic primary
Party	Candidate	Votes	%
Democratic	Billy Mitchell (incumbent)	9,933	100.00
Total votes		9,933	100.00

88th District general election
Party	Candidate	Votes	%
Democratic	Billy Mitchell (incumbent)	22,598	100.00
Total votes		22,598	100.00
Democratic hold			

=== District 89 ===
Democratic primary
Party	Candidate	Votes	%
Democratic	Bee Nguyen (incumbent)	15,393	83.33
Democratic	Marcia Ridley	3,080	16.67
Total votes		18,473	100.00

89th District general election
Party	Candidate	Votes	%
Democratic	Bee Nguyen (incumbent)	32,600	100.00
Total votes		32,600	100.00
Democratic hold			

=== District 90 ===
Democratic primary
Party	Candidate	Votes	%
Democratic	Pam Stephenson (incumbent)	8,596	59.85
Democratic	Stan Watson	3,740	26.04
Democratic	Greg Shealey	2,026	14.11
Total votes		14,362	100.00

90th District general election
Party	Candidate	Votes	%
Democratic	Pam Stephenson (incumbent)	27,001	100.00
Total votes		27,001	100.00
Democratic hold			

=== District 91 ===
Democratic primary
Party	Candidate	Votes	%
Democratic	Rhonda S. Taylor	9,760	100.00
Total votes		9,760	100.00

91st District general election
Party	Candidate	Votes	%
Democratic	Rhonda S. Taylor	27,293	100.00
Total votes		27,293	100.00
Democratic hold			

=== District 92 ===
Democratic primary
Party	Candidate	Votes	%
Democratic	Doreen Carter (incumbent)	9,159	100.00
Total votes		9,159	100.00

92nd District general election
Party	Candidate	Votes	%
Democratic	Doreen Carter (incumbent)	20,996	100.00
Total votes		20,996	100.00
Democratic hold			

=== District 93 ===
Republican primary
Party	Candidate	Votes	%
Republican	Hubert Owens, Jr.	1,702	100.00
Total votes		1,702	100.00

Democratic primary
Party	Candidate	Votes	%
Democratic	Dar'Shun Kendrick (incumbent)	10,783	79.05
Democratic	Alfred Reynolds	2,858	20.95
Total votes		13,641	100.00

93rd District general election
Party	Candidate	Votes	%
Democratic	Dar'Shun Kendrick (incumbent)	26,638	83.76
Republican	Hubert Owens, Jr.	5,164	16.24
Total votes		31,802	100.00
Democratic hold			

=== District 94 ===
Democratic primary
Party	Candidate	Votes	%
Democratic	Karen Bennett (incumbent)	11,582	100.00
Total votes		11,582	100.00

94th District general election
Party	Candidate	Votes	%
Democratic	Karen Bennett (incumbent)	25,712	100.00
Total votes		25,712	100.00
Democratic hold			

=== District 95 ===
Republican primary
Party	Candidate	Votes	%
Republican	Erica McCurdy	4,609	100.00
Total votes		4,609	100.00

Democratic primary
Party	Candidate	Votes	%
Democratic	Beth Moore (incumbent)	6,806	100.00
Total votes		6,806	100.00

95th District general election
Party	Candidate	Votes	%
Democratic	Beth Moore (incumbent)	16,530	55.93
Republican	Erica McCurdy	13,023	44.07
Total votes		29,553	100.00
Democratic hold			

=== District 96 ===
Democratic primary
Party	Candidate	Votes	%
Democratic	Pedro "Pete" Marin (incumbent)	4,514	100.00
Total votes		4,514	100.00

96th District general election
Party	Candidate	Votes	%
Democratic	Pedro "Pete" Marin (incumbent)	15,015	100.00
Total votes		15,015	100.00
Democratic hold			

=== District 97 ===
Republican primary
Party	Candidate	Votes	%
Republican	Bonnie Rich (incumbent)	5,652	100.00
Total votes		5,652	100.00

Democratic primary
Party	Candidate	Votes	%
Democratic	Mary Blackmon Campbell	6,387	100.00
Total votes		6,387	100.00

97th District general election
Party	Candidate	Votes	%
Republican	Bonnie Rich (incumbent)	16,929	52.17
Democratic	Mary Blackmon Campbell	15,520	47.83
Total votes		32,449	100.00
Republican hold			

=== District 98 ===
Republican primary
Party	Candidate	Votes	%
Republican	David Clark (incumbent)	5,830	100.00
Total votes		5,830	100.00

Democratic primary
Party	Candidate	Votes	%
Democratic	Taeho Cho	5,110	100.00
Total votes		5,110	100.00

98th District general election
Party	Candidate	Votes	%
Republican	David Clark (incumbent)	18,595	59.06
Democratic	Taeho Cho	12,888	40.94
Total votes		31,483	100.00
Republican hold			

=== District 99 ===
Democratic primary
Party	Candidate	Votes	%
Democratic	Marvin Lim	2,173	61.49
Democratic	Jorge Granados	1,361	38.51
Total votes		3,534	100.00

99th District general election
Party	Candidate	Votes	%
Democratic	Marvin Lim	9,943	100.00
Total votes		9,943	100.00
Democratic hold			

=== District 100 ===
Democratic primary
Party	Candidate	Votes	%
Democratic	Dewey L. McClain (incumbent)	4,564	100.00
Total votes		4,564	100.00

100th District general election
Party	Candidate	Votes	%
Democratic	Dewey L. McClain (incumbent)	14,498	100.00
Total votes		14,498	100.00
Democratic hold			

=== District 101 ===
Republican primary
Party	Candidate	Votes	%
Republican	Carol Field	3,484	100.00
Total votes		3,484	100.00

Democratic primary
Party	Candidate	Votes	%
Democratic	Sam Park (incumbent)	6,267	100.00
Total votes		6,267	100.00

101st District general election
Party	Candidate	Votes	%
Democratic	Sam Park (incumbent)	15,941	62.14
Republican	Carol Field	9,713	37.86
Total votes		25,654	100.00
Democratic hold			

=== District 102 ===
Republican primary
Party	Candidate	Votes	%
Republican	Soo Hong	3,852	100.00
Total votes		3,852	100.00

Democratic primary
Party	Candidate	Votes	%
Democratic	Gregg Kennard (incumbent)	5,825	100.00
Total votes		5,825	100.00

102nd District general election
Party	Candidate	Votes	%
Democratic	Gregg Kennard (incumbent)	14,134	51.50
Republican	Soo Hong	13,313	48.50
Total votes		27,447	100.00
Democratic hold			

=== District 103 ===
Republican primary
Party	Candidate	Votes	%
Republican	Timothy Barr (incumbent)	5,699	62.65
Republican	Derrick McCollum	2,897	31.85
Republican	Donald Schmidt	501	5.51
Total votes		9,097	100.00

Democratic primary
Party	Candidate	Votes	%
Democratic	Clifton Marshall	4,263	100.00
Total votes		4,263	100.00

103rd District general election
Party	Candidate	Votes	%
Republican	Timothy Barr (incumbent)	24,204	67.50
Democratic	Clifton Marshall	11,652	32.50
Total votes		35,856	100.00
Republican hold			

=== District 104 ===
Republican primary
Party	Candidate	Votes	%
Republican	Chuck Efstration (incumbent)	5,245	100.00
Total votes		5,245	100.00

Democratic primary
Party	Candidate	Votes	%
Democratic	Nakita Hemingway	4,723	65.15
Democratic	Andrea Stephenson	2,526	34.85
Total votes		7,249	100.00

104th District general election
Party	Candidate	Votes	%
Republican	Chuck Efstration (incumbent)	17,326	51.15
Democratic	Nakita Hemingway	16,547	48.85
Total votes		33,873	100.00
Republican hold			

=== District 105 ===
Republican primary
Party	Candidate	Votes	%
Republican	Eric Dierks	4,342	100.00
Total votes		4,342	100.00

Democratic primary
Party	Candidate	Votes	%
Democratic	Donna McLeod (incumbent)	8,735	100.00
Total votes		8,735	100.00

105th District general election
Party	Candidate	Votes	%
Democratic	Donna McLeod (incumbent)	19,869	62.26
Republican	Eric Dierks	12,043	37.74
Total votes		31,912	100.00
Democratic hold			

=== District 106 ===
Republican primary
Party	Candidate	Votes	%
Republican	Brett Harrell (incumbent)	4,745	100.00
Total votes		4,745	100.00

Democratic primary
Party	Candidate	Votes	%
Democratic	Rebecca Mitchell	5,051	59.21
Democratic	Emily Leslie	3,479	40.79
Total votes		8,530	100.00

106th District general election
Party	Candidate	Votes	%
Democratic	Rebecca Mitchell	17,611	58.71
Republican	Brett Harrell (incumbent)	12,384	41.29
Total votes		29,995	100.00
Democratic gain from Republican			

=== District 107 ===
Republican primary
Party	Candidate	Votes	%
Republican	Michael McConnell	3,728	100.00
Total votes		3,728	100.00

Democratic primary
Party	Candidate	Votes	%
Democratic	Shelly Hutchinson (incumbent)	6,962	100.00
Total votes		6,962	100.00

107th District general election
Party	Candidate	Votes	%
Democratic	Shelly Hutchinson (incumbent)	16,730	61.41
Republican	Michael McConnell	10,514	38.59
Total votes		27,244	100.00
Democratic hold			

=== District 108 ===
Republican primary
Party	Candidate	Votes	%
Republican	Johnny Crist	4,453	100.00
Total votes		4,453	100.00

Democratic primary
Party	Candidate	Votes	%
Democratic	Jasmine Clark (incumbent)	6,252	100.00
Total votes		6,252	100.00

108th District general election
Party	Candidate	Votes	%
Democratic	Jasmine Clark (incumbent)	14,602	54.82
Republican	Johnny Crist	12,034	45.18
Total votes		26,636	100.00
Democratic hold			

=== District 109 ===
Republican primary
Party	Candidate	Votes	%
Republican	Dale Rutledge (incumbent)	6,109	100.00
Total votes		6,109	100.00

Democratic primary
Party	Candidate	Votes	%
Democratic	Regina Lewis-Ward	8,566	100.00
Total votes		8,566	100.00

109th District general election
Party	Candidate	Votes	%
Democratic	Regina Lewis-Ward	17,009	51.80
Republican	Dale Rutledge (incumbent)	15,825	48.20
Total votes		32,834	100.00
Democratic gain from Republican			

=== District 110 ===
Republican primary
Party	Candidate	Votes	%
Republican	Clint Crowe	5,812	100.00
Total votes		5,812	100.00

Democratic primary
Party	Candidate	Votes	%
Democratic	Ebony Carter	5,604	100.00
Total votes		5,604	100.00

110th District general election
Party	Candidate	Votes	%
Republican	Clint Crowe	15,729	55.80
Democratic	Ebony Carter	12,459	44.20
Total votes		28,188	100.00
Republican hold			

=== District 111 ===
Democratic primary
Party	Candidate	Votes	%
Democratic	El-Mahdi Holly (incumbent)	5,619	50.91
Democratic	Tarji Leonard Dunn	5,419	49.09
Total votes		11,038	100.00

111th District general election
Party	Candidate	Votes	%
Democratic	El-Mahdi Holly (incumbent)	27,997	100.00
Total votes		27,997	100.00
Democratic hold			

=== District 112 ===
Republican primary
Party	Candidate	Votes	%
Republican	Dave Belton (incumbent)	10,622	100.00
Total votes		10,622	100.00

112th District general election
Party	Candidate	Votes	%
Republican	Dave Belton (incumbent)	26,093	100.00
Total votes		26,093	100.00
Republican hold			

=== District 113 ===
Democratic primary
Party	Candidate	Votes	%
Democratic	Sharon Henderson	5,696	50.73
Democratic	Pam Dickerson (incumbent)	5,532	49.27
Total votes		11,228	100.00

113th District general election
Party	Candidate	Votes	%
Democratic	Sharon Henderson	23,743	100.00
Total votes		23,743	100.00
Democratic hold			

=== District 114 ===
Republican primary
Party	Candidate	Votes	%
Republican	Tom Kirby (incumbent)	7,762	100.00
Total votes		7,762	100.00

114th District general election
Party	Candidate	Votes	%
Republican	Tom Kirby (incumbent)	27,331	100.00
Total votes		27,331	100.00
Republican hold			

=== District 115 ===
Republican primary
Party	Candidate	Votes	%
Republican	Bruce Williamson (incumbent)	9,766	100.00
Total votes		9,766	100.00

Democratic primary
Party	Candidate	Votes	%
Democratic	Debbie Reed	2,787	100.00
Total votes		2,787	100.00

115th District general election
Party	Candidate	Votes	%
Republican	Bruce Williamson (incumbent)	23,812	77.55
Democratic	Debbie Reed	6,895	22.45
Total votes		30,707	100.00
Republican hold			

=== District 116 ===
Republican primary
Party	Candidate	Votes	%
Republican	Terry England (incumbent)	7,111	100.00
Total votes		7,111	100.00

116th District general election
Party	Candidate	Votes	%
Republican	Terry England (incumbent)	24,376	100.00
Total votes		24,376	100.00
Republican hold			

=== District 117 ===
Republican primary
Party	Candidate	Votes	%
Republican	Houston Gaines (incumbent)	6,382	100.00
Total votes		6,382	100.00

Democratic primary
Party	Candidate	Votes	%
Democratic	"Mokah" Jasmine Johnson	6,493	100.00
Total votes		6,493	100.00

117th District general election
Party	Candidate	Votes	%
Republican	Houston Gaines (incumbent)	16,863	56.58
Democratic	"Mokah" Jasmine Johnson	12,940	43.42
Total votes		29,083	100.00
Republican hold			

=== District 118 ===
Democratic primary
Party	Candidate	Votes	%
Democratic	Spencer Frye (incumbent)	7,474	100.00
Total votes		7,474	100.00

118th District general election
Party	Candidate	Votes	%
Democratic	Spencer Frye (incumbent)	18,807	100.00
Total votes		18,807	100.00
Democratic hold			

=== District 119 ===
Republican primary
Party	Candidate	Votes	%
Republican	Marcus A Wiedower (incumbent)	7,570	100.00
Total votes		7,570	100.00

Democratic primary
Party	Candidate	Votes	%
Democratic	Jonathan Wallace	6,321	100.00
Total votes		6,321	100.00

119th District general election
Party	Candidate	Votes	%
Republican	Marcus A Wiedower (incumbent)	16,828	54.85
Democratic	Jonathan Wallace	13,852	45.15
Total votes		30,680	100.00
Republican hold			

=== District 120 ===
Republican primary
Party	Candidate	Votes	%
Republican	Trey Rhodes (incumbent)	9,874	100.00
Total votes		9,874	100.00

120th District general election
Party	Candidate	Votes	%
Republican	Trey Rhodes (incumbent)	25,247	100.00
Total votes		25,247	100.00
Republican hold			

=== District 121 ===
Republican primary
Party	Candidate	Votes	%
Republican	Barry Fleming (incumbent)	6,711	100.00
Total votes		6,711	100.00

121st District general election
Party	Candidate	Votes	%
Republican	Barry Fleming (incumbent)	26,291	100.00
Total votes		26,291	100.00
Republican hold			

=== District 122 ===
Republican primary
Party	Candidate	Votes	%
Republican	Jodi Lott (incumbent)	9,021	100.00
Total votes		9,021	100.00

Democratic primary
Party	Candidate	Votes	%
Democratic	Doris O. Crutchfield	4,216	100.00
Total votes		4,216	100.00

122nd District general election
Party	Candidate	Votes	%
Republican	Jodi Lott (incumbent)	26,081	69.91
Democratic	Doris O. Crutchfield	11,224	30.09
Total votes		37,305	100.00
Republican hold			

=== District 123 ===
Republican primary
Party	Candidate	Votes	%
Republican	Mark Newton (incumbent)	7,625	100.00
Total votes		7,625	100.00

123rd District general election
Party	Candidate	Votes	%
Republican	Mark Newton (incumbent)	23,452	100.00
Total votes		23,452	100.00
Republican hold			

=== District 124 ===
Democratic primary
Party	Candidate	Votes	%
Democratic	Henry "Wayne" Howard (incumbent)	5,871	100.00
Total votes		5,871	100.00

124th District general election
Party	Candidate	Votes	%
Democratic	Henry "Wayne" Howard (incumbent)	16,454	100.00
Total votes		16,454	100.00
Democratic hold			

=== District 125 ===
Democratic primary
Party	Candidate	Votes	%
Democratic	Sheila Clark Nelson (incumbent)	6,171	100.00
Total votes		6,171	100.00

125th District general election
Party	Candidate	Votes	%
Democratic	Sheila Clark Nelson (incumbent)	17,666	100.00
Total votes		17,666	100.00
Democratic hold			

=== District 126 ===
Democratic primary
Party	Candidate	Votes	%
Democratic	Gloria Frazier (incumbent)	10,196	100.00
Total votes		10,196	100.00

126th District general election
Party	Candidate	Votes	%
Democratic	Gloria Frazier (incumbent)	22,232	100.00
Total votes		22,232	100.00
Democratic hold			

=== District 127 ===
Democratic primary
Party	Candidate	Votes	%
Democratic	Brian L. Prince (incumbent)	8,199	100.00
Total votes		8,199	100.00

127th District general election
Party	Candidate	Votes	%
Democratic	Brian L. Prince (incumbent)	18,665	100.00
Total votes		18,665	100.00
Democratic hold			

=== District 128 ===
Democratic primary
Party	Candidate	Votes	%
Democratic	Mack Jackson (incumbent)	7,847	75.79
Democratic	Daniel "Danny" Thomas, Jr.	2,507	24.21
Total votes		10,354	100.00

128th District general election
Party	Candidate	Votes	%
Democratic	Mack Jackson (incumbent)	18,053	100.00
Total votes		18,053	100.00
Democratic hold			

=== District 129 ===
Republican primary
Party	Candidate	Votes	%
Republican	Susan Holmes (incumbent)	7,979	100.00
Total votes		7,979	100.00

Democratic primary
Party	Candidate	Votes	%
Democratic	Sharonda Bell	3,683	100.00
Total votes		3,683	100.00

129th District general election
Party	Candidate	Votes	%
Republican	Susan Holmes (incumbent)	18,966	69.61
Democratic	Sharonda Bell	7,152	26.25
Independent	Joe Reed	1,130	4.15
Total votes		27,248	100.00
Republican hold			

=== District 130 ===
Republican primary
Party	Candidate	Votes	%
Republican	David Knight (incumbent)	6,281	100.00
Total votes		6,281	100.00

Democratic primary
Party	Candidate	Votes	%
Democratic	Sheila Henley	4,898	100.00
Total votes		4,898	100.00

130th District general election
Party	Candidate	Votes	%
Republican	David Knight (incumbent)	16,023	58.43
Democratic	Sheila Henley	11,398	41.57
Total votes		27,421	100.00
Republican hold			

=== District 131 ===
Republican primary
Party	Candidate	Votes	%
Republican	Beth Camp	5,369	51.38
Republican	Kenny Coggins	5,080	48.62
Total votes		10,449	100.00

Democratic primary
Party	Candidate	Votes	%
Democratic	Chris Benton	3,187	100.00
Total votes		3,187	100.00

131st District general election
Party	Candidate	Votes	%
Republican	Beth Camp	20,246	74.81
Democratic	Chris Benton	6,816	25.19
Total votes		27,062	100.00
Republican hold			

=== District 132 ===
Republican primary
Party	Candidate	Votes	%
Republican	David Jenkins	3,437	74.44
Republican	Gene King	1,180	25.56
Total votes		4,617	100.00

Democratic primary
Party	Candidate	Votes	%
Democratic	Bob Trammell, Jr. (incumbent)	2,962	59.59
Democratic	Frederick Manley	2,009	40.41
Total votes		4,971	100.00

132nd District general election
Party	Candidate	Votes	%
Republican	David Jenkins	11,458	51.50
Democratic	Bob Trammell, Jr. (incumbent)	10,792	48.50
Total votes		22,250	100.00
Republican gain from Democratic			

=== District 133 ===
Republican primary
Party	Candidate	Votes	%
Republican	Vance Smith, Jr. (incumbent)	8,554	100.00
Total votes		8,554	100.00

133rd District general election
Party	Candidate	Votes	%
Republican	Vance Smith, Jr. (incumbent)	25,094	100.00
Total votes		25,094	100.00
Republican hold			

=== District 134 ===
Republican primary
Party	Candidate	Votes	%
Republican	Richard H. Smith (incumbent)	5,741	100.00
Total votes		5,741	100.00

Democratic primary
Party	Candidate	Votes	%
Democratic	Carl Sprayberry	2,968	62.99
Democratic	William Tauxe	1,744	37.01
Total votes		4,712	100.00

134th District general election
Party	Candidate	Votes	%
Republican	Richard H. Smith (incumbent)	17,591	64.15
Democratic	Carl Sprayberry	9,831	35.85
Total votes		27,422	100.00
Republican hold			

=== District 135 ===
Democratic primary
Party	Candidate	Votes	%
Democratic	Calvin Smyre (incumbent)	4,838	100.00
Total votes		4,838	100.00

135th District general election
Party	Candidate	Votes	%
Democratic	Calvin Smyre (incumbent)	12,407	100.00
Total votes		12,407	100.00
Democratic hold			

=== District 136 ===
Democratic primary
Party	Candidate	Votes	%
Democratic	Carolyn Hugley (incumbent)	8,768	100.00
Total votes		8,768	100.00

136th District general election
Party	Candidate	Votes	%
Democratic	Carolyn Hugley (incumbent)	19,509	100.00
Total votes		19,509	100.00
Democratic hold			

=== District 137 ===
Democratic primary
Party	Candidate	Votes	%
Democratic	Debbie G. Buckner (incumbent)	8,638	100.00
Total votes		8,638	100.00

137th District general election
Party	Candidate	Votes	%
Democratic	Debbie G. Buckner (incumbent)	22,039	100.00
Total votes		22,039	100.00
Democratic hold			

=== District 138 ===
Republican primary
Party	Candidate	Votes	%
Republican	Mike Cheokas (incumbent)	4,393	100.00
Total votes		4,393	100.00

Democratic primary
Party	Candidate	Votes	%
Democratic	Marc Arnett	4,276	100.00
Total votes		4,276	100.00

138th District general election
Party	Candidate	Votes	%
Republican	Mike Cheokas (incumbent)	9,542	53.85
Democratic	Marc Arnett	8,177	46.15
Total votes		17,719	100.00
Republican hold			

=== District 139 ===
Democratic primary
Party	Candidate	Votes	%
Democratic	Patty Bentley (incumbent)	5,274	100.00
Total votes		5,274	100.00

139th District general election
Party	Candidate	Votes	%
Democratic	Patty Bentley (incumbent)	13,658	100.00
Total votes		13,658	100.00
Democratic hold			

=== District 140 ===
Republican primary
Party	Candidate	Votes	%
Republican	Robert Dickey (incumbent)	5,678	100.00
Total votes		5,678	100.00

140th District general election
Party	Candidate	Votes	%
Republican	Robert Dickey (incumbent)	19,693	100.00
Total votes		19,693	100.00
Republican hold			

=== District 141 ===
Republican primary
Party	Candidate	Votes	%
Republican	Dale Washburn (incumbent)	8,293	100.00
Total votes		8,293	100.00

141st District general election
Party	Candidate	Votes	%
Republican	Dale Washburn (incumbent)	25,840	100.00
Total votes		25,840	100.00
Republican hold			

=== District 142 ===
Democratic primary
Party	Candidate	Votes	%
Democratic	Miriam Paris (incumbent)	8,188	100.00
Total votes		8,188	100.00

142nd District general election
Party	Candidate	Votes	%
Democratic	Miriam Paris (incumbent)	18,212	100.00
Total votes		18,212	100.00
Democratic hold			

=== District 143 ===
Democratic primary
Party	Candidate	Votes	%
Democratic	James Beverly (incumbent)	8,315	100.00
Total votes		8,315	100.00

143rd District general election
Party	Candidate	Votes	%
Democratic	James Beverly (incumbent)	17,679	100.00
Total votes		17,679	100.00
Democratic hold			

=== District 144 ===
Republican primary
Party	Candidate	Votes	%
Republican	Danny Mathis (incumbent)	6,233	100.00
Total votes		6,233	100.00

Democratic primary
Party	Candidate	Votes	%
Democratic	Mary Whipple-Lue	4,517	100.00
Total votes		4,517	100.00

144th District general election
Party	Candidate	Votes	%
Republican	Danny Mathis (incumbent)	18,560	69.08
Democratic	Mary Whipple-Lue	8,306	30.92
Total votes		26,866	100.00
Republican hold			

=== District 145 ===
Republican primary
Party	Candidate	Votes	%
Republican	Ricky "Rick" Williams (incumbent)	5,155	100.00
Total votes		5,155	100.00

Democratic primary
Party	Candidate	Votes	%
Democratic	Quentin T. Howell	3,942	73.41
Democratic	Nincoe Byrd	1,428	26.59
Total votes		5,370	100.00

145th District general election
Party	Candidate	Votes	%
Republican	Ricky "Rick" Williams (incumbent)	12,371	56.16
Democratic	Quentin T. Howell	9,659	43.84
Total votes		22,030	100.00
Republican hold			

=== District 146 ===
Republican primary
Party	Candidate	Votes	%
Republican	Shaw Blackmon (incumbent)	6,716	100.00
Total votes		6,716	100.00

146th District general election
Party	Candidate	Votes	%
Republican	Shaw Blackmon (incumbent)	25,746	100.00
Total votes		25,746	100.00
Republican hold			

=== District 147 ===
Republican primary
Party	Candidate	Votes	%
Republican	Heath Clark (incumbent)	3,853	88.74
Republican	Miranda Britt	489	11.26
Total votes		4,342	100.00

Democratic primary
Party	Candidate	Votes	%
Democratic	Stephen Baughier	4,109	100.00
Total votes		4,109	100.00

147th District general election
Party	Candidate	Votes	%
Republican	Heath Clark (incumbent)	11,794	52.26
Democratic	Stephen Baughier	10,773	47.74
Total votes		22,567	100.00
Republican hold			

=== District 148 ===
Republican primary
Party	Candidate	Votes	%
Republican	Noel Williams Jr. (incumbent)	7,615	100.00
Total votes		7,615	100.00

Democratic primary
Party	Candidate	Votes	%
Democratic	Regina Awung	2,142	100.00
Total votes		2,142	100.00

148th District general election
Party	Candidate	Votes	%
Republican	Noel Williams Jr. (incumbent)	15,443	70.95
Democratic	Regina Awung	6,322	29.05
Total votes		21,765	29.05
Republican hold			

=== District 149 ===
Republican primary
Party	Candidate	Votes	%
Republican	Robert Pruitt	3,847	50.96
Republican	Chris Steverson	3,702	49.04
Total votes		7,549	100.00

149th District general election
Party	Candidate	Votes	%
Republican	Robert Pruitt	13,972	100.00
Total votes		13,972	100.00
Republican hold			

=== District 150 ===
Republican primary
Party	Candidate	Votes	%
Republican	Matt Hatchett (incumbent)	6,194	100.00
Total votes		6,194	100.00

150th District general election
Party	Candidate	Votes	%
Republican	Matt Hatchett (incumbent)	20,139	100.00
Total votes		20,139	100.00
Republican hold			

=== District 151 ===
Republican primary
Party	Candidate	Votes	%
Republican	Gerald E. Greene (incumbent)	3,628	100.00
Total votes		3,628	100.00

Democratic primary
Party	Candidate	Votes	%
Democratic	Joyce Barlow	7,060	100.00
Total votes		7,060	100.00

151st District general election
Party	Candidate	Votes	%
Republican	Gerald E. Greene (incumbent)	12,011	51.78
Democratic	Joyce Barlow	11,185	48.22
Total votes		23,196	100.00
Republican hold			

=== District 152 ===
Republican primary
Party	Candidate	Votes	%
Republican	Bill Yearta (incumbent)	7,523	79.72
Republican	Dennis Roland	1,914	20.28
Total votes		9,437	100.00

152nd District general election
Party	Candidate	Votes	%
Republican	Bill Yearta (incumbent)	23,841	100.00
Total votes		23,841	100.00
Republican hold			

=== District 153 ===
Democratic primary
Party	Candidate	Votes	%
Democratic	Camia Whitaker Hopson (incumbent)	3,636	58.79
Democratic	Henry Mathis, Jr.	2,549	41.21
Total votes		6,185	100.00

153rd District general election
Party	Candidate	Votes	%
Democratic	Camia Whitaker Hopson (incumbent)	15,462	100.00
Total votes		15,462	100.00
Democratic hold			

=== District 154 ===
Democratic primary
Party	Candidate	Votes	%
Democratic	Winfred Dukes (incumbent)	7,209	100.00
Total votes		7,209	100.00

154th District general election
Party	Candidate	Votes	%
Democratic	Winfred Dukes (incumbent)	17,798	100.00
Total votes		17,798	100.00
Democratic hold			

=== District 155 ===
Republican primary
Party	Candidate	Votes	%
Republican	Clay Pirkle (incumbent)	7,731	100.00
Total votes		7,731	100.00

Democratic primary
Party	Candidate	Votes	%
Democratic	Lethia Jones Kittrell	2,733	100.00
Total votes		2,733	100.00

155th District general election
Party	Candidate	Votes	%
Republican	Clay Pirkle (incumbent)	16,132	72.19
Democratic	Lethia Jones Kittrell	6,214	27.81
Total votes		22,346	100.00
Republican hold			

=== District 156 ===
Republican primary
Party	Candidate	Votes	%
Republican	Greg Morris (incumbent)	8,880	100.00
Total votes		8,880	100.00

156th District general election
Party	Candidate	Votes	%
Republican	Greg Morris (incumbent)	19,096	100.00
Total votes		19,096	100.00
Republican hold			

=== District 157 ===
Republican primary
Party	Candidate	Votes	%
Republican	William "Bill" Werkheiser (incumbent)	6,985	100.00
Total votes		6,985	100.00

156th District general election
Party	Candidate	Votes	%
Republican	William "Bill" Werkheiser (incumbent)	16,199	100.00
Total votes		16,199	100.00
Republican hold			

=== District 158 ===
Republican primary
Party	Candidate	Votes	%
Republican	Butch Parrish (incumbent)	7,762	100.00
Total votes		7,762	100.00

Democratic primary
Party	Candidate	Votes	%
Democratic	Ann P.D. Gleason	3,257	100.00
Total votes		3,257	100.00

158th District general election
Party	Candidate	Votes	%
Republican	Butch Parrish (incumbent)	15,379	69.42
Democratic	Ann P.D. Gleason	6,773	30.58
Total votes		22,152	100.00
Republican hold			

=== District 159 ===
Republican primary
Party	Candidate	Votes	%
Republican	Jon G. Burns (incumbent)	7,022	100.00
Total votes		7,022	100.00

159th District general election
Party	Candidate	Votes	%
Republican	Jon G. Burns (incumbent)	21,976	100.00
Total votes		21,976	100.00
Republican hold			

=== District 160 ===
Republican primary
Party	Candidate	Votes	%
Republican	Jan Tankersley (incumbent)	7,010	100.00
Total votes		7,010	100.00

160th District general election
Party	Candidate	Votes	%
Republican	Jan Tankersley (incumbent)	19,105	100.00
Total votes		19,105	100.00
Republican hold			

=== District 161 ===
Republican primary
Party	Candidate	Votes	%
Republican	Bill Hitchens (incumbent)	6,876	100.00
Total votes		6,876	100.00

161st District general election
Party	Candidate	Votes	%
Republican	Bill Hitchens (incumbent)	27,840	100.00
Total votes		27,840	100.00
Republican hold			

=== District 162 ===
Democratic primary
Party	Candidate	Votes	%
Democratic	Carl Wayne Gilliard (incumbent)	6,595	100.00
Total votes		6,595	100.00

162nd District general election
Party	Candidate	Votes	%
Democratic	Carl Wayne Gilliard (incumbent)	17,344	100.00
Total votes		17,344	100.00
Democratic hold			

=== District 163 ===
Democratic primary
Party	Candidate	Votes	%
Democratic	Anne Allen Westbrook	2,943	36.53
Democratic	Derek J. Mallow	2,138	26.54
Democratic	Mac Sims	1,409	17.49
Democratic	Matthew J. Swanson	1,069	13.27
Democratic	Marc Smith	498	6.18
Total votes		8,057	100.00

Democratic primary runoff
Party	Candidate	Votes	%
Democratic	Derek J. Mallow	2,678	50.18
Democratic	Anne Allen Westbrook	2,659	49.82
Total votes		5,337	100.00

163rd District general election
Party	Candidate	Votes	%
Democratic	Derek J. Mallow	18,099	100.00
Total votes		18,099	100.00
Democratic hold			

=== District 164 ===
Republican primary
Party	Candidate	Votes	%
Republican	Ron Stephens (incumbent)	4,240	100.00
Total votes		4,240	100.00

Democratic primary
Party	Candidate	Votes	%
Democratic	Marcus Thompson	3,734	76.08
Democratic	Jeffery D. Rayno	1,174	23.92
Total votes		4,908	100.00

164th District general election
Party	Candidate	Votes	%
Republican	Ron Stephens (incumbent)	13,829	52.56
Democratic	Marcus Thompson	12,484	47.44
Total votes		26,313	100.00
Republican hold			

=== District 165 ===
Democratic primary
Party	Candidate	Votes	%
Democratic	Mickey Stephens (incumbent)	5,159	62.73
Democratic	Clinton Young	3,065	37.27
Total votes		8,224	100.00

165th District general election
Party	Candidate	Votes	%
Democratic	Mickey Stephens (incumbent)	19,955	100.00
Total votes		19,955	100.00
Democratic hold			

=== District 166 ===
Republican primary
Party	Candidate	Votes	%
Republican	Jesse Petrea (incumbent)	9,637	100.00
Total votes		9,637	100.00

Democratic primary
Party	Candidate	Votes	%
Democratic	Michael Mack	4,686	100.00
Total votes		4,686	100.00

166th District general election
Party	Candidate	Votes	%
Republican	Jesse Petrea (incumbent)	26,058	70.10
Democratic	Michael Mack	11,115	29.90
Total votes		37,173	100.00
Republican hold			

=== District 167 ===
Republican primary
Party	Candidate	Votes	%
Republican	Buddy Deloach	4,241	51.87
Republican	Jeff Jones (incumbent)	3,935	48.13
Total votes		8,176	100.00

167th District general election
Party	Candidate	Votes	%
Republican	Buddy Deloach	21,135	100.00
Total votes		21,135	100.00
Republican hold			

=== District 168 ===
Democratic primary
Party	Candidate	Votes	%
Democratic	Al Williams (incumbent)	6,641	100.00
Total votes		6,641	100.00

168th District general election
Party	Candidate	Votes	%
Democratic	Al Williams (incumbent)	17,006	100.00
Total votes		17,006	100.00
Democratic hold			

=== District 169 ===
Republican primary
Party	Candidate	Votes	%
Republican	Dominic LaRiccia (incumbent)	6,816	100.00
Total votes		6,816	100.00

Democratic primary
Party	Candidate	Votes	%
Democratic	Michael "Buckle" Moore	1,167	100.00
Total votes		1,167	100.00

169th District general election
Party	Candidate	Votes	%
Republican	Dominic LaRiccia (incumbent)	13,759	73.06
Democratic	Michael "Buckle" Moore	5,074	26.94
Total votes		18,833	100.00
Republican hold			

=== District 170 ===
Republican primary
Party	Candidate	Votes	%
Republican	Penny Houston (incumbent)	6,954	100.00
Total votes		6,954	100.00

Democratic primary
Party	Candidate	Votes	%
Democratic	Andre Oliver	1,837	100.00
Total votes		1,837	100.00

170th District general election
Party	Candidate	Votes	%
Republican	Penny Houston (incumbent)	15,626	75.84
Democratic	Andre Oliver	4,979	24.16
Total votes		20,605	100.00
Republican hold			

=== District 171 ===
Republican primary
Party	Candidate	Votes	%
Republican	Joe Campbell (incumbent)	4,879	100.00
Total votes		4,879	100.00

171st District general election
Party	Candidate	Votes	%
Republican	Joe Campbell (incumbent)	17,096	100.00
Total votes		17,096	100.00
Republican hold			

=== District 172 ===
Republican primary
Party	Candidate	Votes	%
Republican	Sam Watson (incumbent)	5,270	100.00
Total votes		5,270	100.00

172nd District general election
Party	Candidate	Votes	%
Republican	Sam Watson (incumbent)	15,556	100.00
Total votes		15,556	100.00
Republican hold			

=== District 173 ===
Republican primary
Party	Candidate	Votes	%
Republican	Darlene Taylor (incumbent)	5,596	100.00
Total votes		5,596	100.00

Democratic primary
Party	Candidate	Votes	%
Democratic	Booker T. Gainor	3,731	100.00
Total votes		3,731	100.00

173rd District general election
Party	Candidate	Votes	%
Republican	Darlene Taylor (incumbent)	14,267	59.36
Democratic	Booker T. Gainor	9,766	40.64
Total votes		24,033	100.00
Republican hold			

=== District 174 ===
Republican primary
Party	Candidate	Votes	%
Republican	John L. Corbett (incumbent)	6,549	100.00
Total votes		6,549	100.00

174th District general election
Party	Candidate	Votes	%
Republican	John L. Corbett (incumbent)	18,484	100.00
Total votes		18,484	100.00
Republican hold			

=== District 175 ===
Republican primary
Party	Candidate	Votes	%
Republican	John LaHood (incumbent)	5,937	100.00
Total votes		5,937	100.00

175th District general election
Party	Candidate	Votes	%
Republican	John LaHood (incumbent)	22,745	100.00
Total votes		22,745	100.00
Republican hold			

=== District 176 ===
Republican primary
Party	Candidate	Votes	%
Republican	James Burchett (incumbent)	6,338	100.00
Total votes		6,338	100.00

Democratic primary
Party	Candidate	Votes	%
Democratic	Evans Primus, Jr.	2,265	100.00
Total votes		2,265	100.00

176th District general election
Party	Candidate	Votes	%
Republican	James Burchett (incumbent)	15,241	71.13
Democratic	Evans Primus, Jr.	6,185	28.87
Total votes		21,426	100.00
Republican hold			

=== District 177 ===
Democratic primary
Party	Candidate	Votes	%
Democratic	Dexter L. Sharper (incumbent)	2,333	54.19
Democratic	Alvin Payton, Jr.	1,972	45.81
Total votes		4,305	100.00

177th District general election
Party	Candidate	Votes	%
Democratic	Dexter L. Sharper (incumbent)	14,598	100.00
Total votes		14,598	100.00
Democratic hold			

=== District 178 ===
Republican primary
Party	Candidate	Votes	%
Republican	Steven Meeks (incumbent)	10,869	100.00
Total votes		10,869	100.00

178th District general election
Party	Candidate	Votes	%
Republican	Steven Meeks (incumbent)	21,993	100.00
Total votes		21,993	100.00
Republican hold			

=== District 179 ===
Republican primary
Party	Candidate	Votes	%
Republican	Don Hogan (incumbent)	6,155	100.00
Total votes		6,155	100.00

Democratic primary
Party	Candidate	Votes	%
Democratic	Julie Jordan	4,528	100.00
Total votes		4,528	100.00

179th District general election
Party	Candidate	Votes	%
Republican	Don Hogan (incumbent)	15,441	56.95
Democratic	Julie Jordan	11,672	43.05
Total votes		27,113	100.00
Republican hold			

=== District 180 ===
Republican primary
Party	Candidate	Votes	%
Republican	Steven Sainz (incumbent)	6,064	100.00
Total votes		6,064	100.00

180th District general election
Party	Candidate	Votes	%
Republican	Steven Sainz (incumbent)	20,286	100.00
Total votes		20,286	100.00
Republican hold			

== See also ==
- Voter suppression in the United States 2019–2020: Georgia
- 2020 Georgia elections
- Elections in Georgia (U.S. state)
- List of Georgia state legislatures
