= Rob Leverett =

American politician

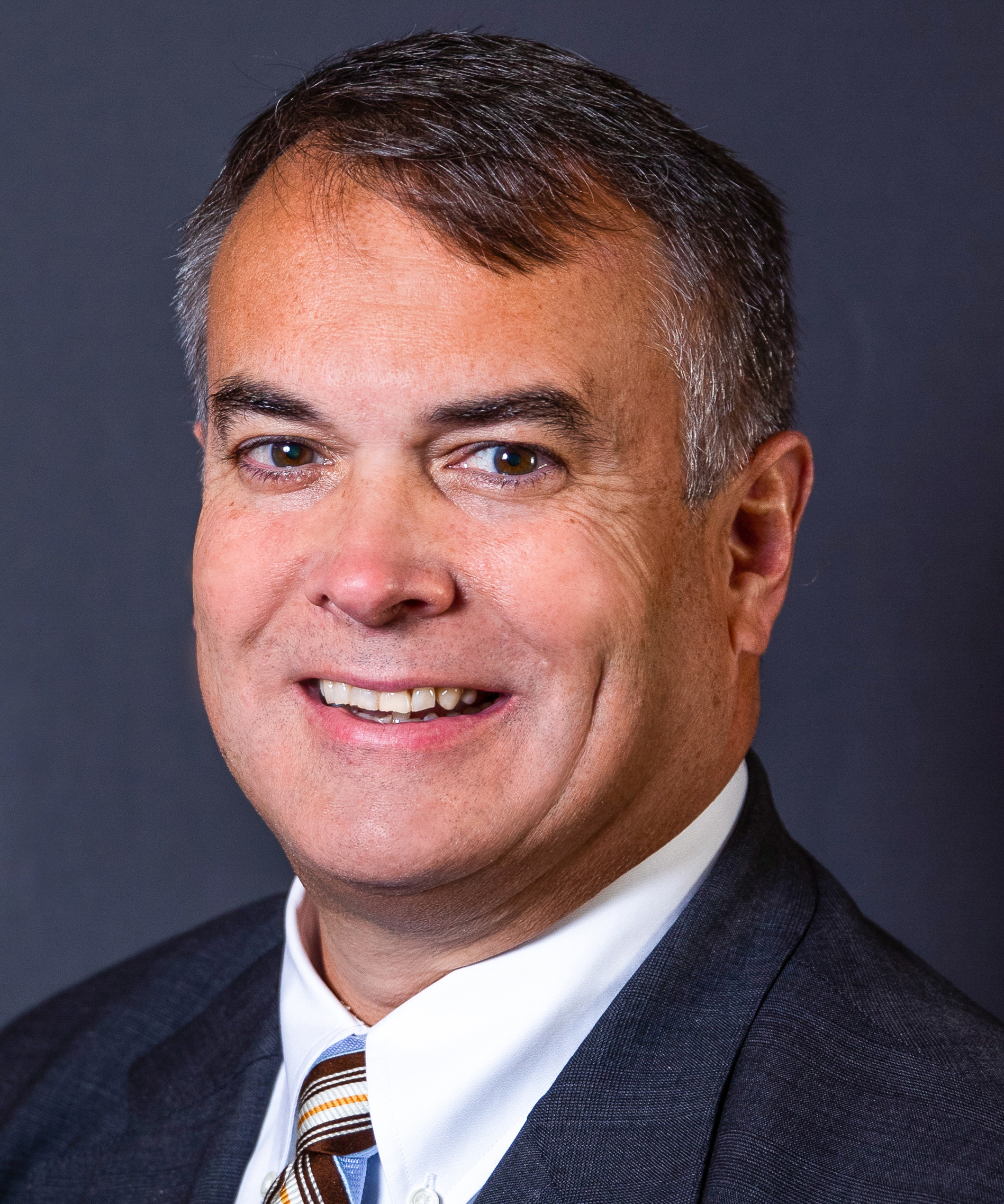
- Official headshot

Member of the Georgia House of Representatives
- Incumbent
- Assumed office January 11, 2021
- Preceded by: Tom McCall
- Constituency: 33rd District (2021–2023); 123rd District (2023–Present)

Personal details
- Born: Robert Freeman Leverett; August 5, 1964 (age 62)
- Party: Republican
- Spouse: Mary Dana
- Children: 2
- Education: Dartmouth College; University of Georgia School of Law

Robert Freeman Leverett (born August 5, 1964) is an American politician from Georgia. Leverett is Chief Deputy Majority Whip of the Georgia House of Representatives. A Republican, he is a member of Georgia House of Representatives for District 123. He was first elected in 2020.

In addition to his legislative responsibilities, he runs a private law practice focused primarily on real estate, estate planning, probate, and other general civil matters, while also serving as the City Attorney for the City of Hartwell.

== Official links ==
- Official Website

Georgia House of Representatives
Preceded by Tom McCall	Member of the Georgia House of Representatives from the 33rd district 2021–2023	Succeeded by Alan Powell
Preceded by Mark Newton	Member of the Georgia House of Representatives from the 123rd district 2023–Present	Incumbent
