= Eddie Lumsden =

Eddie Lumsden may refer to:

- Eddie Lumsden (rugby league)
- Eddie Lumsden (politician)
