= Don Parsons (politician) =

American politician

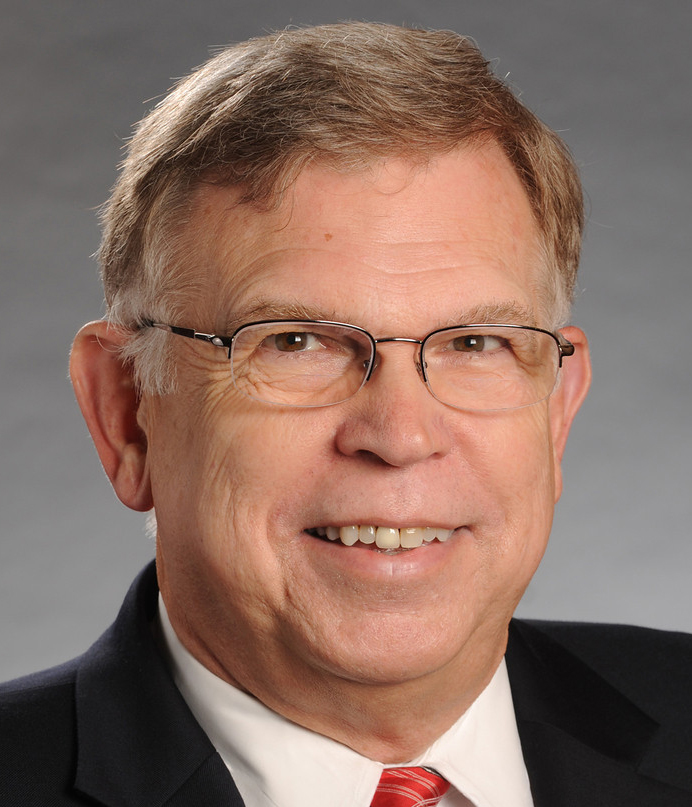

Member of the Georgia House of Representatives
- Incumbent
- Assumed office January 9, 1995
- Preceded by: Steven C. Clark
- Constituency: 40th district (1995–2003); 29th district (2003–2005); 42nd district (2005–2013); 44th district (2013–present)

Personal details
- Born: Donald Lee Parsons; July 21, 1947 (age 79)
- Party: Republican (1994–present)
- Other political affiliations: Democratic (before 1994)
- Website: donparsons.org

Donald Lee Parsons (born July 21, 1947) is a member of the House of Representatives in Georgia. Parsons is a Republican representing District 44 which encompasses parts of Cobb County.
