= Matt Dubnik =

American politician

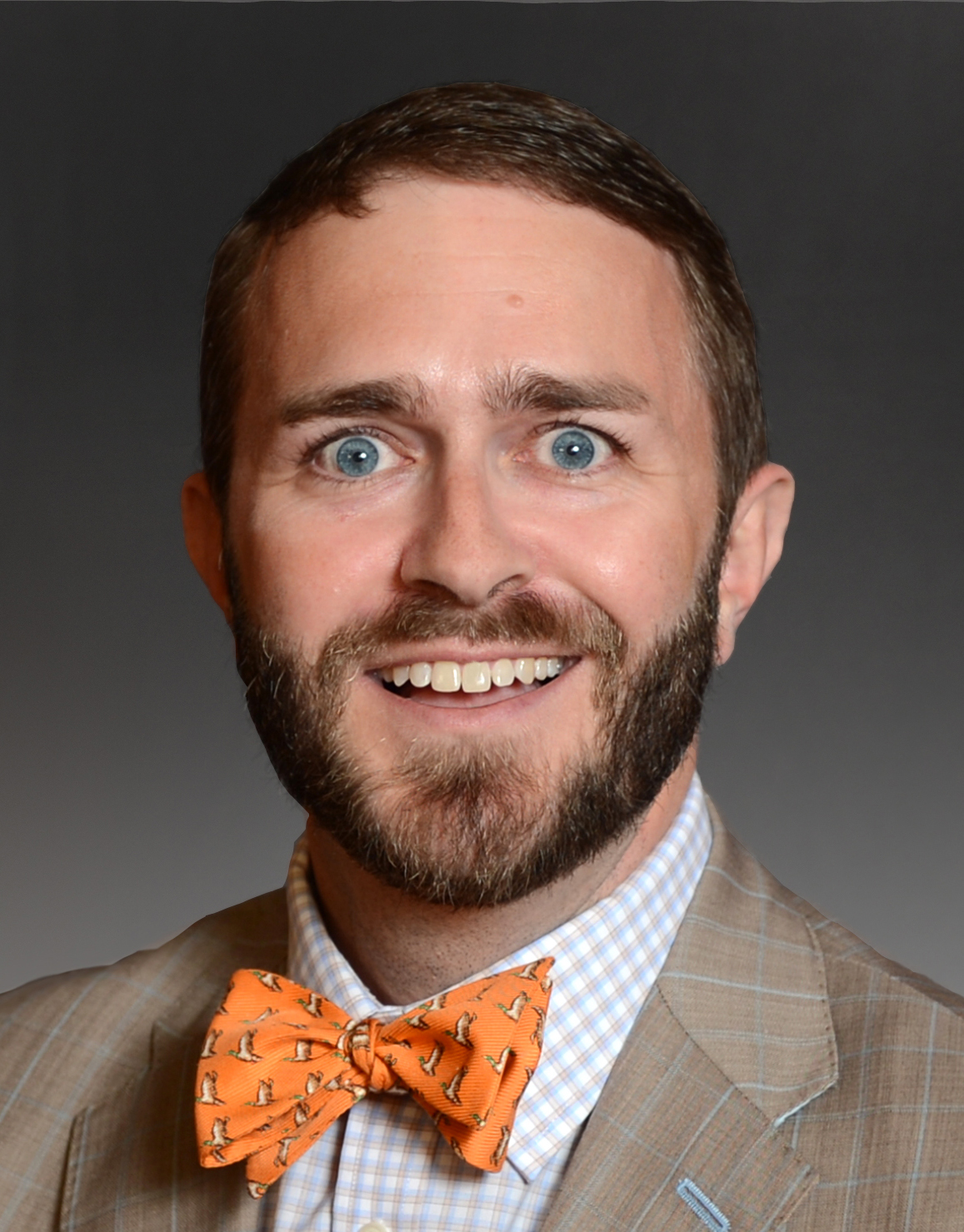

Member of the Georgia House of Representatives from the 29th district
- Incumbent
- Assumed office January 9, 2017
- Preceded by: Carl Rogers

Personal details
- Born: Matthew Scott Dubnik; March 30, 1981 (age 45) Gainesville, Georgia, U.S.
- Party: Republican
- Education: Georgia Tech

Matthew Scott Dubnik (/ˈduːbnɪk/ DOOB-nik; born March 30, 1981) is an American politician who has served in the Georgia House of Representatives from the 29th district since 2017. He is also chief engagement officer of Forum Communications, a Georgia-based marketing company. He attended Lakeview Academy, a private school in Gainesville, Georgia, and received his bachelor's degree in management and information technology from Georgia Institute of Technology.
