= Brian Prince =

American politician from Georgia

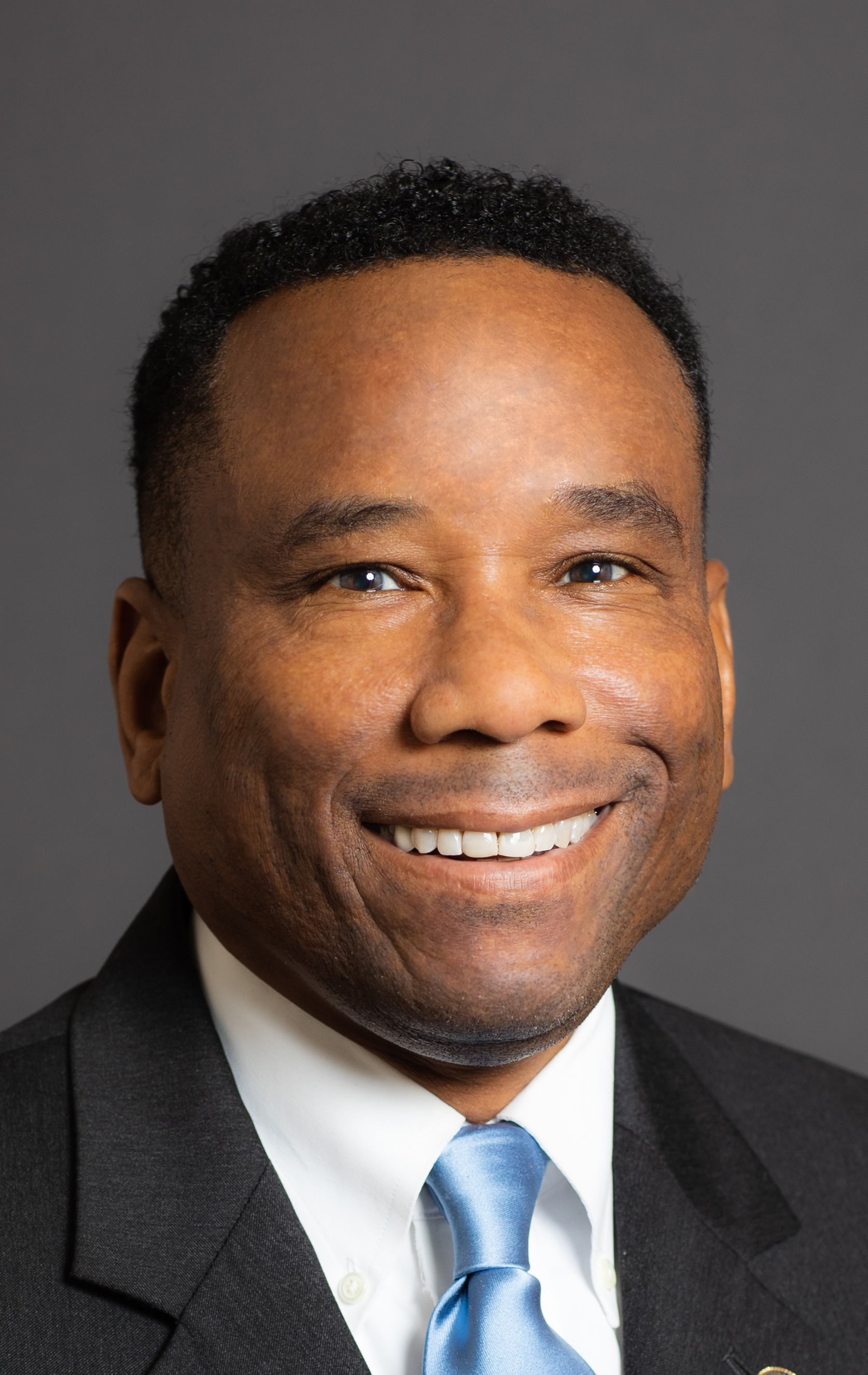

Member of the Georgia House of Representatives
- Incumbent
- Assumed office December 16, 2013
- Preceded by: Quincy Murphy
- Constituency: 127th District (2013–2023); 132nd District (2023–Present)

Personal details
- Born: Brian Lamar Prince; March 24, 1964 (age 62) Augusta, Georgia, U.S.
- Party: Democratic

Brian Lamar Prince (born March 24, 1964) is a member of the Georgia House of Representatives and a member of the Democratic Party representing District 132.

Prince serves on the Appropriations, Motor Vehicles, Special Rules, Transportation committees and the Special Committee on Access to Quality Health Care as a member. Prince serves as the Secretary of the Defense & Veterans Affairs Committee.

Georgia House of Representatives
Preceded by Quincy Murphy	Member of the Georgia House of Representatives from the 127th district 2013–2023	Succeeded by Mark Newton
Preceded by David Jenkins	Member of the Georgia House of Representatives from the 132nd district 2023–Present	Incumbent
