= Mark Newton (politician) =

American politician from Georgia

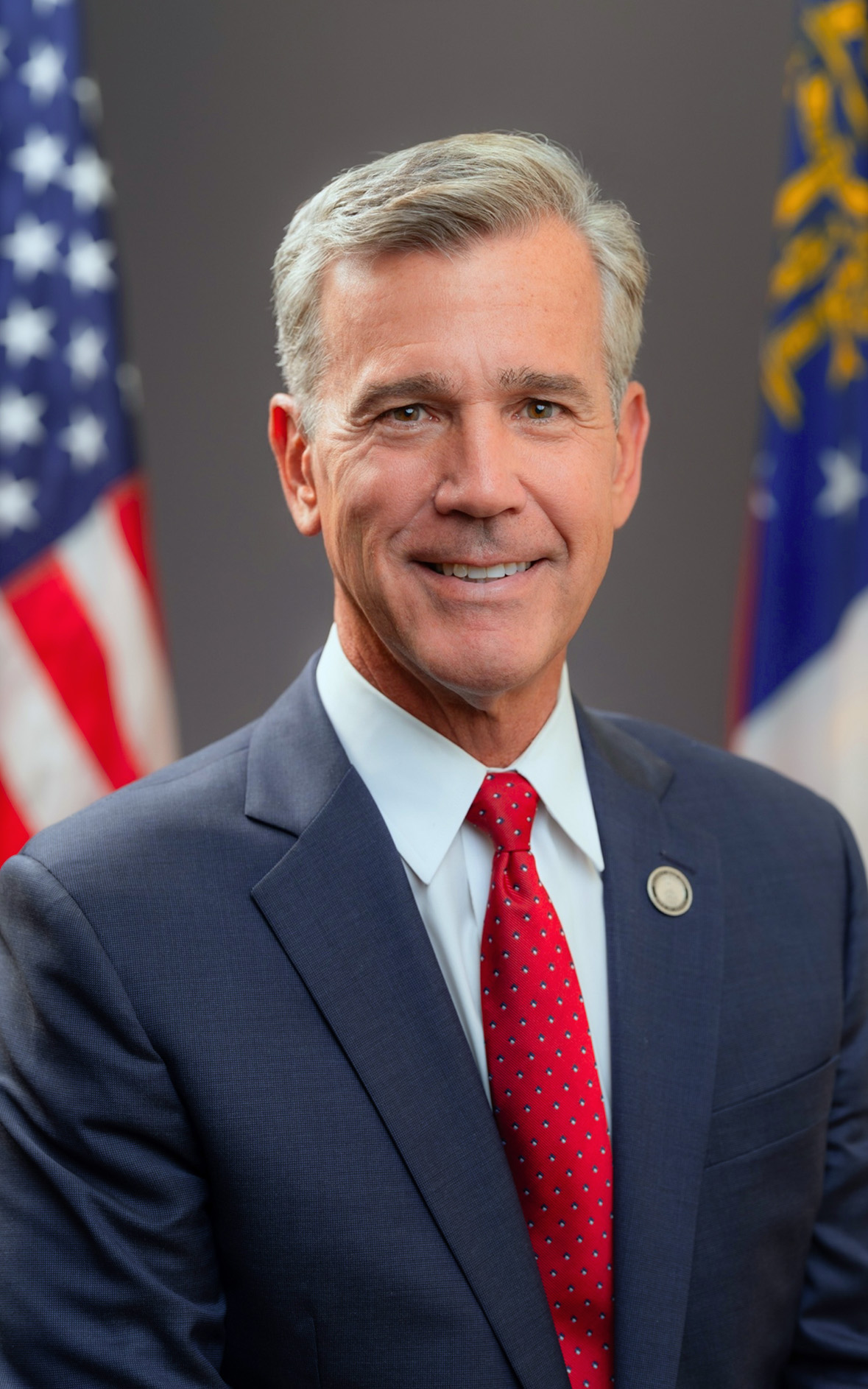
- Official headshot

Member of the Georgia House of Representatives
- Incumbent
- Assumed office January 9, 2017
- Preceded by: Barbara Sims
- Constituency: 123rd District (2017–2023); 127th District (2023–Present)

Personal details
- Born: William Mark Newton; March 17, 1960 (age 66)
- Party: Republican
- Education: University of Georgia; Harvard School of Public Health; Medical College of Georgia

William Mark Newton (born March 17, 1960) is an American politician from Georgia. Newton is a Republican member of Georgia House of Representatives for District 127.

== Biography ==
Newton was born and raised in Macon, Georgia. He is an emergency physician and has been CEO of MedNow Urgent Care Centers. His father, William R. newton, was a pediatrician.

Georgia House of Representatives
Preceded by Barbara Sims	Member of the Georgia House of Representatives from the 123rd district 2017–2023	Succeeded by Rob Leverett
Preceded by Brian Prince	Member of the Georgia House of Representatives from the 127th district 2023–Present	Incumbent
