= Alan Powell (politician) =

American politician

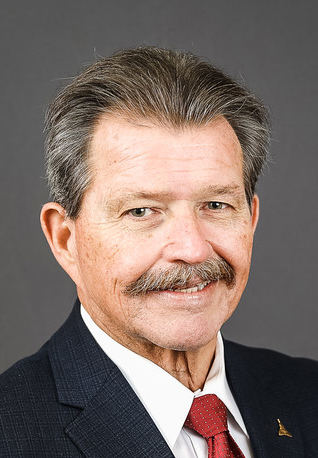

Member of the Georgia House of Representatives
- Incumbent
- Assumed office January 14, 1991
- Constituency: 13th district (1991–1993); 23rd district (1993–2005); 29th district (2005–2013); 32nd district (2013–2023); 33rd district (2023–present)

Personal details
- Born: Alan Tinsley Powell; November 10, 1951 (age 74) Hartwell, Georgia, U.S.
- Party: Republican (2010–present)
- Other political affiliations: Democratic (before 2010)

Alan Tinsley Powell (born November 10, 1951) is an American politician who has served in the Georgia House of Representatives since 1991. He was originally elected as a Democrat, but switched to a Republican in 2010, citing his conservative views. He graduated from Hart County High School, and received his Bachelors in Political Science from Georgia Southwestern State University.

== Tenure ==
Powell is the current representative of Georgia House District 33, which consists of Hart, Franklin and part of Madison counties. He has served on a number of committees in Georgia's House, including as Chairman of the Motor Vehicles and Public Safety Committee. Governor Nathan Deal also appointed him to serve on the Board of Homeland Security in 2018.

He has been a strong advocate of the Second Amendment, pro-life policies, and elderly/rural healthcare. He has been recognized by numerous organizations as Legislator of the Year and has received awards from the Emory Center for Injury Prevention, the NRA Institute for Legislative Action and the National FFA Organization, among others. He received an Associate Life Membership from the Peace Officers Association of Georgia and is a Distinguished Member of GeorgiaCarry.

Among other legislation, Powell supported the Election Integrity Act of 2021. Some of the provisions contained in the act included restrictions on where ballot drop boxes could be located and when they could be accessed, requiring photo identification for absentee voting, shifting back the deadline to request an absentee ballot, limited early voting hours, and preventing anyone other than poll workers from giving food and water to voters standing in lines. It also restricted early voting on Sundays, which critics claimed was "voter suppression". Powell defended the bill, saying "Show me the suppression. There is no suppression in this bill." The legislation was passed along party lines by the Georgia House in a vote of 100–75, and by the Senate in a vote of 34–20, on March 25, 2021. Axios later stated that "99% of Georgia voters in the 2022 election reported no trouble casting their ballots."

Powell was re-elected to a seventeenth two-year term in Georgia's House during the 2024 elections, having run unopposed and garnering over 29,000 votes.
