= Barbara Sims =

American politician

Member of the Georgia House of Representatives from the 123rd district
- In office January 14, 2013 – January 9, 2017
- Preceded by: Gloria Frazier
- Succeeded by: Mark Newton

Member of the Georgia House of Representatives from the 119th district
- In office January 8, 2007 – January 14, 2013
- Preceded by: Sue Burmeister
- Succeeded by: Chuck Williams

Personal details
- Born: March 18, 1939 (age 87) LaGrange, Georgia, U.S.
- Party: Republican

Barbara Sims (born March 18, 1939) is an American politician who served in the Georgia House of Representatives from 2007 to 2017.
