= Brad Thomas (American politician) =

American politician

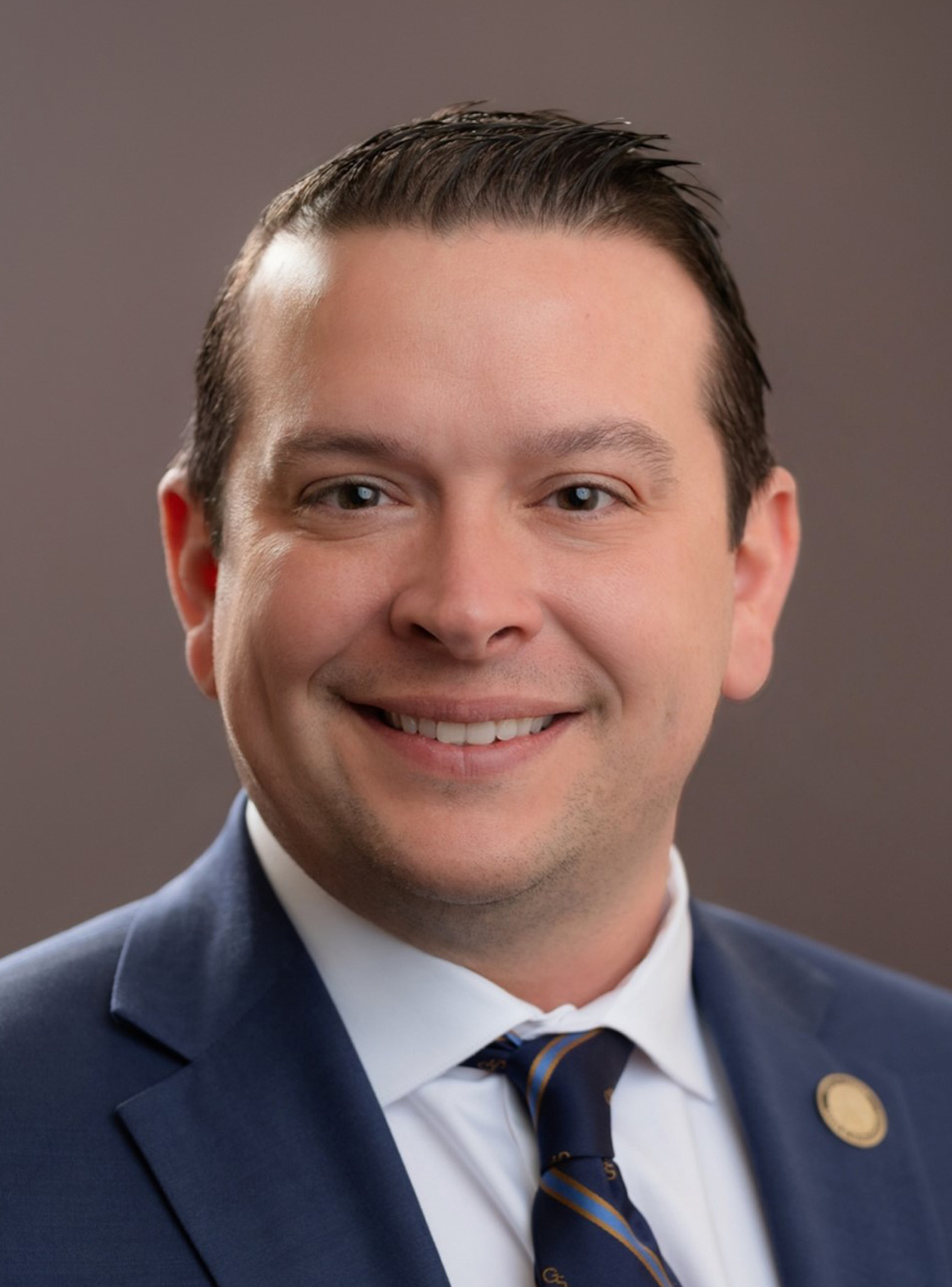

Member of the Georgia House of Representatives from the 21st district
- Incumbent
- Assumed office January 11, 2021
- Preceded by: Scot Turner

Personal details
- Born: Brad David Thomas; August 12, 1979 (age 46)
- Party: Republican
- Spouse: Jennifer

Brad David Thomas (August 12, 1979) is an American politician from Georgia. Thomas is a Republican member of Georgia House of Representatives for District 21.
