= David Wilkerson (politician) =

American politician

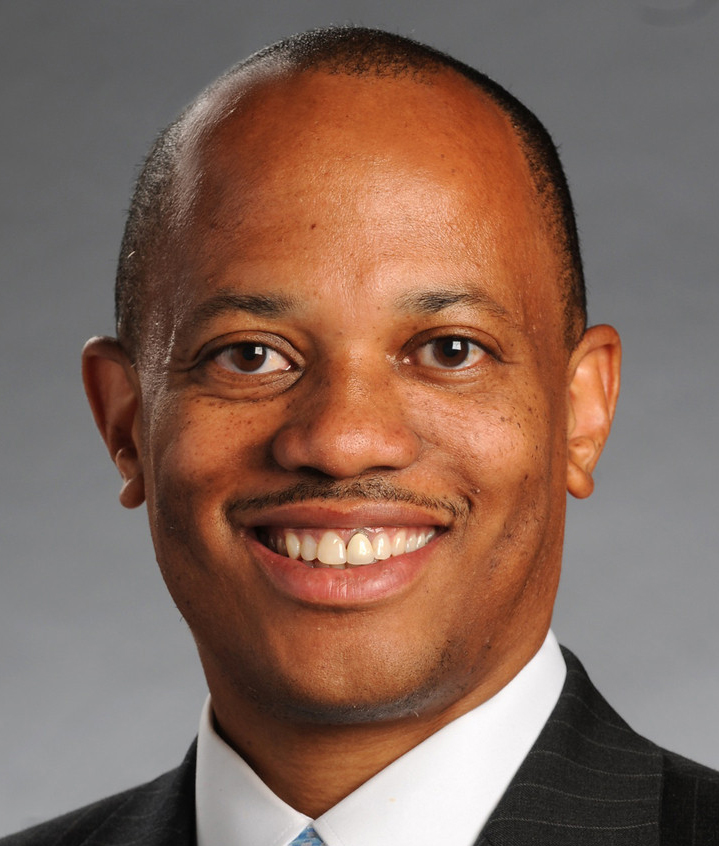

Minority Whip of the Georgia House of Representatives
- Incumbent
- Assumed office January 11, 2021
- Preceded by: William Boddie

Member of the Georgia House of Representatives from the 38th district
- Incumbent
- Assumed office January 14, 2013
- Preceded by: Sam Teasley

Member of the Georgia House of Representatives from the 33rd district
- In office January 10, 2011 – January 14, 2013
- Preceded by: Don Wix
- Succeeded by: Tom McCall

Personal details
- Born: David Lawrence Wilkerson; January 6, 1969 (age 57) Cookstown, New Jersey, U.S.
- Party: Democratic
- Spouse: Penny
- Education: North Carolina A&T State University (BS)
- Profession: Accountant

David Lawrence Wilkerson (born January 6, 1969) is an American politician and Certified Public Accountant from the state of Georgia. A member of the Democratic Party, Wilkerson has served in the Georgia House of Representatives since 2011 and as the Minority Whip since 2021.

In February 2019, Wilkerson was unanimously elected chair of the Cobb County legislative delegation, following a period of dispute after the county's shift from Republican to Democratic in the 2018 midterm elections.
