= Quincy Murphy =

American businessman and politician

Representative Quincy Murphy

Member of the Georgia House of Representatives from the 127th district
- In office 2002–2013
- Succeeded by: Brian Prince

Personal details
- Born: August 18, 1952 Atlanta, Georgia, U.S.
- Died: August 2, 2013 (aged 60) Augusta, Georgia, U.S.
- Party: Democratic Party
- Spouse: Linda Dianne Murphy
- Children: William Quincy, III and Jennifer Alishia
- Education: North Carolina Agricultural and Technical State University
- Profession: Insurance company owner

William Quincy Murphy, Jr. (August 18, 1952 – August 2, 2013) was an American businessman and politician.

== Biography ==
Born in Atlanta, Georgia, Murphy graduated from North Carolina Agricultural and Technical State University. He owned an insurance company in Augusta, Georgia: Quincy Murphy and Associates. He served in the Georgia House of Representatives as a Democrat from 2002 until his death from cancer. He died in Augusta, Georgia.
