= Steve Tarvin =

American politician from Georgia

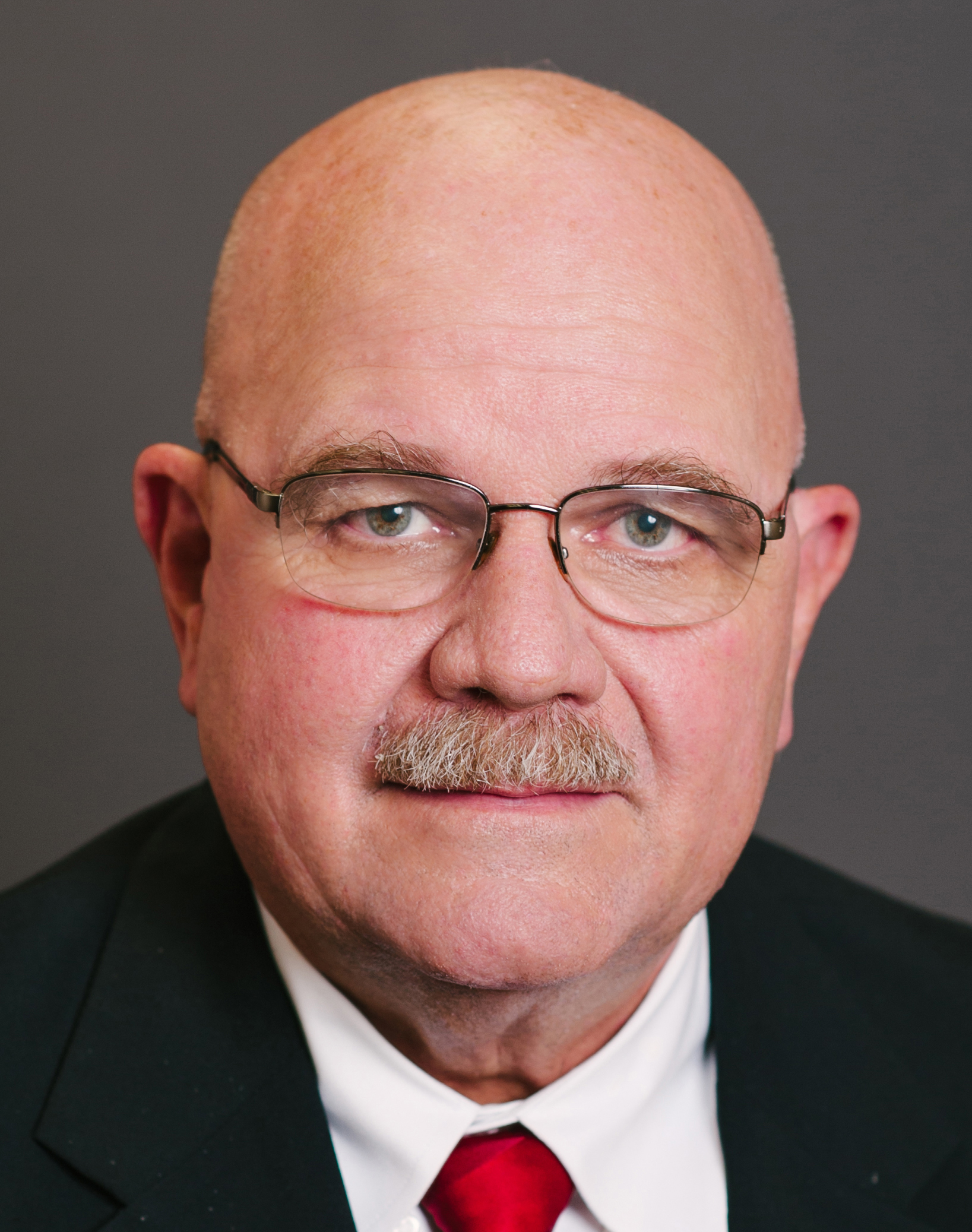

Member of the Georgia House of Representatives from the 2nd district
- Incumbent
- Assumed office February 11, 2014
- Preceded by: Jay Neal

Personal details
- Born: Thomas Stephen Tarvin; June 2, 1951 (age 75) Chickamauga, Georgia, U.S.
- Party: Republican
- Spouse: Jennifer Tarvin
- Children: 2
- Occupation: Politician (serving in the 152nd, 153rd, 154th, 155th, 156th, 157th, 158th & 159th Georgia General Assemblies)
- Website: www.stevetarvin.com

Thomas Stephen Tarvin (born June 2, 1951) is an American politician from Georgia. Tarvin is a Republican member of the Georgia House of Representatives, representing the 2nd District since 2014.

== Early life ==
Steve Tarvin was born on June 2, 1951 to Thomas William Tarvin and Mackie Jean Young in Chickamauga, Georgia.

== Education ==
Tarvin attended Gordon Lee High School and the University of Georgia.

== Political Career ==
Tarvin ran unsuccessfully for U.S. Congress Georgia District 9 in 2010.

In January 2014 Tarvin and two opponents ran in a Special Election to fill the Georgia State House of Representatives District 2 seat vacated by Representative Jay Neal. Advancing to the February 4, 2014 Special Election Runoff, Tarvin won becoming a member of the 152nd Georgia House of Representatives defeating Neal Florence with 53.86% of the votes. Tarvin was sworn into office on February 11, 2014.

On May 20, 2014, three months after his swearing in Tarvin won a primary challenge from 2 opponents garnering 65.93% of the vote, then on November 4, 2014, as an incumbent Tarvin won unopposed in the General election and continued serving District 2.

In the 2016 Republican Primary and the November 8, 2016 General Election Tarvin won both elections unopposed and continued serving District 2.

Tarvin again ran unopposed in the 2018 Republican Primary and then won the November 6, 2018 General Election. Tarvin garnered 99.2% of the vote defeating Democrat Michelle Simmons and continued serving District 2.

In the 2020 Republican Primary and the November 3, 2020 General Primary, Tarvin won unopposed and continued serving District 2.

On May 24, 2022, Tarvin was challenged and again won a 3 person Republican Primary receiving 66% of the vote, winning all 11 precincts in Georgia House District 2 besting each opponent by over 50 percentage points. He went on to win the General election unopposed.

Again in the 2024 Republican Primary and General Election Tarvin ran unopposed and was reelected to the Georgia House of Representatives.

The 2026 Republican Primary saw Tarvin win the Party’s nomination for Georgia House District 2 Representative with a 62.96% to 31.04% result. Winning 13 of the District’s 14 precincts, losing his opponent’s home precinct by 27 votes.

== Personal life ==
Tarvin and his wife Jennifer Lance Tarvin live in Chickamauga, Georgia. They have two children, eight grandchildren and one great-grandchild.
