= Carl Rogers (politician) =

American politician

Member of the Georgia House of Representatives from the 29th district
- In office 1995–2016
- Succeeded by: Geoff Duncan

Personal details
- Party: Republican (since 2004)
- Other political affiliations: Democratic (until 2004)

Carl W. Rogers is an American politician. He was a member of the Georgia House of Representatives from the 29th District from 1995 to 2016.

In 2004, he switched parties from Democrat to Republican. In 2016, he became vice president of economic development at Lanier Technical College.

== See also ==
- List of party switchers in the United States
