= Georgia's 127th House of Representatives district =

State district in Georgia, USA

Georgia's 127th State House of Representatives district
Representative
Mark Newton; R–Augusta
- Demographics: 35.3% White; 54.3% Black; 6.5% Hispanic; 1.8% Asian
- Population: 53,731

District 127 elects one member of the Georgia House of Representatives. It contains parts of Columbia County and Richmond County.

== Members ==
- Quincy Murphy (2002–2013)
- Brian Prince (2013–2023)
- Mark Newton (since 2023)
