= Katie Dempsey =

American politician

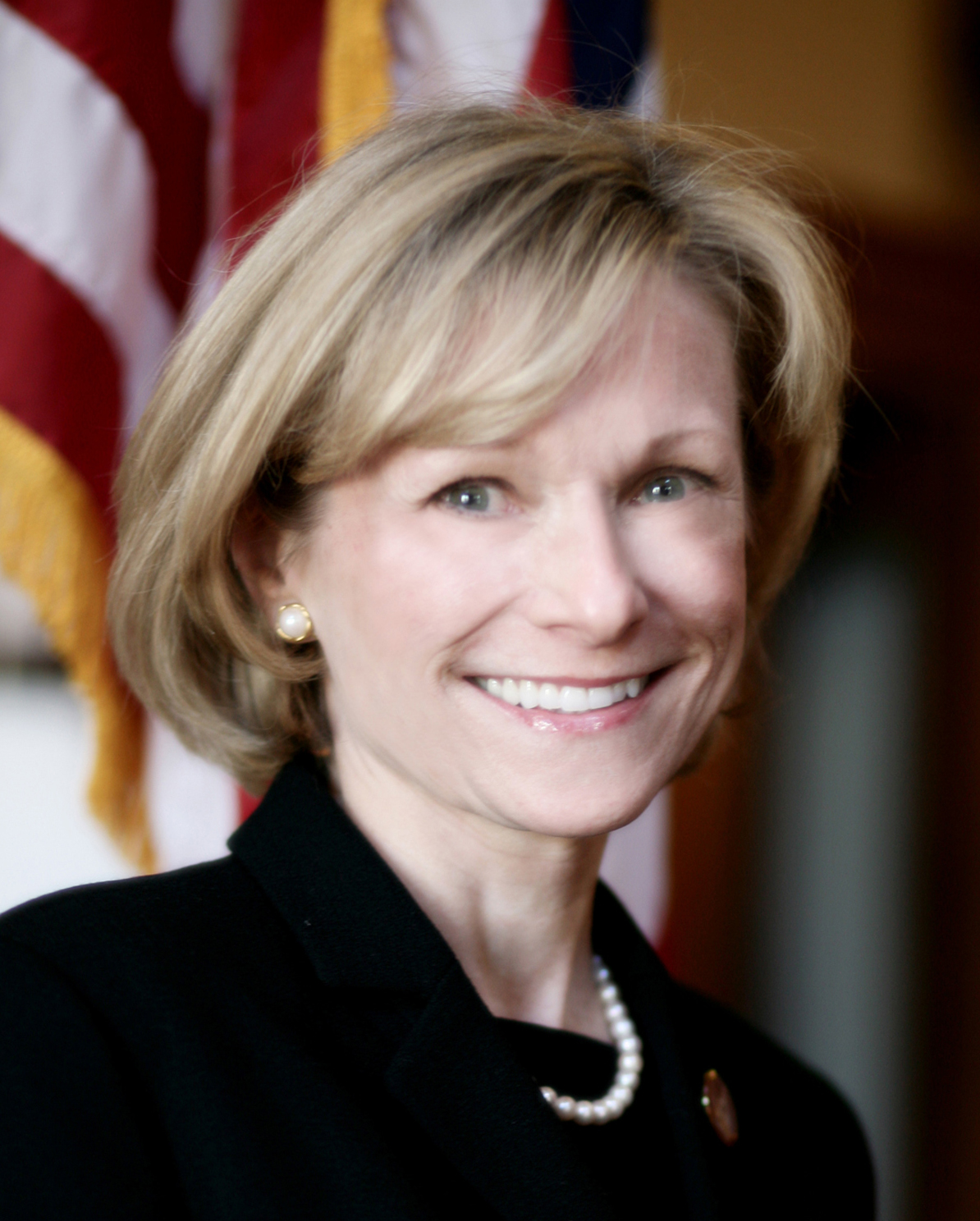
- Official portrait, 2025

Member of the Georgia House of Representatives from the 13th district
- Incumbent
- Assumed office January 8, 2007
- Preceded by: Paul Smith

Personal details
- Born: September 11, 1952 (age 73)
- Party: Republican
- Spouse: Lynn

Katie Montgomery Dempsey (born September 11, 1952) is an American politician from Georgia. Dempsey is a Republican member of the Georgia House of Representatives for District 13.
