= Georgia's 33rd House of Representatives district =

State district in Georgia, USA

Georgia's 33rd State House of Representatives district
Representative
Alan Powell; R–Hartwell
- Demographics: 71.4% White; 21.9% Black; 4.8% Hispanic; 0.8% Asian
- Population: 52,532

District 33 elects one member of the Georgia House of Representatives. It contains the entirety of Franklin County and Hart County, as well as parts of Madison County.

== Members ==
- Don Wix (1997–2010)
- David Wilkerson (2011–2013)
- Tom McCall (2013–2021)
- Rob Leverett (2021–2023)
- Alan Powell (since 2023)
