= Georgia's 32nd House of Representatives district =

State district in Georgia, USA

Georgia's 32nd State House of Representatives district
Representative
Chris Erwin; R–Homer
- Demographics: 81.7% White; 13.0% Black; 3.5% Hispanic; 0.8% Asian
- Population: 54,257

District 32 elects one member of the Georgia House of Representatives. It contains the entirety of Banks County and Stephens County, as well as parts of Habersham County and Jackson County.

== Members ==
- Alan Powell (2013–2023)
- Chris Erwin (since 2023)
