= Georgia's 44th House of Representatives district =

State district in Georgia, USA

Georgia's 44th State House of Representatives district
Representative
Don Parsons; R–Marietta
- Demographics: 71.3% White; 12.8% Black; 6.9% Hispanic; 5.9% Asian
- Population: 56,198

District 44 elects one member of the Georgia House of Representatives. It contains parts of Cobb County.

== Members ==
- Don Parsons (since 2013)
