= Georgia's 123rd House of Representatives district =

State district in Georgia, USA

Georgia's 123rd State House of Representatives district
Representative
Rob Leverett; R–Elberton
- Demographics: 71.6% White; 17.9% Black; 4.1% Hispanic; 4.0% Asian
- Population: 55,210

District 123 elects one member of the Georgia House of Representatives. It contains the entirety of Elbert County, Lincoln County and Wilkes County, as well as parts of Columbia County and Madison County.

== Members ==
- Alberta Anderson (1997–2003)
- Gloria Frazier (2007–2013)
- Barbara Sims (2013–2017)
- Mark Newton (2017–2023)
- Rob Leverett (since 2023)
