= Georgia's 12th House of Representatives district =

State district in Georgia, USA

Georgia's 12th State House of Representatives district
Representative
Eddie Lumsden; R–Armuchee
- Demographics: 83.1% White; 8.3% Black; 5.7% Hispanic; 1.2% Asian
- Population: 53,451

District 12 elects one member of the Georgia House of Representatives. It contains the entirety of Chattooga County as well as parts of Floyd County.

== Members ==
- Eddie Lumsden (since 2013)
