= Georgia's 21st House of Representatives district =

State district in Georgia, USA

Georgia's 21st State House of Representatives district
Representative
Brad Thomas; R–Holly Springs
- Demographics: 80.2% White; 5.9% Black; 10.4% Hispanic; 1.2% Asian
- Population: 58,092

District 21 elects one member of the Georgia House of Representatives. It contains parts of Cherokee County.

== Members ==
- Scot Turner (2013–2021)
- Brad Thomas (since 2021)
