= Tom McCall (Georgia politician) =

American politician

Member of the Georgia House of Representatives
- In office January 9, 1995 – January 11, 2021
- Preceded by: Charles W. Yeargin
- Succeeded by: Rob Leverett
- Constituency: 90th district (1995–2003); 78th district (2003–2005); 30th district (2005–2013); 33rd district (2013–2021)

Personal details
- Born: Thomas Allen McCall; February 14, 1956 (age 70) Elberton, Georgia, U.S.
- Party: Republican (2004–present)
- Other political affiliations: Democratic (before 2004)
- Spouse: Jane
- Children: 3
- Education: University of Georgia
- Profession: farmer

Thomas Allen McCall (born February 14, 1956) is an American politician who was a member of the Georgia House of Representatives from 1995 until 2021. Initially elected as a Democrat, he switched parties and became a Republican prior to his 2004 re-election.

He is currently the president of the Georgia Farm Bureau.
