= Georgia's 13th House of Representatives district =

State district in Georgia, USA

Georgia's 13th State House of Representatives district
Representative
Katie Dempsey; R–Rome
- Demographics: 60.6% White; 21.1% Black; 14.2% Hispanic; 1.5% Asian
- Population: 53,623

District 13 elects one member of the Georgia House of Representatives. It contains as parts of Floyd County.

== Members ==
- Katie Dempsey (since 2007)
