= Scot Turner =

American politician

Scot Turner (born January 23, 1976) is an American politician who served as a Republican member of the Georgia House of Representatives, representing District 21, from February 12, 2013, to January 2021. District 21 encompassed parts of Cherokee County.

== Early life and education ==
Scot Turner was born in Kentucky, grew up in Deltona, Florida, and graduated from Deltona High School in 1994. Turner later attended Kennesaw State University.

== Career ==
Before entering politics, Turner worked in the private sector, focusing on technology and business development. His professional background helped shape his legislative priorities, particularly in areas involving technology, transparency, and economic development.

== Political career ==
Turner was first elected to the Georgia House of Representatives in a special election held in January 2013, which went to a runoff in February that year. He was sworn in on February 12, 2013. When Turner ran for office in 2012, he promised to self-impose a term limit of four consecutive terms. As a result he retired at the end of his last term in January 2021.

Throughout his legislative career, Turner served on several committees, including:

- Agriculture and Consumer Affairs

- Governmental Affairs

- Human Relations and Aging

- Science and Technology

- Small Business Development

- Special Rules

- State Planning and Community Affairs

Turner quickly established himself as an advocate for government transparency and fiscal responsibility. In 2019, Turner was one of ten Georgia legislators who called on House Speaker David Ralston to resign following allegations of abuse of legislative leave to delay court cases for his legal clients.

=== Legislative achievements ===
Some of Turner’s notable legislative efforts include:

- Advocating for reform to civil asset forfeiture, emphasizing the need for a conviction before assets could be seized by the government. Turner also contributed to a 2022 report on civil asset forfeiture in Georgia published by the U.S. Commission on Civil Rights, highlighting systemic issues and potential reforms.

- Addressing the issue of superliens, which had negatively impacted Georgia homeowners by allowing private companies to purchase liens on properties and keep the equity above the value of the lien.

- Preserving professionals’ ability to maintain their licenses if they fell behind on student loans, preventing undue career disruptions.

- Advocating for the use of risk-limiting audits to verify election results, a practice that would later be cited by Georgia Secretary of State Brad Raffensperger as the basis for the hand recounting of every ballot cast in Georgia during the 2020 presidential election.

== Nonprofit career ==
=== Eternal Vigilance Action ===
Following his retirement, Turner founded Eternal Vigilance Action Inc., a nonprofit organization focused on protecting constitutional principles and ensuring government accountability. In 2024, Eternal Vigilance Action gained national attention after successfully challenging the Georgia State Election Board in court. The lawsuit argued that several newly implemented election rules were unconstitutional, claiming they violated state election laws and overstepped the authority of the unelected board.

A Fulton County Superior Court ruling sided with the organization, striking down the rules as inconsistent with Georgia law. The case emphasized the importance of limiting administrative overreach and protecting the separation of powers inspired by the United States Supreme Court overturning the Chevron Doctrine earlier in the year. Turner highlighted the case as a defense of voters' rights and legislative integrity, reflecting his long-standing commitment to transparency and accountability.

In May 2023, Turner testified before the United States Congress about how Georgia has secured its elections. During his testimony, he provided examples of measures taken to enhance election security and detailed how both major political parties have attacked election outcomes to delegitimize the winners.

Another notable initiative of Eternal Vigilance Action was the development and promotion of the Coleman-Baker Act, signed into law in 2023. The act, inspired by the *Fox Hunter* podcast by Sean Kipe, aims to assist families of cold case murder victims by establishing clear guidelines for reopening investigations. Named after Tara Louise Baker and Rhonda Sue Coleman, the law enables family members to request reinvestigations for cases dating back to 1970 if they meet specific criteria.

The law received widespread attention in May 2024 when an Athens man was arrested and charged with the murder of Tara Louise Baker, marking significant progress in a two-decade-old cold case. This milestone underscored the importance of the Coleman-Baker Act in providing closure to families and advancing justice through new investigative techniques.

== Peach pundit ==
In September 2022, Turner became the owner and publisher of Peach Pundit, a prominent Georgia-focused political blog. Under his leadership, the platform has continued its tradition of providing a range of perspectives on political issues in Georgia, from policy debates to election commentary. Turner’s stewardship has emphasized fostering dialogue across political divides while maintaining a focus on transparency and accountability
