= Eddie Lumsden (politician) =

American politician

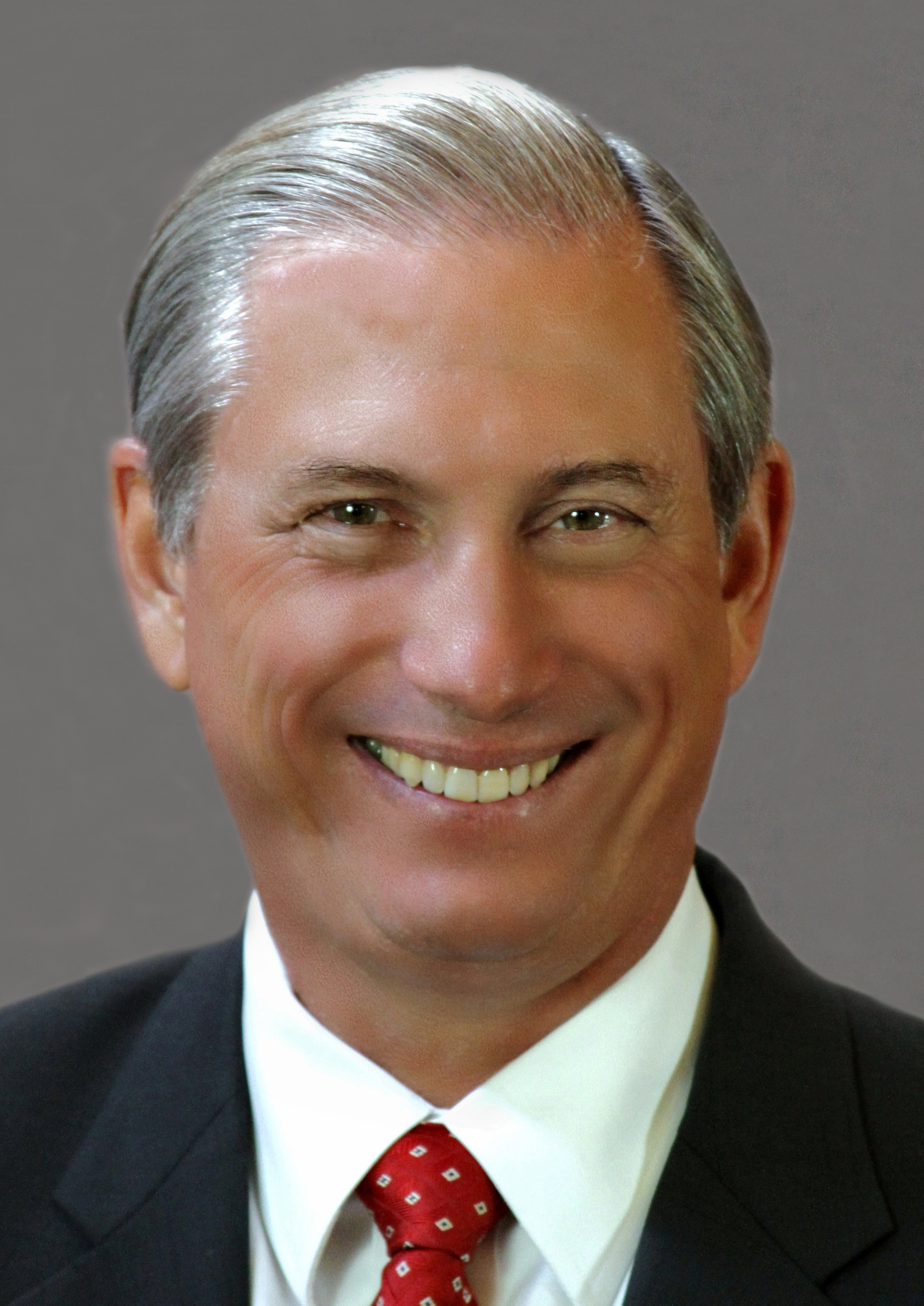

Member of the Georgia House of Representatives from the 12th district
- Incumbent
- Assumed office January 14, 2013
- Preceded by: Rick Jasperse

Personal details
- Born: James E Lumsden; August 25, 1952 (age 73)
- Party: Republican

James Eddie Lumsden (born August 25, 1952) is an American politician who has served in the Georgia House of Representatives from the 12th district since 2013. He assumed office on January 14, 2013. Lumsden ran for re-election to the Georgia House of Representatives to represent District 12. He was on the ballot in the general election on November 5, 2024. He advanced from the Republican primary on May 21, 2024.
