= Georgia's 29th House of Representatives district =

State district in Georgia, USA

Georgia's 29th State House of Representatives district
Representative
Matt Dubnik; R–Gainesville
- Demographics: 40.5% White; 12.7% Black; 43.5% Hispanic; 2.5% Asian
- Population: 55,980

District 29 elects one member of the Georgia House of Representatives. It contains parts of Hall County.

== Members ==
- Carl Rogers (1995–2017)
- Matt Dubnik (since 2017)
