= 2008 Georgia House of Representatives election =

Georgia House of Representatives elections, 2008
- November 4, 2008

All 180 seats in the Georgia House of Representatives

	Majority party	Minority party
Leader	Glenn Richardson	DuBose Porter
Party	Republican	Democratic
Leader's seat	19th-Hiram	143rd-Dublin
Last election	106	74
Seats won	105	75
Seat change	▼1	▲1
Popular vote	1,945,960	1,312,203
Percentage	59.7%	40.3%
- Results: Democratic hold Democratic gain Republican hold Republican gain
Speaker before election
Glenn Richardson
Republican
Elected Speaker
Glenn Richardson
Republican

The 2008 Georgia House of Representatives elections occurred on November 4, 2008, to elect the members to the Georgia House of Representatives. All fifty-six seats in the state Senate and all 180 seats in the state House were up for two-year terms. The winners of this election cycle served in the 150th Georgia General Assembly.

A special election was held for Democrat Bobby Parham's seat in District 141, and the race went into a runoff in December 2009. Rusty Kidd, an independent, won the seat.

== Predictions ==
Source	Ranking	As of
Stateline	Safe R	October 15, 2008

== Results ==
District 8
Rep. Charles F. Jenkins (D-Blairsville) received a strong challenge from Stephen Allison (R) in 2008. Jenkins had survived a close call in the previous state House election and thus was a prime target of Peach State Republicans. Allison ultimately prevailed by a narrow margin.

Georgia State House District 8
Party	Candidate	Votes	%	±%
Republican	Stephen Allison	13,228	51.6%	
Democratic	Charles F. Jenkins	12,389	48.4%	
Majority		839	3.2	
Turnout		25,617		
Republican gain from Democratic		Swing	3.1	

District 13
Rep. Katie Dempsey (R-Rome) sought re-election in Floyd County, and faced her 2006 challenger Bob Puckett (who lost by just 168 votes) again. Despite Puckett's strong and energetic campaign, Dempsey ultimately prevailed again, this time defeating Puckett by 289 votes.

Georgia State House District 13
Party	Candidate	Votes	%	±%
Republican	Katie M. Dempsey	7,527	51	
Democratic	Bob Puckett	7,238	49	
Majority		289	2	
Turnout		14,765		
Republican hold		Swing		

District 15
Incumbent Rep. Jeff Lewis (R-White) was defeated for renomination by Paul R. Battles by a margin of 51.6% to 48.4%. Battles subsequently won the general election without opposition.

District 16
Rep. Rick Crawford (D-Cedartown) faced a challenge from Bob Culver (R). Crawford was elected to the Georgia House of Representatives by narrow margin in 2006 and thus Georgian Republicans targeted the freshman Representative for defeat. Despite Republican efforts to oust him, Crawford won re-election, albeit by another close margin.

Georgia State House District 13
Party	Candidate	Votes	%	±%
Democratic	Rick Crawford	8,461	50.5%	
Republican	Bob Culver	8,279	49.5%	
Majority		182	1	
Turnout		16,740		
Democratic hold		Swing		

District 95
Democrat George Wilson of Stone Mountain lost to incumbent Rep. Robert Mumford (R-Conyers) in 2006 by about 500 votes. Wilson is running again, but Mumford is retiring. "Obama at the top would be a plus," Wilson said. "We got so close." Erick Hunt would win the Republican primary without opposition but Wilson would lose the Democratic nod to Toney L. Collins who would go on to defeat Hunt 61.8% to 38.2%

Georgia State House District 95
Party	Candidate	Votes	%	±%
Democratic	Toney L. Collins	18,527	61.8	
Republican	Erick Hunt	11,442	38.2	
Majority		7,085	23.6	
Turnout		29,969		
Democratic gain from Republican		Swing	13.55	
