= Amos Amerson =

American politician

Member of the Georgia House of Representatives from the 7th district
- In office January 8, 2001 – January 13, 2003
- Preceded by: Ben Whitaker
- Succeeded by: Benjamin Bridges

Member of the Georgia House of Representatives from the 9th district
- In office January 13, 2003 – January 14, 2013
- Preceded by: Benjamin Bridges
- Succeeded by: Kevin Tanner

Personal details
- Born: January 30, 1935 (age 91) Washington County, Georgia, U.S.
- Party: Republican
- Spouse: Anne Amerson
- Children: 3
- Occupation: U.S. military personnel, educator, politician

Amos Amerson (born January 30, 1935) is an American military personnel, educator, and former politician from Georgia. Amerson was a Republican member of Georgia House of Representatives from 2001 to 2013. He served the 9th District.

== Early life ==
On January 30, 1935, Amerson was born in Washington County, Georgia.

== Education ==
In 1956, Amerson earned a Bachelor of Science degree from North Georgia College. In 1964, Amerson earned a Bachelor of Science degree from United States Naval Post Graduate School. In 1972, Amerson earned an MBA in Quantitative Methods from University of Hawaii. In 1993, Amerson earned a PhD in Economics/Statistics from American University in London.

== Career ==
In 1956, Amerson served in the United States Army and retired as a lieutenant colonel in 1978.

In 1978, Amerson was a lieutenant/analysis in the United States Department of Energy, until 1979.

In 1982, Amerson became an associate professor at North Georgia College and State University until 1998.

Amerson was a staff in Joint Chiefs of Staff's Joint Strategic Targeting Planning organization. Amerson was a chief of the Strategic Analysis Section.

== Personal life ==
Amerson's wife is Anne Amerson. They have three children. Amerson and his family live in Dahlonega, Georgia.

== See also ==
- 146th Georgia General Assembly
