= Will Wade (Georgia politician) =

Republican state politician from Georgia, United States

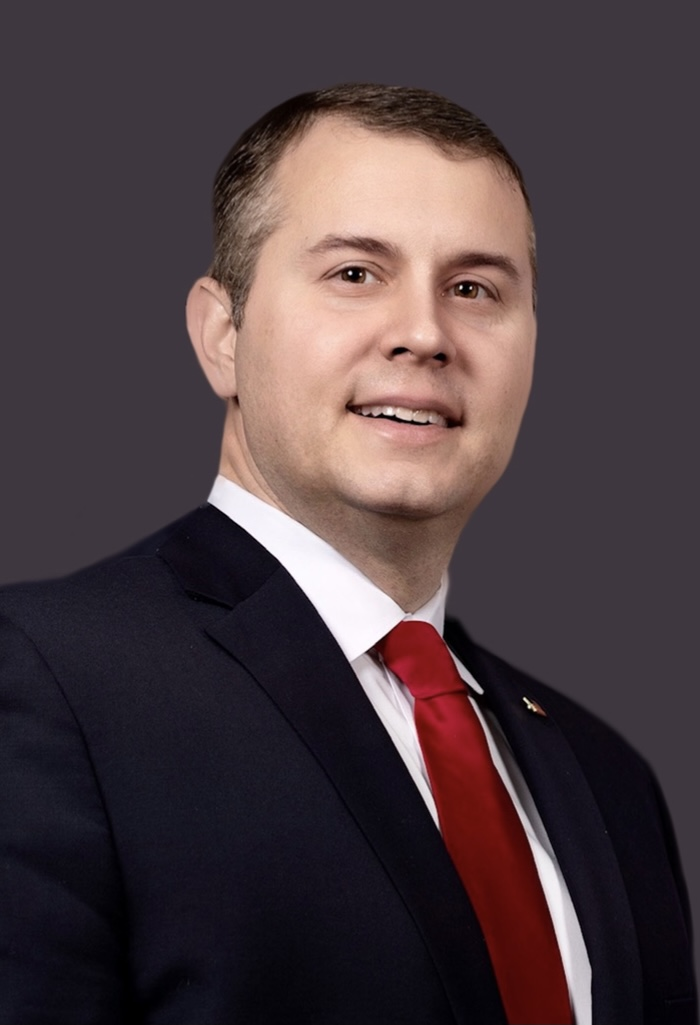

Member of the Georgia House of Representatives from the 9th district
- Incumbent
- Assumed office January 11, 2021
- Preceded by: Kevin Tanner

Personal details
- Born: William Solomon Wade; March 25, 1978 (age 48) Dawsonville, Georgia, U.S.
- Party: Republican
- Spouse: Jennifer Sheffield
- Education: North Georgia College and State University
- Website: Campaign website

William Solomon Wade (born March 25, 1978) is an American banker and politician from the State of Georgia. He is a Republican member of the Georgia House of Representatives for District 9. Wade served as a House floor leader for Governor Brian Kemp during the 2023-2024 session.

As the representative of the 9th state district, Wade serves portions of the counties Dawson, Lumpkin, and White. He also works as a bank executive within Dawson County.

On November 3, 2026, Wade was elected to the Georgia State Senate, succeeding Steve Gooch as the senator for the 51st district. He is set to assume office in January 2027.

== Personal life ==
Will Wade was born in Dawsonville, Georgia. He graduated from Dawson County High School and attended the North Georgia College and State University, earning a double major in finance and accounting in 2001.

Wade currently resides in Dawsonville with his wife, Dr. Jennifer Sheffield-Wade, and their two children. Jennifer serves as an educator for the Lumpkin County School District. Wade and his family are practicing Christians.

== Career ==
While enrolled in college, Wade worked as a full-time bank teller. Following his graduation, he worked as a community banker. He currently serves as the Commercial Banking Market Executive for Farm Bureau Bank, operating within Northwest Georgia.

Wade began his political career as a member of the Dawson County Board of Education, beginning in 2004. He was elected chairman of the board in 2011, and ultimately served 15 years. Wade has also served as president of the Georgia School Boards Association and in various leadership positions of the Dawson County Rotary Club. In 2017, he was recognized by Georgia Trend Magazine on their "40 Under 40" list.

== State government ==
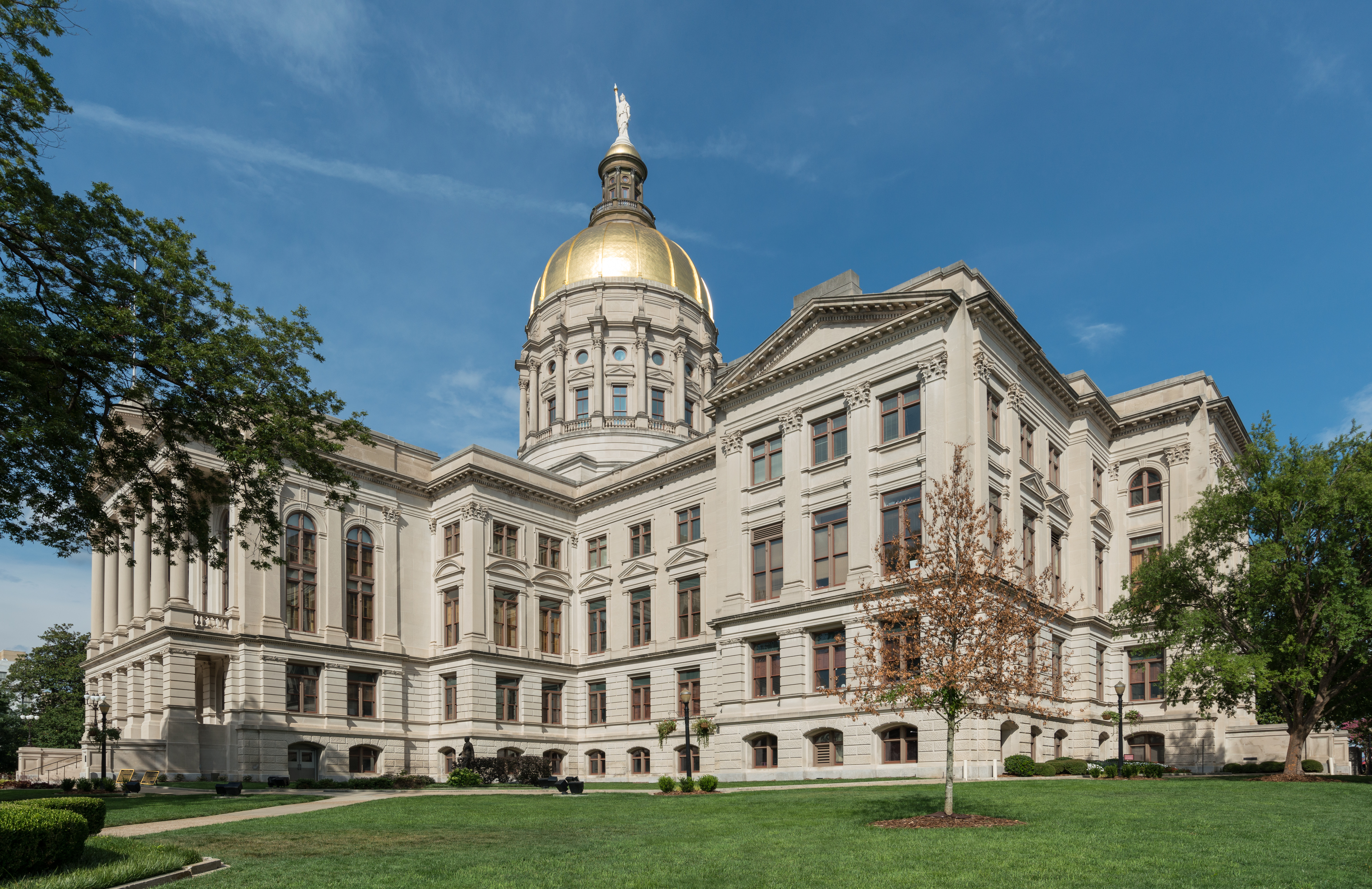
The Georgia State Capitol.

In 2019, Wade was appointed by Governor Kemp to serve on the Georgia Student Finance Commission. He worked closely with the Georgia Department of Education to provide funding for high school students to move to higher education. Wade's wife, Dr. Jennifer Sheffield-Wade, was simultaneously appointed to serve on the Georgia Professional Standards Commission. The board is tasked with overseeing the certification of Georgia educators.

In 2020, following incumbent Kevin Tanner's decision to run for the U.S. House of Representatives, Wade ran to fill his seat in the Georgia House of Representatives. His campaign emphasized protections for small business and education.

Wade was elected on November 3, 2020, winning 83.9% of the vote in the District 9 general election. He assumed office on January 11, 2021. Wade was later re-elected on November 8, 2022, running uncontested.

On January 19, 2023, Georgia Governor Brian Kemp selected Wade to serve as a floor leader for the 2023-2024 General Assembly. The primary duty of this position is to manage bills initiated or favored by Kemp.

On January 19, 2023, the Georgia House Committee on Assignments named Wade to serve as vice chairman of the Banks and Banking Committee.

On February 15, 2024, Wade was named the 2023 "Legislator of the Year" by the Georgia Baptist Mission Board.

In 2024, Wade ran unopposed to serve a third term. He was elected on November 5, 2024, and sworn in on January 11, 2025.

=== Legislation ===
During the 2021-2022 General Assembly, Wade sponsored House Bill 1084, seeking to prevent the teaching of "divisive concepts" in schools. A response to the emergence of critical race theory, the bill cites several examples that include teaching racial superiority, that the United States is fundamentally racist, individuals are inherently racist by virtue of skin color, and other similar concepts. The bill was signed into law by Governor Kemp in April 2022.

In the 2023-2024 session, Wade introduced House Bill 147, known as the "Safe Schools Act." The bill would require schools to conduct annual active-shooter drills, as well as submit safety plans to the Georgia Emergency Management Association. The bill was passed and signed into law by Governor Kemp in April 2023.

After it passed through the Georgia Senate, Wade also introduced Senate Bill 42 to the House Floor, a bipartisan bill designed to bring awareness to human trafficking. The bill aimed to "set minimum and maximum fines on certain businesses that are noncompliant in posting notice issued by the Georgia Bureau of Investigation that outlines the National Human Trafficking Resource Center phone number and the statewide Georgia Hotline for Human Trafficking phone number." The bill overwhelmingly passed and was signed into law by Governor Kemp in April 2023.

=== Committee assignments ===
For the 156th Georgia General Assembly:

- Banks and Banking
- Education
- State Planning and Community Affairs

For the 157th Georgia General Assembly:

- Governor's Floor Leaders
- Banks and Banking (vice chairman)
- Appropriations
- Education
- Juvenile Justice
- State Planning and Community Affairs

For the 158th Georgia General Assembly:

- Appropriations (vice chairman)
- Banks and Banking (vice chairman)
- Education
- Judiciary, Juvenile
- State Planning and Community Affairs
- Transportation

== Electoral history ==
Wade was first elected to the Georgia House on November 3, 2020, defeating Democrat Sharon Ravert with 83.9% of the vote. Wade was re-elected on November 8, 2022, and November 5, 2024.

Following State Senator Steve Gooch's campaign for Georgia lieutenant governor, Wade announced his candidacy for senator of the 51st district in 2025. Wade ran against political newcomers Steve Shaw and Philip Milam in the Republican primary, and advanced to the runoff election on May 19, 2026, with 42.7% of the vote. One June 16, 2026, Wade defeated Philip Milam in the runoff election with 61.2% of the vote.

Wade will run against Democrat Gary St. Lawrence in the general election on November 3, 2026.

== Gallery ==
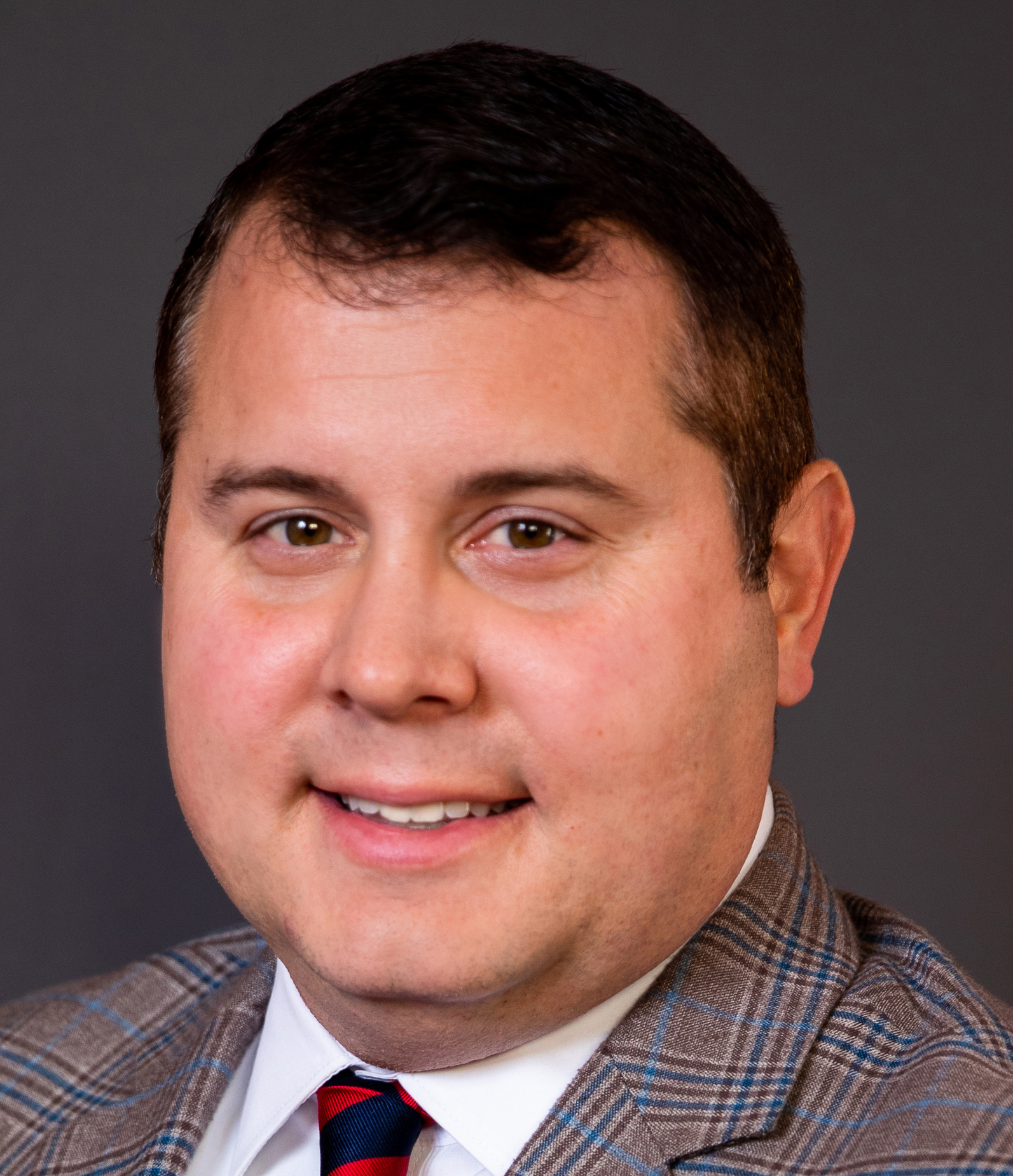
Official headshot of Georgia Representative Will Wade (2025-26 legislative session)
