= Kevin Tanner =

American politician

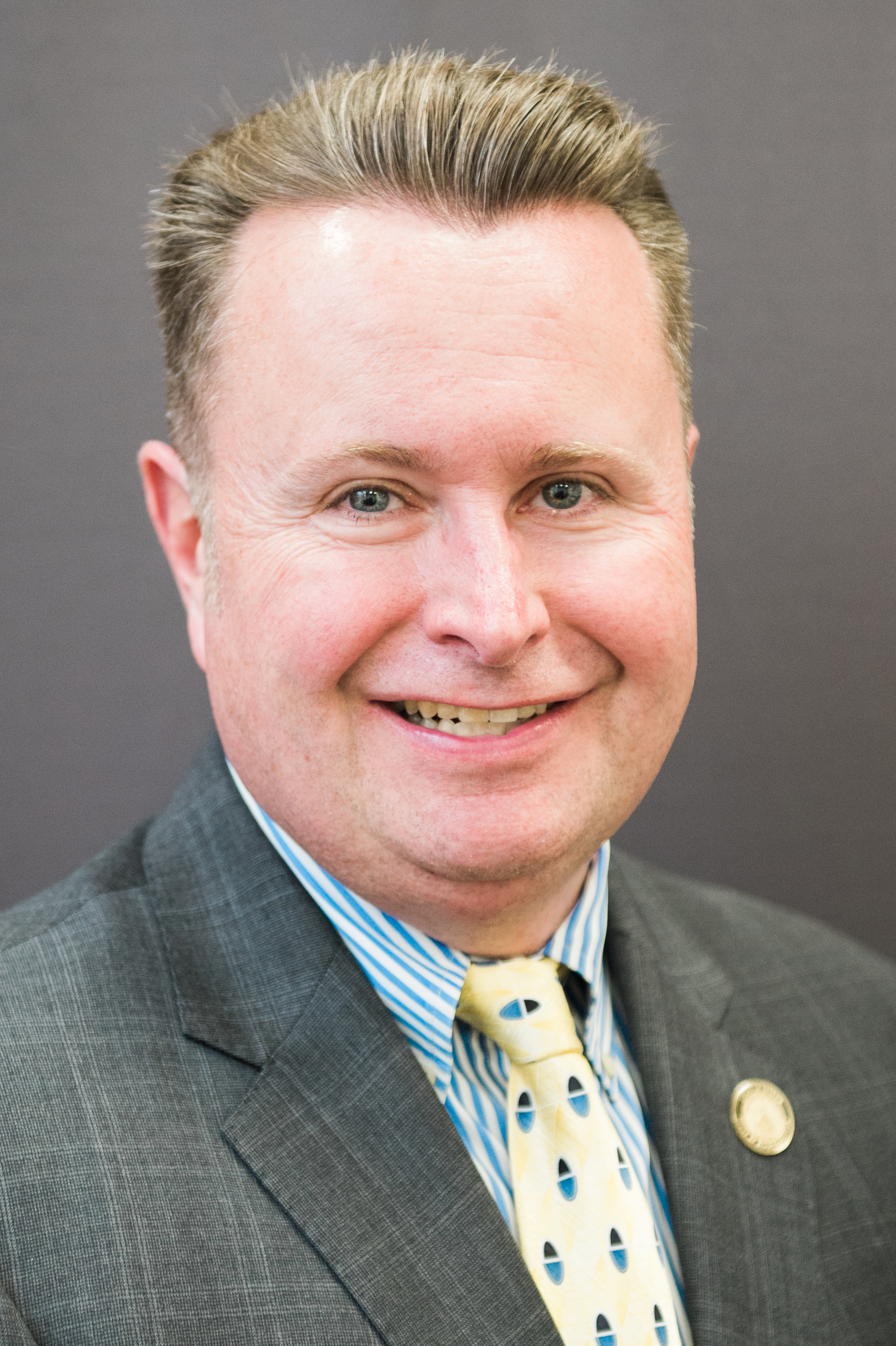
- House photo of Tanner in 2014

Commissioner of the Georgia Department of Behavioral Health and Developmental Disabilities
- Incumbent
- Assumed office December 16, 2022
- Governor: Brian Kemp
- Preceded by: Judy Fitzgerald

Member of the Georgia House of Representatives for the 9th District
- In office January 14, 2013 – January 11, 2021
- Preceded by: Amos Amerson
- Succeeded by: Will Wade

Personal details
- Born: February 10, 1972 (age 54)
- Party: Republican
- Spouse: Stacie
- Children: 4

Kevin Kermit Tanner (born February 10, 1972) is an American contractor and politician in Georgia. Tanner serves as the commissioner of the Georgia Department of Behavioral Health and Developmental Disabilities. He previously served as the District 9 member of the Georgia House of Representatives from 2013 to 2021.

== Career ==
Tanner previously served as a chief deputy sheriff and the Dawson County manager. In 2011 he was recognized as the "Appointed Official of the Year" by the Georgia Association of County Commissioners and appeared in Georgia Trend Magazine's 2007 "40 Under 40" list.

=== State House tenure ===
Tanner was sworn into the Georgia House on January 14, 2013.

In 2013, Tanner introduced legislation that would classify the identity of companies that supply execution drugs to Georgia as a "confidential state secret" so as to prevent any threats or harassment against the companies or their employees. The bill was enacted.

Tanner is anti-abortion, and voted in favor of the "fetal heartbeat bill" in the Georgia House. He voted for the purchase of new electronic voting machines for Georgia, in a measure that passed along a party-line vote, and claimed in 2019 that "the best way to rig or cheat in an election is paper ballots."

In 2015, Tanner was the sponsor of legislation that would restrict police from using "no-knock warrants" at nighttime (between 10 p.m. and 6 a.m.) in most circumstances.

In 2016, Tanner sponsored legislation to regulate the use of unmanned aircraft systems (drones) in Georgia.

In 2016, Tanner was the lead sponsor of legislation to allow businesses to refuse services to same-sex couples on the basis of religious beliefs.

In the House, Tanner served as chairman of the Transportation Committee, at a time when transportation issues became high-profile in Georgia.

In 2018 and 2019, Tanner proposed a rural transportation bill. The legislation passed the House overwhelmingly, but died in the Senate amid opposition from the Georgia Department of Transportation, which objected to the portions of the bill that would have consolidated state transit operations.

In March 2019, Tanner and House members passed a measure to establishing a legislative oversight committee to monitor the operations of Hartsfield–Jackson Atlanta International Airport and Georgia's other commercial airports. The legislation was a milder version of a more controversial state Senate bill, which would have implemented a state takeover of Hartsfield–Jackson Airport. The House legislation, which passed 104–70, also included a jet fuel tax break for airlines and a rural transportation package.

=== 2020 congressional campaign ===
In 2020, Tanner officially announced his candidacy for the Republican nomination for Congress in Georgia's 9th congressional district, for the seat vacated by Republican U.S. Representative Doug Collins, who ran for U.S. Senate.

The congressional district is a Republican safe seat. Tanner ran against former Representative Paul Broun, State Senator John Wilkinson, State Representative Matt Gurtler, and business owner Andrew Clyde in the Republican primary. Tanner, like the other candidates for the Republican nomination, ran on a conservative, pro-Donald Trump message. He vowed to combat what he asserted to be "attempts to overthrow an election through this impeachment nonsense, socialists running for president, a resistance to support President Trump in building the wall, and Nancy Pelosi and the Socialist Squad trying to destroy our values." Tanner's candidacy was backed by influential Georgia Republicans, including former Governor Nathan Deal and allies of Governor Brian Kemp.

=== Term as commissioner ===
Following Andrew Clyde's Republican nomination and eventual election to the U.S. House, Tanner left the Georgia House of Representatives. On December 22, 2021, Tanner was selected by the Forsyth County Board of Commissioners to serve as the county manager. Tanner began this role on January 11, 2021.

Following Governor Kemp's election to a second term, Tanner was selected to serve as the commissioner of the Department of Behavioral Health and Developmental Disorders. The DBHDD currently serves as the primary government agency for all mental health services in the state. Tanner began this role in December 2022.

== Personal life ==
Tanner's wife is Stacie Tanner. They have four children. Tanner and his family live in Dawsonville, Georgia.
