= Carter Barrett =

American politician from Georgia

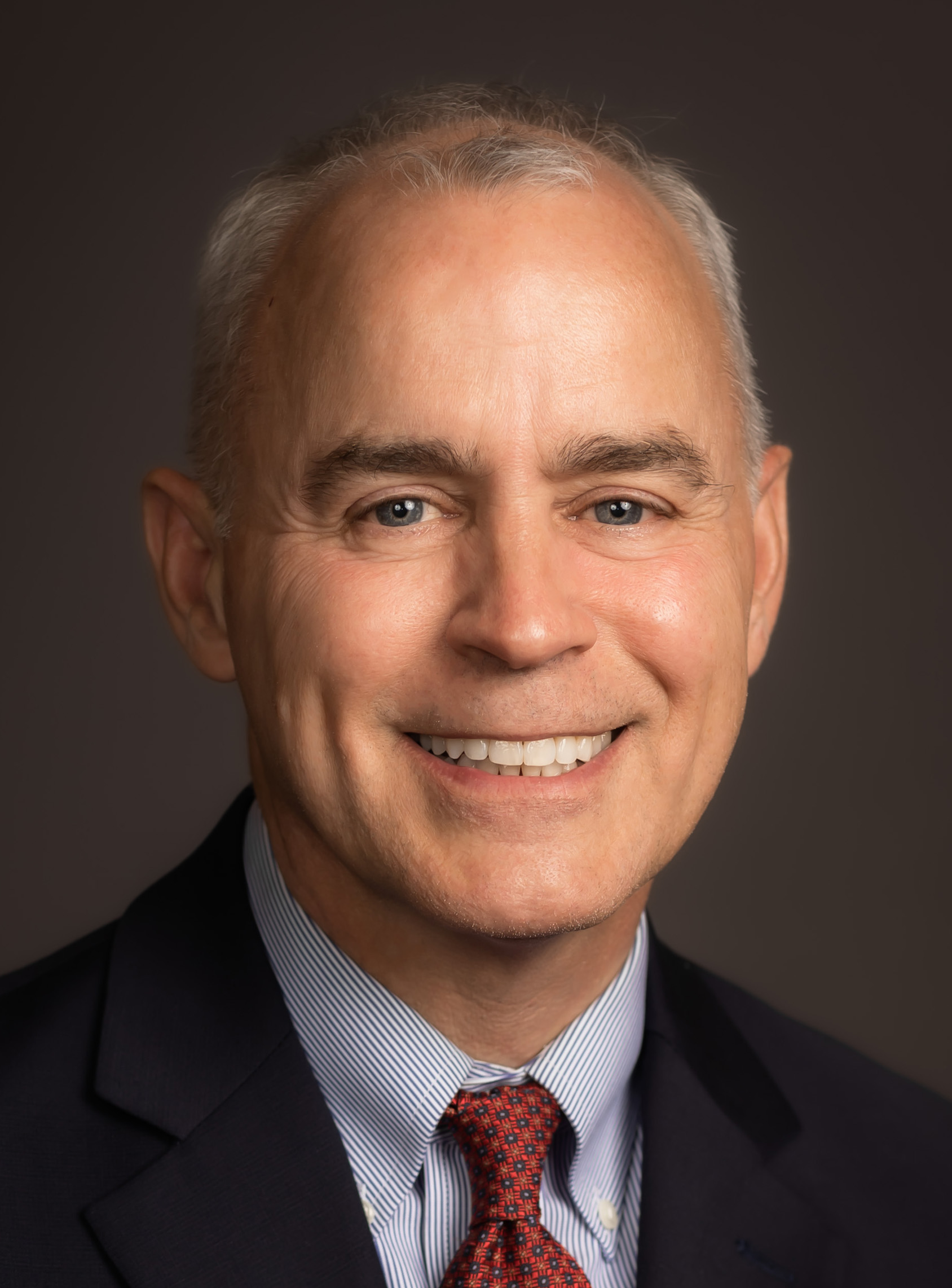

Member of the Georgia House of Representatives from the 24th district
- Incumbent
- Assumed office January 9, 2023
- Preceded by: Sheri Gilligan

Personal details
- Born: June 27
- Party: Republican
- Education: University of Georgia (BBA, finance)
- Occupation: Politician, banker

John Carter Barrett born June 27) is an American Republican politician from Georgia, currently representing the 24th district in the Georgia House of Representatives.

== Education ==
Barrett attended high school in Rome, Italy, and he graduated from the University of Georgia with a BBA in finance.

== Career and politics ==
Originally from Augusta, Barrett moved to Cumming in 1990 working as a banker for Wachovia. He co-founded Forsyth, Georgia-based Community Business Bank in 2008, before selling it to Community and Southern Bank in 2015. He later worked for Affinity Bank. Barrett is on the board of directors of Forsyth County Chamber.

Barrett is opposed to abortion.

In 2022, Barrett defeated incumbent Sheri Gilligan in the primary following a runoff; Gilligan previously opposed aspects of then-Speaker David Ralston's mental health bill, and Ralston's campaign committee supported Barrett, helping him to raise over $280,000. He went on to defeat Democratic challenger Sydney Walker in November 2022.

In an interview in 2022, Barrett said the 24th House district is "the only political office I ever intend to run for." The Coalition of Advocates for Georgia's Elderly honored Barrett as 2023 Outstanding Legislator of the Year.

=== Elections ===
General election results for Georgia House of Representatives district 24, 2022
Party	Candidate	Votes	%
Republican	Carter Barrett	15,593	67.22
Democratic	Sydney Walker	7,604	32.78
Total votes		23,197	100.00
Republican hold			

Primary election runoff results for Georgia House of Representatives district 24, 2022
Party	Candidate	Votes	%
Republican	Carter Barrett	2,317	58.79
Republican	Sheri Gilligan	1,624	41.21
Total votes		3,941	100.00

==== Primary and general elections, 2022 ====
Primary election results for Georgia House of Representatives district 24, 2022
Party	Candidate	Votes	%
Republican	Carter Barrett	3,418	42.02
Republican	Sheri Gilligan	4,042	49.69
Republican	Ed Solly	675	8.30
Total votes		8,135	100.00

== Personal life ==
Barrett lives in Cumming, Georgia with his wife Jamie; they were married in 1995 and have two daughters.
