= Benjamin Bridges =

American politician (1940–2022)

Benjamin D. Bridges Sr.

Member of the Georgia House of Representatives from the 10th district
- In office 1997–2008
- Succeeded by: Rick Austin

Personal details
- Born: August 30, 1940 Ila, Georgia, U.S.
- Died: September 1, 2022 (aged 82) Hall County, Georgia, U.S.
- Party: Republican
- Spouse: Jeanie Bridges
- Children: 5

Benjamin D. Bridges Sr. (August 30, 1940 – September 1, 2022) was a former Republican politician and one-time member of the Georgia House of Representatives. Bridges represented Georgia's 9th (1997–2001), then 7th (2001–2003), and then 10th (2003–2009) districts, based about the city of Cleveland, between 1997 and 2009. He was chairman of the House Retirement Committee and was replaced as the 10th district's representative by fellow Republican Rick Austin in 2008.

== Early life and career ==
Born on August 30, 1940, Bridges graduated from high school in 1959 and received a barber license in 1960. He worked as a barber for six years before joining the Georgia State Patrol in 1966. He retired in 1995 with the rank of captain.

== Political career ==
He was elected to the Georgia House of Representatives in 1997.

=== 2007 anti-evolution/heliocentrism controversy ===
In February 2007, Bridges was criticized by the Anti-Defamation League and others for circulating a memo condemning evolution and heliocentrism in the Georgia legislature. The memo claimed that:

Indisputable evidence – long hidden but now available to everyone – demonstrates conclusively that so-called 'secular evolution science' is the Big-Bang 15-billion-year alternate 'creation scenario' of the Pharisee Religion...This scenario is derived concept-for-concept from Rabbinic writings in the mystic 'holy book' Kabbala dating back at least two millennia.

The memo also directed readers to the website of the young Earth creationist Fair Education Foundation, which claims the Earth is not rotating or orbiting the Sun, and denies the existence of any stars or exoplanets outside the Solar System. Marshall Hall (1931–2013), the memo's author and the founder of the Fair Education Foundation, was the husband of Bridges' longtime campaign manager, Bonnie Hall.

Bridges claimed he had nothing to do with the memo, but Hall stated that he had Bridges' approval. Bridges said he did not necessarily disagree with Hall's viewpoint; he was quoted as saying, "I agree with it more than I would the Big Bang Theory or the Darwin Theory". Bridges' memo was later circulated in the Texas legislature by the conservative Republican Warren Chisum of Pampa, the seat of Gray County in the Texas Panhandle.

He served in the House until 2008.
