= Terry Rogers =

Terry Rogers may refer to:

- Terry Rogers (Australian politician)
- Terry Rogers (American politician)
