= Tom Dickson (Georgia politician) =

American politician

Member of the Georgia House of Representatives from the 6th district
- In office January 10, 2005 – January 9, 2017
- Preceded by: David Ralston
- Succeeded by: Jason Ridley

Personal details
- Born: September 22, 1945 (age 80) Paradise, Pennsylvania, U.S.
- Party: Republican

Tom Dickson (born September 22, 1945) is an American politician. He is a former member of the Georgia House of Representatives from the 6th District, serving from 2005 to 2017. He is a member of the Republican party. He appeared in the 2011 film Bully after one of his constituents, 17-year-old Tyler Long, committed suicide.
