= Johnny Chastain =

Georgia politician and banker

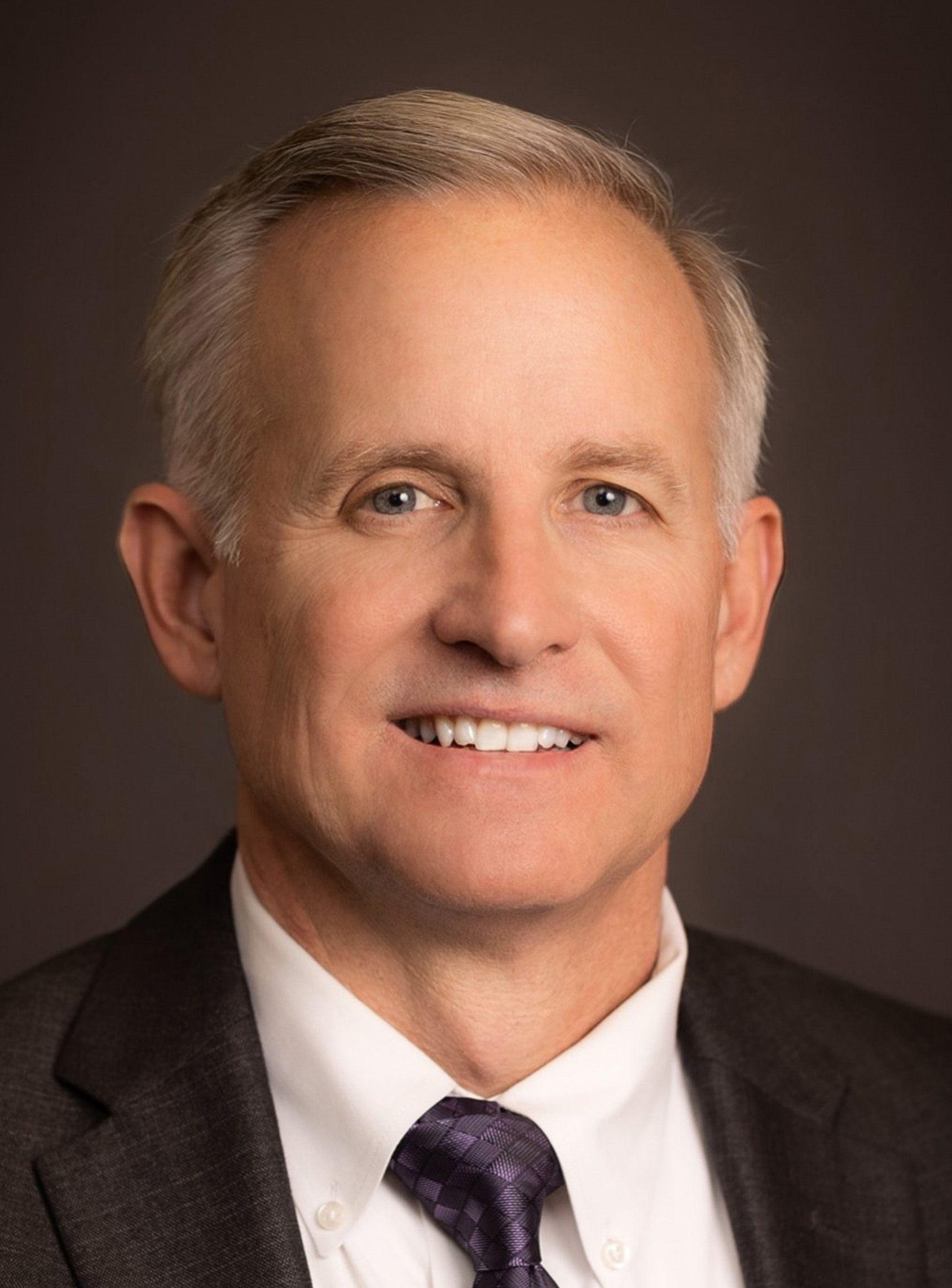
- Official portrait, 2025

Member of the Georgia House of Representatives from the 7th district
- Incumbent
- Assumed office February 6, 2023
- Preceded by: David Ralston

Personal details
- Occupation: Banker

John "Johnny" Wayne Chastain Jr. is an American politician and banker. He currently represents the 7th district in the Georgia House of Representatives.

== Career ==
Before running for office, Chastain was a banker. He served as an executive of United Community Bank.

=== Politics ===
Chastain entered the special election for the 7th district after the death of incumbent representative (and Speaker of the House) David Ralston. In the first round, Chastain placed second out of five candidates. He faced Ralston's widow Sheree in the runoff. Chastain narrowly defeated her in the runoff. Observers considered his victory an upset, as Ralston had the backing of several prominent leaders, including governor Brian Kemp.

== Electoral history ==
2023 special election for Georgia House of Representatives, District 7
Party	Candidate	Votes	%
Republican	Sheree Ralston	3,582	45
Republican	Johnny Chastain	3,125	39
Republican	Justin Heitman	590	7
Republican	Brian Pritchard	490	6
Republican	Richie Stone	169	2
Total votes		7,956	100
General election
Republican	Johnny Chastain	4,565	52.8
Republican	Sheree Ralston	4,085	47.2
Total votes		8,650	100
