= Georgia's 6th House of Representatives district =

State district in Georgia, USA

Georgia's 6th State House of Representatives district
Representative
Jason Ridley; R–Chatsworth
- Demographics: 73.3% White; 1.7% Black; 23.0% Hispanic; 0.8% Asian
- Population: 55,614

District 6 elects one member of the Georgia House of Representatives. It contains the entirety of Murray County as well as parts of Gordon County and Whitfield County.

== Members ==
- David Ralston (2003–2005)
- Tom Dickson (2005–2017)
- Jason Ridley (since 2017)
