= Victor Anderson (Georgia politician) =

American politician

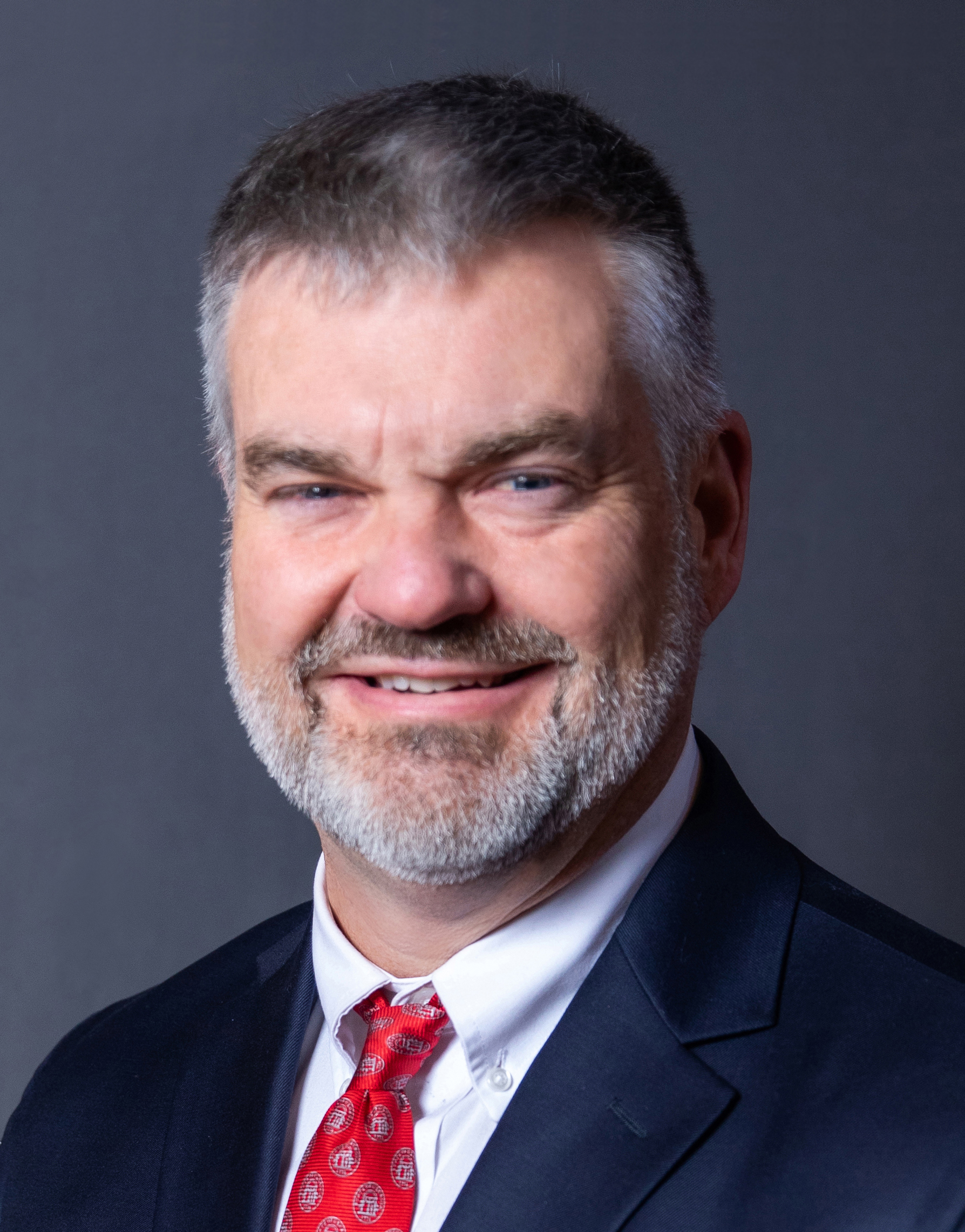

Member of the Georgia House of Representatives from the 10th district
- Incumbent
- Assumed office January 11, 2021
- Preceded by: Terry Rogers

Personal details
- Born: February 21, 1967 (age 59)
- Party: Republican
- Spouse: Kimberly
- Education: Georgia Tech

Victor Edward Anderson (born February 21, 1967) is an American politician from Georgia. Anderson is a Republican member of Georgia House of Representatives for District 10.
