= Mike Dudgeon =

American politician

Member of the Georgia House of Representatives from the 25th district
- In office January 14, 2013 – January 9, 2017
- Preceded by: Emory Dunahoo
- Succeeded by: Todd Jones

Member of the Georgia House of Representatives from the 24th district
- In office January 10, 2011 – January 14, 2013
- Preceded by: Tom Knox
- Succeeded by: Mark Hamilton

Personal details
- Born: December 6, 1967 (age 58)
- Party: Republican

Mike Dudgeon (born December 6, 1967) is an American politician who served in the Georgia House of Representatives from 2011 to 2017.
