= Matt Gurtler =

American politician

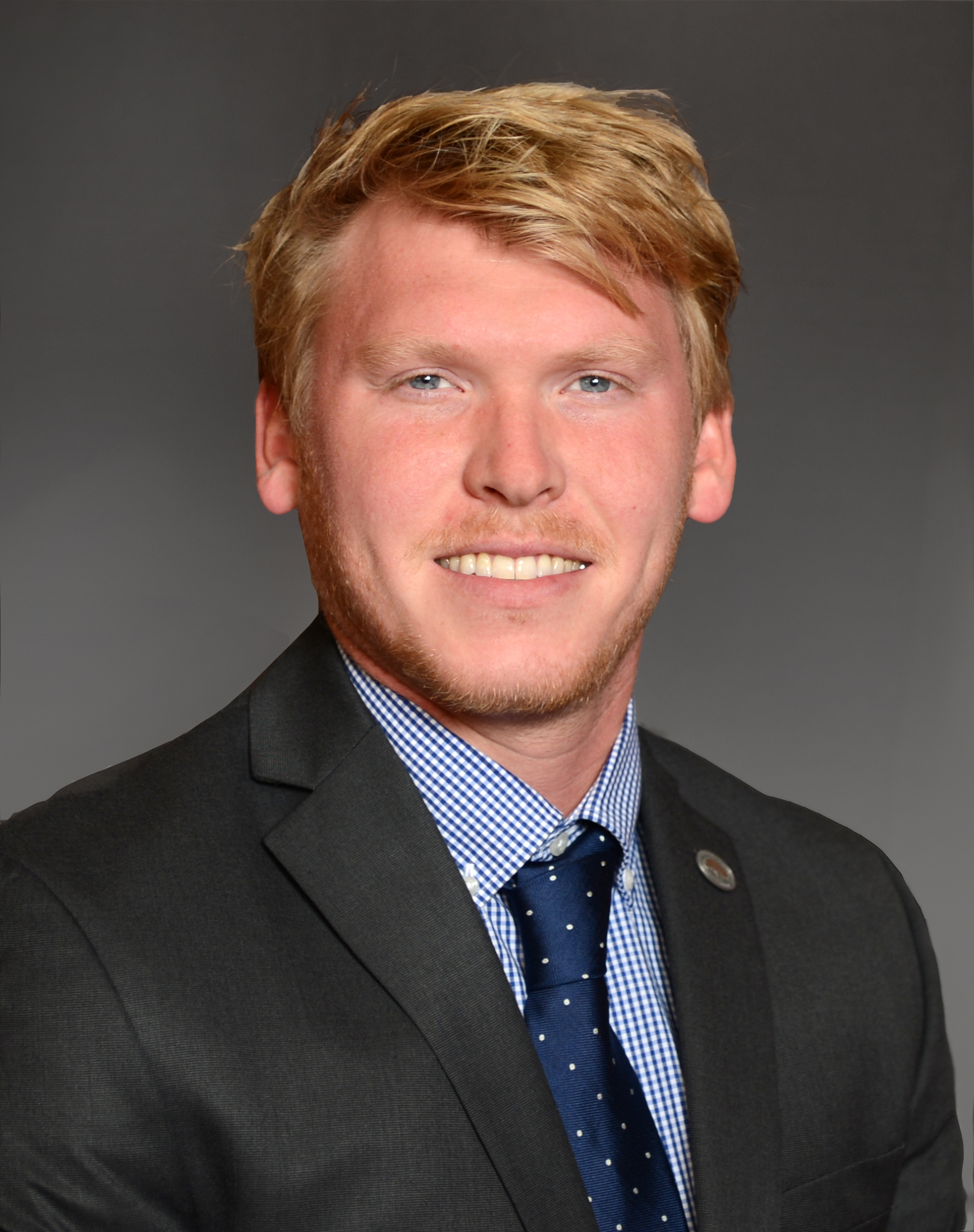

Member of the Georgia House of Representatives from the 8th district
- In office January 9, 2017 – January 11, 2021
- Preceded by: Stephen Allison
- Succeeded by: Stan Gunter

Personal details
- Born: Matthew Levi Gurtler; September 15
- Party: Republican
- Spouse: Marissa Solis
- Children: 1
- Education: University of North Georgia (BA)

Matthew Levi Gurtler is an American politician who served as a member of the Georgia House of Representatives from the 8th district from 2017 to 2021. A Republican, he unsuccessfully sought the Republican nomination for the U.S. House of Representatives seat for Georgia's 9th congressional district in the 2020 election.

== Early life and education ==
Gurtler graduated from the University of North Georgia with a Bachelor of Arts in 2012. He participated in R.O.T.C. and received a history degree. In 2013, he was arrested on the North Georgia College and State University campus in Dahlonega and charged with obstructing a police officer. The charges were settled four years later after Gurtler completed a pretrial diversion program and paid court costs.

== Career before House tenure ==
Gurtler has been a general contractor.

Gurtler volunteered for Ron Paul's 2008 and 2012 campaigns for president, and served as a delegate to the Georgia Republican Party in 2013 and 2015. Gurtler was a political consultant since 2015 and was CEO of Matthew L. Gurtler General Construction.

== Georgia House of Representatives ==
=== 2016 election ===
In 2016, Gurtler ran to succeed state Rep. Steve Allison in District 8, to whom he served as an aide. He won the Republican primary runoff with 61 percent of the vote and was unopposed in the general election.

=== Tenure and positions ===
Gurtler described himself as a both a "limited government conservative" and a supporter of "President Trump's agenda." He was regarded as a hardliner within the Republican Party, with an "anti-establishment" message. Gurtler "has a reputation in the House as often being the lone Republican dissenter on many of the party-backed initiatives, making him a bit of a pariah in his own caucus." As a frequent sole dissenter, Gurtler was termed "the Dr. No of the House." In 2017–18, Gurtler voted "no" in 40% of floor votes, more than any member of any party in the General Assembly.

In early 2018, Gurtler voted against legislation for a commuter rail system in metro Atlanta and for an expansion of broadband access in rural communities. During a fall 2018 special session of the General Assembly, Gurtler was criticized by fellow Republicans for being the sole representative to vote against a $500 million emergency relief package for communities in southwest Georgia impacted by Hurricane Michael. Gurtler termed the legislation "not in line with conservative principles"; in response, 20 lawmakers sent a letter to newspaper editors in Gurtler's district accusing him of failing to “work constructively on anything to help Georgians – your district included."

Gurtler was the sole House member to vote against the proposed budget of Governor Nathan Deal (who also is a Republican). In February 2017, Gurtler had a dispute with Deal's chief of staff, Chris Riley, at a breakfast event at the Governor's Mansion, regarding the state budget. Following the exchange, Gurtler accused Riley of "intimidation and bullying tactics" and claimed that Riley had threatened to "cut all funding" to Gurtler's district unless he voted for the budget. Riley denied Gurtler's allegation.

Gurtler introduced legislation to eliminate the state's permit requirement for the carrying of concealed handguns, HB 2. Gurtler's permitless carry legislation was supported by Republican Brian Kemp, the Georgia governor. Gurtler said that he regarded the Second Amendment to the United States Constitution as "a no-compromise statement." In 2018, Gurtler introduced a resolution urging Georgia school districts to arm teachers and school staff; the resolution did not receive a vote.

In March 2020, Gurtler was the sole House member to vote against a measure to regulate pharmacy benefits managers, who negotiate prescription drug prices between health insurers and pharmacies, the measure passed 165–1. In a March 2020 special session calling to declare a state public health emergency due to the coronavirus pandemic in Georgia, Gurtler was the sole House member to vote "no"; the measure passed 142–1. During the crisis, Gurtler also called for laws requiring a permit to carry a concealed weapon to be suspended, so that persons in Georgia would be entitled to carry weapons (either concealed or openly) without a license.

=== 2018 reelection ===
In the 2018 election, Republican party leadership (including Governor Nathan Deal and state House speaker David Ralston) supported Gurtler's primary challenger, farmers' market manager Mickey Cumming, in a rare example of party leadership seeking to unseat an incumbent of their own party. Gurtler nevertheless secured renomination, defeating Cummings with 60 percent of the vote. He did not have a Democratic challenger in the general election.

== 2020 U.S. House election ==
In February 2020, Gurtler announced his candidacy for the Republican nomination for Congress in Georgia's 9th congressional district, for the seat vacated by Republican U.S. Representative Doug Collins, who ran in the 2020–21 United States Senate special election in Georgia. The congressional district is a Republican safe seat.

During his 2020 campaign, Gurtler said he supports the repeal of the Affordable Care Act and a rollback of U.S. Food and Drug Administration regulations. He opposed federal efforts to address climate change. He called for "states with sanctuary cities and loose voting laws" to be "completely defunded." He expressed support for the First Step Act. He accused "elites like Hillary Clinton" of "violating the Constitution."

In the Republican primary, Gurtler ran against former representative Paul Broun, State Senator John Wilkinson, State Representative Kevin Tanner, and Athens gun shop owner Andrew Clyde. All the candidates emphasized their right-wing credentials. During his campaign, Gurtler posed with a photo at an event with a longtime Georgia white supremacist and far-right activist associated with the National Alliance and Hammerskins; Gurtler was criticized by his primary opponents and others across the political spectrum. In the primary, Gurtler and Clyde gained the most votes, advancing to a Republican primary runoff election. Clyde defeated Gurtler in the runoff election on August 11 to win the Republican nomination.

== Electoral history ==
Georgia House District 8 Republican primary, 2016
Party	Candidate	Votes	%
Republican	Matt Gurtler	4,016	34.64
Republican	Kent Woerner	2,621	22.61
Republican	Joshua Littrell	2,602	22.45
Republican	David Barton	2,354	20.31
Total votes		11,593	100.00

Georgia House District 8 Republican primary runoff, 2016
Party	Candidate	Votes	%
Republican	Matt Gurtler	3,476	60.84
Republican	Kent Woerner	2,237	39.16
Total votes		5,713	100.00

Georgia House District 8 election, 2016
Party	Candidate	Votes	%
Republican	Matt Gurtler	24,824	100.00
Total votes		24,824	100.00

Georgia House District 8 Republican primary, 2018
Party	Candidate	Votes	%
Republican	Matt Gurtler	5,971	60.19
Republican	Mickey Cummings	3,950	39.82
Total votes		9,921	100.00

Georgia's 9th Congressional district primary (2020)
Party	Candidate	Votes	%
Republican	Matt Gurtler	29,426	21.0
Republican	Andrew Clyde	25,914	18.5
Republican	Kevin Tanner	22,187	15.8
Republican	Paul Broun	18,627	13.3
Republican	John Wilkinson	16,314	11.6
Republican	Ethan Underwood	12,117	8.6
Republican	Kellie Weeks	6,422	4.6
Republican	Maria Strickland	4,871	3.5
Republican	Michael Boggus	4,497	3.2
Total votes		140,375	100.0

== Post Georgia House of Representatives ==
Since January 2021, Gurtler has worked as the Chief of Staff to US Congressman Thomas Massie.

== Personal life ==
Gurtler's wife is Marissa Solis. They have a daughter.
