= Georgia's 25th House of Representatives district =

State district in Georgia, USA

Georgia's 25th State House of Representatives district
Representative
Todd Jones; R–Cumming
- Demographics: 66.4% White; 4.4% Black; 6.5% Hispanic; 20.4% Asian
- Population: 64,808

District 25 elects one member of the Georgia House of Representatives. It contains parts of Forsyth County.

== Members ==
- Mike Dudgeon (2013–2017)
- Todd Jones (since 2017)
