= Todd Jones (politician) =

American politician

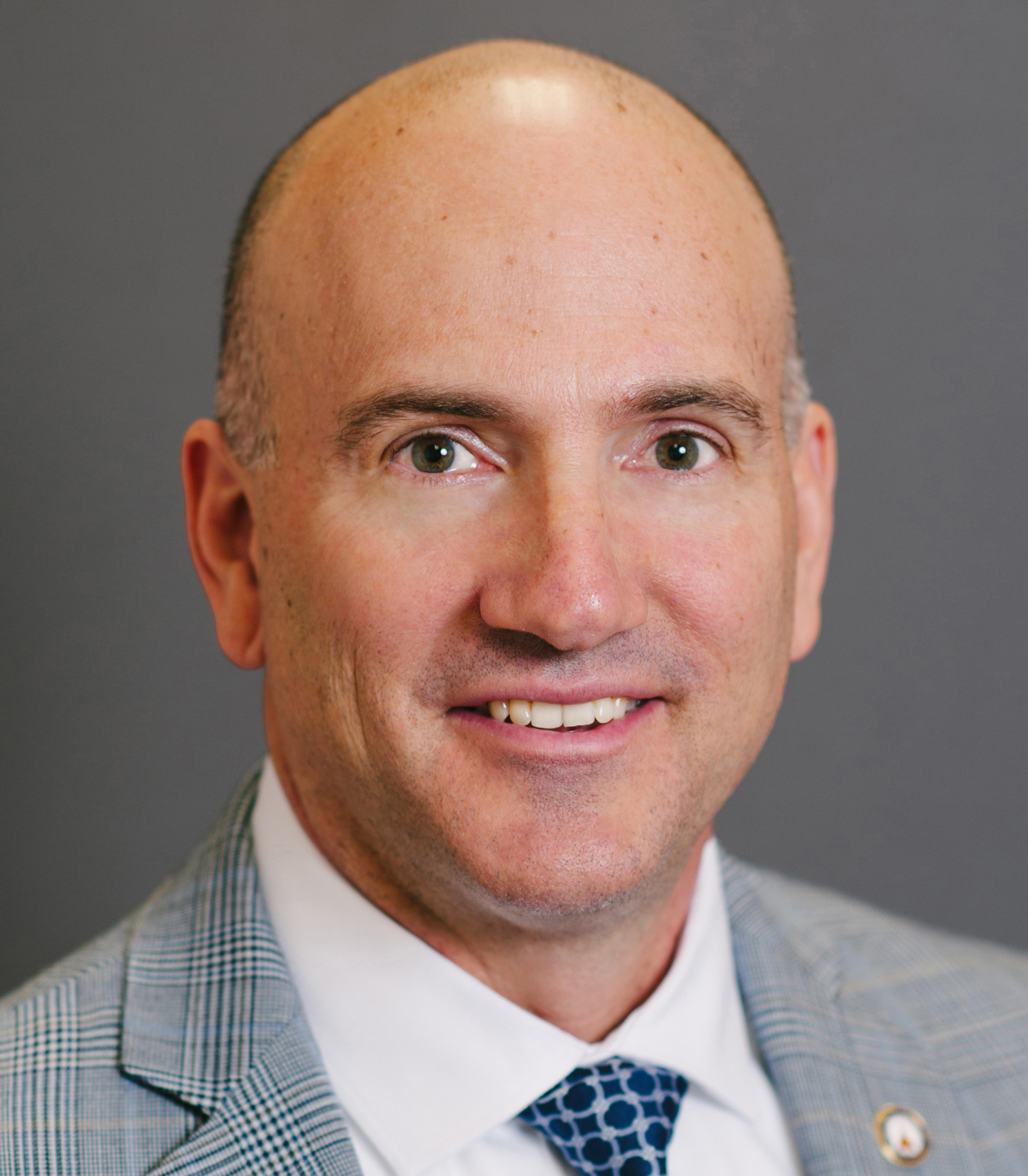

Member of the Georgia House of Representatives from the 25th district
- Incumbent
- Assumed office January 9, 2017
- Preceded by: Mike Dudgeon

Personal details
- Born: Todd Jones; August 15, 1967 (age 59)
- Party: Republican
- Spouse: Tracey
- Children: Four
- Website: www.jonesfor.us

Robert Todd Jones (born August 15, 1967) is an American politician from Georgia. Jones is a Republican member of the Georgia House of Representatives for District 25.

== Gallery ==
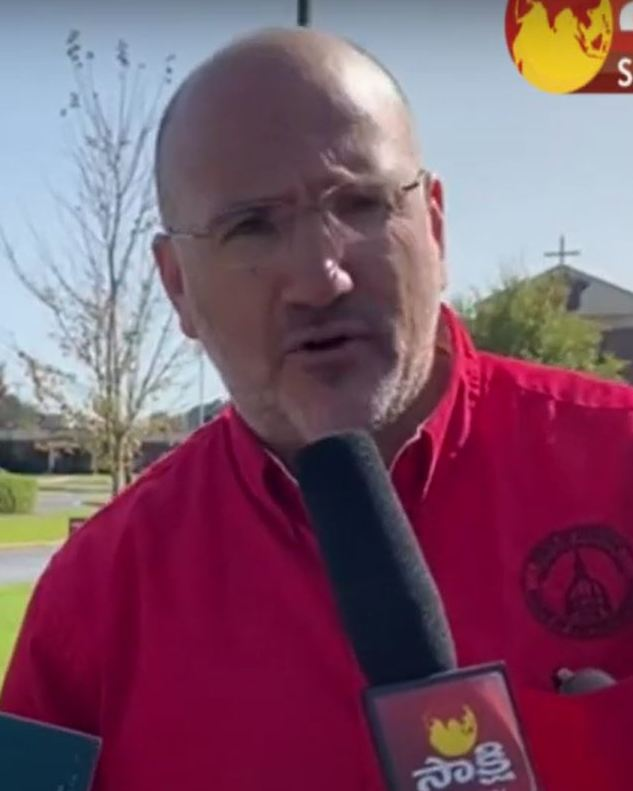
Exclusive interview with Todd Jones Georgia House of Representatives
