= Georgia's 24th House of Representatives district =

State district in Georgia, USA

Georgia's 24th State House of Representatives district
Representative
Carter Barrett; R–Cumming
- Demographics: 79.7% White; 3.0% Black; 10.4% Hispanic; 5.3% Asian
- Population: 62,274

District 24 elects one member of the Georgia House of Representatives. It contains parts of Forsyth County.

== Members ==
- Tom Knox (until 2011)
- Mike Dudgeon (2011–2013)
- Mark Hamilton (2013–2015)
- Sheri Gilligan (2015–2023)
- Carter Barrett (since 2023)
