= Mark Hamilton (politician) =

American politician

Member of the Georgia House of Representatives from the 24th district
- In office January 14, 2013 – May 11, 2015
- Preceded by: Mike Dudgeon
- Succeeded by: Sheri Gilligan

Member of the Georgia House of Representatives from the 23rd district
- In office January 8, 2007 – January 14, 2013
- Preceded by: Jack Murphy
- Succeeded by: Mandi Ballinger

Personal details
- Born: April 21, 1956 (age 70)
- Party: Republican

Mark Hamilton (born April 21, 1956) is an American politician who served in the Georgia House of Representatives from 2007 to 2015.
