= Jason Ridley =

American politician (born 1977)

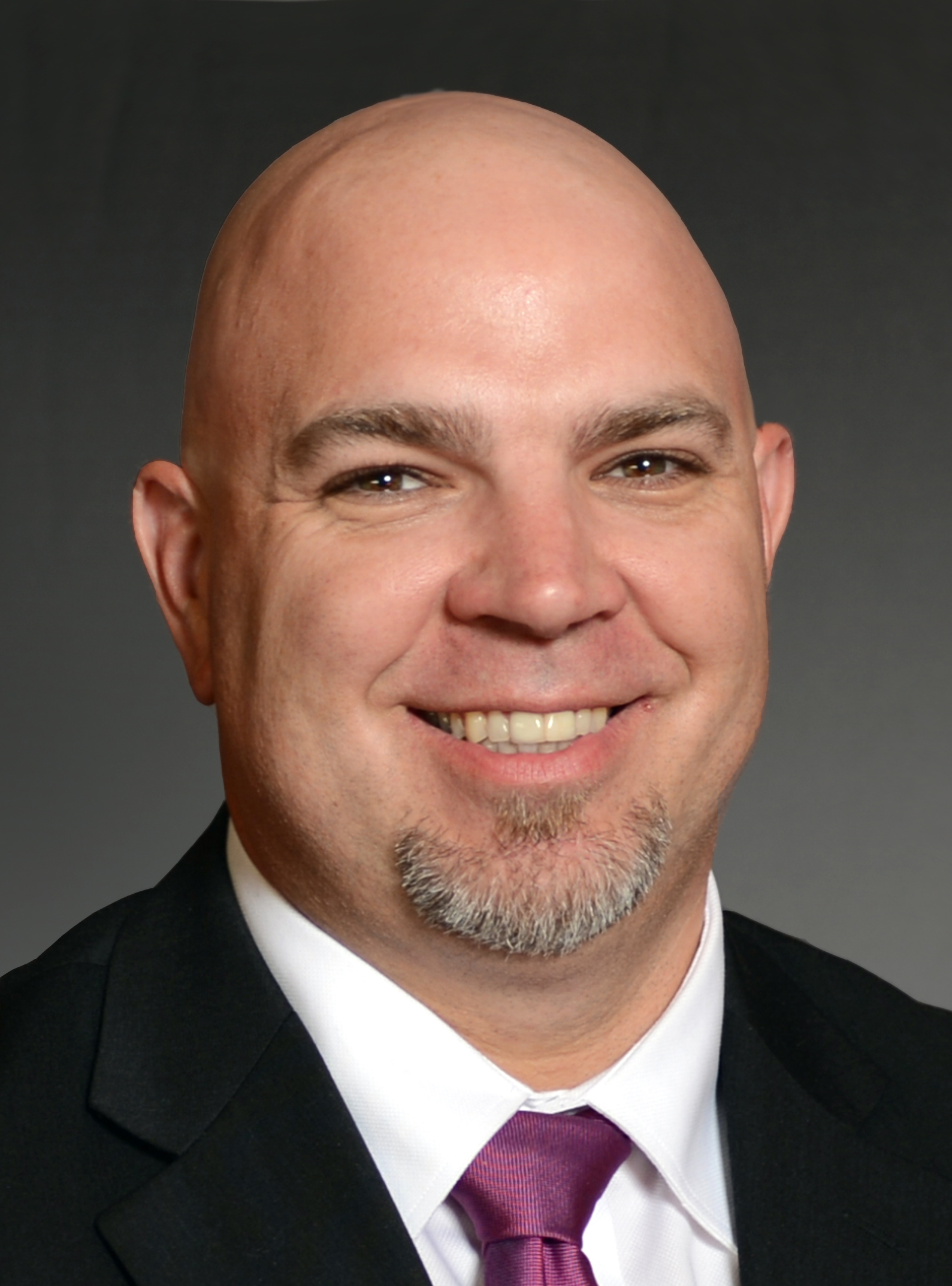

Member of the Georgia House of Representatives from the 6th district
- Incumbent
- Assumed office January 9, 2017
- Preceded by: Tom Dickson

Personal details
- Born: Jason Thomas Ridley; July 19, 1977 (age 49)
- Party: Republican
- Spouse: Andrea
- Occupation: Farmer/real estate

Jason Thomas Ridley (born July 19, 1977) is an American politician from Georgia. Ridley is a Republican member of the Georgia House of Representatives for District 6.
