= Stan Gunter =

American politician and judge

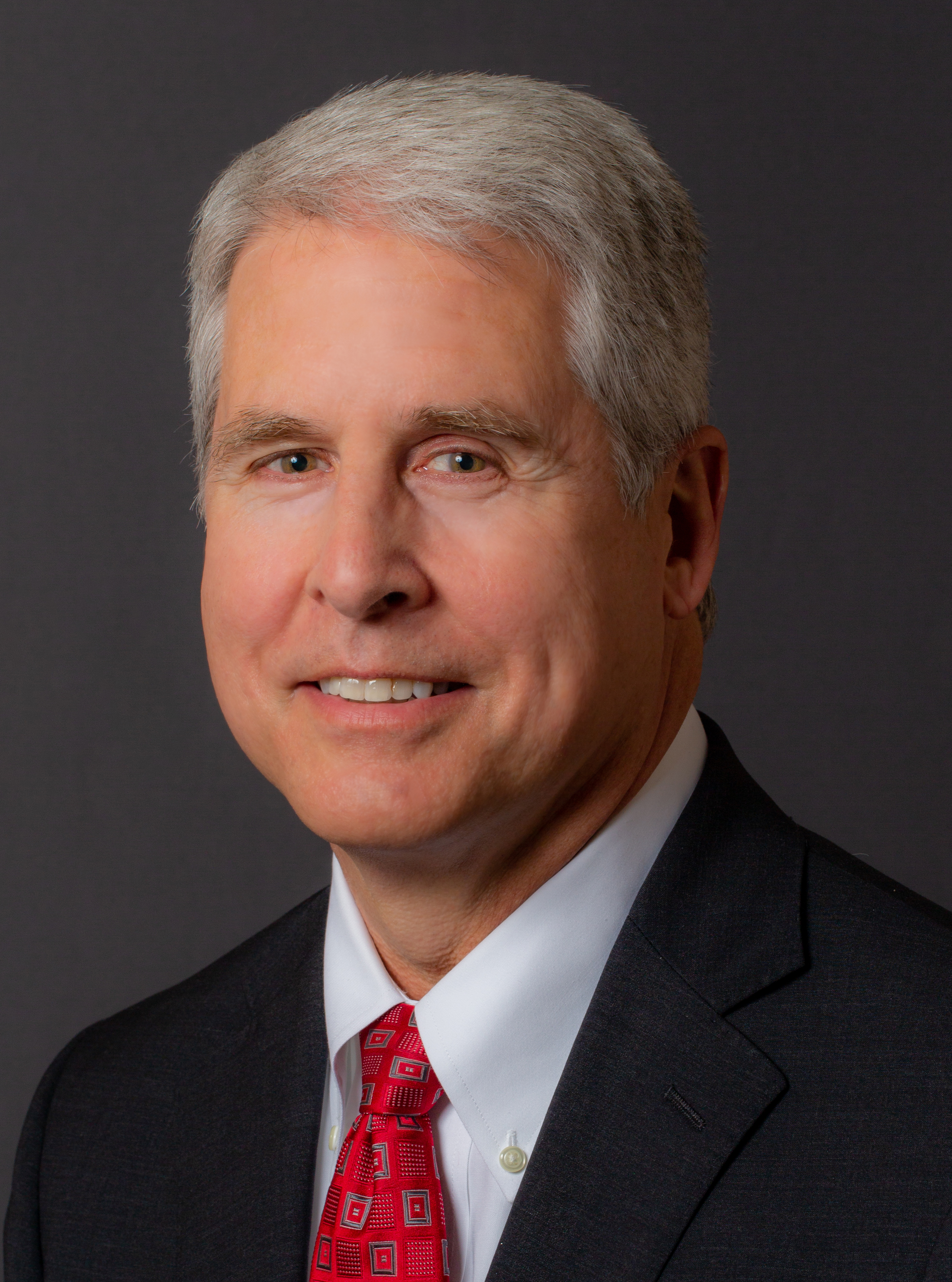

Member of the Georgia House of Representatives from the 8th district
- Incumbent
- Assumed office January 11, 2021
- Preceded by: Matt Gurtler

Judge of the Georgia Superior Court for the Enotah Circuit
- In office May 2012 – September 30, 2019
- Preceded by: Lynn Akeley-Alderman
- Succeeded by: T. Buckley “Buck” Levins

District Attorney of Lumpkin, Towns, Union, and White Counties
- In office 1998–2010
- Succeeded by: Jeff Langley

Personal details
- Born: Norman Stanley Gunter; May 25, 1959 (age 67)
- Party: Republican
- Spouse: Rita
- Education: North Georgia College; Woodrow Wilson College of Law

Norman Stanley Gunter (born May 25, 1959) is an American politician currently serving as a member of the Georgia House of Representatives. He represents District 8, which includes Union, Towns, and parts of White county in northeastern Georgia.

Gunter is a member of the Republican Party and currently serves as chairman of the House Judiciary Committee.

== Early life and education ==
Stan Gunter was born on May 25, 1959. He grew up in Habersham County and graduated from Habersham Central High School in Mount Airy. Gunter attended North Georgia College (now the University of North Georgia) and graduated with a bachelor's degree in chemistry. He then earned his Juris Doctor from the unaccredited Woodrow Wilson College of Law.

== Career ==
In college, Gunter worked for the United States Department of Agriculture. After graduation, he began a private law practice specializing in real estate law and litigation. In 1998, Gunter was elected District Attorney of the Enotah Circuit, which includes Lumpkin, Towns, Union, White counties. He served for 12 years. While District Attorney, Gunter served as president of the Georgia District Attorneys’ Association from 2003 to 2004.

In 2010, he ran for a seat on the Georgia Court of Appeals, but lost. In 2012, he was appointed as a Georgia Superior Court judge in the Enotah Circuit by Governor Nathan Deal. In 2013, he created a successful drug court for the circuit. He retired in September 2019.

=== Georgia House of Representatives ===
In November 2019, Gunter announced his candidacy for the 2020 Georgia House of Representatives election in District 8, which includes Union, Towns, and parts of White county. Gunter defeated minister Steve Townsend in the Republican primary and went on to defeat Democratic candidate Dave Cooper in the general election. He was reelected in 2022 and 2024.

In 2021, Gunter was appointed vice-chair of the House Judiciary Committee. In 2023, he was appointed chairman and was reappointed in 2025. As of January 2025, he is also a member of the Agriculture & Consumer Affairs, Appropriations, Economic Development & Tourism, Ethics, Health, and Rules committees.

== Personal life ==
Gunter married Rita in 1982. They have two children. Gunter is a Christian.

== Electoral history ==
2024 Georgia House of Representatives election, District 8
Party	Candidate	Votes	%
Republican	Stan Gunter	33,241	84.8
Democratic	Charlotte Sleczkowski	5,945	15.2
Total votes		39,186	100.0
Republican hold			

2022 Georgia House of Representatives election, District 8
Party	Candidate	Votes	%
Republican	Stan Gunter	26,573	84.3
Democratic	June Krise	4,948	15.7
Total votes		31,521	100.0
Republican hold			

2020 Georgia House of Representatives election, District 8
Party	Candidate	Votes	%
Republican	Stan Gunter	29,195	82.0
Democratic	Dave Cooper	6,407	18.0
Total votes		35,602	100.0
Republican hold			

2020 Georgia House of Representatives election, District 8 Republican primary
Party	Candidate	Votes	%
Republican	Stan Gunter	9,917	65.3%
Republican	Steve Townsend	5,273	34.7
Total votes		15,190	100.0
