= Rick Austin (politician) =

American politician (born 1966)

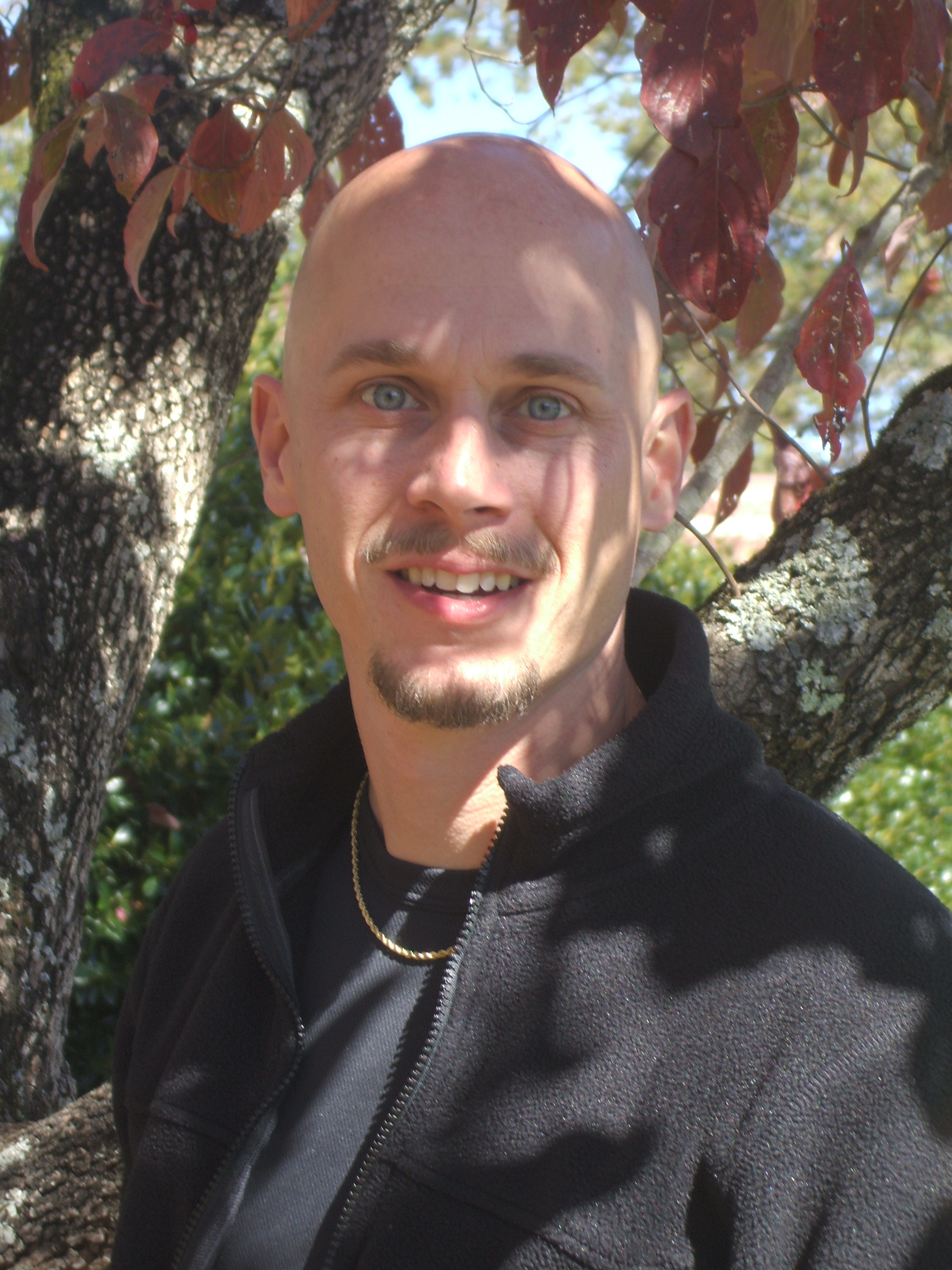
- Austin in 2008

Mayor of Demorest
- Incumbent
- Assumed office January 2013
- Preceded by: Malcolm Hunnicutt

Member of the Georgia House of Representatives from the 10th district
- In office 2009 – September 2011
- Preceded by: Benjamin D. Bridges, Sr.
- Succeeded by: Terry Rogers

Personal details
- Born: June 6, 1966 (age 60) Demorest, Georgia
- Party: Republican
- Spouse: Jennifer Austin
- Children: 2
- Education: Piedmont College; Auburn University; University of Mississippi (PhD)
- Occupation: Professor; politician

Rick Austin (born June 6, 1966) is an American politician. He was a Republican member of the Georgia State House of Representatives, and he represented the 10th District from January 12, 2009 until September 2011. Previously, he was a member of the Habersham County, Georgia, Board of Commissioners for three years. District 10 of the Georgia House of Representatives encompasses all of Habersham County and parts of White County.

== Early life and education ==
Austin was born on June 6, 1966 in Demorest.

He is a graduate of Piedmont College, Auburn University, and the University of Mississippi, where he received his PhD in Biology in 1997.

== Political career ==
In the 2009 election, he ran unopposed in the general election. In 2011 Austin attempted a bid for the Georgia State Senate District 50, and ultimately lost.

Austin got into politics to reform education in Georgia. Austin is a supporter of the CRCT test as a requirement for students to pass their grade. In 2009, he supported a bill to force first and second grade students to take the CRCT to pass.

Austin is also a camp director for Piedmont College's bug camp. The camp exposes local children to the different insects that call Northeast Georgia their home.

In August 2013, Austin declared his intention to qualify for the position of mayor of the city of Demorest in the November elections. He cited an investigation by the Georgia Bureau of Investigation into irregularities with the city's 2012 audit for his reasoning to run. He claims there is an excess of $200,000 missing money within the city government. Austin won the November 2013 election, and took oath in January 2014.

== Personal life ==
His wife, Jennifer, is a fifth grade teacher at Demorest Elementary. The couple has two children, Sloan and Brice.

He is an associate biology professor at Piedmont College in Demorest, Georgia, his hometown.

== See also ==
- List of Auburn University people
