= Georgia's 10th House of Representatives district =

State district in Georgia, USA

Georgia's 10th State House of Representatives district
Representative
Victor Anderson; R–Cornelia
- Demographics: 83.7% White; 3.3% Black; 9.7% Hispanic; 1.4% Asian
- Population: 54,577

District 10 elects one member of the Georgia House of Representatives. It contains the entirety of Rabun County as well as parts of Habersham County.

== Members ==
- Benjamin Bridges (1997–2008)
- Rick Austin (2009–2011)
- Terry Rogers (2011–2021)
- Victor Anderson (since 2021)
