= Georgia's 8th House of Representatives district =

State district in Georgia, USA

Georgia's 8th State House of Representatives district
Representative
Stan Gunter; R–Blairsville
- Demographics: 92.3% White; 1.4% Black; 3.9% Hispanic; 0.6% Asian
- Population: 55,667

District 8 elects one member of the Georgia House of Representatives. It contains the entirety of Towns County and Union County as well as parts of White County.

== Members ==
- Charles F. Jenkins (2003–2009)
- Stephen Allison (2009–2019)
- Matt Gurtler (2019–2021)
- Stan Gunter (since 2021)
