= David Ralston =

American politician from Georgia (1954–2022)

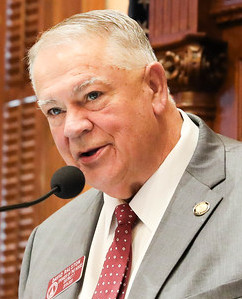

73rd Speaker of the Georgia House of Representatives
- In office January 11, 2010 – November 16, 2022
- Preceded by: Glenn Richardson
- Succeeded by: Jan Jones (Acting)

Member of the Georgia House of Representatives
- In office January 13, 2003 – November 16, 2022
- Preceded by: Charles Poag
- Succeeded by: Johnny Chastain
- Constituency: 6th district (2003–2005); 7th district (2005–2022)

Member of the Georgia State Senate from the 51st district
- In office January 11, 1993 – January 3, 1999
- Preceded by: Bill Hasty
- Succeeded by: Bill Stephens

Personal details
- Born: David Edmond Ralston; March 14, 1954 Ellijay, Georgia, U.S.
- Died: November 16, 2022 (aged 68) Atlanta, Georgia, U.S.
- Party: Republican
- Children: 2
- Education: University of North Georgia (BA); University of Georgia (JD)

David Edmond Ralston (March 14, 1954 – November 16, 2022) was an American attorney and a Republican politician who was a member of the Georgia House of Representatives from 2003 until his death. From 2010 onwards, he was also its 73rd Speaker of the House. Ralston was the longest-serving Republican Speaker in state history and the longest-serving Speaker of the Georgia General Assembly since Tom Murphy.

== Biography ==
David Ralston was born in Ellijay, Georgia. He attended Young Harris College and graduated from North Georgia College and State University in 1976. He graduated from the University of Georgia School of Law in 1980.

From 1992 to 1998, he served as a member of the Georgia Senate. In 1998, Ralston was the Republican nominee for attorney general of Georgia, but lost the election to Thurbert Baker. In 2002, he was elected to the Georgia House of Representatives for the 7th district. He was elected to serve as Speaker in 2010, following the resignation of Glenn Richardson. As such, he is the first state House Speaker from north Georgia in more than 150 years.

== Georgia politics ==
Ralston spearheaded economically conservative initiatives, including passing the first-ever income tax cut in the state in 2018 and eliminating the sales tax on manufacturers. In the wake of the murder of Ahmaud Arbery, Ralston led the effort to pass a state hate-crimes law. Additionally, Ralston passed reforms to Georgia's election process, most recently the Election Integrity Act of 2021. Although Ralston and Republicans said these efforts were to increase voter security within the state, critics said that they are intended to disenfranchise voters and lower turnout.

=== State Bar reprimand ===
In 2014, Ralston was investigated by the Georgia Supreme Court following a complaint that he had ignored a client's case for years and had failed to communicate. In 2016, Ralston and the State Bar of Georgia reached a settlement, with the Georgia Bar issuing a minor reprimand and Ralston admitting to inadvertently breaking State Bar rules, ending a years-long dispute. He had previously faced disbarment.

=== Court case delays ===
In February 2019, the Atlanta Journal-Constitution and WSB-TV reported that Ralston regularly used his position as speaker to benefit his Blue Ridge-based private law practice. A 1905 state law (O.C.G.A. § 17-8-26) requires judges and prosecutors to defer to the schedules of any member of the general assembly who is also a practicing lawyer, and as speaker, Ralston was able to claim scheduling conflicts any time of year. By delaying court cases in this manner, Ralston was able to keep his clients free on bond for months or even years, while weakening court cases over time by letting memories fade and evidence expire. Some of Ralston's clients retained him specifically for these reasons.

Journalists found that over the course of 21 cases, Ralston requested delays 57 times, and that on 76 of the 93 conflicting days, the legislature was not in session; he would commonly delay individual cases over a dozen times each. Charges against Ralston's clients who benefited from this include drunk driving, child molestation, and assault.

In April 2019, an independent researcher reviewed Ralston's court cases across eight counties and found that from 2010 through 2019, Ralston delayed 226 cases a total of 966 times. Multiple attorneys wrote formal complaints to various judges regarding Ralston's delays. In response, Ralston said that the researcher "does not understand the legal system or the criminal justice system... [and] didn't have anything critical to say about my performance as speaker."

The original law allowing this was amended over a century later in 2006 by SB 503. Previously, the law allowed representatives to delay court hearings only during the legislative session and for the following three weeks. A committee was formed to reconcile differences between the house and senate versions of SB 503, and Ralston himself was named a member. His exact role in crafting the current law's language is unknown.

Little to no pushback from judges has been found. Ralston had been known to seek revenge on political opponents and, as speaker, controlled two seats on the investigative panel of the state judicial qualifications commission. Further, the Georgia legislature made itself exempt from the Georgia Open Records Act.

==== Reaction ====
In response, Ralston stated that he would "continue to represent the people of the 7th House district, and... continue being speaker of the House." He also lashed out at reporters, saying the media is interested in "profit[,] not truth."

On February 22, 2019, after more than a week of relative silence from both Republican and Democratic lawmakers—due to what the AJC calls "a reluctance seemingly rooted in Ralston's substantial political power"—state representative David Clark of Buford (98th district) introduced a resolution in the Georgia house (HR 328) calling on Ralston to resign as speaker, saying he felt "betrayed" and stating that Ralston "absolutely abused his power. He used his seat, and he's hurting people." Out of 180 total members, just nine other state representatives, all Republicans, signed Clark's resolution:

- Michael Caldwell (Woodstock, 20th district)
- Kevin Cooke (Carrollton, 18th district)
- Sheri Gilligan (Cumming, 24th district)
- Matt Gurtler (Tiger, 8th district)
- Jeff Jones (Brunswick, 167th district)
- Colton Moore (Trenton, 1st district)
- Ken Pullin (Zebulon, 131st district)
- David Stover (Newnan, 71st district)
- Scot Turner (Holly Springs, 21st district)

Gurtler told the AJC to "remember that legality and morality don't always align;" Moore wrote a letter to Ralston stating that "District 1 and many citizens across our great state believe you should no longer serve as the leader of Georgia's largest governing body"; Pullin said Ralston's "actions may be legal according to state law, but they're not ethical or moral;" Turner stated that he felt "compelled by a sense of duty to call for the speaker to put the gavel down."

Griffin representative Karen Mathiak (73rd district) initially signed the resolution, but later removed her signature.

Local Republican conventions in DeKalb, Gwinnett, and Rabun counties called for Ralston to resign, as did the Gainesville Times.

Meanwhile, politicians from both sides of the aisle defended Ralston. The governor's office said governor Brian Kemp looks forward to working with Ralston. Butch Miller, Georgia senate president pro tempore, said that Ralston "[goes] above and beyond as a citizen legislator." Former Republican governor Nathan Deal said he knows Ralston is "an honorable person," and former Democratic governor Roy Barnes stated it was "foolhardy to call for [Ralston's] resignation."

Many other state representatives expressed support for Ralston; after the allegations surfaced, at a closed-door meeting of Republicans at the Capitol, Ralston received a "spontaneous" round of applause. House majority whip Trey Kelley of Cedartown (16th district) stated "[i]t's really unfair to the speaker, because he also has a pretty important duty and an absolute right of privilege that exists between him and his client." Speaker pro tem Jan Jones of Milton (47th district) called Ralston a "man of integrity." Kasey Carpenter of Dalton (4th district) said Ralston "operated within the confines of the law. If you don't like the law, let's change the law." Ringgold representative Dewayne Hill (3rd district) said, "I hate that this is all coming about... This takes away from us doing and concentrating on the people's needs."

Gainesville representatives Emory Dunahoo (30th district) and Lee Hawkins (27th district) both said they were withholding judgment for now.

Conservative commentators were less supportive, with former radio host Neal Boortz declaring that Ralston should face ethics charges, and WSB radio host Erick Erickson said Republicans "[enabled] this and [let] it happen."

The Georgia Democratic Party released a statement declaring that "Speaker Ralston has abused his power as a public servant to delay and deny justice for crime victims," while former gubernatorial candidate Stacey Abrams was more restrained, saying that she would "leave it to Speaker Ralston to determine if he's meeting his obligations both as an attorney and as a legislator."

==== Changing the law ====
On February 25, 2019, Ralston declared in an "emotional" speech to the Georgia house that he would establish a bipartisan panel to look into how the law should be changed; he also stated that as an attorney, he would not accept any new criminal cases for now. Ralston's speech received a standing ovation. Representative Scot Turner applauded the move to change the law, but said that Ralston still has "a lack of recognition that his actions have caused people harm."

The panel returned a draft law which would allow attorneys and their clients to oppose similar requests for leave, leaving it to the judge to determine the best course of action. The draft was introduced as House Bill 502 and it became law on May 7, 2019. Speaking to the Augusta Chronicle, Ralston said that "to the extent there's a perception that's a problem, then I think we've dealt with it." However, the AJC reported skepticism of the new law due to the fact that "judges have already had the ability to push back on the speaker, but rarely did".

=== COVID-19 response ===
During the 2020 U.S. coronavirus pandemic, Ralston strongly opposed expanding use of mail-in ballots, under the reasoning that it would increase turnout, the possibility of fraud, and hurt Republican candidates. According to Ralston, "This will be extremely devastating to Republicans and conservatives in Georgia. Every registered voter is going to get one of these. … This will certainly drive up turnout."

Ralston later clarified that his concerns were strictly about the likelihood of fraud: "It’s really not a question about higher turnout... It’s just that the election needs to be secure and it must have integrity. If it doesn’t, I think our chances obviously are problematic.”

=== 2020 election ===
After Donald Trump lost the 2020 presidential election and pushed false conspiracy theories about the election results in Georgia, he called Ralston, asking Ralston to hold a special legislative session in the Georgia House of Representatives to overturn the election results. During the call, Trump falsely claimed, "we won this thing by 400,000 or 500,000 votes." In the call, Trump suggested to Ralston that his political fortunes would rise if he were to help Trump overturn the election results. Ralston seemed sympathetic to Trump during the call while noting that the Governor and Lieutenant Governor of Georgia had not supported Trump's attempts to overturn the election results, which had "blown off the idea of there being any kind of recourse." During the call, Ralston said, "I want Donald Trump to remain the president. If there’s any way that we can possibly help in that regard, I’m on board." However, Ralston did not publicly announce his support for a special session or take any specific actions to help Trump.

== Personal life and death ==
Ralston had two children and worked as an attorney in Blue Ridge, Georgia. He was married to Sheree Ralston, and was a member of the Fannin County Chamber of Commerce and the Blue Ridge Mountains Arts Association.

On November 4, 2022, Ralston announced he would not seek another term as House speaker, citing health concerns. He died 12 days later at Piedmont Hospital in Atlanta.

== See also ==
- List of speakers of the Georgia House of Representatives
- Georgia House of Representatives

Party political offices
Preceded by Mike Bowers	Republican nominee for Attorney General of Georgia; 1998	Succeeded by Shannon Goessling
Georgia State Senate
Preceded by Bill Hasty	Member of the Georgia State Senate from the 51st district 1993–1999	Succeeded by Bill Stephens
Georgia House of Representatives
Preceded by Charles Poag	Member of the Georgia House of Representatives from the 6th district 2003–2005	Succeeded by Tom Dickson
Preceded by Ben Bridges	Member of the Georgia House of Representatives from the 7th district 2005–2022	Succeeded by Johnny Chastain
Political offices
Preceded by Glenn Richardson	Speaker of the Georgia House of Representatives; 2010–2022	Succeeded by Jan Jones; Acting
