= Georgia's 9th House of Representatives district =

State district in Georgia, USA

Georgia's 9th State House of Representatives district
Representative
Will Wade; R–Dawsonville
- Demographics: 91.7% White; 1.4% Black; 4.5% Hispanic; 0.5% Asian
- Population: 56,115

District 9 elects one member of the Georgia House of Representatives. It contains parts of Dawson County, Lumpkin County and White County.

== Members ==
- Ben Whitaker (until 2003)
- Amos Amerson (2003–2013)
- Kevin Tanner (2013–2021)
- Will Wade (since 2021)
