= Stephen Allison =

American politician

Member of the Georgia House of Representatives from the 8th district
- In office 2009–2019
- Preceded by: Charles F. Jenkins
- Succeeded by: Matt Gurtler

Personal details
- Born: March 29, 1971 (age 55) Gwinnett County, Georgia, U.S.
- Party: Republican
- Spouse: Regina
- Children: 2
- Education: Virginia Military Institute (BA); John Marshall Law School (JD)
- Profession: Politician

Stephen Allison (born March 29, 1971) is the former representative for the 8th District of the Georgia House of Representatives. He is a graduate of the Virginia Military Institute and a practicing attorney in Blairsville, Georgia. Stephen Allison was elected in November 2008 after a narrow victory over Democratic incumbent Charles F. Jenkins.

== Family ==
Stephen is married to his wife Regina and together they live in Blairsville, Georgia and have two children: Thomas Jackson, Nathanael Greene.

== Religion ==
Stephen is a Christian.

== Education ==
Stephen received his BA in history from Virginia Military Institute in 1993 and obtained his JD from John Marshall Law School in 1996.

== Professional experience ==
From 2000 to 2008 he was an attorney at The Allison Firm.

== Organizations ==
- In 1997 he was president of the Enotah Bar Association
- He is a volunteer history teacher at Grace Co-Op

== See also ==
- Georgia General Assembly
