= Sheri Gilligan =

American politician (born 1963)

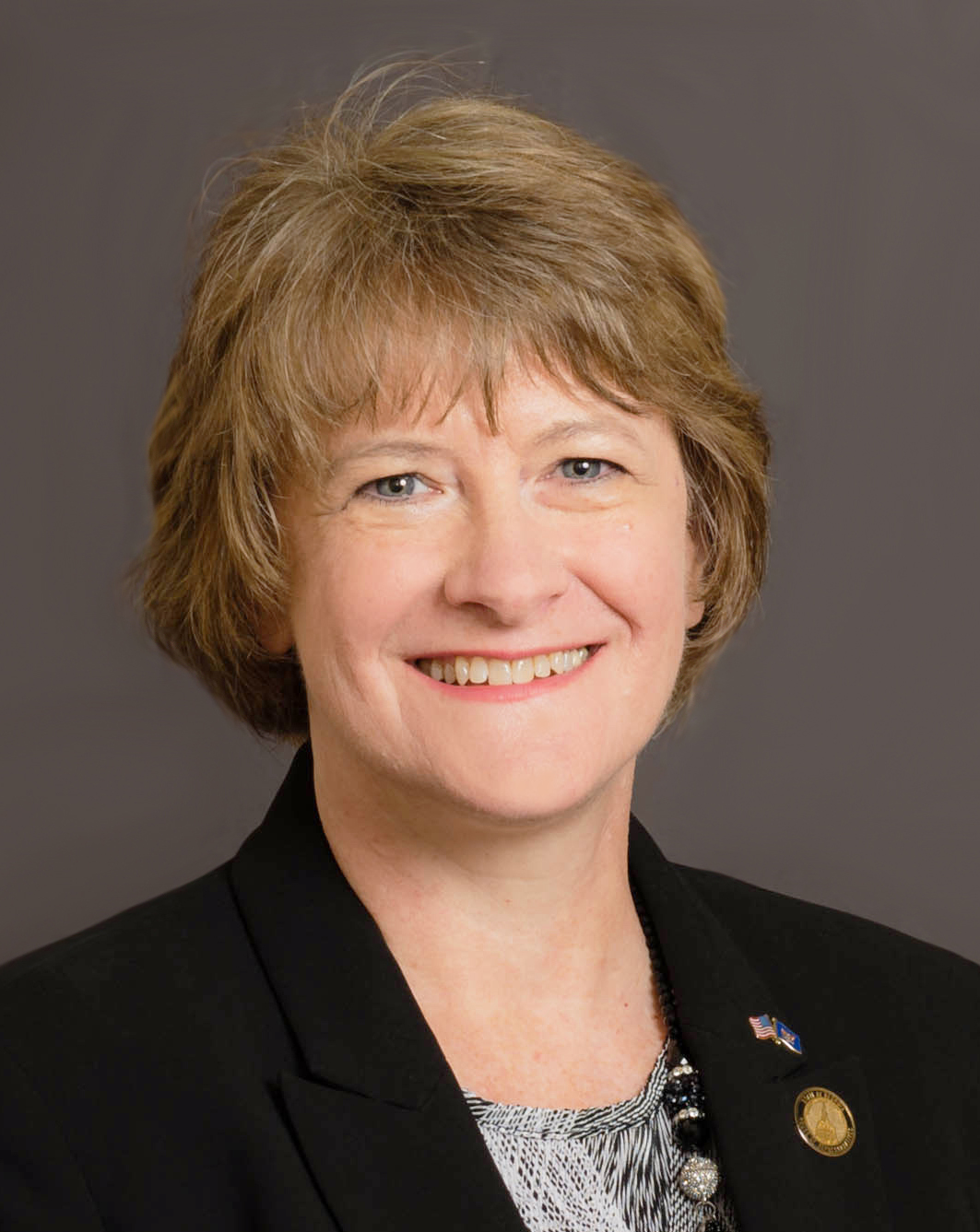
- Official portrait, 2012

Member of the Georgia House of Representatives from the 24th district
- In office August 5, 2015 – January 9, 2023
- Preceded by: Mark Hamilton
- Succeeded by: Carter Barrett

Personal details
- Born: Sheri Smallwood; March 25, 1963 (age 63) Cumming, Georgia, U.S.
- Party: Republican
- Spouse: Patrick Gilligan (m. 1993)
- Children: 4
- Education: University of Georgia

Sheri Smallwood Gilligan (née Sheri Smallwood, born March 25, 1963) is an American politician who served in the Georgia House of Representatives for the 24th district from 2015 to 2023. Gilligan was first elected in 2015 in a special election after previous representative Mark Hamilton resigned; she beat out three other opponents to complete Hamilton's remaining 18-month term.

Gilligan was born and raised in Forsyth County. While in high school, she competed at rifle shooting and set a new state record. After graduating from the University of Georgia, Gilligan moved to the Washington, D.C. area, where she worked as an intelligence analyst for two decades, including at the CIA. She also joined the Naval Reserve.

She is also a substitute teacher for Forsyth County Schools; she previously taught as an adjunct instructor at Lanier Technical College.

A self-described conservative, Gilligan supports gun rights, wants to lower taxes, and restricting abortion. She was a member of the Georgia Freedom Caucus.

Gilligan plays the oboe.

== Elections ==
=== Special election, 2015 ===
A special election was held on June 16, 2015 to fill Mark Hamilton's seat in district 24. Gilligan won the election with nearly half the vote.

Special election results for Georgia House of Representatives district 24, 2015
Party	Candidate	Votes	%
Republican	Sheri Smallwood Gilligan	1,785	49.96
Republican	Will Kremer	171	4.79
Republican	Ethan Underwood	739	20.68
Republican	David M. Van Sant	878	24.57
Total votes		3,573	100.00

=== General election, 2016 ===
Gilligan ran unopposed during the 2016 primaries, going on to earn 25,996 votes in the general election.

=== Primary and general elections, 2018 ===
In 2018, Gilligan was challenged during the May 22 primary elections by Joanna Cloud, but defeated Cloud with 60% of the vote.

Primary election results for Georgia House of Representatives district 24, 2018
Party	Candidate	Votes	%
Republican	Sheri Smallwood Gilligan	4,045	60.69
Republican	Joanna Cloud	2,620	39.31
Total votes		6,665	100.00

In the general election, Gillian ran unopposed once again, garnering 23,646 votes.

=== Primary and general elections, 2022 ===
Gilligan was defeated by Carter Barrett in a runoff in 2022.

Primary election results for Georgia House of Representatives district 24, 2022
Party	Candidate	Votes	%
Republican	Carter Barrett	3,418	42.02
Republican	Sheri Gilligan	4,042	49.69
Republican	Ed Solly	675	8.30
Total votes		8,135	100.00

Primary election runoff results for Georgia House of Representatives district 24, 2022
Party	Candidate	Votes	%
Republican	Carter Barrett	2,317	58.79
Republican	Sheri Gilligan	1,624	41.21
Total votes		3,941	100.00
