= Terry Rogers (American politician) =

American politician

Member of the Georgia House of Representatives from the 10th district
- In office November 18, 2011 – January 11, 2021
- Preceded by: Rick Austin
- Succeeded by: Victor Anderson

Personal details
- Party: Republican
- Spouse: Laura
- Children: 5
- Education: Berry College

Terrell A. Rogers is an American politician. He is a Republican who represented District 10 in the Georgia House of Representatives.

== Political career ==
Rogers was first elected to represent District 10 in the Georgia House of Representatives in a special election in 2011. He won four re-elections unopposed, and announced that he would not seek re-election in 2020.

Rogers currently sits on the following committees:

- Appropriations (Vice-Chairman of Public Safety Subcommittee)
- Defense & Veterans Affairs
- Economic Development & Tourism (Vice-Chairman)
- Human Relations & Aging
- Regulated Industries
- Rules
- State Planning & Community Affairs (Vice-Chairman)

=== Electoral record ===
2011 special election: Georgia House of Representatives, District 10
Party	Candidate	Votes	%
Republican	Terry Rogers	3,594	61.4%
Republican	J. Bruce Harkness, Sr.	1,396	23.9%
Republican	Lori Duke Jones	862	14.7%
