= Charles F. Jenkins (politician) =

American politician

Member of the Georgia House of Representatives from the 8th district
- In office 2003–2008
- Succeeded by: Stephen Allison

Personal details
- Born: Towns County, Georgia
- Party: Democratic
- Spouse: Bonnie

Charles F. Jenkins was a Democratic member of the Georgia House of Representatives, representing the 8th district from 2003 to 2008.

His seat was won by Stephen Allison on November 5, 2008.
