= Georgia Trend =

American magazine

- August 2018 cover of Georgia Trend
- Editor: Susan Percy
- Frequency: Monthly
- Circulation: >50,000
- Founder: Eugene Patterson
- Founded: 1985
- First issue: September 1985
- Company: Morris Publishing Group
- Based in: Norcross, Georgia
- Language: English
- Website: www.georgiatrend.com

Georgia Trend (tagline: The Magazine of Georgia Business, Politics & Economic Development Since 1985) is a monthly business magazine covering business and finance in the U.S. state of Georgia. It was established in 1985 by Times Publishing Company, which published the St. Petersburg Times (forerunner of the Tampa Bay Times). It was modeled on the business magazine Florida Trend, because Eugene Patterson, the then-president of Times Publishing Company, wanted to start a similar magazine in his home state of Georgia. The magazine's first issue was published in September of that year. It is distributed in every county in Georgia.

In February 2017, Morris Publishing Group acquired the magazine's publisher, Trend Publications LLC.
