= Georgia's 7th House of Representatives district =

State district in Georgia, USA

Georgia's 7th State House of Representatives district
Representative
Johnny Chastain; R–Blue Ridge
- Demographics: 90.6% White; 0.5% Black; 6.4% Hispanic; 0.6% Asian
- Population: 55,384

District 7 elects one member of the Georgia House of Representatives. It contains the entirety of Fannin County and Gilmer County as well as parts of Dawson County.

== Members ==
- David Ralston (2005–2022)
- Johnny Chastain (since 2021)
