= Reid House (Atlanta, Georgia) =

- Garrison Apartments
- U.S. National Register of Historic Places
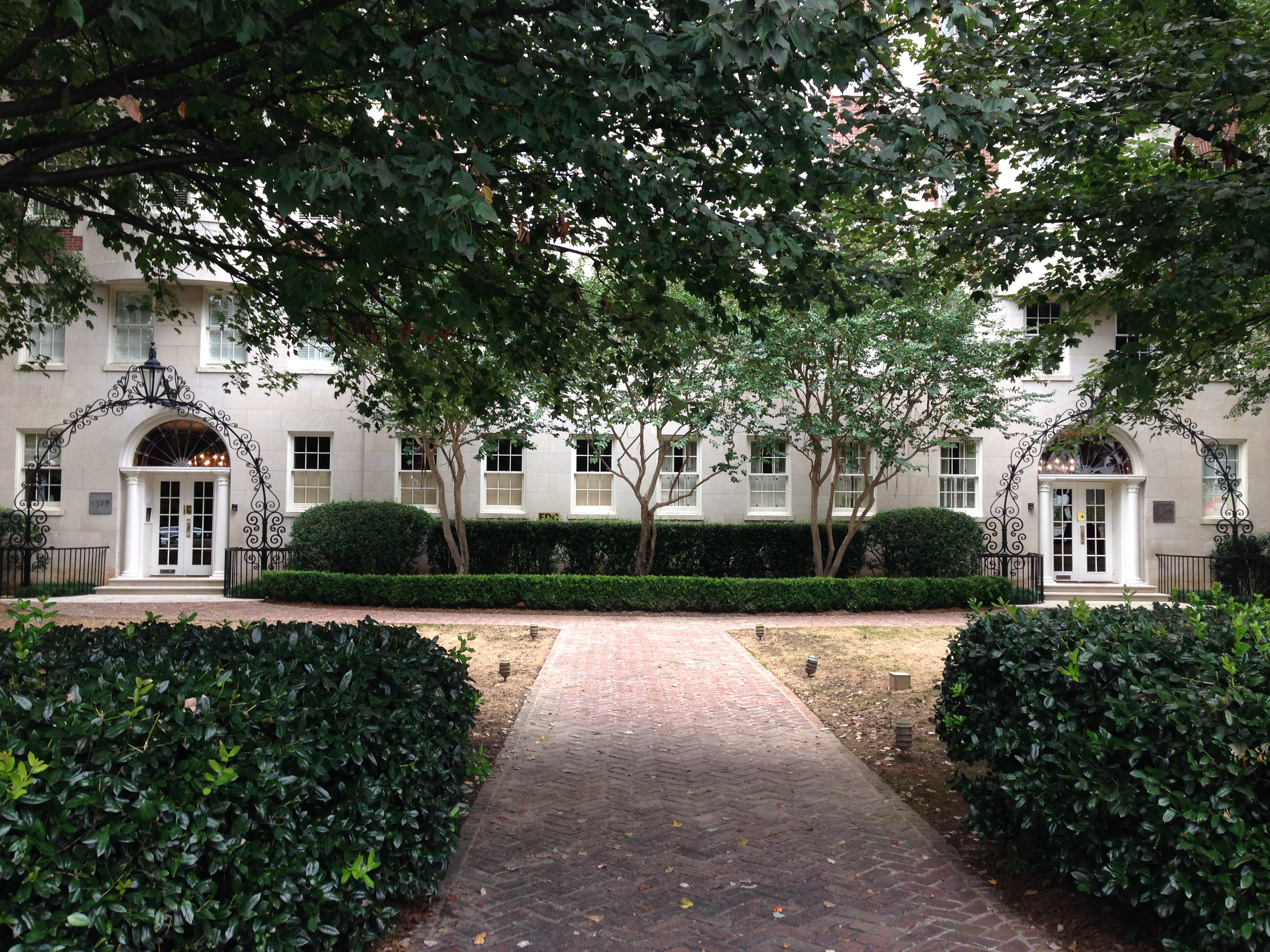

- Location within Atlanta Location within Georgia Location within the United States
- Location: 1325-1327 Peachtree St., NE, Atlanta, Georgia
- Coordinates: 33°47′27″N 84°23′5″W
- Area: 0.8 acres (0.32 ha)
- Built: 1924
- Architect: Shutze, Philip T. (original); Eugene I. Lowry (1974 renovation)
- Architectural style: Classical Revival
- NRHP reference No.: 79000721
- Added to NRHP: January 29, 1979

The Reid House at 1325-1327 Peachtree St., NE, in Atlanta, Georgia, known also as Garrison Apartments (during 1924–26) and as 1325 Apartments (during 1926–74), was built as a luxury apartment building in 1924. It was the third luxury apartment building built in Atlanta. It received a $2 million renovation during 1974 and was converted to a luxury condominium building in 1975. The ten-story building was designed by architect Philip T. Shutze of architectural firm Hentz, Reid and Adler in Classical Revival architecture. The 1974 renovation was by architect Eugene I. Lowry.

There are four stacks of apartments, and each stack has the same, unique floor plan. The building is divided in two halves so that each stack shares a formal elevator lobby with only the apartment across the elevator lobby—semi-private. This building is a rare example in Atlanta of a Manhattan style "classic six and classic eight" pre-war apartment building.

It was listed on the National Register of Historic Places in 1979. The NRHP nomination lists 24 units; it has also been described as having 40 units.

Reid House, or at least some part of it, has also been described as being designed by Neel Reid. It is located across Peachtree Street from the High Museum of Art.
