= Academy of Medicine (Atlanta) =

- U.S. National Register of Historic Places
- Atlanta Landmark Building
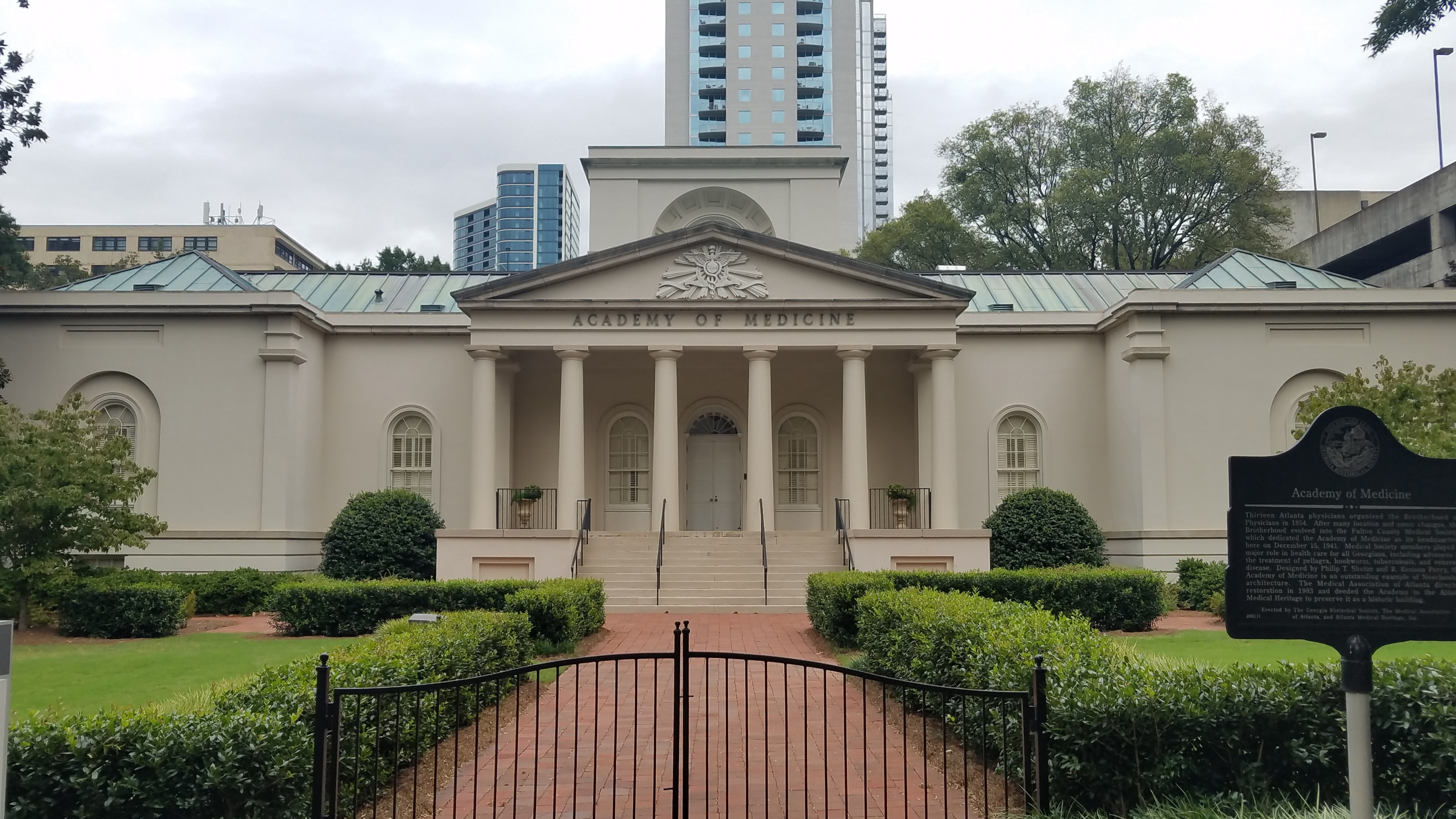
- Building's exterior in 2019

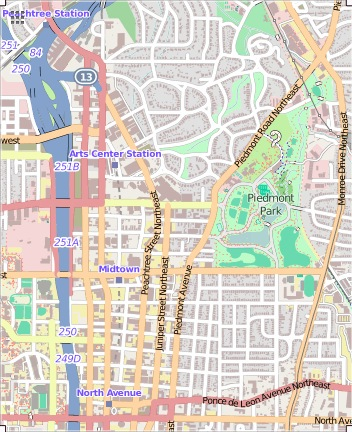
- Location within Atlanta Midtown Location within Atlanta Location within Georgia Location within the United States
- Location: Atlanta, Georgia
- Coordinates: 33°46′45″N 84°23′13″W
- Built: 1941
- Architect: Perry, R.Kennon; Shutze, Philip T.
- Architectural style: Classical Revival
- NRHP reference No.: 80001070

Significant dates
- Added to NRHP: April 30, 1980
- Designated ALB: October 23, 1989

The Academy of Medicine in midtown Atlanta, Georgia, was built in 1941 and housed the Medical Association of Atlanta until the 1970s. The building is listed on the National Register of Historic Places, and is also designated as a historic building by the City of Atlanta. It is currently owned by the Georgia Institute of Technology.

== Construction ==
The Academy was designed by the Atlanta architecture firm of Hentz, Adler & Shutze, with R. Kennon Perry the project architect and Philip Trammell Shutze the supervising principal. The building was intended as a meeting place for Atlanta physicians. Shutze's austerely classical design is reminiscent of the work of John Soane and Benjamin Latrobe.

== Recent history ==
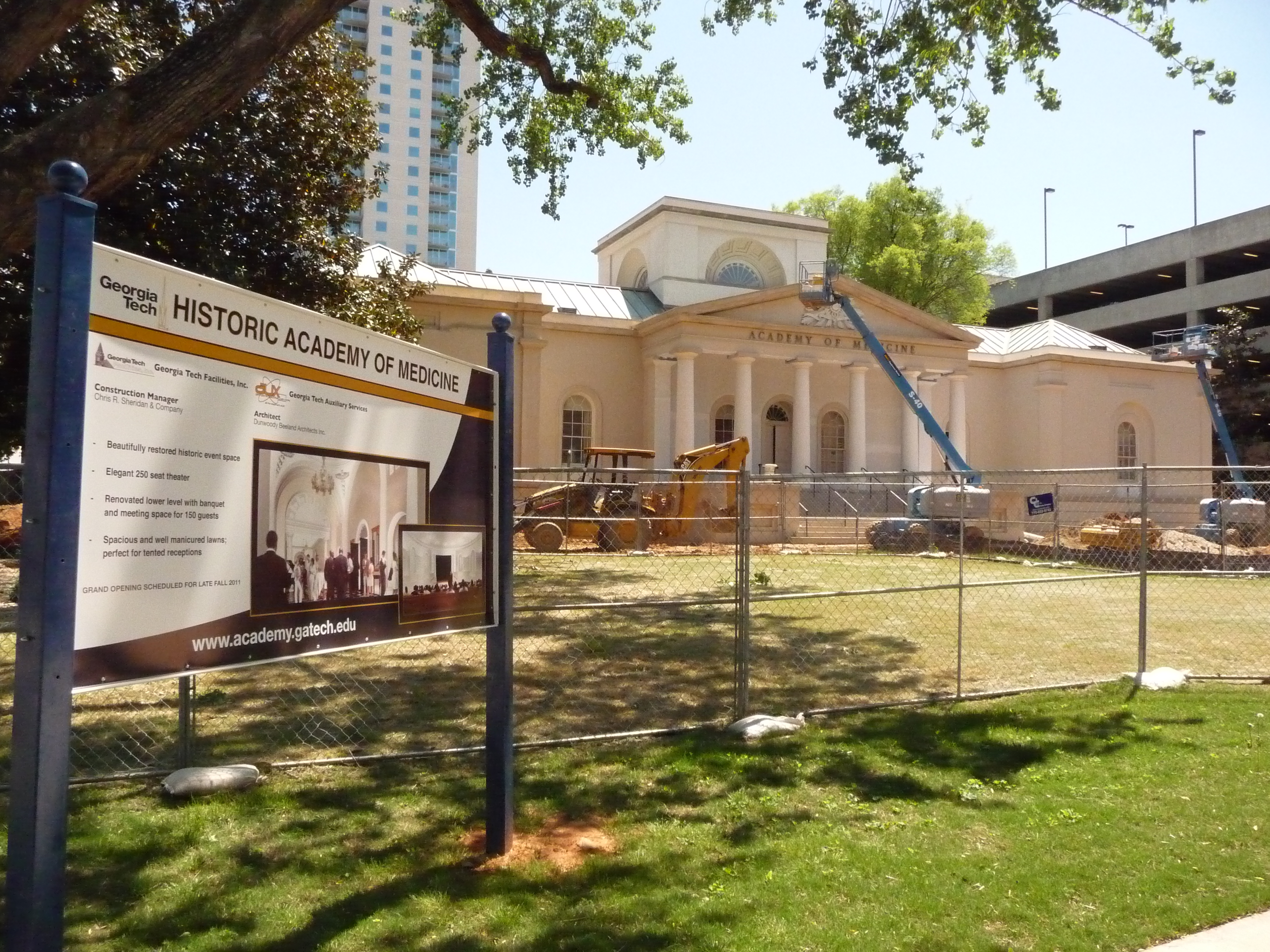
Renovation work, May 2011

By the 1970s, the building had fallen into disrepair. The building was renovated in 1983 and is used by the public as well as the medical profession.

In 2008, Atlanta Medical Heritage, Inc. donated the Academy of Medicine to the Georgia Tech Foundation, Inc. due to lack of resources to maintain the facility. The Georgia Tech Foundation accepted the gift on behalf of the Georgia Institute of Technology, and the building's name, Academy of Medicine, must be retained. Additionally, the properties' designation on the National Register of Historic Places, prevents the university from redeveloping the site or undergoing any improvements inconsistent with the Academy's historical significance.

The property is undergoing restoration for community and campus use, and has been retrofitted to serve the larger community as an event facility. The spacious auditorium provides seating for 250, and may be used for ceremonies, seminars, musical performances or lectures. The building also has a large central rotunda with a domed ceiling from which the chandelier from Gone with the Wind hangs, which host weddings.

== See also ==
- National Register of Historic Places listings in Fulton County, Georgia
