= Villa Albicini =

Historic house in Macon, Georgia, US

- U.S. National Register of Historic Places
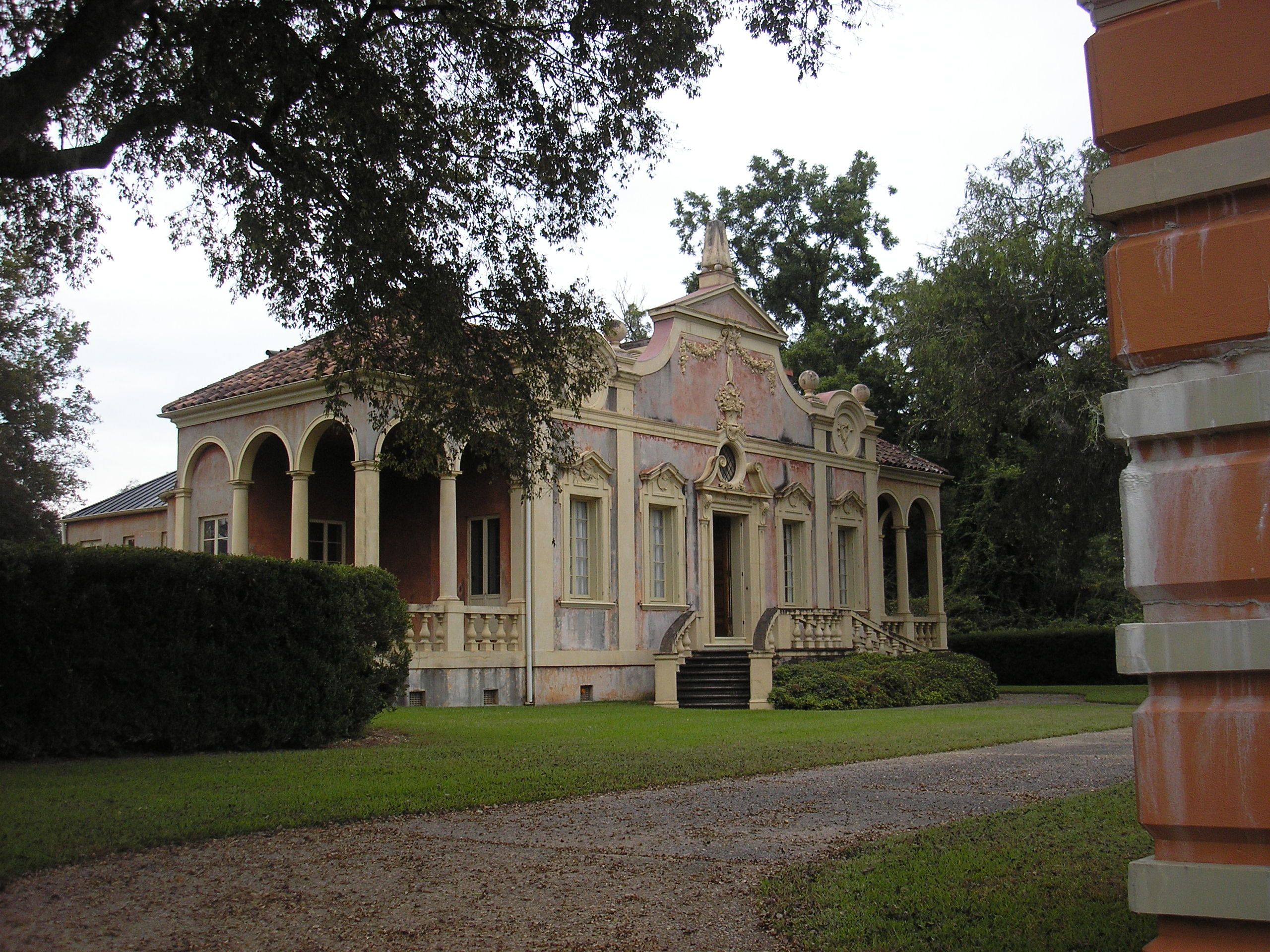

- Location within Georgia
- Location: 150 Tucker Rd., Macon, Georgia
- Coordinates: 32.87375°N 83.71134°W
- Area: 1.5 acres (0.61 ha)
- Built: 1922
- Architect: Neel Reid; Hentz, Reid & Adler
- Architectural style: Beaux Arts, Italian Baroque revival
- NRHP reference No.: 74000661
- Added to NRHP: May 16, 1974

Villa Albicini is a historic house in Macon, Georgia, United States, that was built in the 1920s. It was added to the National Register of Historic Places in 1974.

It is located at 150 Tucker Road. It was designed by Macon architect Neel Reid and built by Daniel Horgan, a local florist, in the 1920s. It is named for 17th-century embroideries made under the supervision of Italian princess Albicini that are displayed in the house. It is located on property that was part of the Idle Hour Stock Farm, known for its racehorses and racetrack. Hogan's nursery business on the property was known as the Idle Hour Nursery.

Design for the building was likely begun by architect Neel Reid before his death, and the Hentz, Reid and Adler firm then completed it. Philip Shutze, specifically, received credit for this house's design. The design combines a facade and plan of an Italian church, a Renaissance villa, and American architectural design elements.

== See also ==
- National Register of Historic Places listings in Bibb County, Georgia
