= Neel Reid =

American architect

- Born: Joseph Neel Reid; October 23, 1885; Jacksonville, Alabama, US
- Died: February 14, 1926 (aged 40); Roswell, Georgia, US
- Resting place: Rose Hill Cemetery; Macon, Georgia, US

Joseph Neel Reid (October 23, 1885 – February 14, 1926), also referred to as Neel Reid, was a prominent architect in Atlanta, Georgia, in the early 20th century as a partner in his firm Hentz, Reid and Adler.

== Early life ==
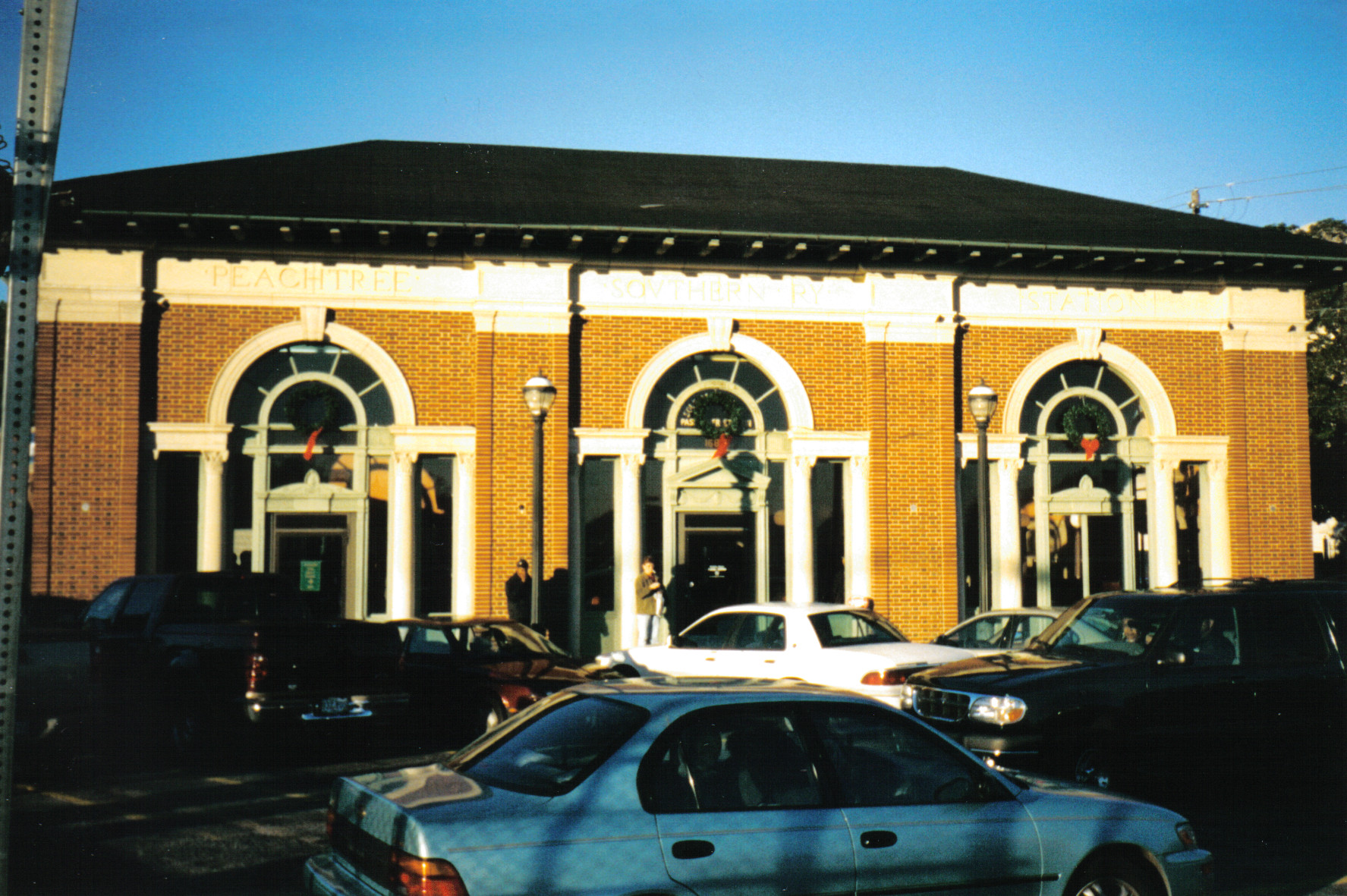
Atlanta Amtrak Station

Reid was born in Jacksonville, Alabama, in 1885. He moved to Macon, Georgia, with his family in 1890. After an apprenticeship with architect Curran Ellis, Reid moved to Atlanta to continue his career at the suggestion of his mentor.

== Career ==
Reid specialized in elaborate homes, but he also designed commercial, transportation, educational, medical, and university buildings. Many of these buildings survive today, primarily centered in the Buckhead and Ansley Park sections of Atlanta and in Athens, Georgia.

The blueprints of Reid's designs are held as part of the Hentz, Reid and Adler Drawing Collection at the Archives and Special Collections of the Georgia Institute of Technology in Atlanta.

Reid lived in Mimosa Hall (built by Major John Dunwoody c. 1840) in Roswell which he bought in 1916 and extensively renovated including designing the gardens.

Reid died of brain cancer on February 14, 1926, at the age of 40 and was buried in Rose Hill Cemetery in Macon, Georgia.

== Legacy ==
A number of his works are listed on the U.S. National Register of Historic Places (NRHP). Reid's work is the focus of two books:

- James Grady, Architecture of Neel Reid in Georgia, University of Georgia Press, 1973
- William Mitchell, Jr., J. Neel Reed, Architect, of Hentz, Reid & Adler, and the Georgia School of Classicists, Gold Coast Publishing, 1997.

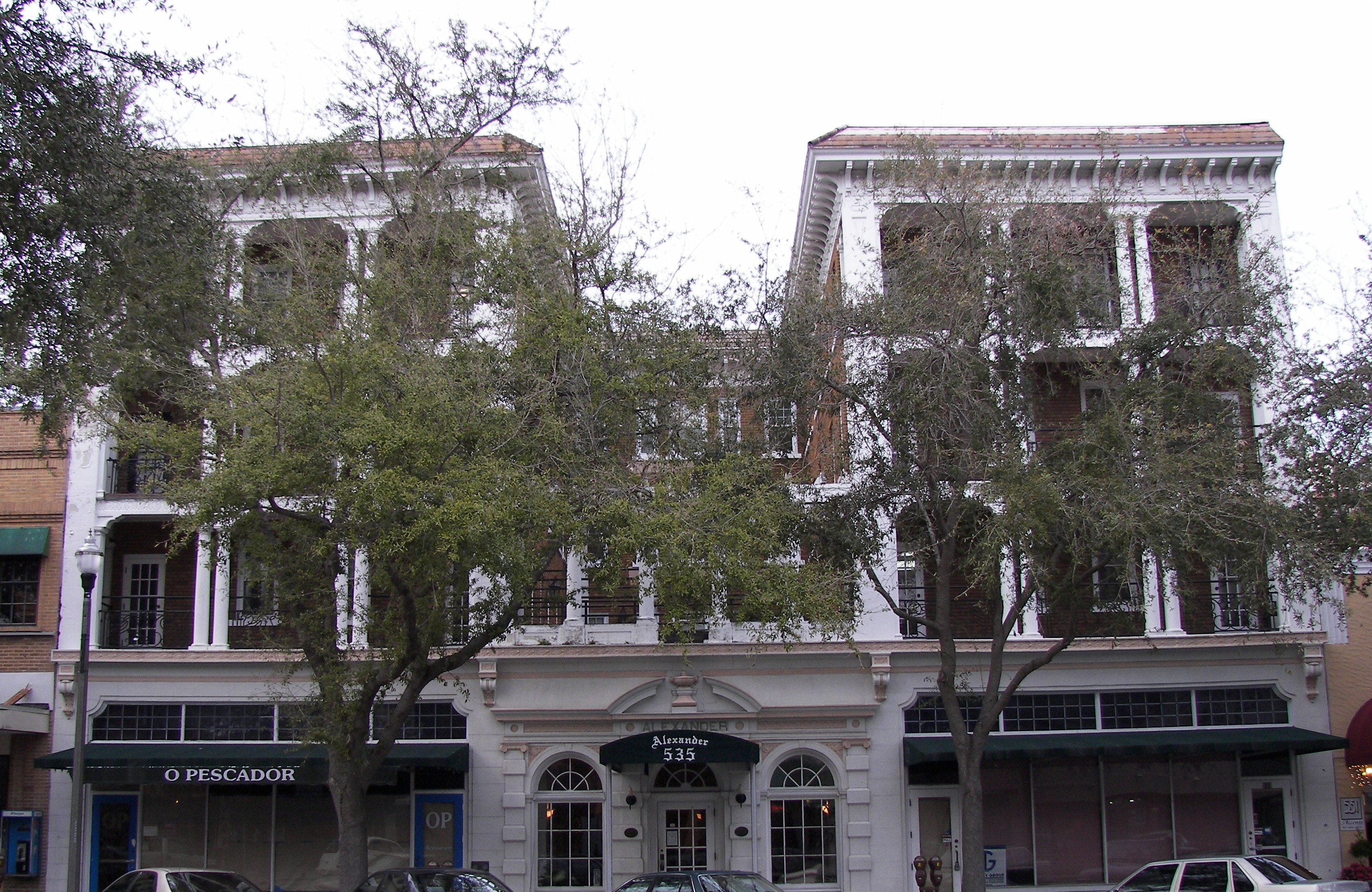
Alexander Hotel

== Work ==
In Athens, Georgia:

- Commerce-Journalism Building, University of Georgia North Campus, now called Brooks Hall
- James R. White, Jr. House, 1084 Prince Avenue
- Michael Brothers Houses, Prince Avenue (between the President's House (University of Georgia) and the Henry W. Grady House, now demolished
- Michael Brothers Store, 320 East Clayton Street

In the Atlanta, Georgia, area:

- Haas-Howell Building, 75 Poplar St., Atlanta GA
- Henry B. Tompkins House, 125 W. Wesley Rd., NW., Atlanta GA
- Peachtree station, Atlanta's Amtrak station, 1688 Peachtree Street, NW, Atlanta GA
- Scottish Rite Hospital for Crippled Children, 321 W. Hill St., Decatur GA
- Several buildings in the Whitlock Avenue Historic District, Roughly bounded by McCord St., Oakmont St., Whitlock Ave., Powder Springs Rd., Trammel St., Maxwell Ave., and Hazel St., Marietta GA
- Several houses in the Ansley Park Historic District, Atlanta GA
- Stuart Witham House, 2922 Andrews Dr., NW, Atlanta GA

Elsewhere in Georgia:

- Hawkes Children's Library, N. College St., Cedartown GA
- Hawkes Library, 210 S. 6th St. Griffin GA
- Hawkes Children's Library, Jackson, Georgia
- Langford House (1913), at 900 Main Street in Conyers, Georgia, Conyers Residential Historic District
- Robert E. Dismukes, Sr., House, 1617 Summit Dr., Columbus GA
- St. George's Episcopal Church (Griffin, Georgia), 132 N. Tenth St., Griffin, GA
- Villa Albicini, 150 Tucker Rd., Macon GA

In Florida:

- Alexander Hotel (St. Petersburg, Florida), 535 Central Ave. St. Petersburg FL
- 310 West Church Street Apartments, 420 N. Julia St., Jacksonville FL, which later became the Ambassador Hotel
