= Albert E. Thornton House =

Historic house in Georgia, United States

- U.S. National Register of Historic Places
- Location within Atlanta Location within Georgia Location within the United States
- Location: 205 W. Paces Ferry Rd., Atlanta, Georgia
- Coordinates: 33°50′41″N 84°23′27″W
- Area: 4 acres (1.6 ha)
- Built: 1936
- Architect: Philip T. Shutze
- Architectural style: Regency Revival
- MPS: West Paces Ferry Road MRA
- NRHP reference No.: 80004458
- Added to NRHP: December 8, 1980

The Albert E. Thornton House in Atlanta, Georgia was built in 1938. It was designed by architect Philip T. Shutze. The house is asserted to be a "superb example of the Regency Revival style in Atlanta".

It is a five-bay central block building with one-story wings. Its Regency features include its apsodial entrance, its use of an elliptical window and an "eye-lid" dormer, and its stucco building material.

Shutze was once regarded as "the nation's foremost living classical architect". He and his firm designed seven of the mansions on Atlanta's West Paces Ferry Road. His landscape design for the "Swan House", another of the mansions, was important to the overall success of that home's English Renaissance Revival architecture. The landscaping of the Thornton House is likewise important in its success.

It was listed on the National Register of Historic Places in 1980.
