= Whitlock Avenue Historic District =

Historic district in Georgia, United States

- U.S. National Register of Historic Places
- U.S. Historic district
- Location within Metro Atlanta Location within Georgia Location within the United States
- Location: Roughly bounded by McCord St., Oakmont St., Whitlock Ave., Powder Springs Rd., Trammel St., Maxwell Ave., and Hazel St., Marietta, Georgia
- Area: 82 acres (33 ha)
- Architect: Reid, Neel; Norrman, Gottried L.
- Architectural style: Late 19th and 20th Century Revivals, Greek Revival, and Late Victorian
- NRHP reference No.: 89001218
- Added to NRHP: September 14, 1989

The Whitlock Avenue Historic District in Marietta, Georgia, is an 82-acre (33 ha) historic district that was listed on the National Register of Historic Places in 1989. The listing included 101 contributing buildings.

It includes Greek Revival from antebellum times and various styles up to the 1930s. The more important works include the Reid House, at 96 Whitlock Avenue, designed by Neel Reid (1885–1926) and the Maxwell House, at 134 McDonald Street, designed by G.L. Norrman.

It includes Italianate architecture from the later 1800s. It includes Late Victorian architecture including Queen Anne.

It includes Late 19th and 20th Century Revivals, including Classical Revival and Dutch Colonial.

It includes Bungalow/Craftsman architecture.

== See also ==
- Northwest Marietta Historic District (connection is noted in National Register NRIS database)
