= Hentz, Reid & Adler =

Former American architectural firm

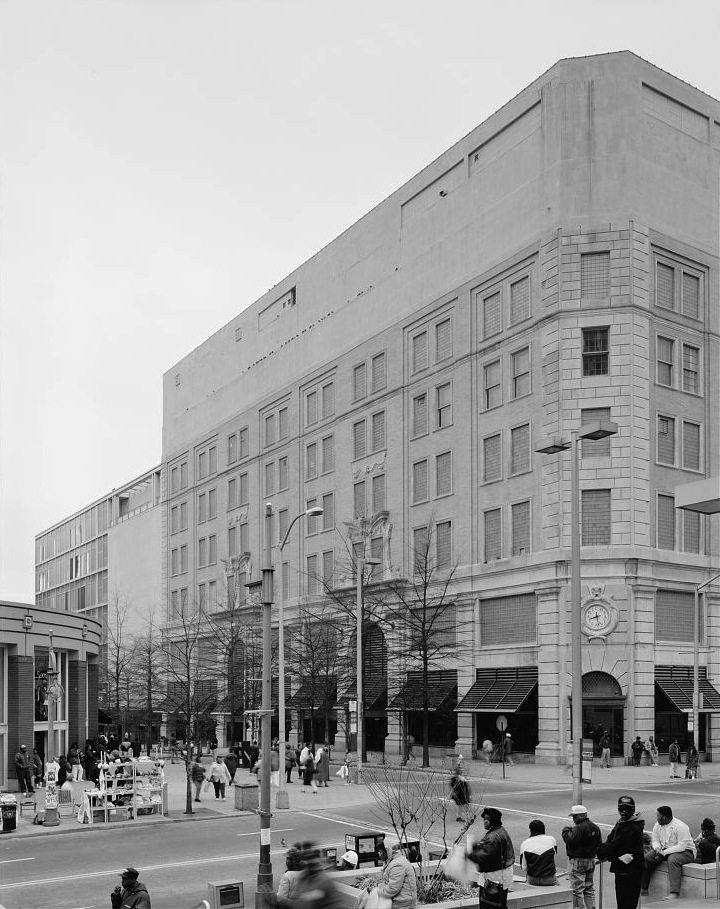
Rich's department store (1924) (east side, taken from northeast

Hentz, Reid & Adler was an architectural firm that did work in the U.S. state of Georgia. The firm is "known in the Southeast for their Beaux-Arts style and as the founding fathers of the Georgia school of classicism."

The partnership Hentz & Reid included Hal Fitzgerald Hentz (1883-1972) and Joseph Neel Reid (1885-1926). Rudolph S. Adler became a partner in 1913. In 1927, after Reid’s death in 1926, Philip T. Shutze became partner in 1927 and the firm became known as Hentz, Adler & Shutze.

Several of their works are listed on the National Register of Historic Places (NRHP).

== Works ==
=== Atlanta ===
- 140 Peachtree Street NE (1911, lower three floors remain), Downtown, currently the downtown offices of the Atlanta Historical Society
- J. Mack Robinson College of Business Administration Building (listed under a previous name, "Citizen's and Southern Bank Building"), a.k.a. the "Empire Building", 35 Broad St. (Hentz, Adler & Shutze), NRHP-listed
- Jacob's drugstore, 886 (now 810) N. Highland Ave. NE, Virginia-Highland
- Paramount Theater (orig. Howard Theater), Peachtree St., between Ellis and Houston (demolished 1960)
- Peachtree Southern Railway Station, 1688 Peachtree St., NW, Brookwood (Hentz, Reid & Adler), NRHP-listed
- Reid House Condominiums (1924), 1325 Peachtree St. NE, Midtown
- Rich's department store flagship (1924), Broad St., South Downtown
- Henry B. Tompkins House, built 1922, 125 W. Wesley Rd., NW., Atlanta (Hentz, Reid & Adler), NRHP-listed
- Swan House, home of Edward and Emily Inman, built in 1924. Now part of Atlanta History Center, NRHP-listed

=== Rest of Georgia ===
- Athens: Harold Hirsch Hall, University of Georgia School of Law (Hentz, Adler & Shutze)
- Cedartown: Hawkes Children's Library, N. College St. (Hentz, Reid & Adler), NRHP-listed
- Columbus: Robert E. Dismukes Sr., 1617 Summit Dr. (Hentz, Reid & Adler), NRHP-listed
- Griffin: St. George's Episcopal Church, 132 N. Tenth St. (Hentz, Reid, and Adler), NRHP-listed
- Macon:
  - Massee Apartments (1924), 347 College St.
  - Villa Albicini, 150 Tucker Rd. (Hentz, Reid & Adler), NRHP-listed

=== Outside Georgia ===
- 310 West Church Street Apartments, 420 N. Julia St., Jacksonville, Florida (Hentz, Reid & Adler), NRHP-listed
