= Rutherford and Martha Ellis House =

Historic house in Georgia, United States

- U.S. National Register of Historic Places
- Location within Atlanta Location within Georgia Location within the United States
- Location: 543 W. Wesley Rd., NW, Atlanta, Georgia
- Coordinates: 33°49′54″N 84°24′20″W
- Area: 3.6 acres (1.5 ha)
- Built: 1939
- Architect: Shutze, Philip Trammell; et al.
- Architectural style: Colonial Revival
- NRHP reference No.: 09000269
- Added to NRHP: May 6, 2009

The Rutherford and Martha Ellis House at 543 W. Wesley Rd., NW, in Atlanta, Georgia is a Colonial Revival cottage that was built in 1939. It was designed by architect Philip Trammell Shutze to resemble a colonial house built in 1770 in Wiscasset, Maine.

The property has also been known as Loblolly Hill. It was listed on the National Register of Historic Places in 2009.

The house was deemed significant for its architecture and also for its association with Rutherford Ellis, a leader in Atlanta's business, university, and charitable non-profit realms.

== See also ==
- Wiscasset Historic District
