= Ambassador Hotel (Jacksonville) =

- 310 West Church Street Apartments
- U.S. National Register of Historic Places
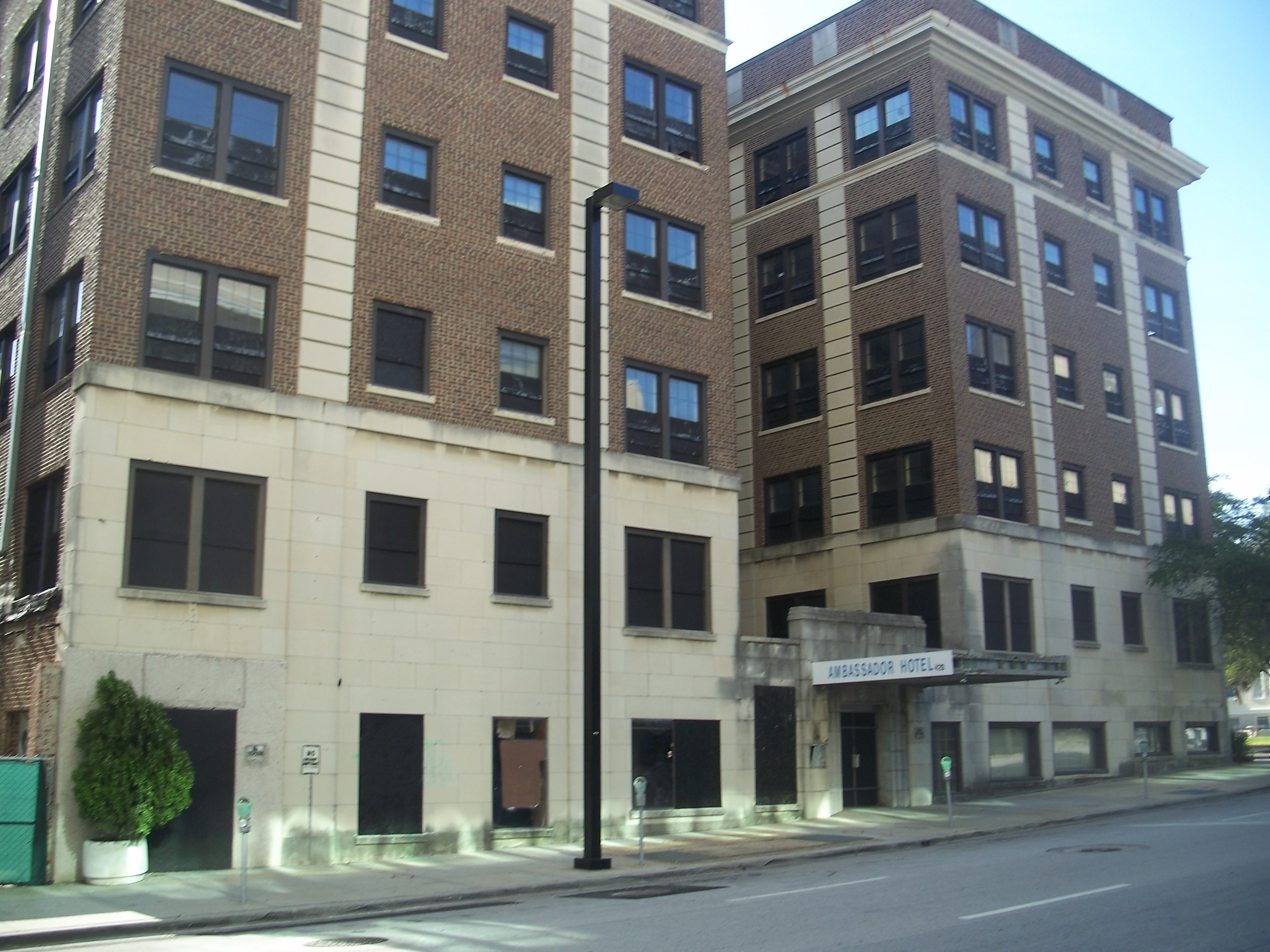
- Ambassador Hotel, 2011

- Location within Florida Location within the United States
- Location: 420 N. Julia St, Jacksonville, Florida, United States
- Coordinates: 30°19′50″N 81°39′41″W
- Area: less than one acre
- Built: 1923
- Architect: Hentz, Reid and Adler
- Architectural style: Georgian Revival with Beaux-Arts elements
- NRHP reference No.: 83001421
- Added to NRHP: April 7, 1983

The 310 West Church Street Apartments, also known as the Ambassador Hotel, is a historic building located at 420 North Julia Street in Jacksonville, Florida, United States. On April 7, 1983, it was added to the U.S. National Register of Historic Places.

== History ==
The upscale 310 West Church Street Apartments in 1924. Designed by Hentz, Reid and Adler architects, the six-story brick building was constructed in the Georgian Revival architectural style, with Beaux-Arts elements, in an "H"-shape to provide windows in all of the units. The main entrance is fronted by large rusticated ashlar stonework, set with a scroll keystone.

It was converted to a hotel in 1944, named first the Three-Ten Hotel, then renamed the Hotel Southland in 1947, the Griner Hotel in 1949 and the Ambassador Hotel in 1955. In 1970, the hotel was purchased by Sam Easton, later a principal in the Jacksonville real estate firm Easton Sanderson & Company.

Over the years the hotel fell into disrepair, as Jacksonville's downtown went into decline. The building was added to the National Register of Historic Places in 1983. It was converted into a low-rent single room occupancy hotel, with rooms rented by the week, and finally closed in 1998.

In 2005, Jacksonville businessman Lamonte Carter announced plans to purchase and restore 310 West Church Street. He had encountered the building when he happened to park in front of it on his way to an appointment. He contacted Easton, who had halted a plan to renovate the surrounding block after construction stalled on the Duval County Courthouse, located nearby. Carter's plan for 310 West Church, estimated to cost $8 million in private equity, government grants, and low-interest loans, was to convert the ground floor to commercial space and turn the top five floors into 50 apartments.

In 2018, the building was acquired by Axis Hotels LLC, which announced plans to renovate it as a boutique hotel, with 100 rooms and a rooftop bar. Axis also purchased the adjacent former Marine National Bank building at 404 North Julia Street, which the company planned to demolish, to construct a 200-unit apartment building with 15,000 square feet of retail space.

Gateway Jax Inc. bought the building and the rest of the block, including the adjacent Central National Bank building in February 2025 for $17 million. In April 2026, Gateway announced plans to renovate the Ambassador as a boutique hotel, at a cost of $50 million. They renamed the property the Hotel Merrydelle, after local artist Merrydelle Hoyt. They plan to reopen the hotel in 2027, as part of Marriott's Tribute Portfolio brand.
