= Philip T. Shutze =

American architect

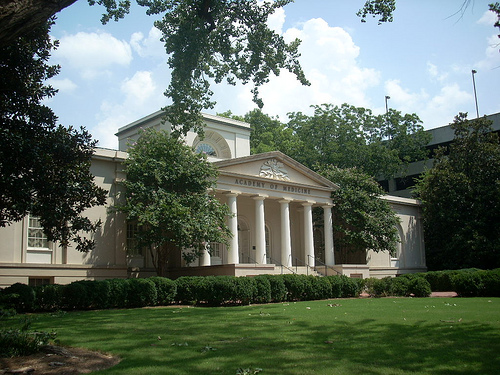
Academy of Medicine, Atlanta

Philip Trammell Shutze (August 18, 1890 – October 17, 1982) was an American architect. He became a partner in 1927 of Hentz, Adler & Shutze. He is known for his neo-classical architecture.

== Biography ==
Shutze was born in Columbus, Georgia to Sarah Lee (née Erwin) and Phillip Trammell Shutze. He graduated with a B.S. in architecture from Georgia Tech in 1912, and Bachelor of Architecture from Columbia University in 1913. After winning the Rome Prize in 1915 he spent several years in Europe studying European architecture before returning to Atlanta to work for the architectural firm of Hentz, Reid and Adler. Shutze thereafter designed many well-known buildings in the Atlanta area, becoming a partner of the company in 1927. He was a Fellow of the American Academy in Rome. Shutze died in Atlanta on October 17, 1982.

He "was also known for his important collection of porcelain, silver, furniture, rugs, and paintings", which is on display in the Swan House of the Atlanta History Center. He is the subject of a signature, permanent exhibit at the Atlanta History Center.

Several of Shutze's works are listed on the U.S. National Register of Historic Places.

== Work ==
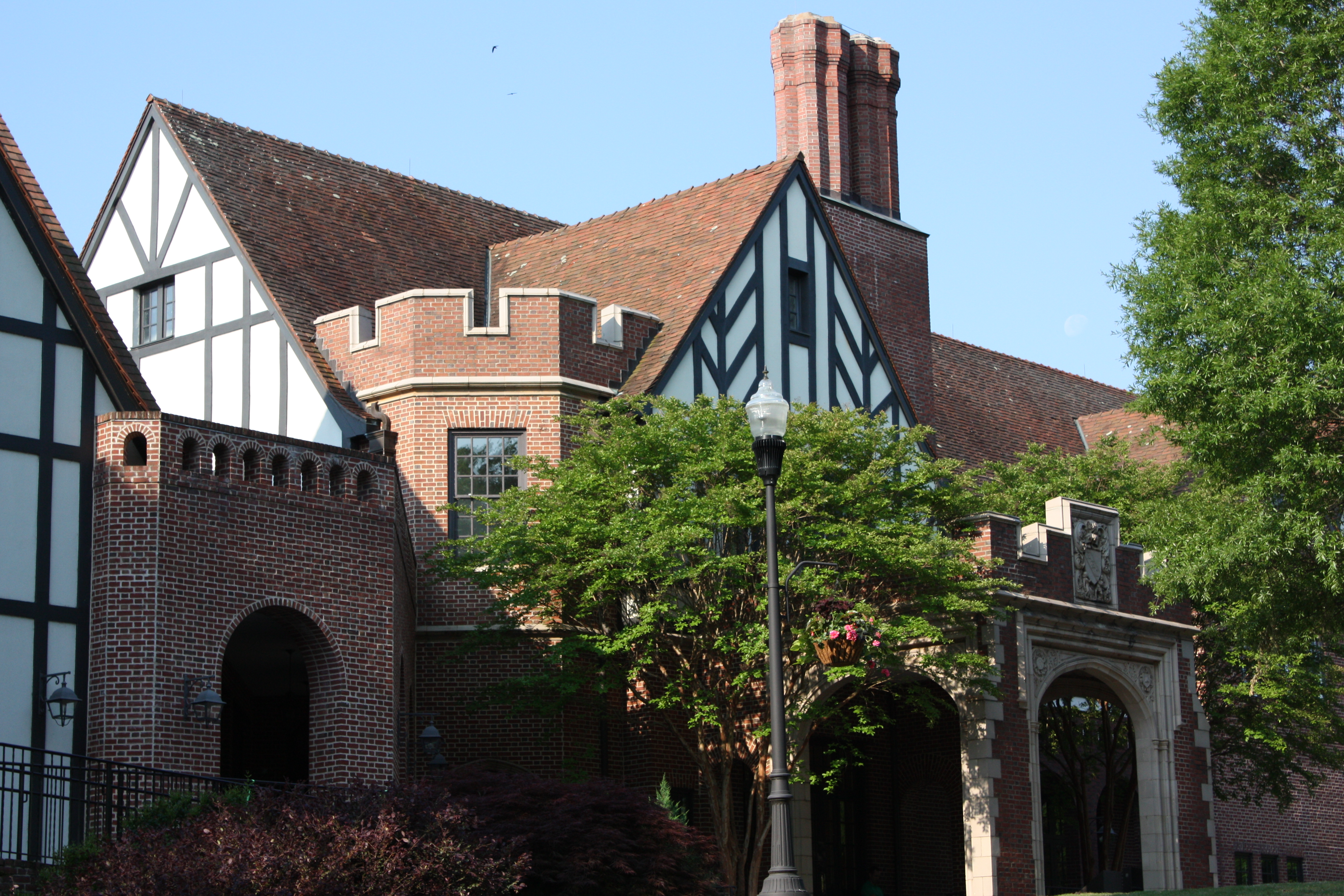
East Lake Golf Club, Atlanta

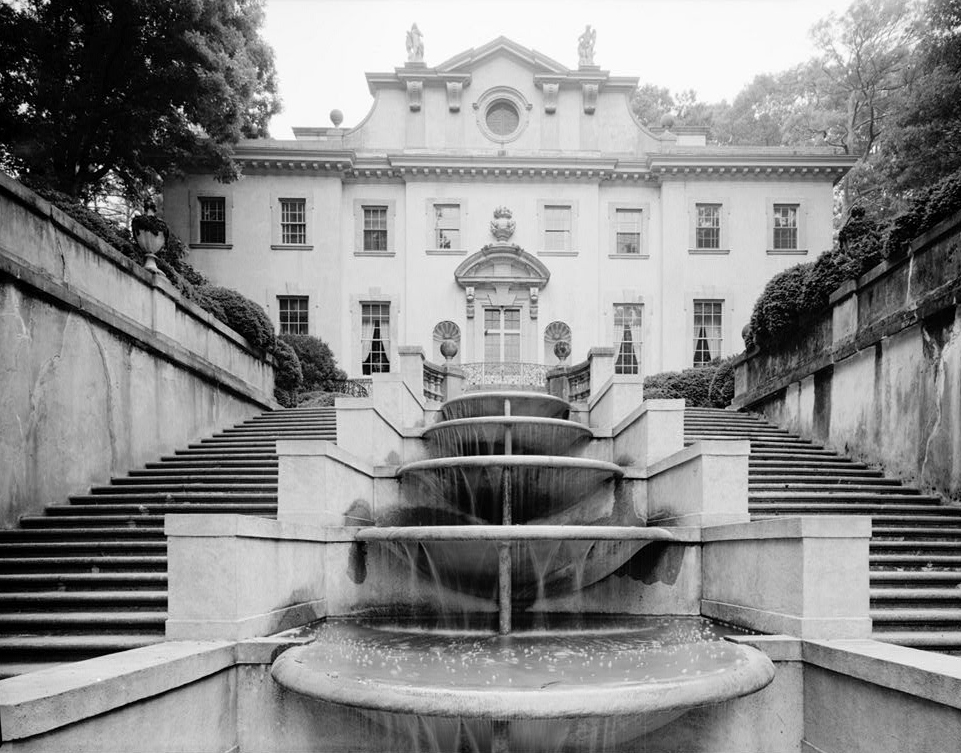
Swan House, Atlanta

Works include (with attributions including spelling variations):

- Hirsch Hall of the University of Georgia School of Law
- 200 Peachtree, built 1927, 200 Peachtree Street NE, Atlanta, GA
- Swan House, 3099 Andrews Dr., NW. Atlanta, GA, on the grounds of what is now the Atlanta History Center, (Schutze, Philip T.), NRHP-listed
- Albert E. Thornton House, 205 W. Paces Ferry Rd. Atlanta, GA (Schutze, Phillip), NRHP-listed
- May Patterson Goodrum House, 320 W. Paces Ferry Rd. in Atlanta, NRHP-isted
- Academy of Medicine, 875 W. Peachtree St., NE Atlanta, GA (Shutze, Philip T.), NRHP-listed
- East Lake Golf Club Clubhouse, 2575 Alston Drive SE, Atlanta, GA
- Citizen's and Southern Bank Building, 35 Broad St. Atlanta, GA (Hentz, Adler & Shutze), NRHP-listed
- Rutherford and Martha Ellis House, 543 W. Wesley Rd., NW Atlanta, GA (Shutze, Philip Trammell), NRHP-listed
- Garrison Apartments, 1325–1327 Peachtree St., NE Atlanta, GA (Shutze, Philip T.), NRHP-listed
- The Temple, built 1931, 1589 Peachtree St., Atlanta, GA (Shutze, Philip), NRHP-listed
- Henry W. Grady High School, original 1924 building and 1950 renovations by Shutze
- Garden Hills Elementary School
- Harris Hall, Emory University (1929).
- The Villa (1920) Ansley Park Atlanta, Georgia
- Howard Theatre (1920), 169 Peachtree St. NE, Atlanta, GA
- Norris/Camp House, (1937), 3049 Highway 29 N., Newnan, GA (Hentz, Adler & Shutze)
- Monie Ferst House, 845 Clifton Road, (1929), Atlanta, GA
- White Oaks (1957), 1209 Roe Ford Road, Greenville, SC
- H.M. Patterson & Son Spring Hill Chapel (1928), 1020 Spring Street, Atlanta, GA
