= Swan House (Atlanta) =

Historic mansion in Atlanta, US

- U.S. National Register of Historic Places
- Atlanta Landmark Building
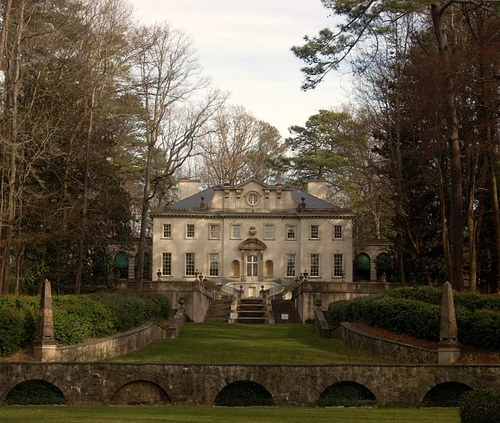
- Front of Swan House and Yard

- Location within Atlanta
- Location: Atlanta, Georgia
- Coordinates: 33°50′25″N 84°23′17″W
- Built: 1928
- Architect: Schutze, Philip T.
- Architectural style: Late 19th and 20th Century Revivals
- NRHP reference No.: 77000434

Significant dates
- Added to NRHP: September 13, 1977
- Designated ALB: October 14, 1989

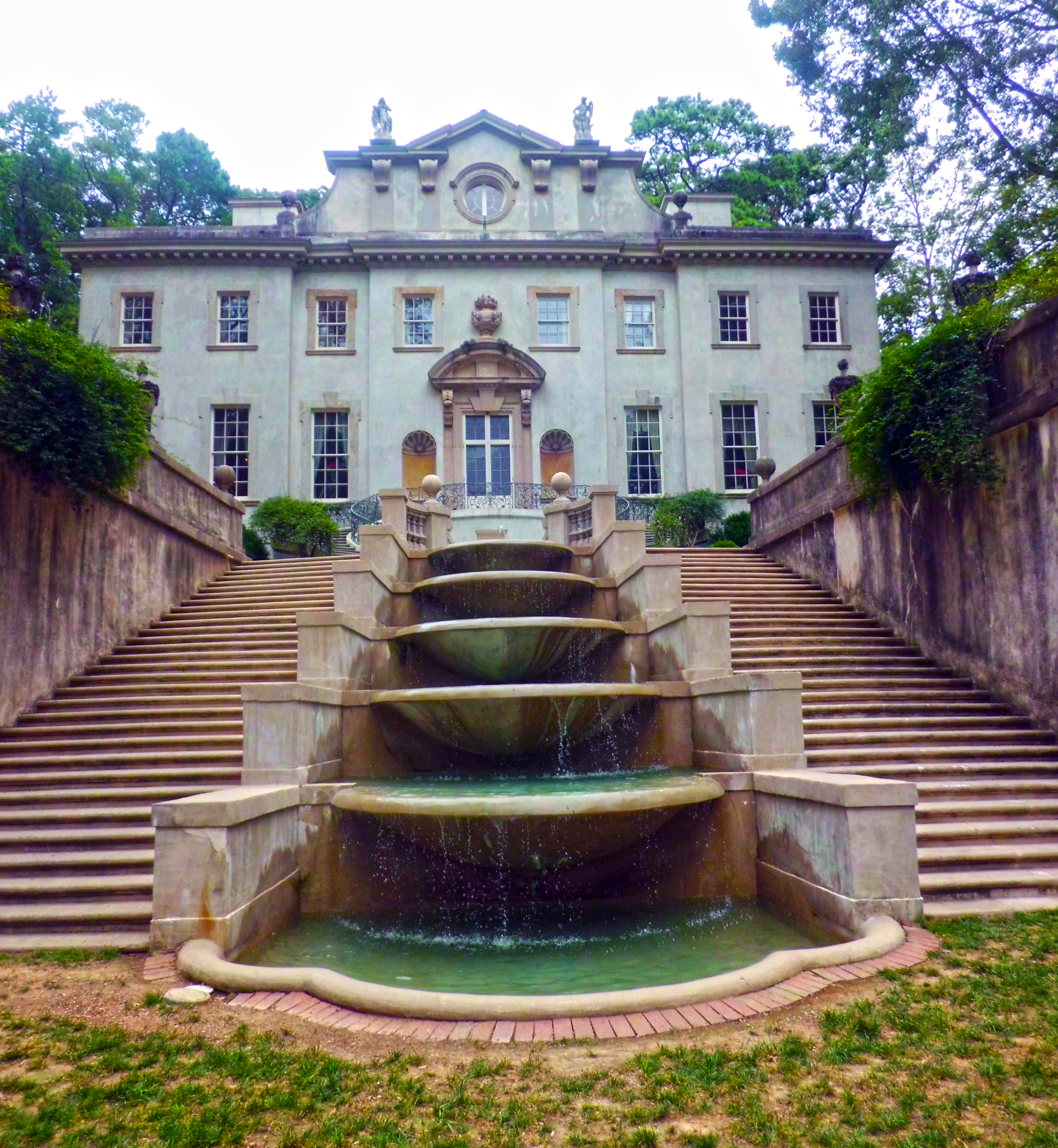
The cascading fountain following the stairs down the back of the house.

The Edward Inman "Swan" House is a mansion in Atlanta, Georgia. It was designed by Philip T. Shutze and built in 1928 for Edward and Emily Inman. The house is currently part of the Atlanta History Center, and it has been featured in The Hunger Games: Catching Fire and The Hunger Games: Mockingjay, Part 2.

== Style ==
Often described as "eclectic," the Swan House features an amalgamation of several different architectural styles. As a whole, the house adheres to Renaissance revival, but inspiration is drawn from sources across multiple time periods and geographic locations. Italian and English classicism were blended to suit the needs and interests of the wealthy twentieth-century residents.

Italian classicism, especially that of the late Renaissance period during the 16th century, is marked by complex and sophisticated design which is not necessarily unified. One important principle is variety of form, which Shutze accomplished by combining such an assortment of styles. The quality of decoration is valued more highly than demonstrating structural integrity and purpose. Walled gardens became a central component of Italian classicism, and they are regarded as just as important as the building itself. Classical architecture often uses columns and pediments, as can be seen in the Swan House.

English classicism followed the lead of Italian classicism from the 17th century onwards, set in motion by Inigo Jones. The Renaissance style manifested in England through country houses, rather than religious or civic institutions. These houses often followed the Classical outline of Doric order columns on the first floor, with Corinthian and Ionic orders on the floors above, which is demonstrated in the Swan House.

The symmetrical western facade and the garden cascade of the Swan House are distinctly of the Italian Renaissance. The east front and the portico are Anglo-Palladian, an Italian classical style which was popular in English country houses during the 17th century. The house's interior also reflects Anglo-Palladian style in its wood carvings and wall ornaments. While the rooms convey distinct eighteenth-century style, they are transformed by the twentieth-century taste in the furnishings.

== Architect ==
The house was designed by Philip T. Shutze. Shutze is widely regarded as "Atlanta's best known architect," and he designed notable civic landmarks as well as private residential homes. He was a classical architect prominent throughout America, and he was particularly known for his skill in detailing and proportions.

Shutze studied architecture at the Georgia School of Technology, Columbia University, and the American Academy in Rome, Italy, which provided first-hand experience of the Italian Renaissance style he would employ throughout his career. His architectural career was initiated by his work as a draftsman for the Atlanta architectural firm Hentz, Reid, and Adler. This education in the Beaux-Arts tradition informed his classical designs. He traveled frequently, studying the impact of different climates and environments on architecture. He also paid attention to the use of texture, color, and locational context when designing his buildings.

== Design ==
Stone obelisks and fountains are present outside the house, both of which are reminiscent of Renaissance architecture. There are broken pediments and Roman Doric columns on the portico, which were inspired by Duncombe Park in Yorkshire, England. Sculptures by the entrance representing the seasons of summer and autumn contribute to "the Italian villa feeling."

Inside, there is a vestibule, a library, a morning room, a dining room, four bedrooms, a sitting room, a basement, and an apartment in the attic. The interior decoration was the product of collaboration between Shutze and Emily Inman, as Inman wanted to ensure that the house would be able to accommodate her collection of antiques. The details of the interior are in high relief so as to cast shadows throughout the house.

The house is perched on top of a hill, and there is a staircase at the back of the house with a dramatic water cascade running down the hill. The water cascade was inspired by the Palazzo Corsini in Rome, which Shutze had studied at the American Academy.

The formal gardens outside the house were also designed by Shutze, and they are also inspired by Italian style. The gardens feature terraced lawns, stone walls, and a formal motor court. There is a notable juxtaposition between the grand lawns and the small, private boxwood gardens.

== Residency ==
Swan House was designed specifically as a residence for Edward and Emily Inman, who were the affluent heirs to a cotton fortune. The Inmans used their money to help rebuild Atlanta after the destruction it endured during the Civil War. Phillip Schutze himself gave the Swan House its colloquial name, based on the motif of swans present throughout the house's interior — the swan motif was one of his "favorite things" about the house. In addition to the house itself, the Inmans also owned the surrounding 28-acre estate, including other facilities such as a garage, servants' quarters, and a barn.

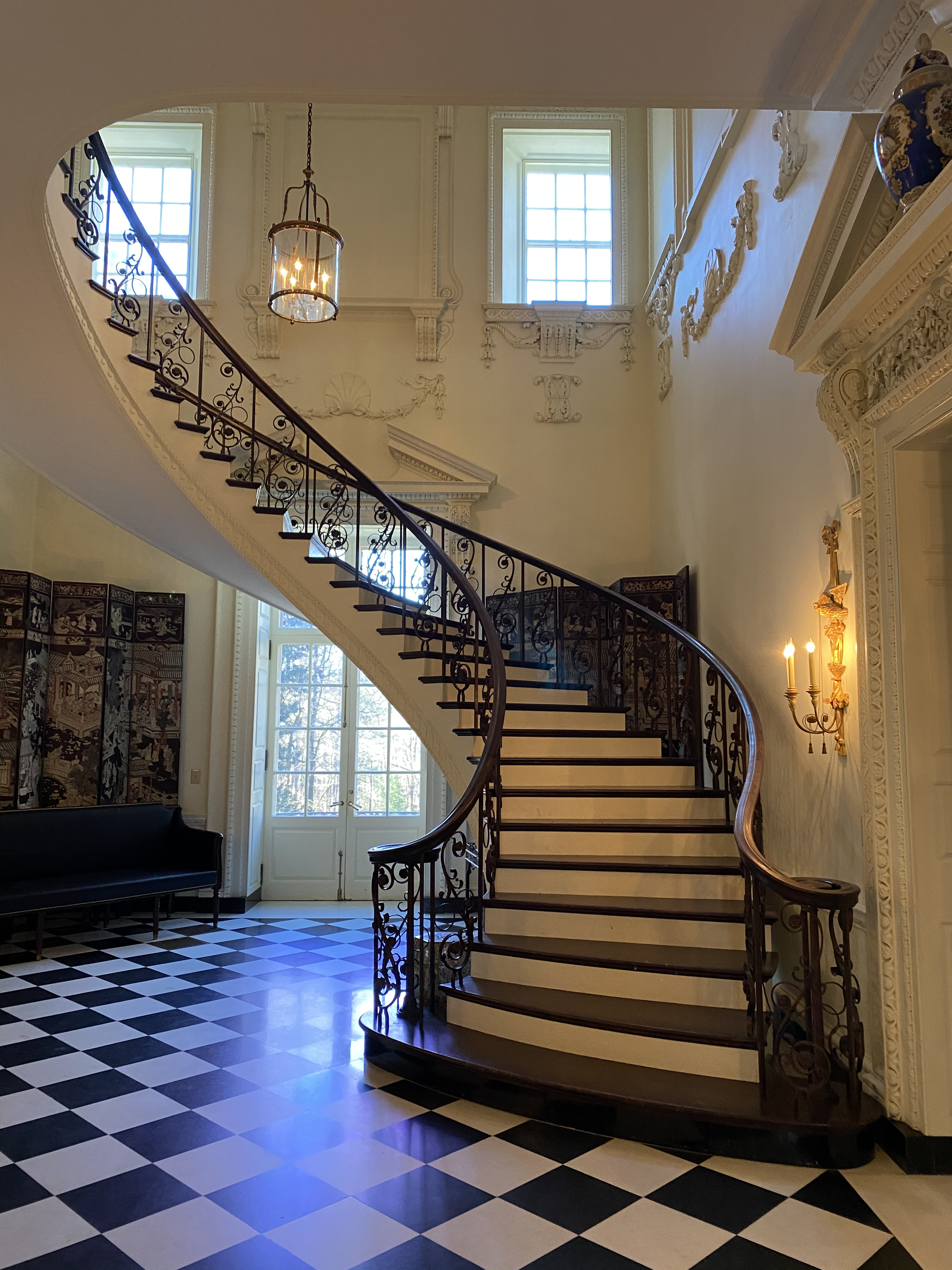
The grand staircase in the interior of the house.

Construction of the house began in 1925. The house is located in the Buckhead neighborhood, a residential suburb of Atlanta. The house was completed in March 1928, at which point the Inmans moved in.

Edward Inman died three years after moving in, so Emily asked her children and grandchildren to move into the house with her. Emily Inman felt so strongly about preserving the grand staircase inside the house that she refused to let anyone use it, instead making everyone use the servants' staircase in the back of the house. Emily Inman lived there until her death.

== Current use ==
In 1966, the Swan House was purchased by the Atlanta Historical Society, with the goal of both preservation and a new headquarters for the Society. The purchase generated significant interest and participation from the community. After the Swan House proved to be an insufficient space for the historical society's headquarters, a new building was built on the estate grounds for the express purpose of housing the headquarters, and the Swan House itself was turned into a museum. When the Atlanta Historical Society decided in 1993 to consolidate its properties into one unified Atlanta History Center, the Swan House was included.

The house has been restored to its original state, with both the interior and the exterior refurbished to be historically accurate. The property has been open to the public for tours since 1967, providing a glimpse into the society of Atlanta in the 1920s.

The Swan House was used as a set location for The Hunger Games: Catching Fire and The Hunger Games: Mockingjay, Part 2, serving as an equivalent to the White House within the alternate world of the films. The mansion was chosen for its classical style and antique details, as the directors wanted a location which "looked like it had been there forever."

The Swan House is listed on the National Register for Historic Places.

== In popular culture ==
- Swan House served as the finish line of the 19th season of The Amazing Race.
- It was used to film some scenes in the 2013 film The Hunger Games: Catching Fire, and in its 2015 sequel, The Hunger Games: Mockingjay, Part 2.
- It appears in the opening sequence of the 1980 movie Little Darlings.
- It was also to be used for "TCM Remembers 2014" on Turner Classic Movies.
- Swan House was also featured on The CW's soap opera series Dynasty.
- The exterior and interior of the house was used as Crump Manor in Haunted Mansion.
- The exterior of the house was used as Cinderella's Castle Descendants: The Rise of Red.

== Gallery ==
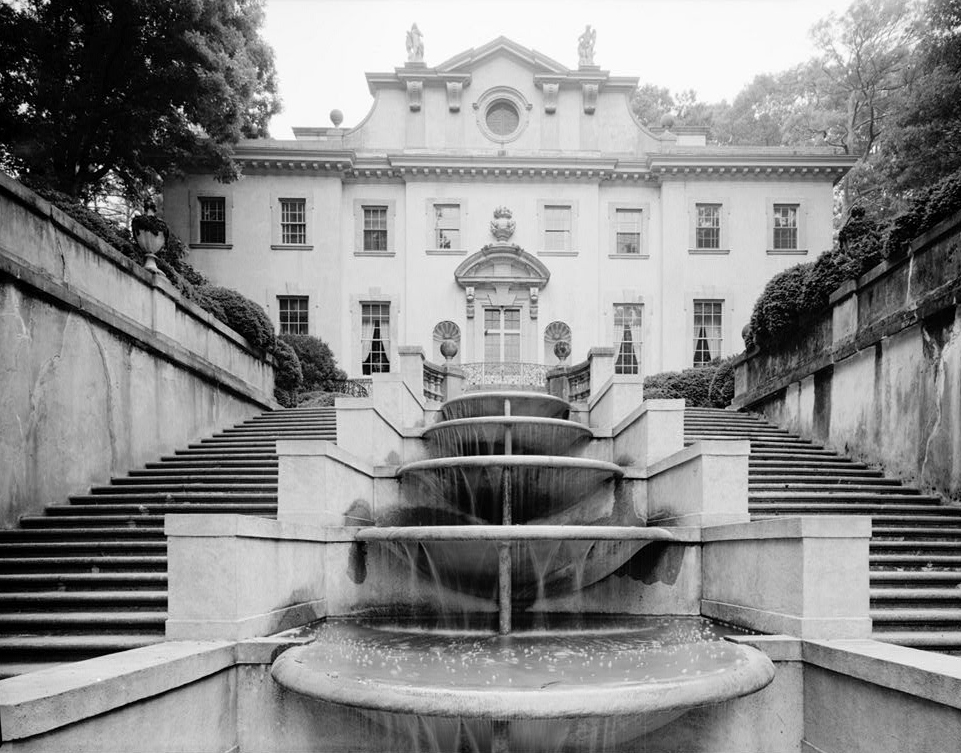
The Swan House in black and white

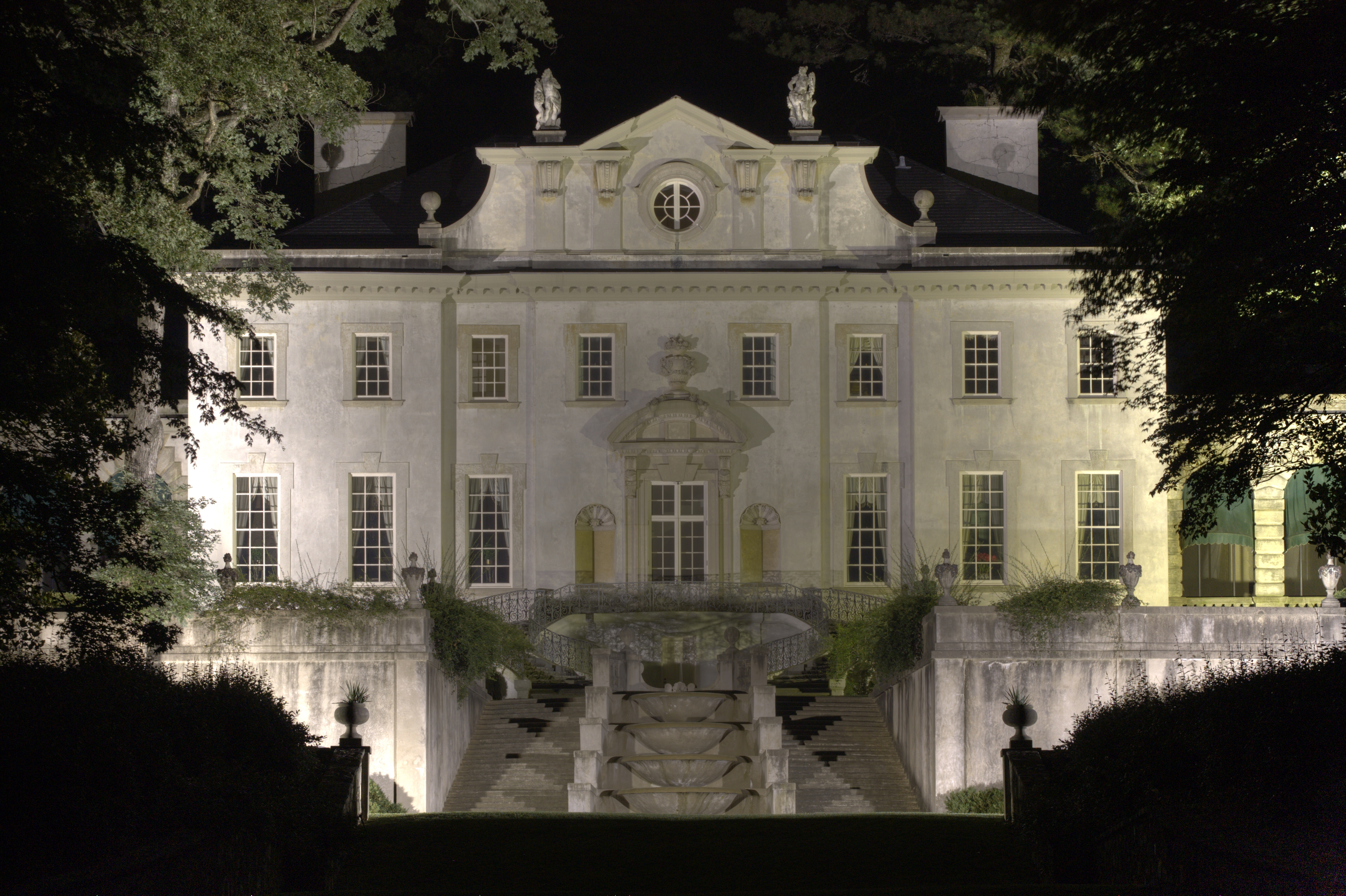
Night view

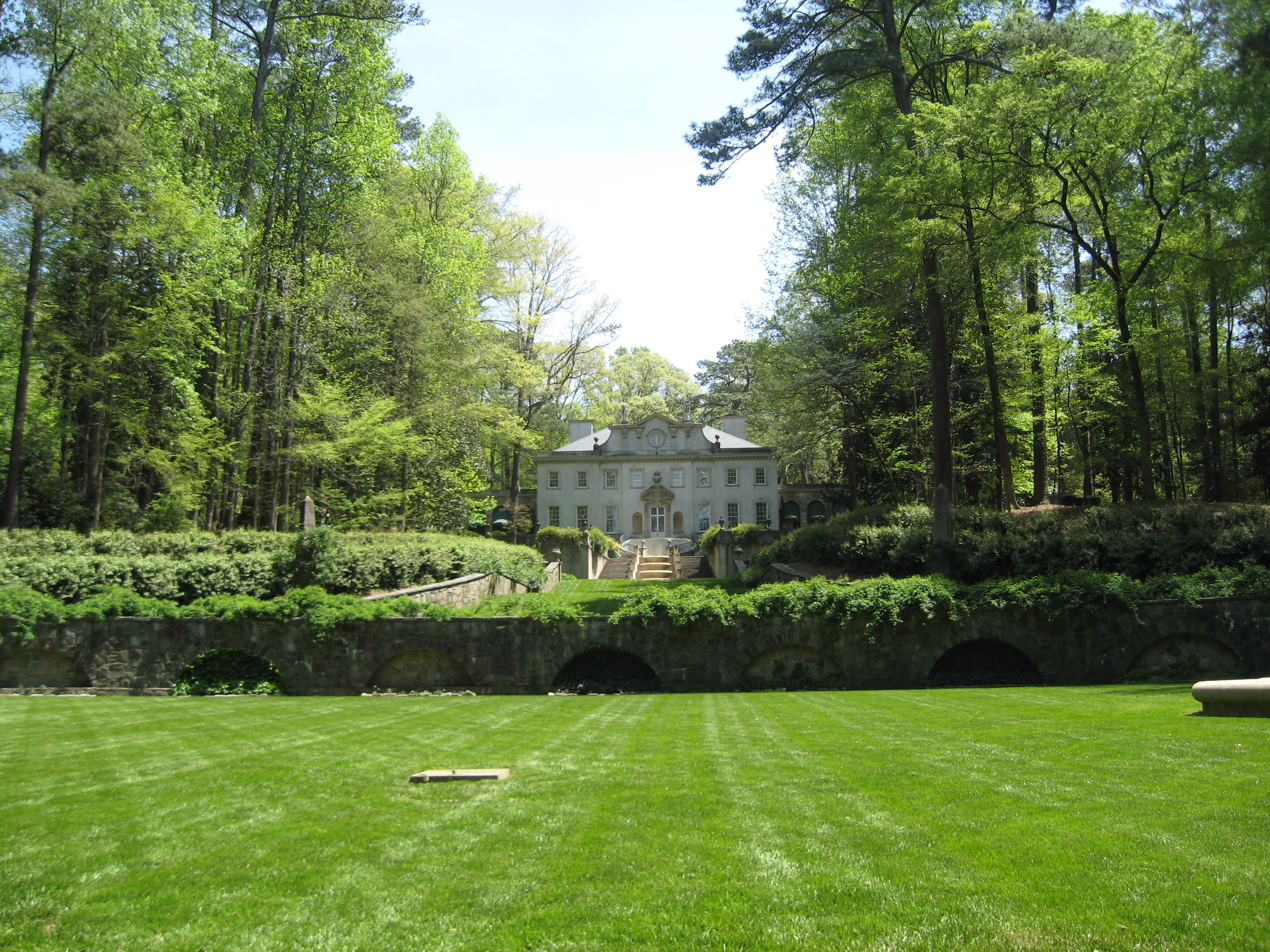
The house from afar

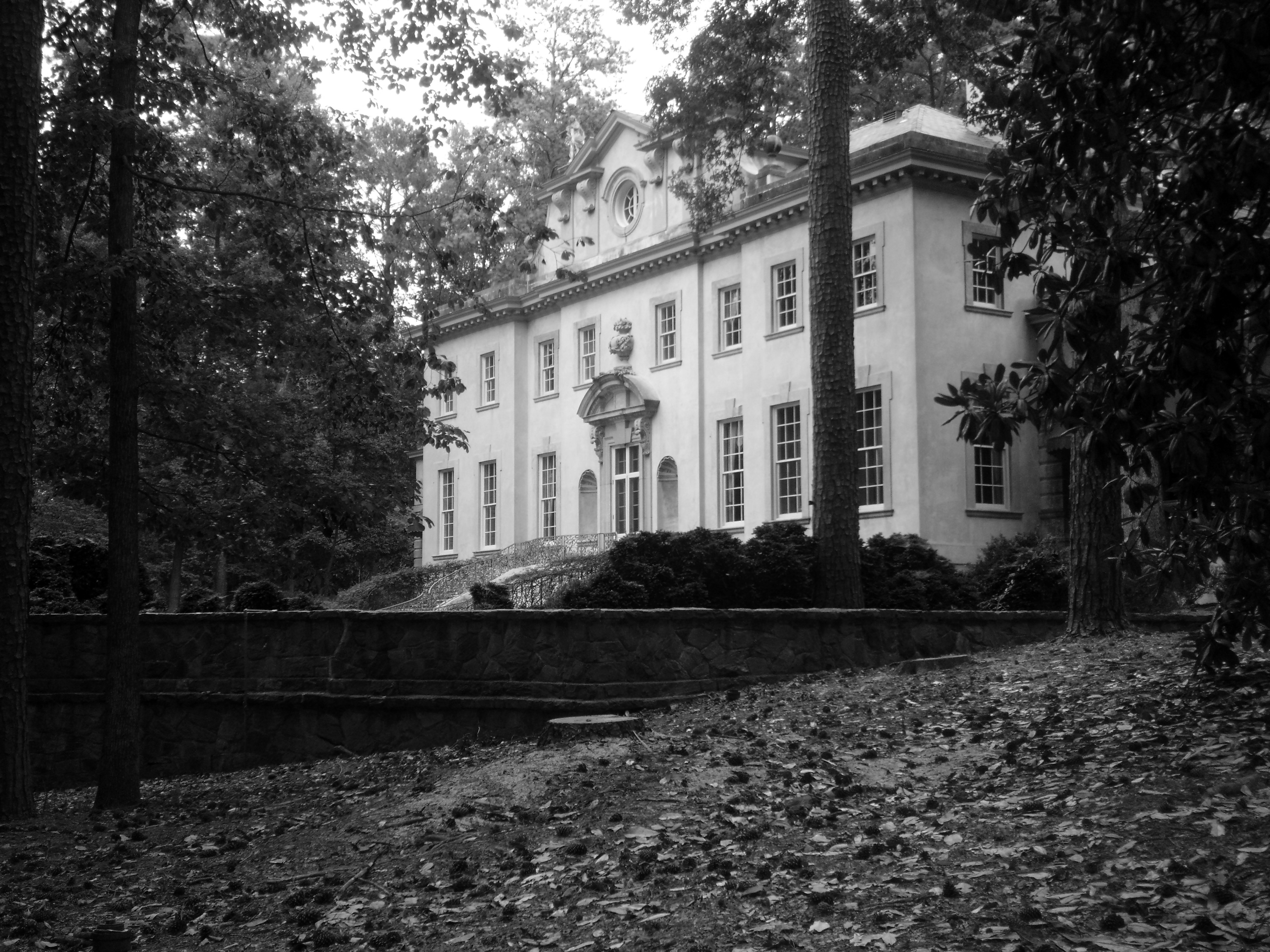
Swan House in black and white

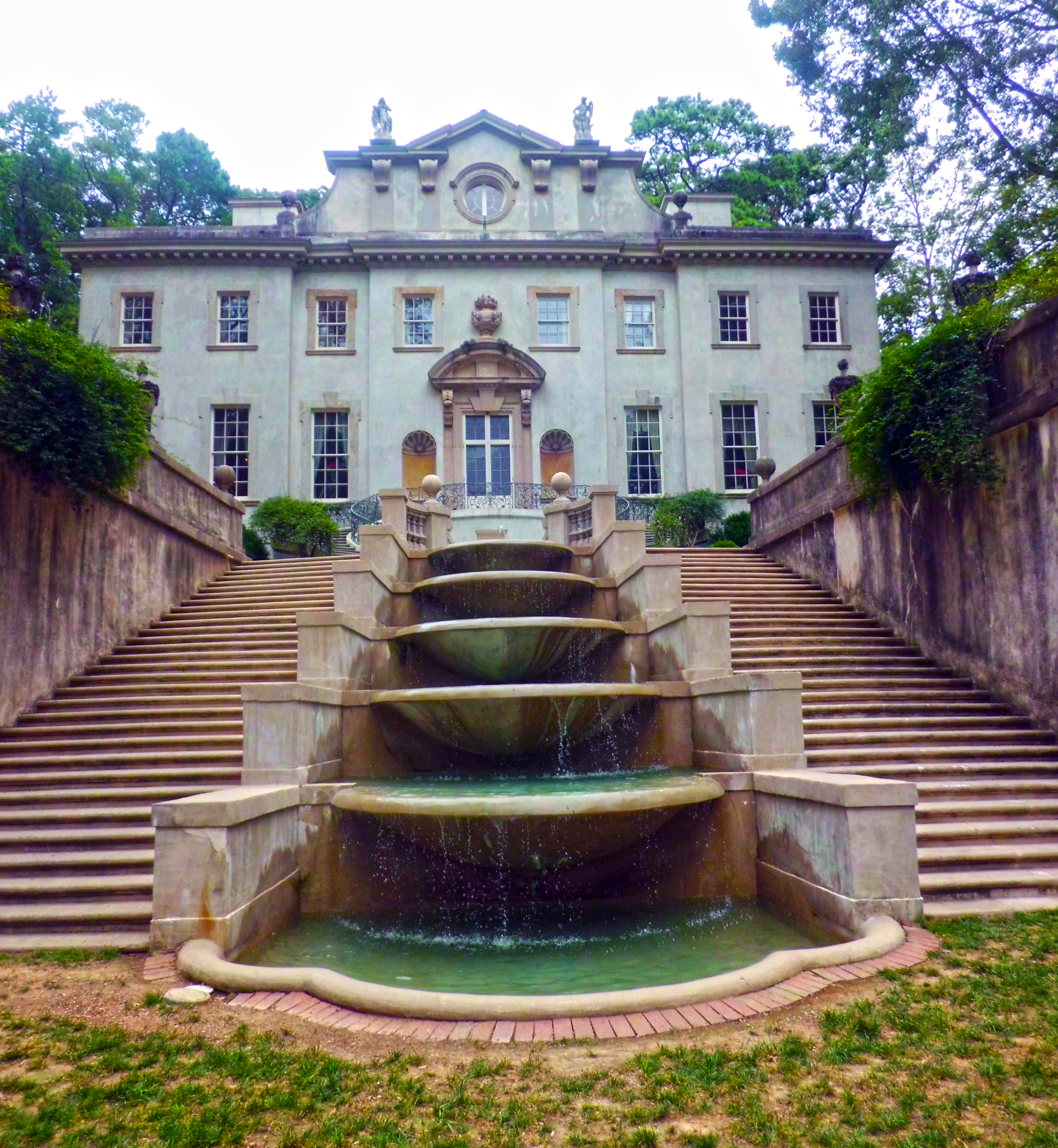
Cascading Fountain

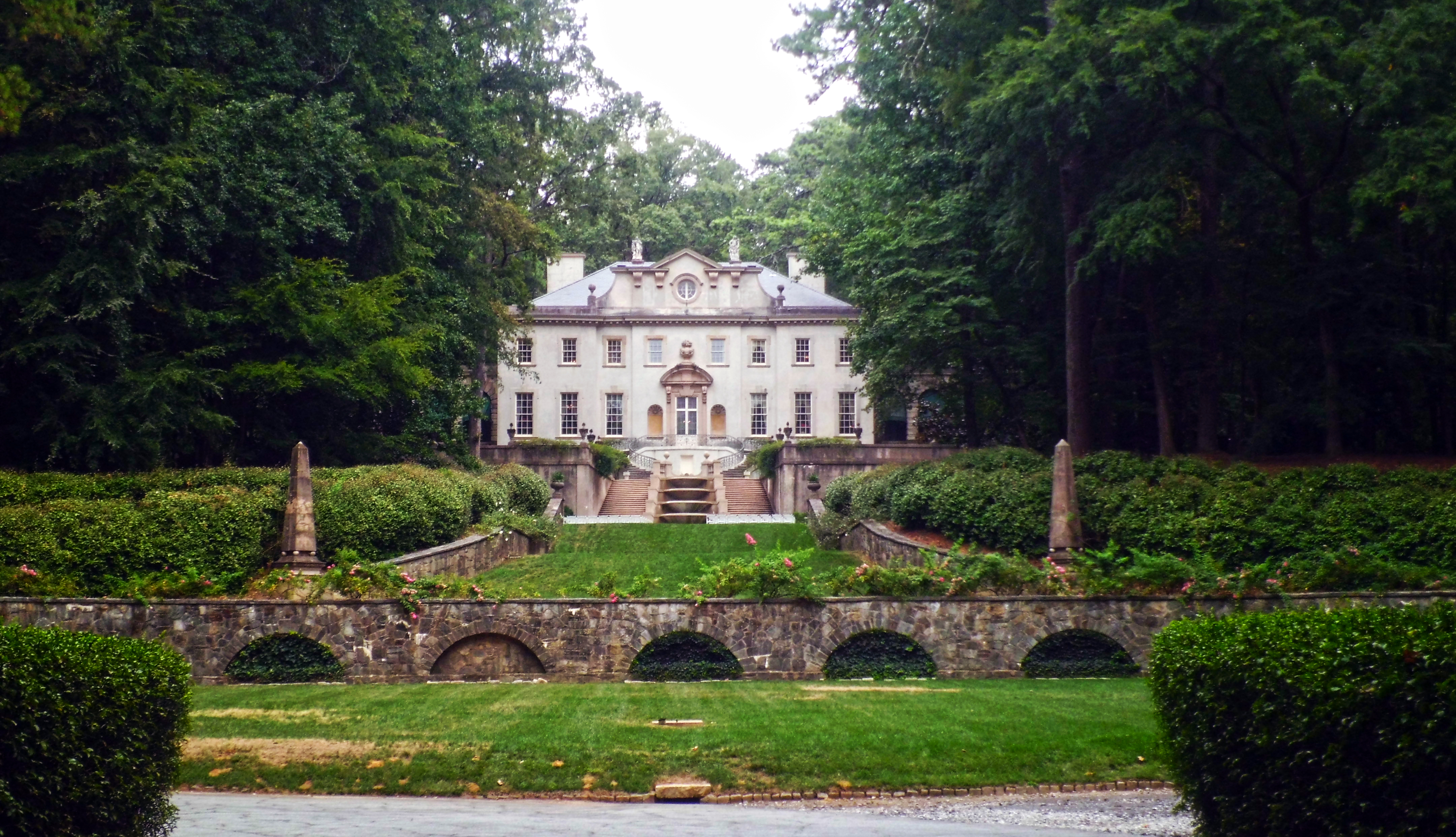
Wide view from bottom of hill

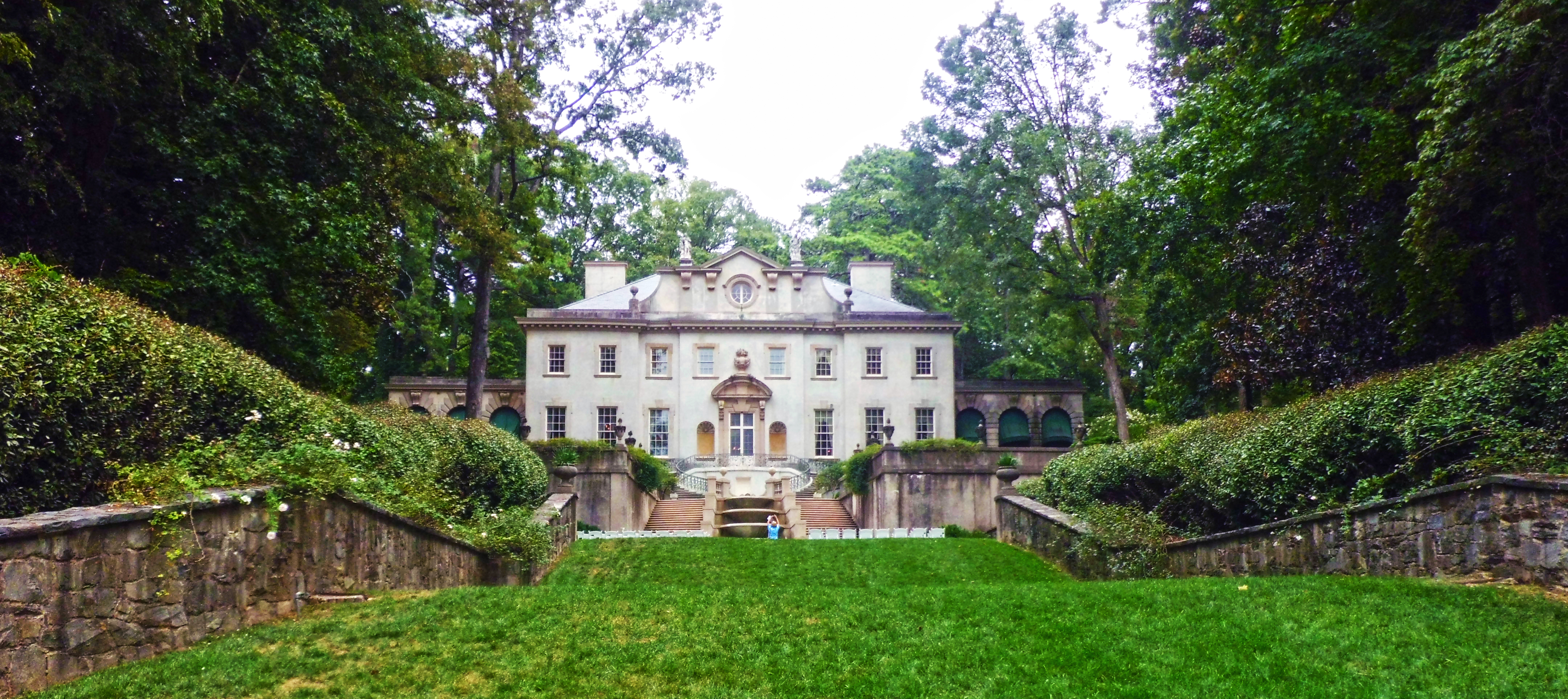
View of house with terraces and cascading fountain

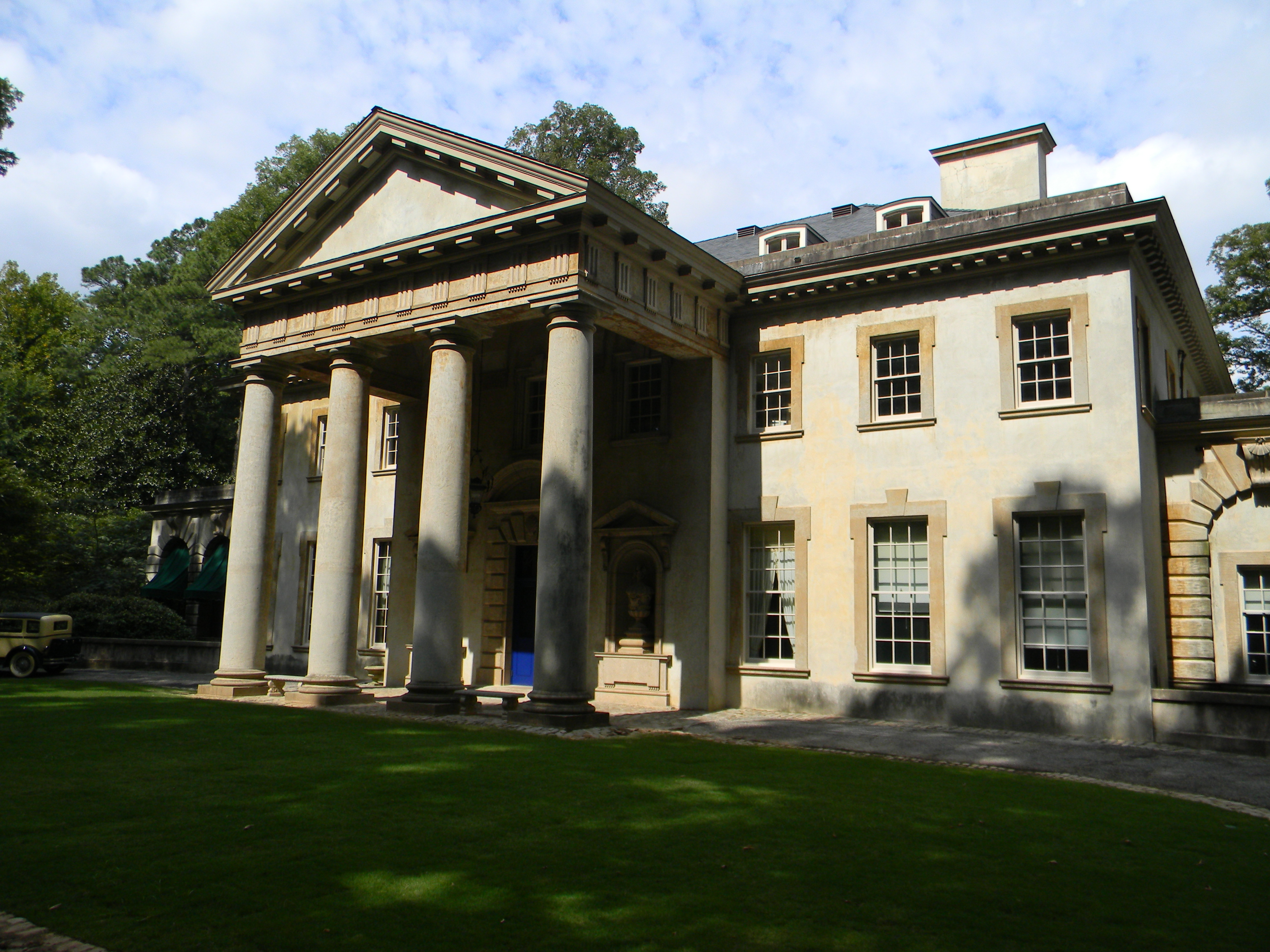
Front Entrance - August 2014

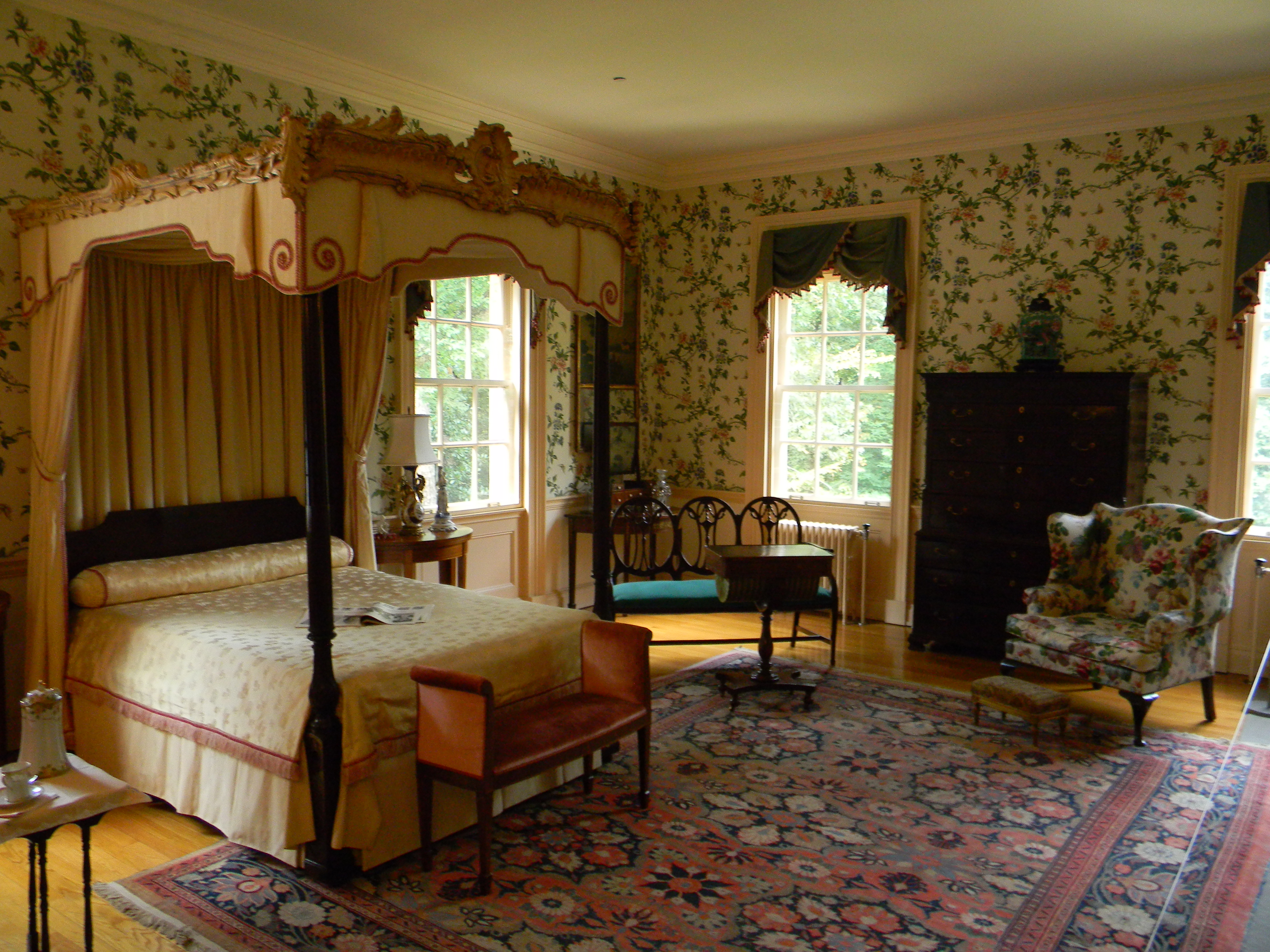
Swan House Bedroom - August 2014

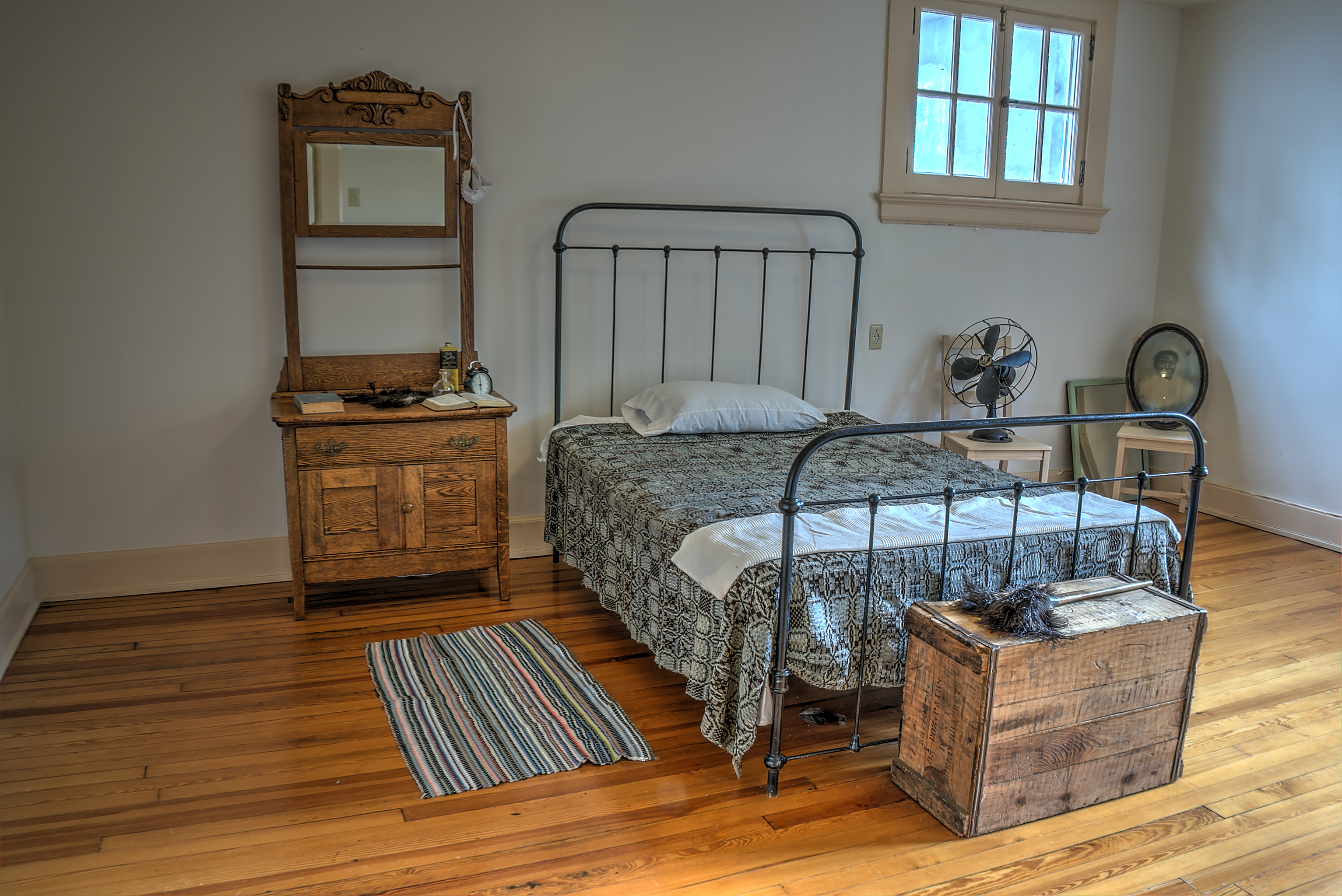
Upstairs bedroom

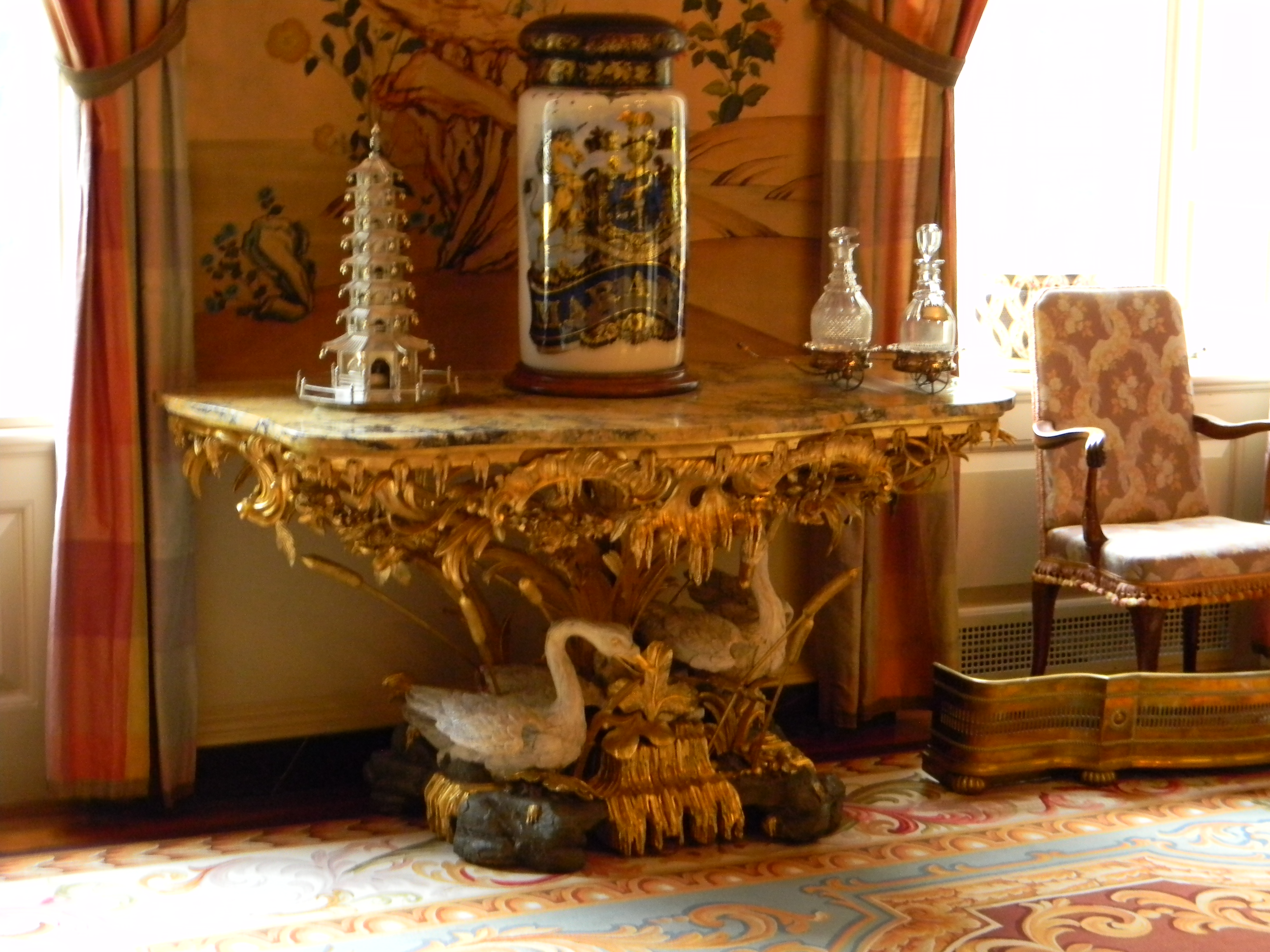
Swan Table - August 2014

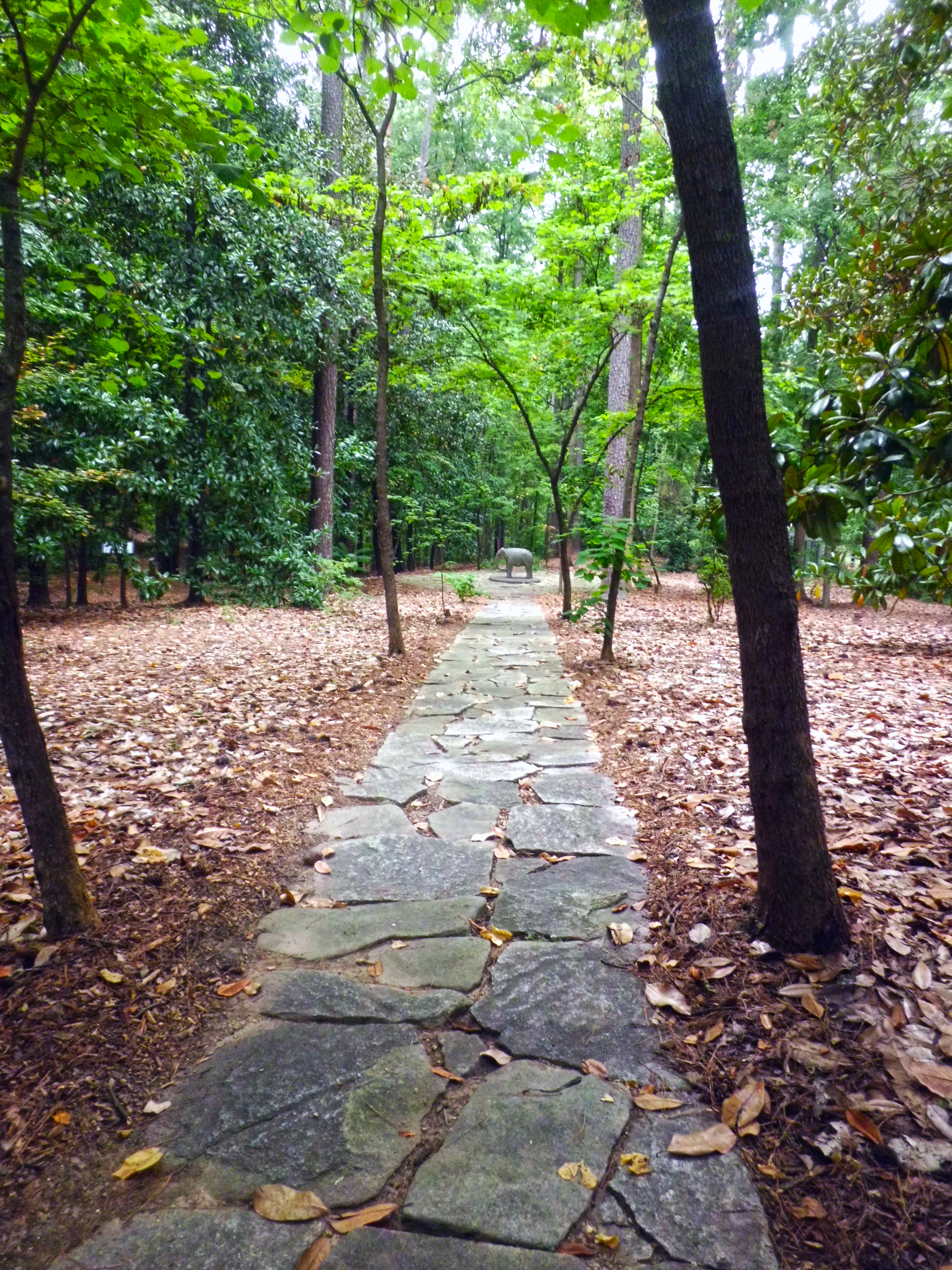
Path leading to Ambrose the Stone Elephant

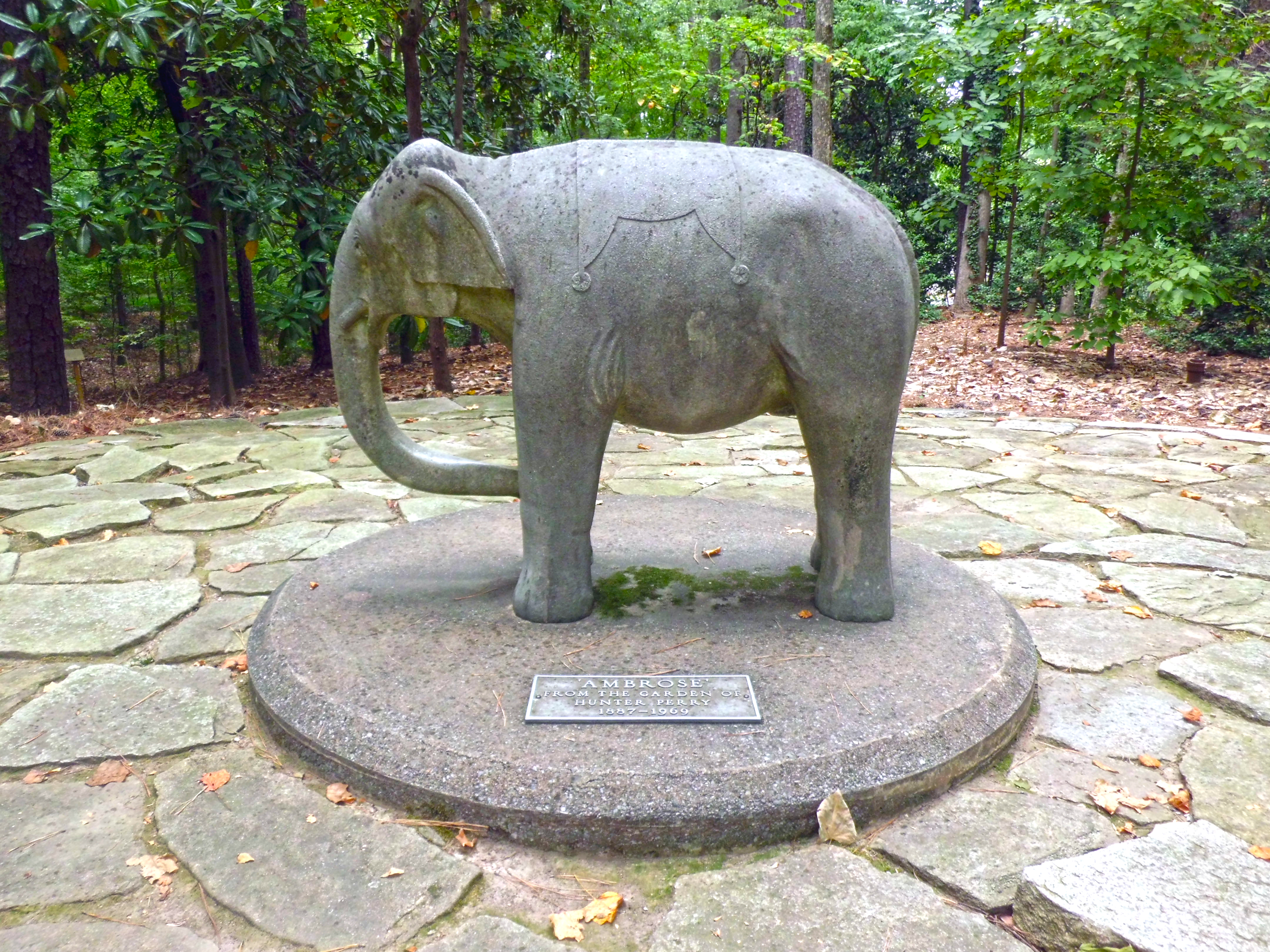
Ambrose the Stone Elephant

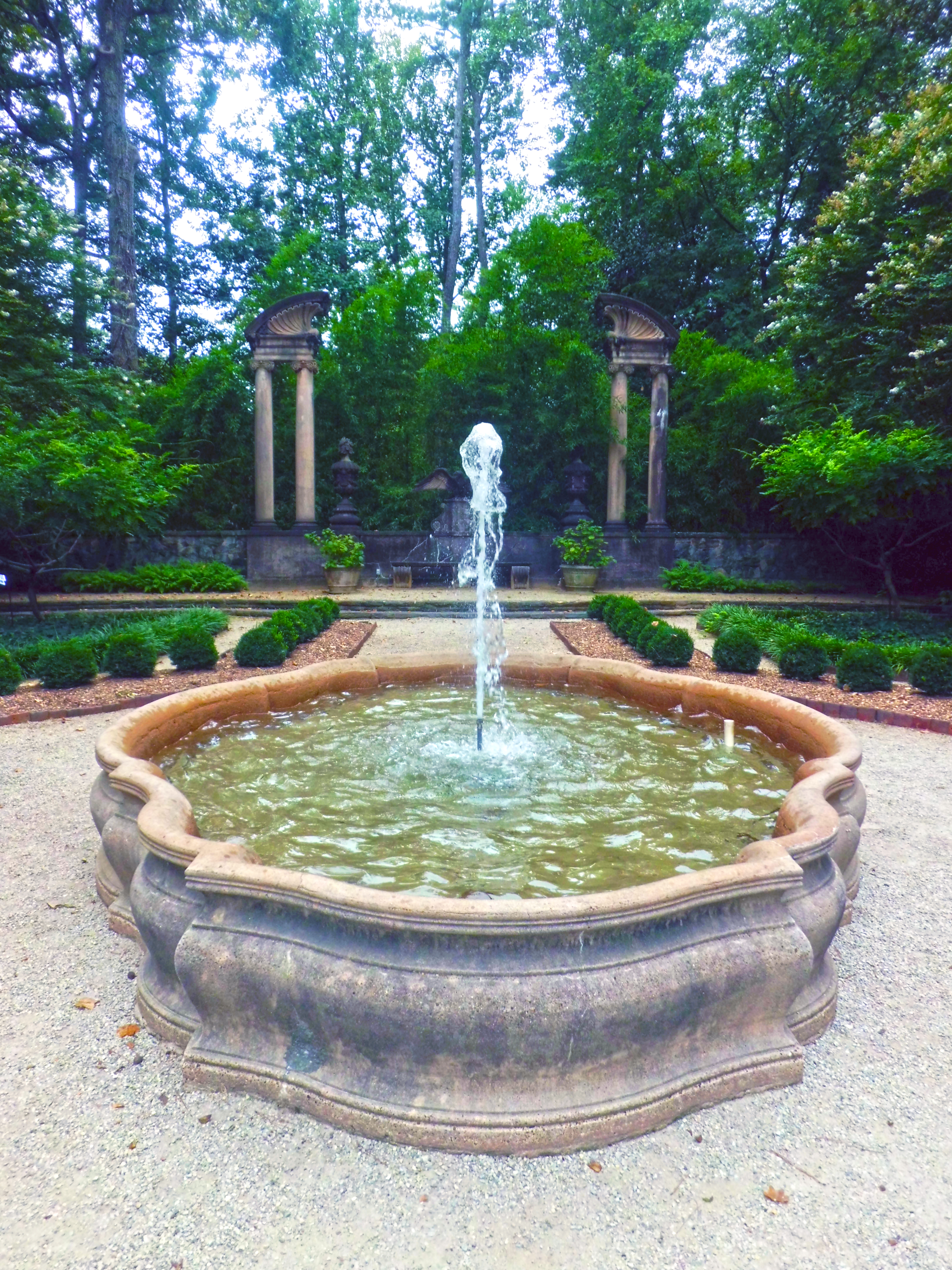
Fountain

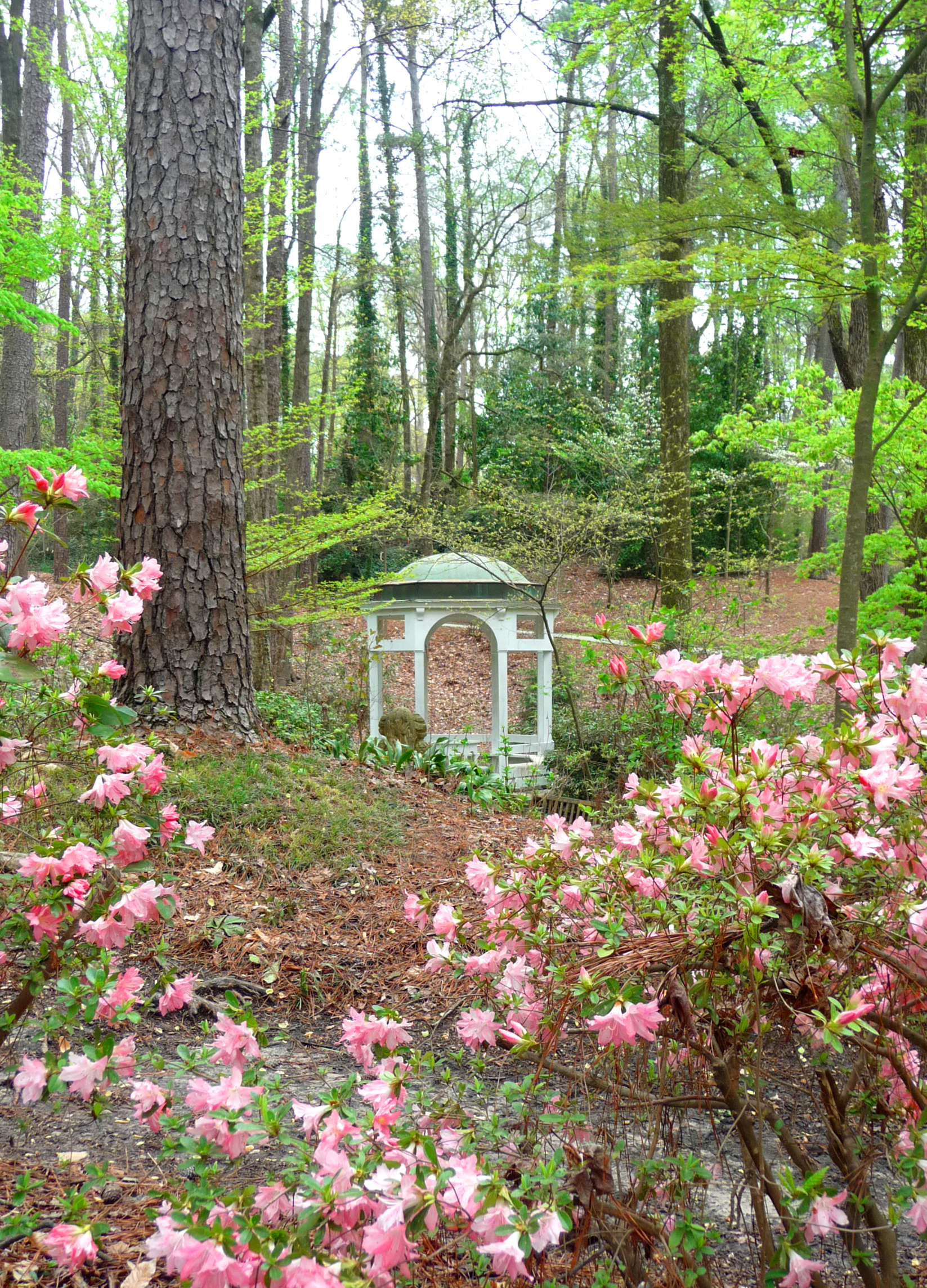
Cherry Sims Garden

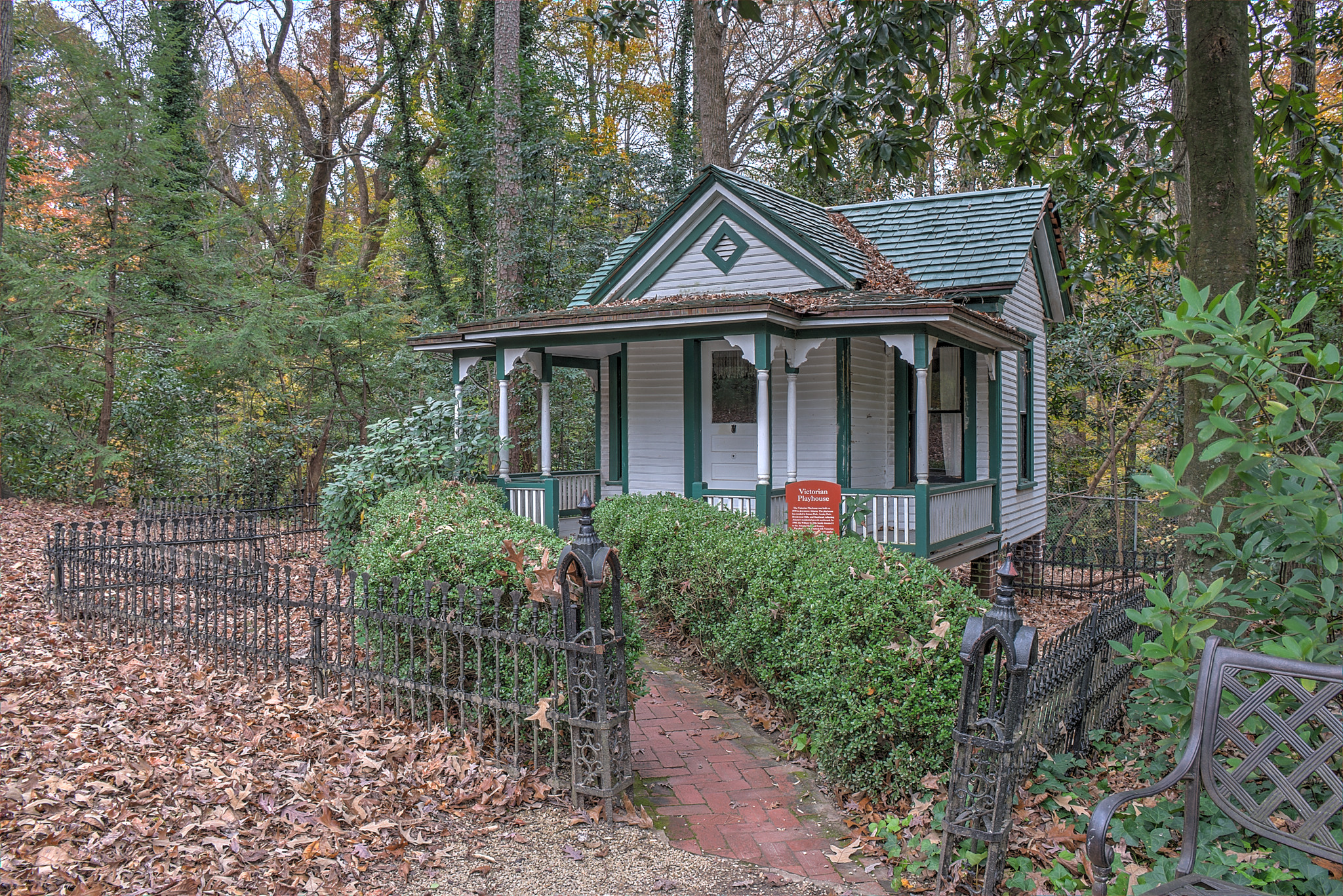
Victorian play house

== See also ==
- Tullie Smith House on the grounds of Swan House
