= Project architect =

In architecture, a project architect (PA) is an individual who is responsible for overseeing the architectural aspects of the development of a design, production of the construction documents (plans), and specifications, from which actively uses a variety of intellectual disciplines in engineering, law, and business, for the projects of the architectural environment.

== Roles ==
The position generally involves coordinating the needs of a client, designer, technical staff, outside consultants such as structural, civil, and mechanical engineers, as well as interior designers and landscape architects.

The specific tasks of a project architect are usually associated with architectural design, construction materials and methods and the production of construction documents (floor plans, elevations, etc.). Other responsibilities range from client relations to zoning and building code management, material specifications, maintaining quality control by checking and making revisions to shop drawings.

The project architect can also assume the role of the project manager (PM) in a small studio, but typically, the project architect is only responsible for the design management of a building project, assisted by interns and other staff. A project architect is typically registered as an architect in the state in which they are performing the role but not always required to be. Intern architects may perform the role under the supervision of a registered architect but may not sign or seal legal documents.

The project architect may, but does not often, sign contracts, or seal construction documents or payment applications, which are most often legally signed and sealed by a state registered owner or partner of the architectural office. This liability is covered by the firm, and the legal responsibility for any architectural design errors and omissions ultimately falls on the registered architect; the owner or partner in an architectural firm.
