= Henry B. Tompkins House =

Historic house in Atlanta, US

- U.S. National Register of Historic Places
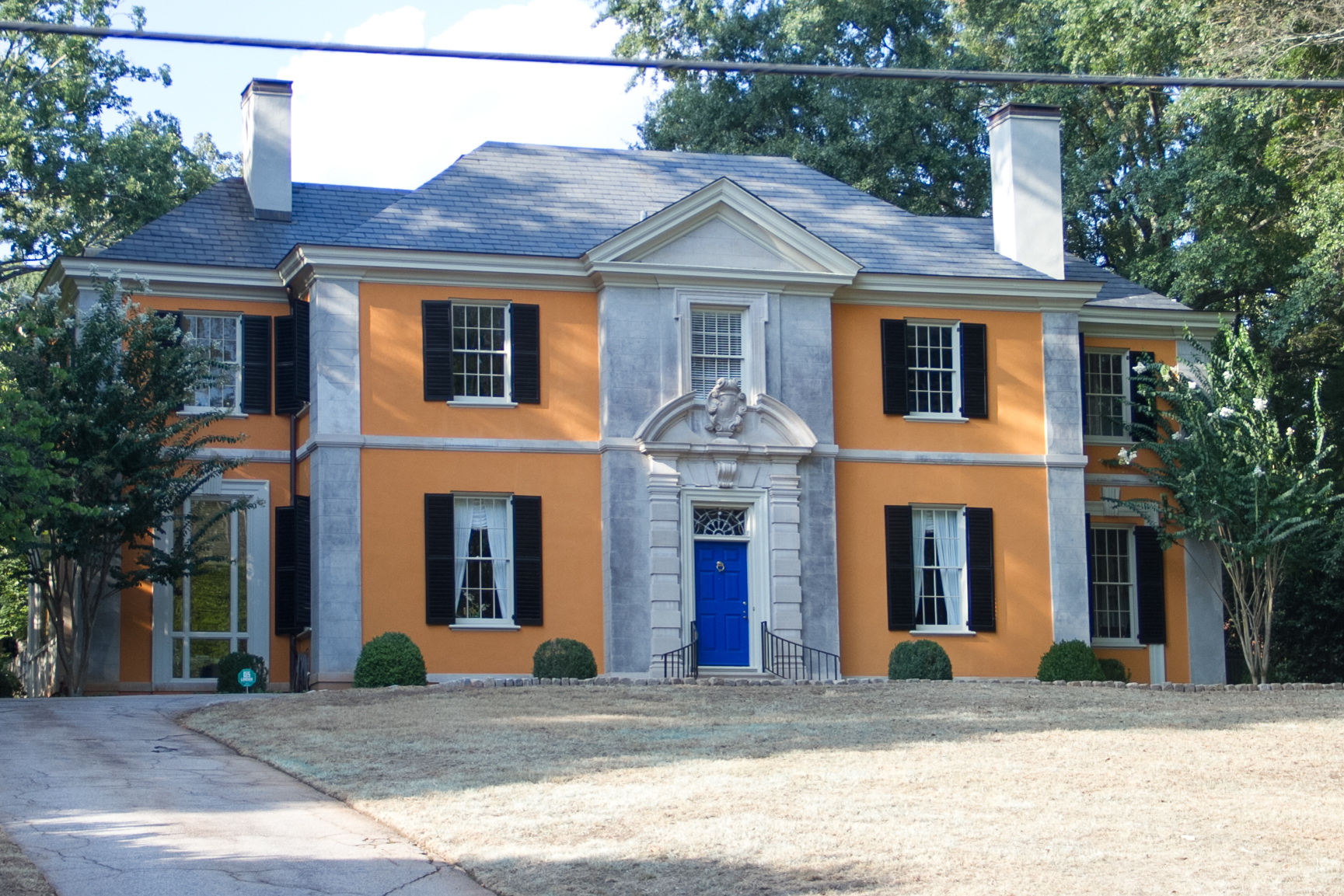

- Location within Georgia Location within the United States
- Location: 125 West Wesley Road, Atlanta, Georgia
- Coordinates: 33°49′45″N 84°23′29.5″W
- Area: less than one acre
- Built: 1922
- Architect: Hentz, Reid & Adler
- Architectural style: Colonial Revival, Palladian
- NRHP reference No.: 76000633
- Added to NRHP: December 12, 1976

The Henry B. Tompkins House is a historic home in Atlanta, Georgia, United States. Built in 1922, it was designed by Neel Reid and is listed on the National Register of Historic Places.

The house kept its original exterior appearance with gray stucco until 2010, when the Atlanta Journal-Constitution reported it had been painted bright orange.

The house is on West Wesley Road in the Peachtree Heights West neighborhood, an area with many other historic properties.
