= St. George's Episcopal Church (Griffin, Georgia) =

- U.S. National Register of Historic Places
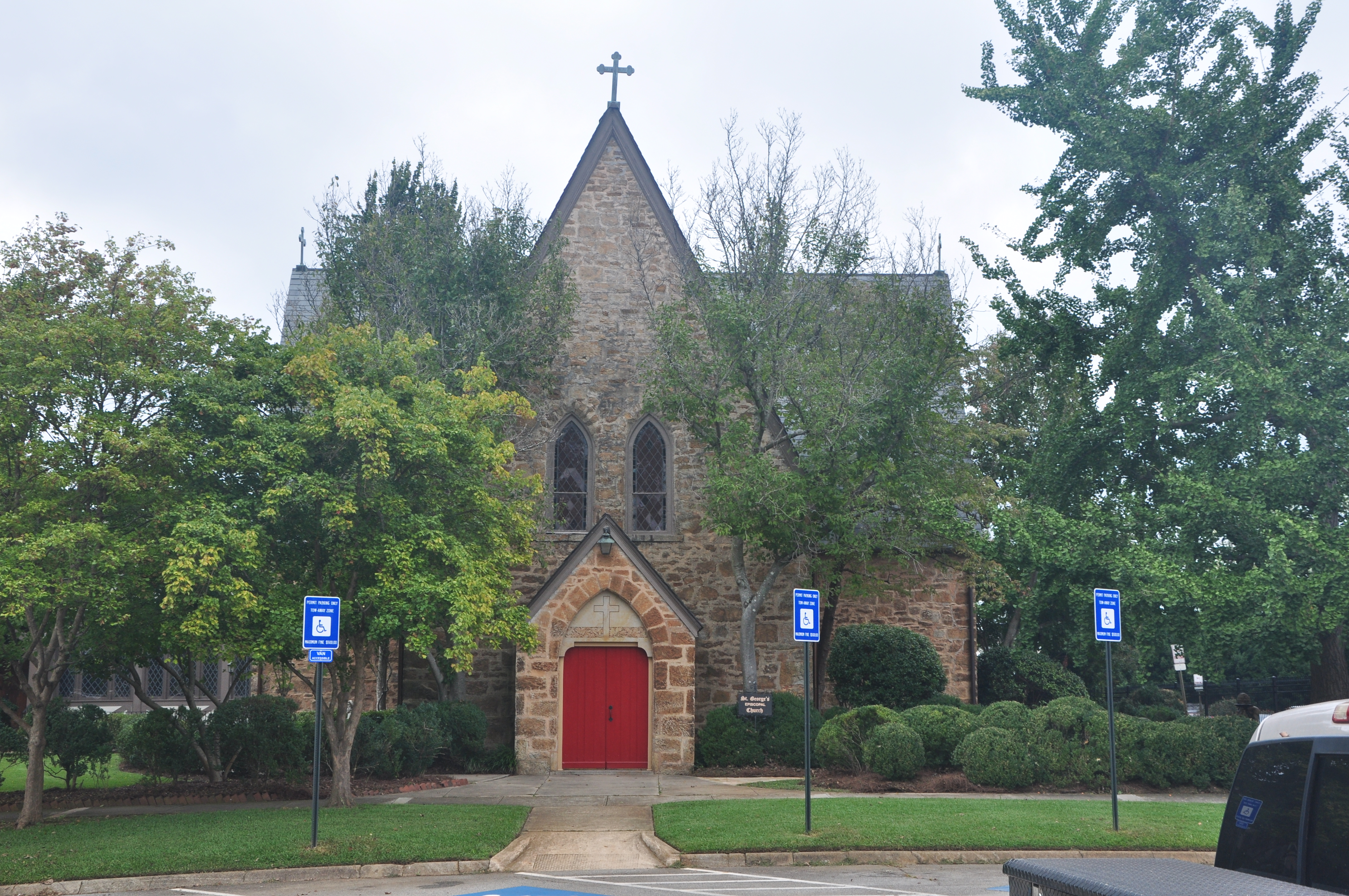

- Location within Georgia
- Location: 132 N. Tenth St., Griffin, Georgia
- Coordinates: 33°14′59″N 84°16′06″W
- Area: 1.6 acres (0.65 ha)
- Built: 1921
- Architect: Hentz, Reid, and Adler
- Architectural style: Late Gothic Revival
- NRHP reference No.: 94000284
- Added to NRHP: April 7, 1994

St. George's Episcopal Church is a historic Episcopal church in Griffin, Spalding County, Georgia. It was added to the National Register of Historic Places on April 7, 1994. It is located at 132 North Tenth Street. The congregation is part of the Episcopal Diocese of Atlanta.

In 2016, the church reported 499 members; in 2023, it reported 343 members. No membership statistics were reported in 2024 national parochial reports. Plate and pledge financial support reported by the church in 2024 was $592,667. Average Sunday Attendance (ASA) reported in 2024 was 130 persons. This was a relative decrease on ASA of 157 reported in 2016

== History ==
Construction of the church was delayed by the American Civil War and the American Reconstruction period. A lot for the church was bought on the corner of Tenth Street and Broad Street in 1868. In November 1869 the church's cornerstone was placed with the Bishop of Georgia officiating and services were held in April 1871. A rectory was built a few years later; it is now administration offices. In 1921 the Grantland Memorial Parish Hall was built. In 1962 the Education Wing was added and the original rectory remodeled. In May 1975 a sacristy was added for the Altar Guild. The church merged with St. Stephen's Episcopal Church, which served African Americans; the altar, pews and baptismal font from St. Stephen's were dedicated in 2003. A children's chapel was also added. St. George's sesquicentennial celebration was held in 2014.

== See also ==
- National Register of Historic Places listings in Spalding County, Georgia
