= 370 Riverside Drive =

Residential building in Manhattan, New York

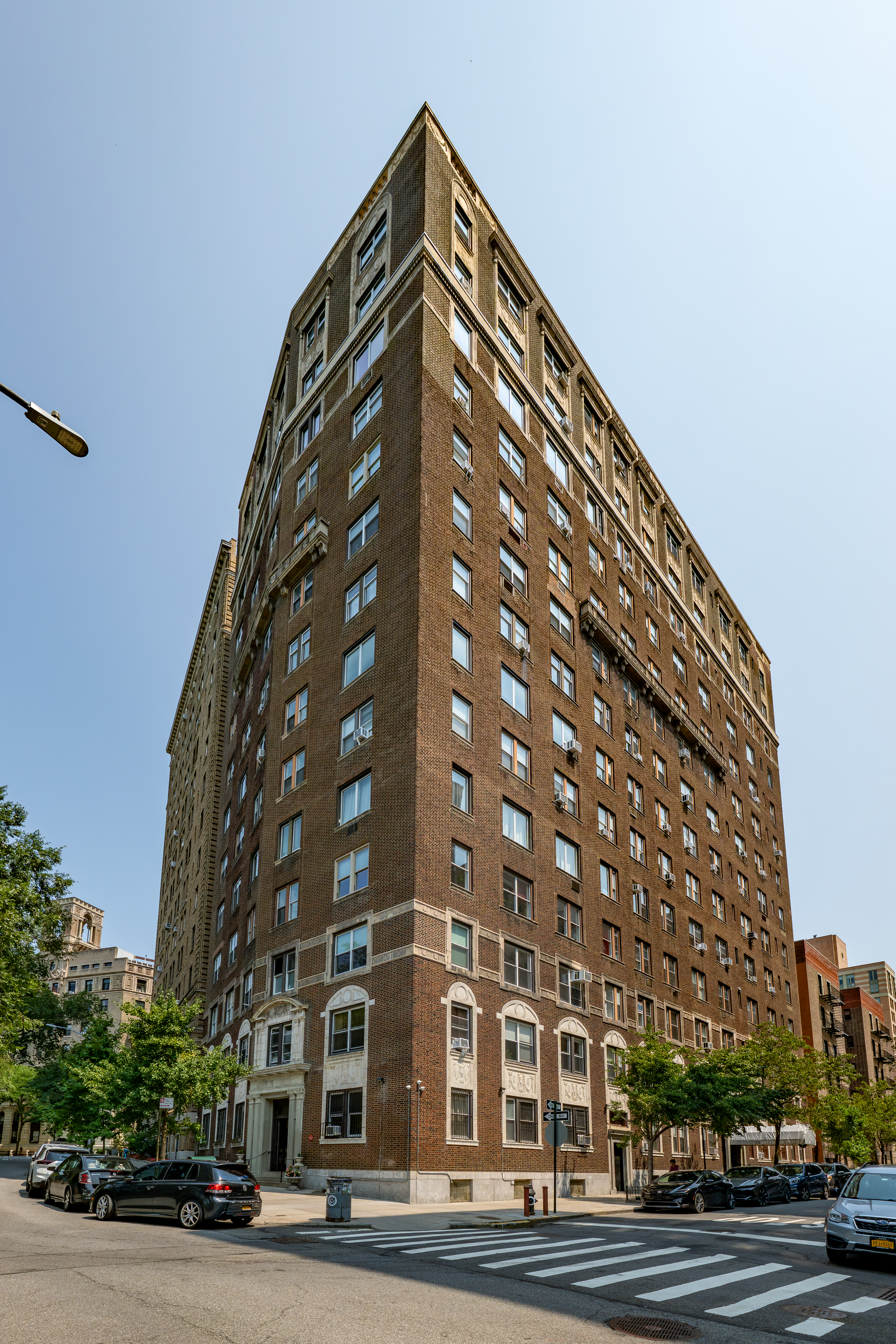
- (2026)

General information
- Type: Residential
- Architectural style: Georgian Revival
- Location: Upper West Side, Manhattan, New York City, United States
- Coordinates: 40.8043°N 73.9684°W
- Completed: 1922

Height
- Height: 160 feet (49 m)

Technical details
- Floor count: 15

Design and construction
- Architecture firm: Schwartz & Gross

370 Riverside Drive is a building on Riverside Drive along the north side of West 109th Street on the Upper West Side of Manhattan, New York City, United States. A number of notable people have lived here, including Hannah Arendt and her husband Heinrich Blücher, Grace Zia Chu (culinary figure), Clarence J. Lebel (inventor of fluorescent bulb), and Evelyn John Strachey (British politician), among others.

== History ==
The building at 370 Riverside Drive was erected in 1922 and 1923 for approximately $800,000. The architects were Simon Schwartz and Arthur Gross. It is located on a hill overlooking the Hudson River, and the Riverside Park. As a pre-war building its floor plans included a number of Classic Six apartments with high ceilings, a roof deck with views of the river, the park and George Washington Bridge. It is close to Columbia University campus. The 16 story building was completed in 1922 and converted to a cooperative in 1973.

The building changed ownership a number of times. On September 4, 1944 Samuel Knepper acquired 370 RSD from Pasquale Ferri. The price was not disclosed, but the building had a mortgage of $530,000 and was assessed at $650,000. On November 1, 1944, an investor bought 370 Riverside Drive still assessed at $650,000. On January 27, 1949, it was reported that the US Attorney's office had brought involuntary bankruptcy proceedings against Samuel Bronxmeyer, who was the owner of 370 Riverside Drive. He was charged with milking bankers and other parties by use of his many properties, including the building where he lived. By August 11, 1949, Henry Payson purchased 370 Riverside Drive from H. B. Management Corporation for cash above a $489,000 mortgage. The property was assessed at $605,000. H. B.Management acquired the parcel through foreclosure proceedings on August 3 against Samuel Bronxmeyer. On January 9, the Jason Realty Company bought the rent-controlled 75-apartment 370 Riverside Drive from the estate of Joseph Ross for an undisclosed amount of cash over a $600,000 mortgage. The building sits on an irregular 160 by 71 foot plot with an assessment of $625,000.

The building was incorporated as a cooperative apartment building in 1973.

The building is particularly notable, being mentioned in The New York Times 63 times.

== Gallery ==
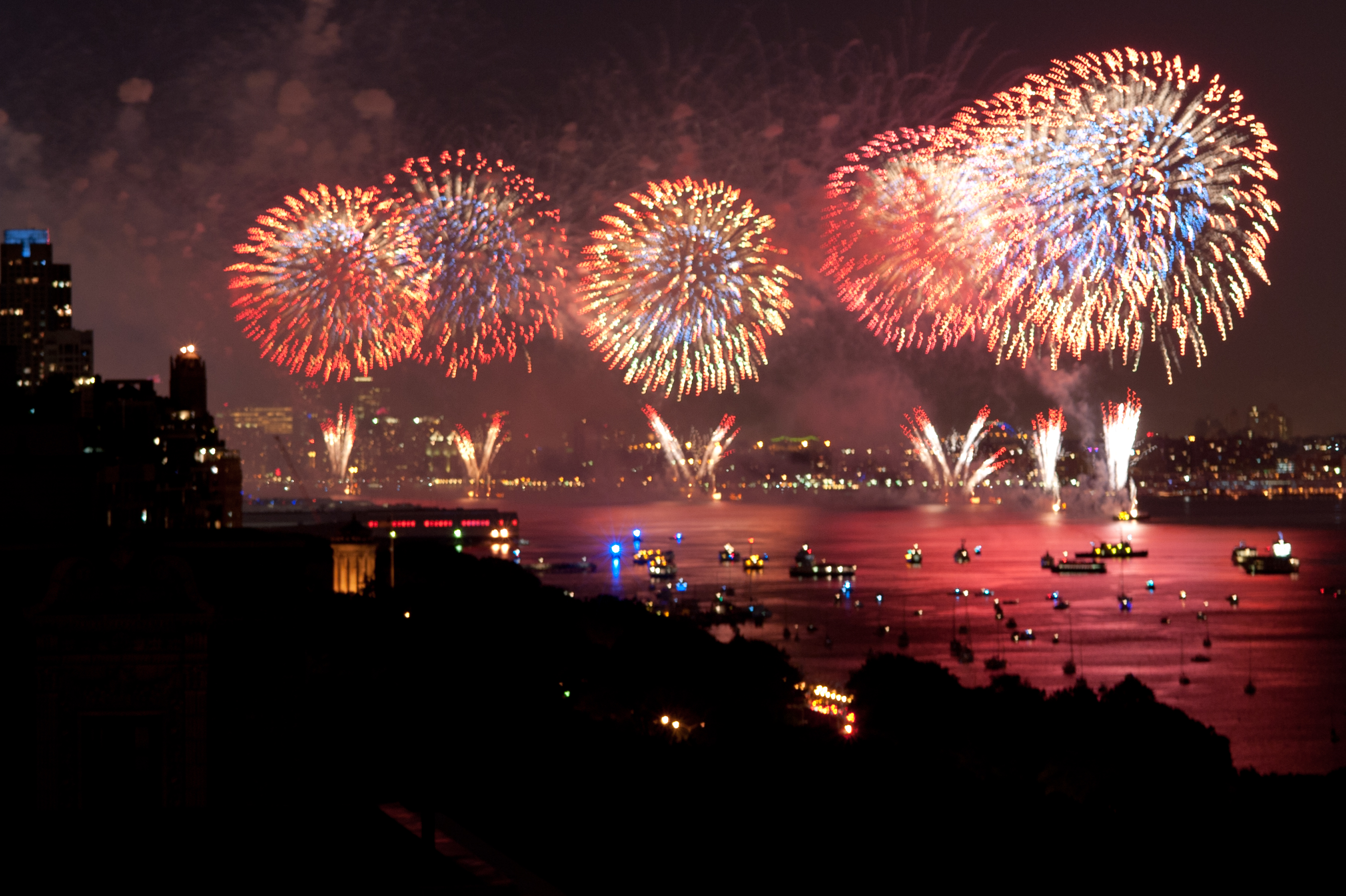
Red

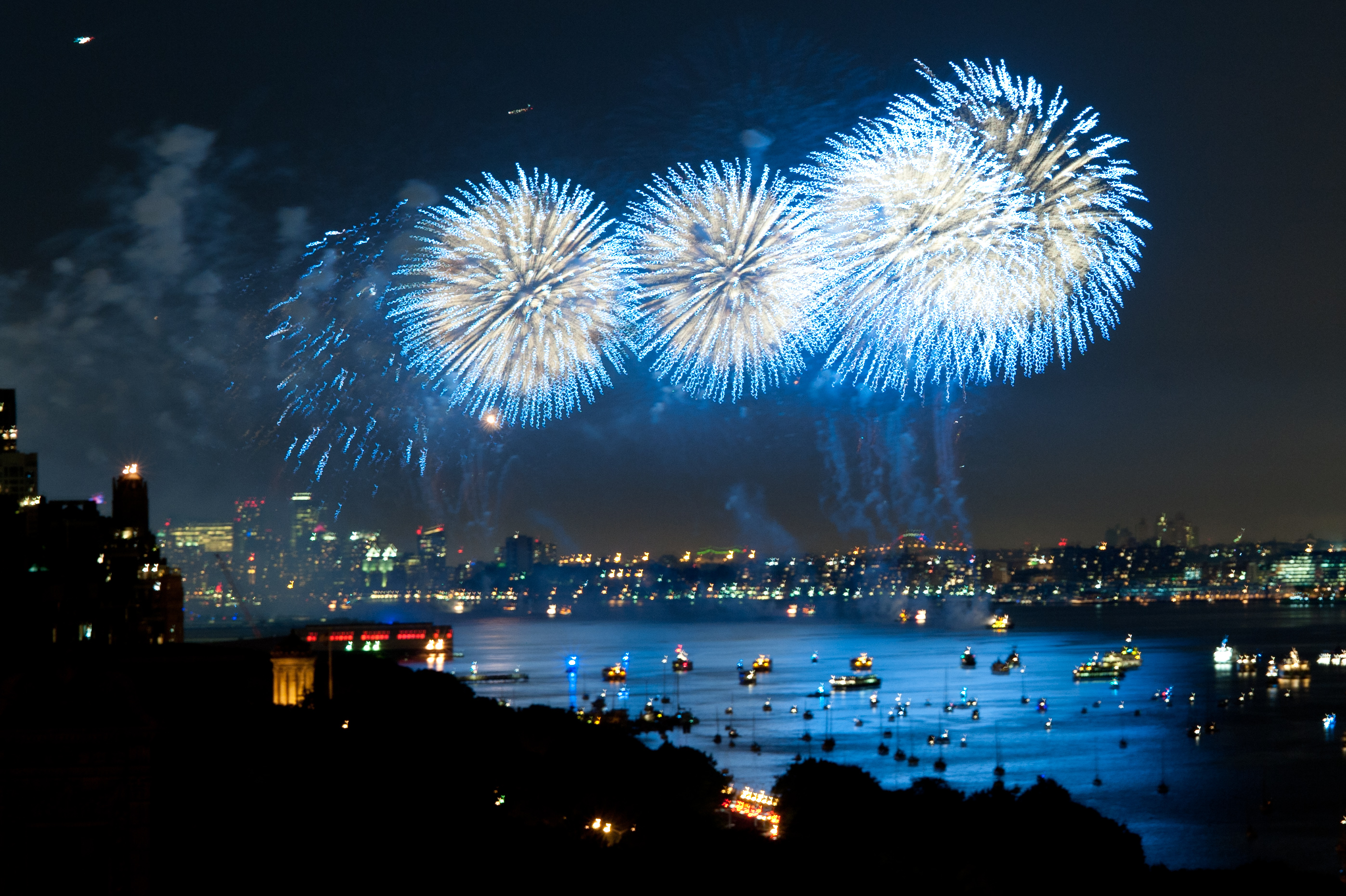
Blue

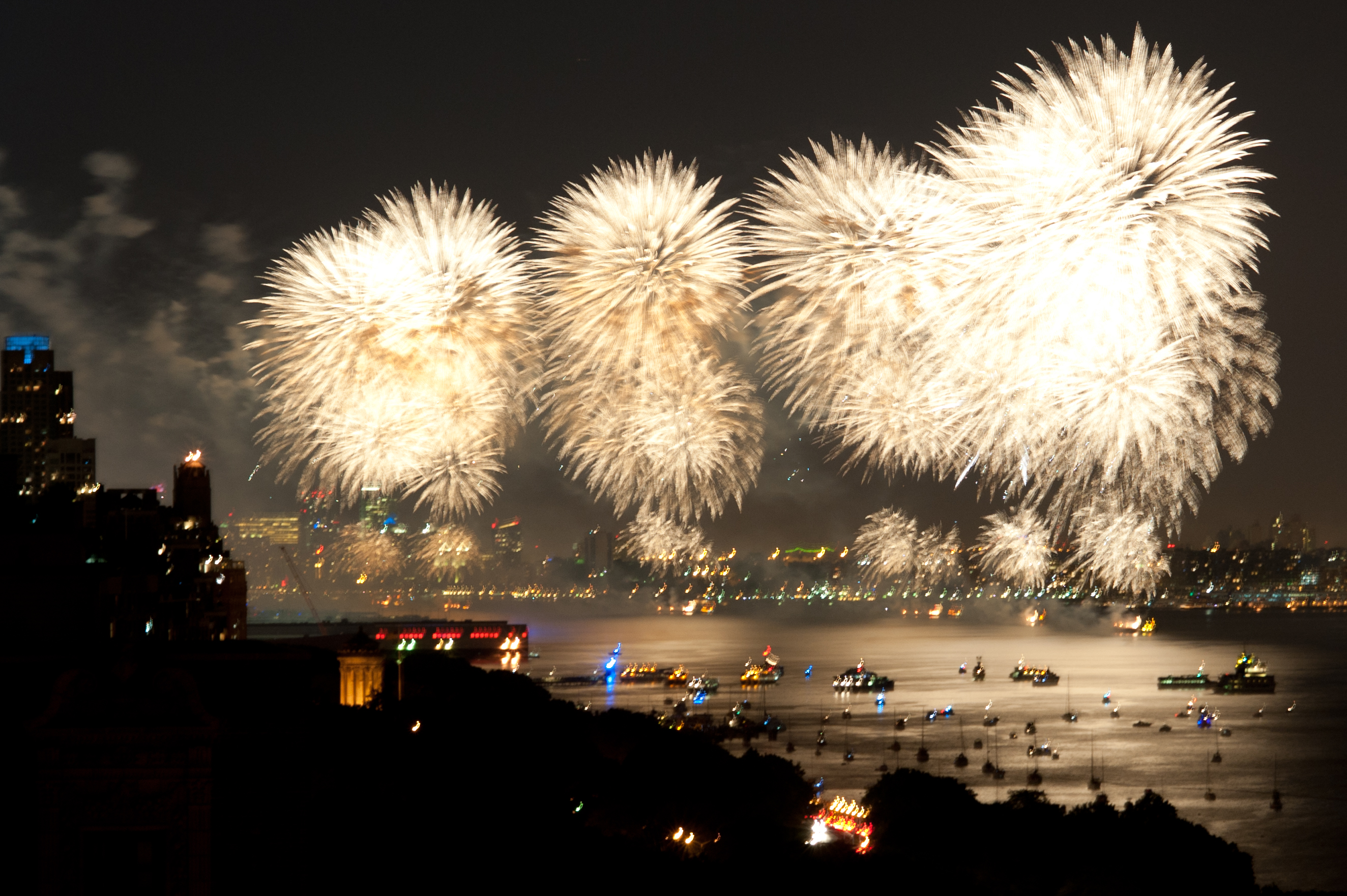
White

== Notable residents ==
- Hannah Arendt, political theorist, lived in the building from 1959 until her death in 1975.
- Lawrence Blochman, American detective story writer and translator
- Seymour C.Y. Cheng, diplomat
- Grace Zia Chu, culinary figure and cookbook author advertised "Madame Chu's Chinese Cooking Classes" as listed at 370 Riverside drive, 6B.
- Shelby Millard Harrison, director of the Russell Sage Foundation and also in charge of the Babe Ruth Foundation, and an author
- C. J. Lebel, held 10 patents, including a patent on fluorescent lamp
- Morris Lichtenstein, rabbi, co-founder of the Society of Jewish Science, husband of Tehilla Lichtenstein, also co-founder of SJS
- Henry Pfeiffer, president of William R. Warner & Co. (later known as Warner-Lambert), pharmaceutical manufacturer and philanthropist
- Norman Mills Price, American illustrator, lived in the building as well
- Evelyn John Strachey, British Secretary of State for War, writer and British politician, circa 1935
- Robert G. Thompson, received Distinguished Service Cross for valor in World War II and the chairman of the Communist Party in New York State
- Frank H. Warder, New York State Superintendent of Banks
- Robert Kurt Woetzel, professor of international law (circa 1961)
- Ernest Hunter Wright, professor at Columbia, a chairman of English Institute at Columbia (1942–1946)
- Martin Gutzwiller, quantum and particle physicist
