= Victory, New York =

Victory is the name of some towns and villages in the U.S. state of New York:

- Victory, Cayuga County, New York
- Victory, Saratoga County, New York (A small village in the town of Saratoga, New York)
