= Ethel Harpst =

American educator and caregiver

- Born: October 27, 1883; Georgia, United States
- Died: January 12, 1967 (aged 83); Montgomery, Alabama, United States
- Resting place: Greenwood Cemetery; Cedartown, Georgia
- Occupation: Educator

Ethel Elizabeth Harpst (October 27, 1883 – January 12, 1967) was an American educator, caregiver, and founder of the Harpst House in Cedartown, Georgia.

She moved from Boaz, Alabama to Cedartown, Georgia, then a mill village, in 1914 after being appointed to serve in the town's Goodyear Mill Village by the Methodist Women's Home Missionary Society, replacing Bertha Addington. Harpst cared for the sick in Cedartown, which was in the midst of outbreaks of scarlet fever, typhoid fever, influenza, and tuberculosis. She also was a teacher, giving classes on how to read and write. Her activities were based out of the Deborah McCarty Settlement House, which was modeled after Jane Addams's and Ellen Gates Starr's Hull House in Chicago.

Harpst established the Harpst Home in March 1924, which had been purchased, renovated, and given to Harpst by Cedartown city clerk J. C. Walker. Located on Bradford Hill, the home quickly needed to be expanded, and Harpst traveled to raise funds for this purpose. In 1927 James Hall was constructed; at the time this three-story brick building was the tallest in Cedartown. The Great Depression caused even more strain on the still-growing Harpst Home. A new boys' dorm was opened in 1933. Through Harpst's relentless fundraising and with the assistance of New York City couple Henry Pfeiffer and Annie Merner Pfeiffer, the home expanded over the next twenty years, adding more buildings and acquiring hundreds of acres of land.

The work at the Settlement goes on with night school, day nursery, clinics, classes for men, women, boys, and girls, visiting the sick, comforting the sorrowing, and many other things "too numerous to mention."

— Ethel Harpst, The Woman's Home Missionary Society of the Methodist Episcopal Church, Forty-Fifth Annual Report for the Year 1925–1926

In 1984, the Women's Division of the United Methodist Church combined the Harpst Home with the Sarah Murphy Home to create the Murphy-Harpst Children's Centers in Cedartown. Murphy-Harpst continues to operate to this day, helping care for hundreds of abused children in partnership with the Georgia Department of Family and Children's Services and the Georgia Department of Juvenile Justice. Harpst retired in 1951 at the age of 68.

She was awarded the Good Neighbor Orchid Award in 1948 in an appearance on the radio show Breakfast in Hollywood. In 2012 she was inducted into the Georgia Women of Achievement Hall of Fame.
