= National Register of Historic Places listings in Polk County, Georgia =

Location of Polk County in Georgia

This is a list of properties and districts in Polk County, Georgia that are listed on the National Register of Historic Places (NRHP).

This National Park Service list is complete through NPS recent listings posted June 26, 2026.

== Current listings ==
	Name on the Register	Image	Date listed	Location	City or town	Description
1	Cedartown Commercial Historic District	Cedartown Commercial Historic District	December 24, 1992 (#92001715)	Roughly bounded by East Avenue and South Philpot, Gibson and College Streets; 34°00′40″N 85°15′20″W	Cedartown	
2	Cedartown Waterworks-Woman's Building-Big Spring Park Historic District	Cedartown Waterworks-Woman's Building-Big Spring Park Historic District	December 7, 2000 (#00001475)	Junction of Wissahickon Avenue and Bradford Street; 34°00′52″N 85°15′31″W	Cedartown	
3	Euharlee Elementary School	Euharlee Elementary School	February 25, 2026 (#100012652)	120 Gordon Street; 34°00′06″N 85°03′38″W	Rockmart	
4	Hawkes Children's Library	Hawkes Children's Library	November 24, 1980 (#80001223)	North College Street; 34°00′47″N 85°15′23″W	Cedartown	
5	Northwest Cedartown Historic District	Northwest Cedartown Historic District	April 30, 2008 (#08000354)	Roughly bounded by Jule Peek Avenue, Spruce Street, Wissahickon Avenue and Marshall Street; 34°01′12″N 85°15′48″W	Cedartown	
6	Rockmart Downtown Historic District	Rockmart Downtown Historic District	June 24, 2009 (#09000458)	Roughly bounded by Water, Beauregard, Marble, and Elm Streets; 33°59′48″N 85°03′13″W	Rockmart	
7	Rockmart Woman's Club	Rockmart Woman's Club	June 20, 1995 (#95000738)	301 North Marble Street, between College and Ivy; 33°59′58″N 85°02′56″W	Rockmart	
8	St. James' Episcopal Church	St. James' Episcopal Church	October 7, 2019 (#100004293)	302 and 308 West Ave. 34°00′41″N 85°15′28″W	Cedartown	
9	South Philpot Street Historic District	South Philpot Street Historic District	November 2, 2011 (#11000776)	Roughly bounded by S. Philpot St., East Ave, E. Ware & Park Sts. 34°00′44″N 85°15′05″W	Cedartown	
