= Rockmart Woman's Club =

Hhistoric women's club in Georgia, US

- U.S. National Register of Historic Places
- U.S. Historic district – Contributing property
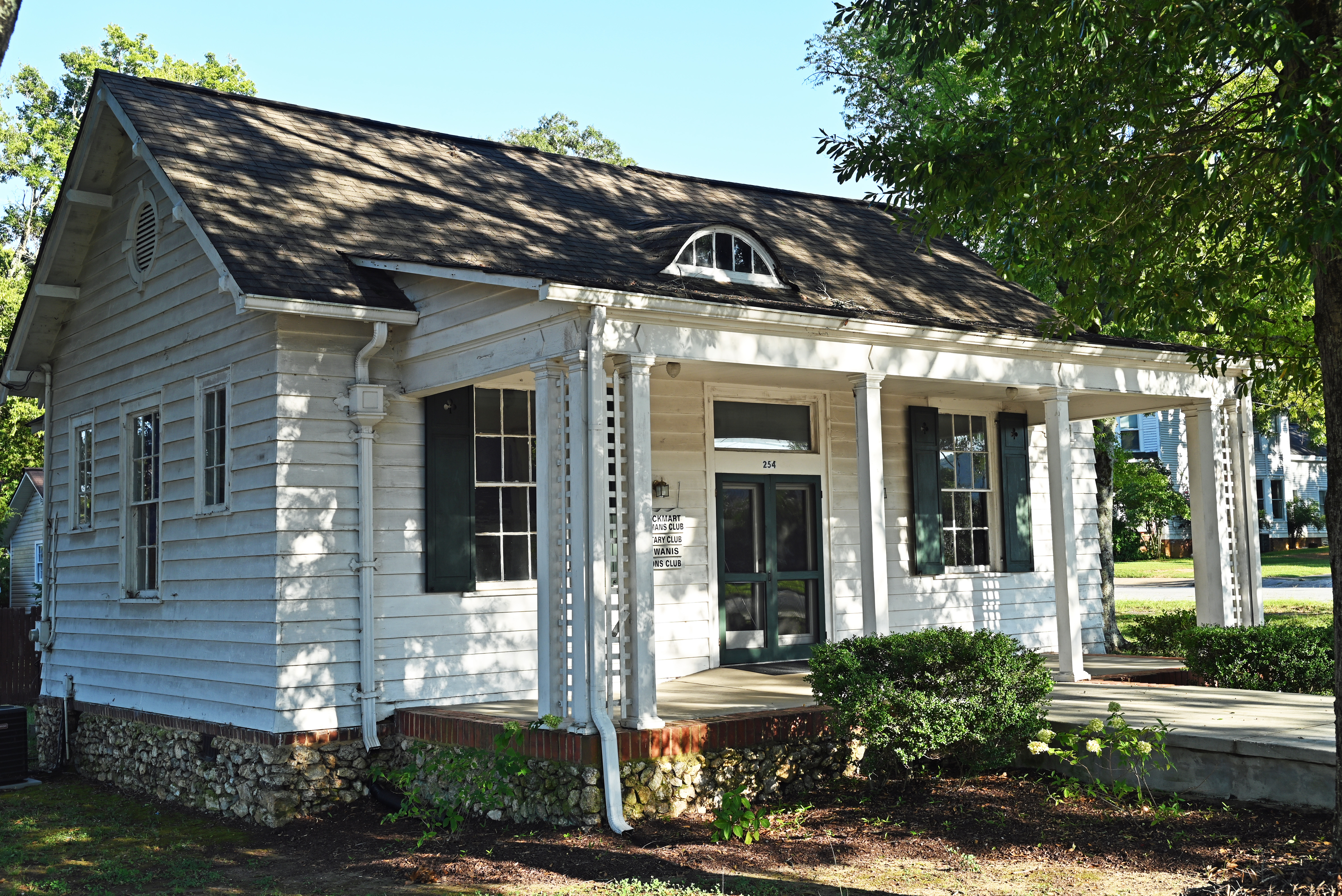

- Location within Georgia Location within the United States
- Location: 301 N. Marble St., between College and Ivy, Rockmart, Georgia
- Coordinates: 33.99933°N 85.04895°W
- Area: less than one acre
- Built: 1922
- Architect: Roy W. Reece
- Architectural style: Bungalow/American Craftsman
- NRHP reference No.: 95000738
- Added to NRHP: June 20, 1995

Rockmart Woman's Club is a historic building in Rockmart, Georgia. The club was organized in 1906 and became an affiliate of the Georgia Federation of Women's Clubs in 1913. In 1922, the club moved into the eponymous building designed by W. Roy Reece. It was added to the National Register of Historic Places in 1995. It is located on North Marble Street between College and Ivy and is part of the Cedartown Waterworks-Woman's Building-Big Spring Park Historic District.

== See also ==
- National Register of Historic Places listings in Polk County, Georgia
