= Albert Hawkes =

Albert Hawkes may refer to:

- Albert W. Hawkes (1878–1971), US Senator from New Jersey
- Albert King Hawkes (1848–1916), Atlanta, Georgia advocate for children's libraries and theaters
- Albert Hawkes (rugby league) (1887–1962), Australian rugby league footballer
