= Saratoga Victory Mill =

- U.S. National Register of Historic Places
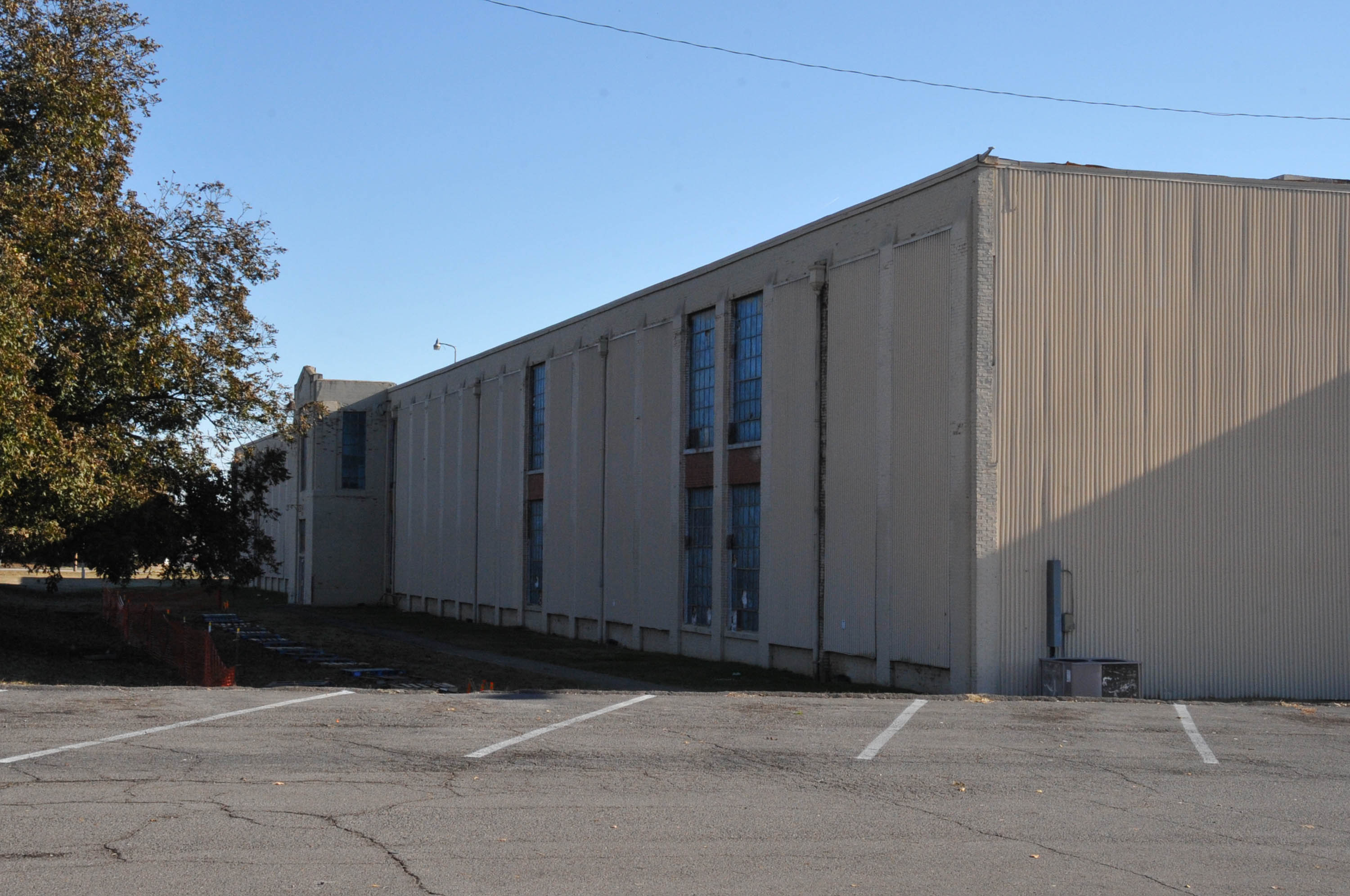
- The building in May 2008

- Location within Alabama Location within the United States
- Location: 1821 Gunter Ave., Guntersville, Alabama
- Coordinates: 34°20′23″N 86°18′33″W
- Area: 7.3 acres (3.0 ha)
- Built: 1928
- Architect: Robert & Co.
- NRHP reference No.: 84000659
- Added to NRHP: April 12, 1984

The Saratoga Victory Mill on Gunter Avenue in Guntersville, Alabama was built in 1928 when the company moved from Victory, Saratoga County, New York. It was a work of architectural and engineering firm Robert & Company. It has also been known as Guntersville Mill and as Standard-Coosa-Thatcher Mill. It was listed on the National Register of Historic Places in 1984.

== See also ==
- Victory Mills in Saratoga County, New York
