= Hawkes Children's Libraries =

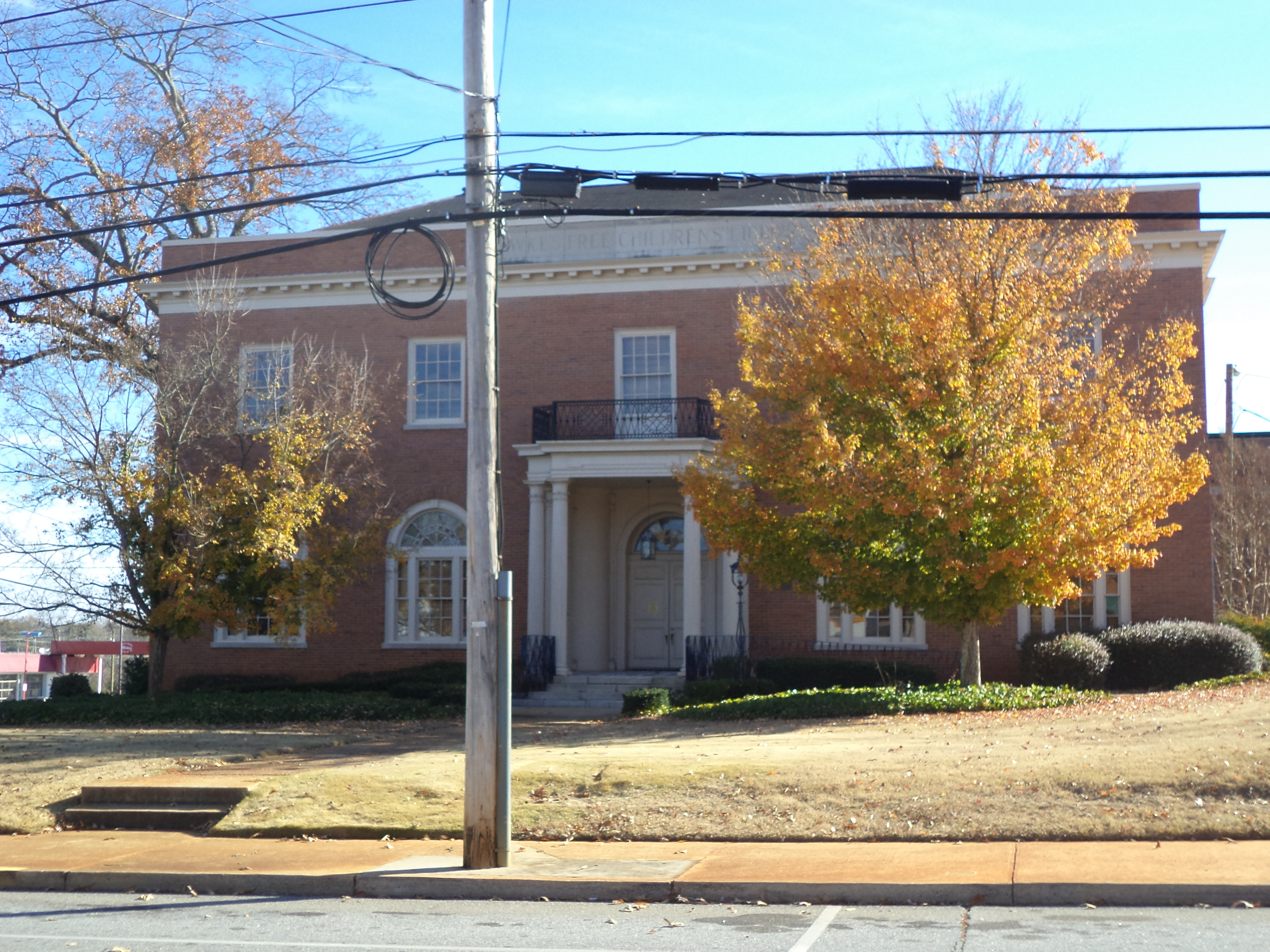
Hawkes Children's Library (Griffin, Georgia)

The Hawkes Children's Libraries were a series of libraries inspired by Albert King Hawkes (1848–1916) of Atlanta, Georgia who desired children's libraries and theaters in Georgia's towns.

At least three survive and are listed on the National Register of Historic Places (NRHP).

These include:

- Hawkes Children's Library (West Point, Georgia) (1922), NRHP-listed
- Hawkes Children's Library (Cedartown, Georgia) (1921), NRHP-listed
- Hawkes Children's Library (Griffin, Georgia) (1915–16), at 210 S. 6th St., NRHP-listed in Spalding County. Designed in 1915 by Atlanta architect Neel Reid.
- Hawkes Children's Library (Jackson, Georgia)
- Hawkes Children's Library (Roswell, Georgia)

Hawkes unfortunately died before much of his vision could be achieved.

== See also ==
- Lists of Carnegie libraries
- List of Rosenwald schools
