= L. W. Robert Jr. =

L. W. "Chip" Robert Jr.
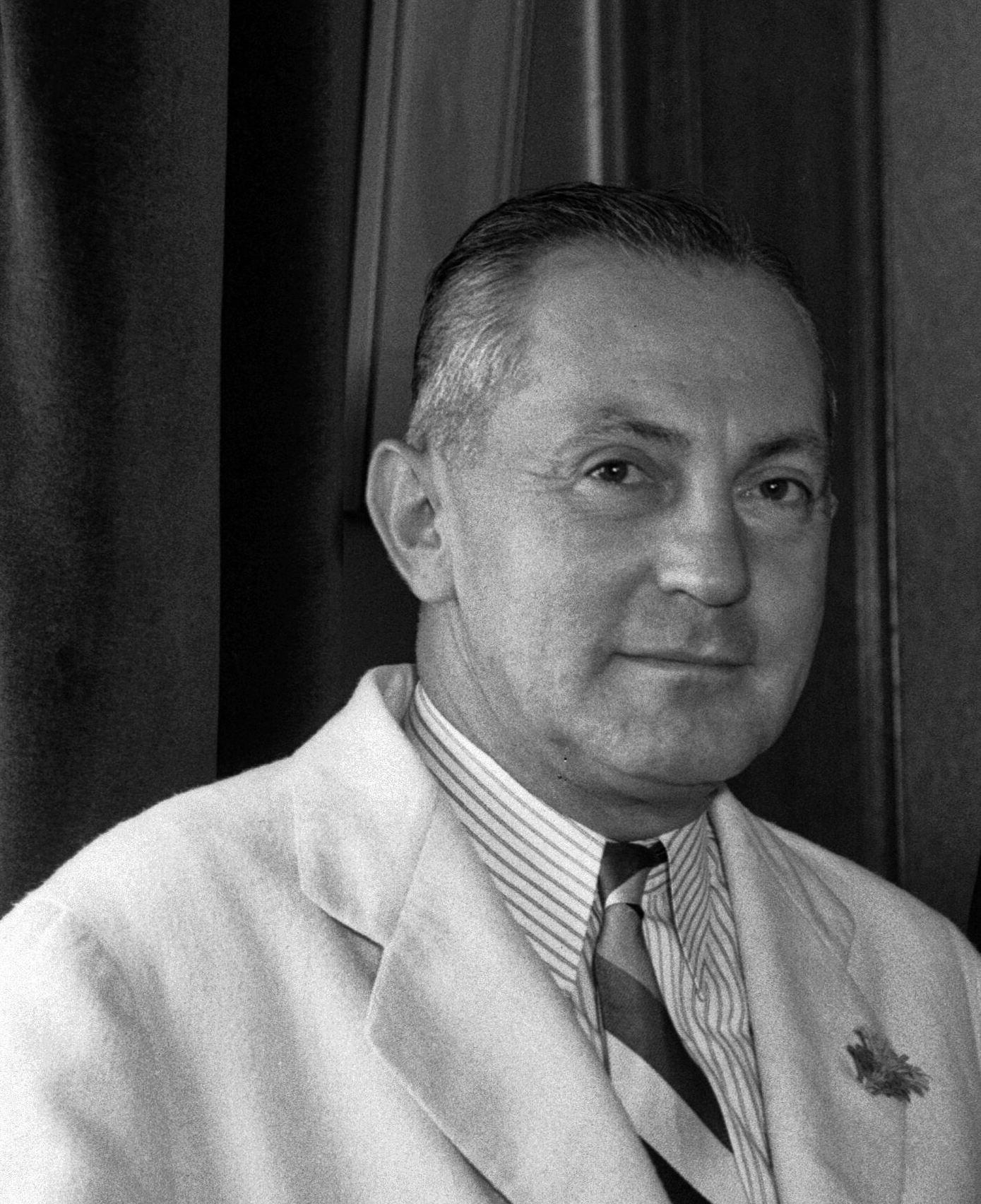
- Assistant Secretary of the Treasury L. W. Robert Jr. in 1933
- Born: 1889
- Died: 1976 (aged 86–87)
- Education: Georgia Institute of Technology
- Employer: Robert and Company
- Known for: Assistant Treasurer of the United States Secretary of the Democratic National Committee Regent on the Georgia Board of Regents

Lawrence Wood "Chip" Robert Jr. (1889–1976) was an American government official and engineer who founded the engineering and architectural firm Robert and Company. He served as Assistant Secretary of the Treasury in the early years of the New Deal.

== Early life and education ==
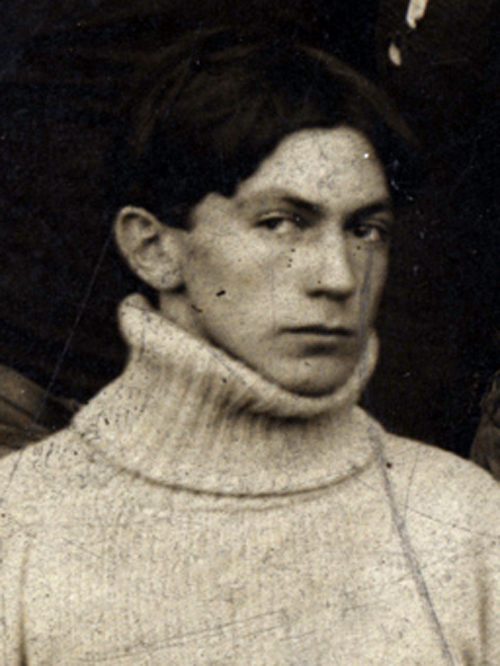
Robert at Georgia Tech (1904)

While at Georgia Institute of Technology, Robert was the captain of the cross country team in 1906 and the Georgia Tech football and baseball teams in 1908, and earned the maximum of 12 varsity letters. Robert attended Georgia Institute of Technology from the fall of 1903 and graduated with a degree in civil engineering in 1908 and in experimental engineering in 1909.

== Career ==
He founded Robert and Company, an architectural firm, in 1917. Robert was the president of the Atlanta Crackers, Atlanta's minor league baseball team.

Robert was appointed Assistant Secretary of the Treasury and served from 1933 to 1936; he supervised the Public Works of Art Project, the first arts project of the New Deal. He was then appointed secretary of the Democratic National Committee in 1936, and was the executive officer of the Conference of Southeastern Governors in November 1937.

Robert was appointed to the Georgia Board of Regents in 1937. He was a member during the Cocking affair and voted with the governor to remove Walter Cocking.

== Memberships and legacy ==
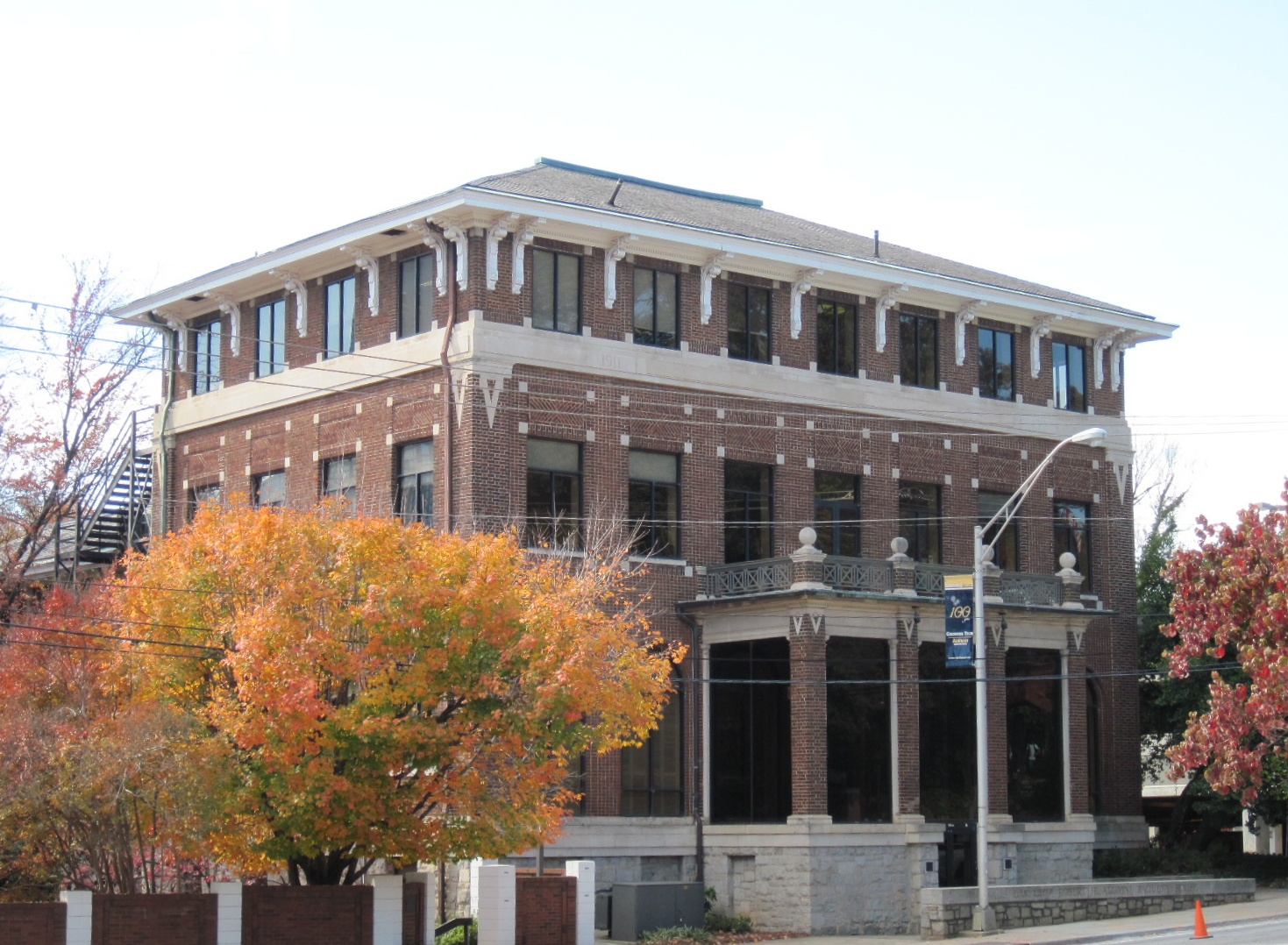
L. W. "Chip" Robert Jr. Alumni House

Robert was the first-ever recipient of Georgia Tech's Alumni Distinguished Service Award in 1934. He is the namesake for the "Alumni House", the building in which the Georgia Tech Alumni Association has been located since 1979. A scholarship fund was named in his honor in 1971 and designated for the National Merit Scholarship Program in 1979. He was inducted into the Georgia Sports Hall of Fame in 1989.

His daughter, Louisa Robert, was a member of the 1932 United States Olympic team.

== See also ==
- List of Georgia Tech Yellow Jackets starting quarterbacks
