= Cedartown Waterworks–Woman's Building–Big Spring Park Historic District =

Historic district in Georgia, United States

- U.S. National Register of Historic Places
- U.S. Historic district
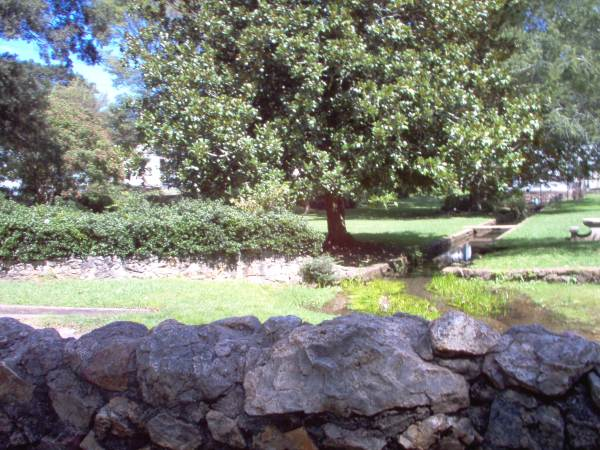
- Big Spring Park

- Location within Georgia
- Location: Jct. of Wissahickon Ave. and Bradford St., Cedartown, Georgia
- Coordinates: 34°0′52″N 85°15′31″W
- Area: 2.2 acres (0.89 ha)
- Built: 1892
- Built by: Poundstone, Odis Clay
- Architectural style: Romanesque, Colonial Revival
- NRHP reference No.: 00001475
- Added to NRHP: December 7, 2000

The Cedartown Waterworks–Woman's Building–Big Spring Park Historic District is a historic district listed on the National Register of Historic Places. It includes three properties in Polk County, Georgia, west of downtown Cedartown, Georgia: Big Spring Park, the Cedartown Waterworks, and the Cedartown Woman's Building.

The district was listed on the National Register of Historic Places in 2000.

== See also ==
- National Register of Historic Places listings in Polk County, Georgia
