= Victory Mills =

- U.S. National Register of Historic Places
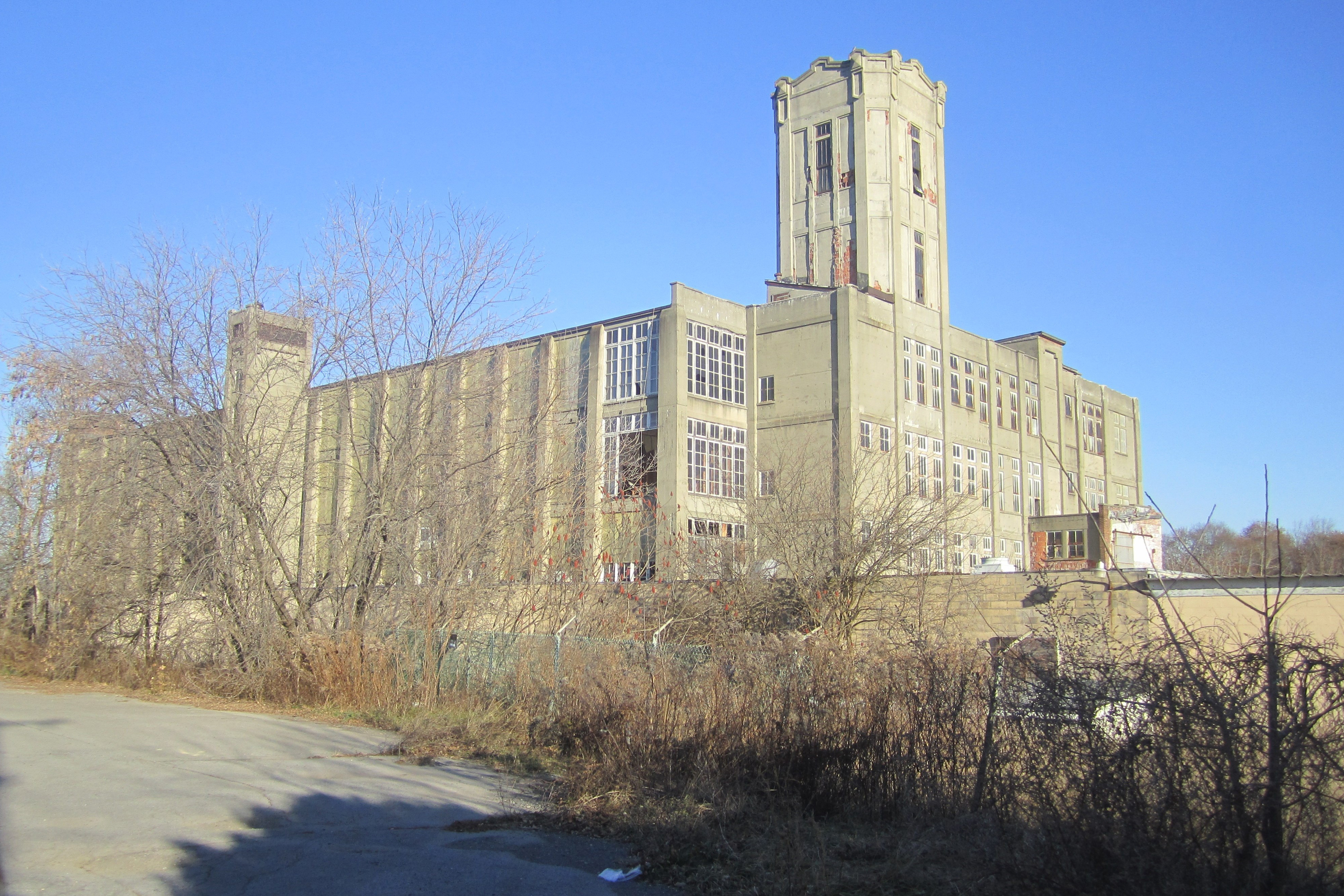

- Location within New York Location within the United States
- Location: 42 Gates Ave., Victory, New York
- Coordinates: 43°5′20.7″N 73°35′30.78″W
- Area: 6.6 acres (2.7 ha)
- Built: 1918
- Architect: Higginson, William
- NRHP reference No.: 09001271
- Added to NRHP: September 16, 2009

Victory Mills was a historic textile mill building located at Victory in Saratoga County, New York, and was built in 1918 by the American Manufacturing Company. It was a rectangular, five story brick and reinforced concrete building measuring 282 feet (86 m) by 157 feet (48 m), and had about 220,000 square feet (20,000 m^{2}) of space. It featured six tower structures, five for stairs and one holding a water tower, and also operated as a cotton mill until 1929, when operations moved to Guntersville, Alabama. In 1937, it was purchased by the United Board and Carton Corporation, later A.L. Garber / Wheelabrator-Frye, then Clevepak Corporation / Victory Specialty Packaging Company who manufactured folding cartons.

It was listed on the National Register of Historic Places in 2009. On Saturday, May 31, 2025, the mill structure was engulfed in a massive structure fire, and the building has been demolished as a result of the fires. More than a dozen fire departments from around Saratoga County and Washington County responded to the blaze, and were unsuccessful at saving the building. Two teens, including a 14-year-old, were arrested for setting fire to the building.

== See also ==
- Saratoga Victory Mill in Alabama
