= Cedartown Commercial Historic District =

Historic district in Georgia, United States

- U.S. National Register of Historic Places
- U.S. Historic district
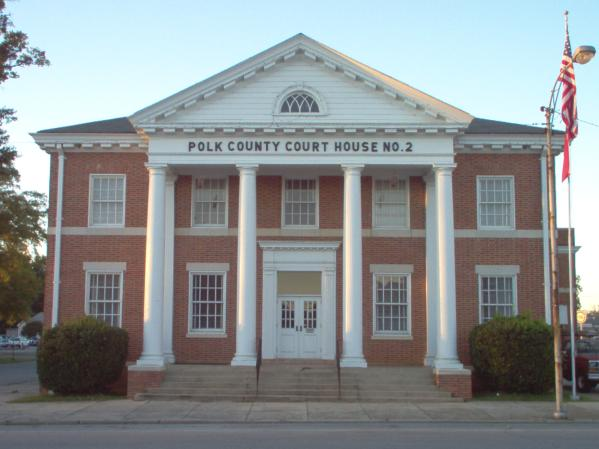

- Location within Georgia
- Location: Roughly bounded by East Ave. and S. Philpot, Gibson and College Sts., Cedartown, Georgia
- Coordinates: 34°0′40″N 85°15′20″W
- Area: 30 acres (12 ha)
- Built: 1914
- Architect: Oscar Wenderoth, Neel Reid and others
- Architectural style: Classical Revival, Italianate, Art Deco
- NRHP reference No.: 92001715
- Added to NRHP: December 24, 1992

The Cedartown Commercial Historic District is a historic district in Cedartown, Georgia. It is roughly bounded by East Avenue, South Philpot Street, Gibson Street, and College Street. It was listed on the National Register of Historic Places in 1992.

The district includes 65 contributing buildings, one other contributing structure, and a contributing object. The majority of buildings are one-story and two-story brick commercial buildings on South Main Street that were built from the 1870s to 1942.

== See also ==
- National Register of Historic Places listings in Polk County, Georgia
