= Hightower Falls =

American waterfall attraction

Coordinates: 33°56′03″N 85°08′39″W

Hightower Falls is a waterfall and historic site in Cedartown, Georgia.

== History ==
In 1843, Elias Dorsey Hightower, then 35 years old, built a cotton gin in the foothills of the Appalachian Mountains beside an 80-foot (24 m) waterfall. During this time cotton was becoming the mainstay of the south’s economy. Hightower then built a three-storey mill at the site, using it to grind wheat and corn for flour and cornmeal. The surrounding land was used to raise sheep by professional Welsh herders, who occupied the 2nd and 3rd floors of the mill.

Hightower feared for the safety of his mill and his home during the Civil War. Troops camped on the mill grounds by the Falls, but left no damage. Hightower then built a dam at the precipice to raise the waterfall several feet. Once this was done, he added a tannery and sorghum syrup mill, and raised honey bees.

In 1972, Hightower Falls opened to the public. Sightseers would often visit to picnic, tour the ruins of the beautiful grounds and sometimes find a romantic get-a-way spot. There were 120 campsites, 12 cabins, a camp store and a restaurant. All these amenities closed within a two-year period. Hightower Falls remains in ruins today from lack of use. The walls are the only remains of the old mill itself.

Since being purchased by its current owners in 1996, the present owner of the Falls realized the significance of its heritage and re-opened it for public use. Today, the Falls are available through private bookings only.

== Amenities ==
Facilities at the Falls, used for private parties and celebrations, include:

- Recreational space with picnic tables
- 12 cabins accommodating up to 46 people for overnight stays
- Walking trails and campsite areas

== See also ==
- List of waterfalls
