= Hawkes Children's Library (Cedartown, Georgia) =

Historic library building in Cedartown, Georgia, US

- U.S. National Register of Historic Places
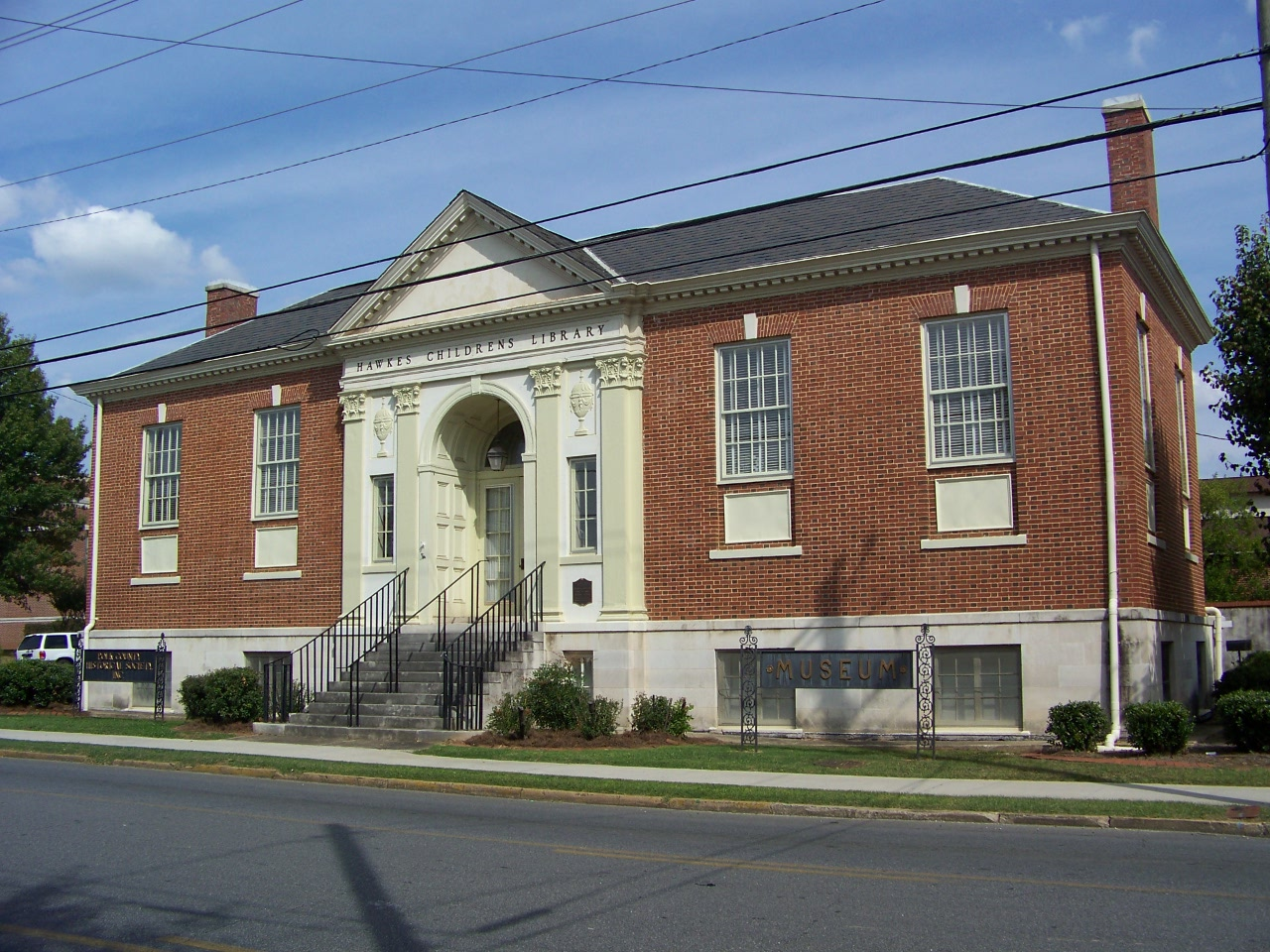

- Location within Georgia Location within the United States
- Location: S.College St., Cedartown, Georgia
- Coordinates: 34°0′47″N 85°15′23″W
- Area: less than one acre
- Built: 1921
- Architect: Hentz, Reid & Adler
- Architectural style: Georgian Revival
- NRHP reference No.: 80001223
- Added to NRHP: November 24, 1980

Hawkes Children's Library is a historic library building in Cedartown, Georgia. Albert King Hawkes was a children's library and theater advocate from Atlanta who desired the libraries in Georgia's towns. This Hawkes Children's Library was designed by Neel Reid and built in 1921. It is now a museum operated by the Polk County Historical Society. It was listed on the National Register of Historic Places on November 24, 1980. It is located on South College Street.

== See also ==
- National Register of Historic Places listings in Polk County, Georgia
- Hawkes Children's Library (West Point, Georgia)
