= Robert and Company =

Architectural firm based in Georgia, USA

Robert and Company is an architectural engineering firm based in Atlanta, Georgia with multiple offices in the southern United States. It was founded in 1917. Its founder was L.W. "Chip" Robert Jr.

The firm provides multiple services including commercial and military aviation services, architecture, planning, landscape architecture and even providing historic preservation services.

A number of its works are listed on the U.S. National Register of Historic Places.

Works include:

- Atlanta Civic Center, 1968
- Bell Bomber Plant, now Lockheed Georgia at Dobbins Air Reserve Base, Marietta, Georgia
- Coca-Cola Baltimore Branch Factory, 1215 E. Fort Ave. Baltimore, MD (Robert & Co.), NRHP-listed
- Grady Memorial Hospital, Atlanta, 1958
- Hawkes Children's Library of West Point, 100 W. 8th St. West Point, GA (Robert & Co.), NRHP-listed
- NAS Chase Field-Building 1001, Independence St., 0.45 mi. S of jct. with TX 202 Beeville, TX (Robert & Company), NRHP-listed
- NAS Chase Field-Building 1009, Essex St. 0.68 mi. SSE of the jct. of TX 202 and Independence St. Beeville, TX (Robert & Company), NRHP-listed
- NAS Chase Field-Building 1015, Byrd St. 0.82 mi. SSE of jct. of TX 202 and Independence St. Beeville, TX (Robert & Company), NRHP-listed
- NAS Chase Field-Building 1040, Enterprise St. 0.37 mi. SSE of the jct. of TX 202 and Independence St. Beeville, TX (Robert & Company), NRHP-listed
- NAS Chase Field-Building 1042, Ofstie Rd. 0.6 mi. SSE of the jct. of TX 202 and Independence St. Beeville, TX (Robert & Company), NRHP-listed
- NAS Chase Field-Quarters R, Essex St. 0.43 mi. SSW of the jct. of TX 202 and Independence St. Beeville, TX (Robert & Company), NRHP-listed
- NAS Chase Field-Quarters S, Essex St. 0.45 mi. SSW of the jct. of TX 202 and Independence St. Beeville, TX (Robert & Company), NRHP-listed
- Saratoga Victory Mill, 1821 Gunter Ave. Guntersville, AL (Robert & Co.), NRHP-listed
