= Cedartown, Georgia =

- City
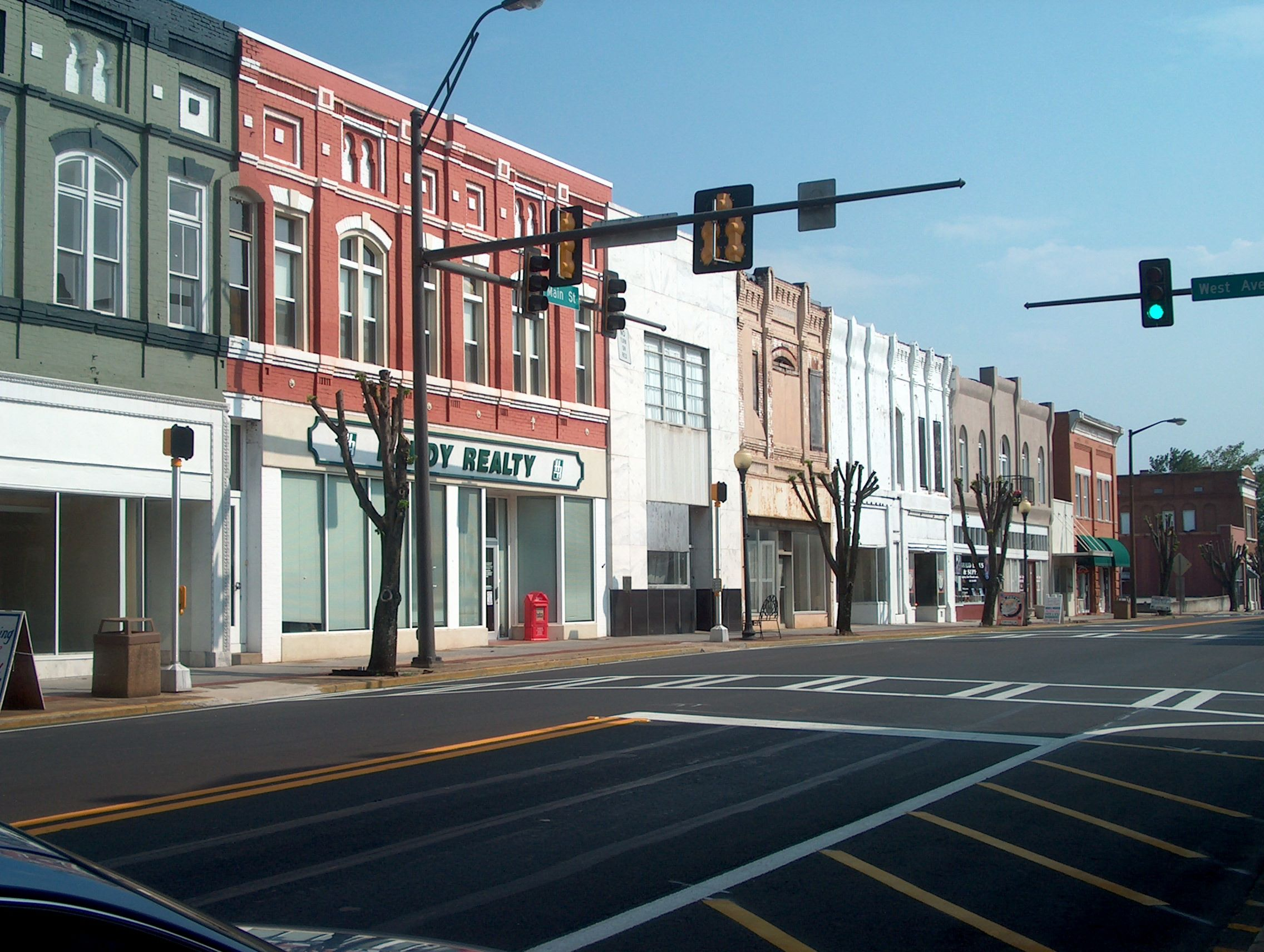
- Cedartown Commercial Historic District in 2007

- Location in Polk County, Georgia
- Coordinates: 34°0′55″N 85°15′14″W
- Country: United States
- State: Georgia
- County: Polk

Government
  - Type: City Commission

Area
  - Total: 9.16 sq mi (23.72 km^{2})
  - Land: 9.13 sq mi (23.65 km^{2})
  - Water: 0.031 sq mi (0.08 km^{2})
- Elevation: 840 ft (260 m)

Population (2020)
  - Total: 10,190
  - Density: 1,116.2/sq mi (430.96/km^{2})
- Time zone: UTC-5 (Eastern (EST))
  - Summer (DST): UTC-4 (EDT)
- ZIP code: 30125
- Area codes: 770/678/470/943
- FIPS code: 13-14500
- GNIS feature ID: 0312503
- Website: Cedartown, Georgia

Cedartown is a city and the county seat of Polk County, Georgia, United States. The population was 10,190 at the 2020 census. It is located northwest of Atlanta near the Alabama-Georgia state line.

The Cedartown Commercial Historic District is listed on the National Register of Historic Places. The Cedartown Waterworks-Woman's Building-Big Spring Park Historic District is also listed along with the Northwest Cedartown Historic District and South Philpot Street Historic District.

== History ==
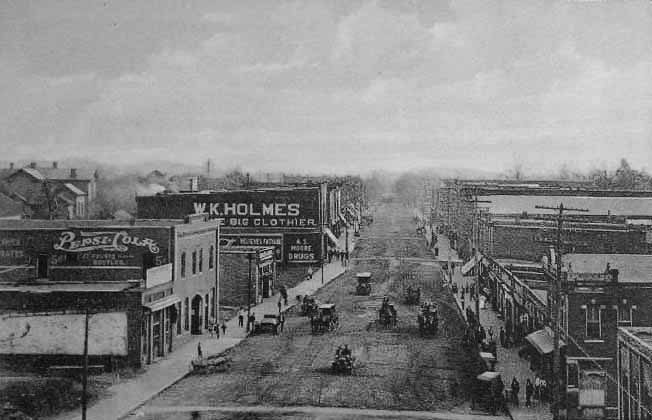
Cedartown (1905)

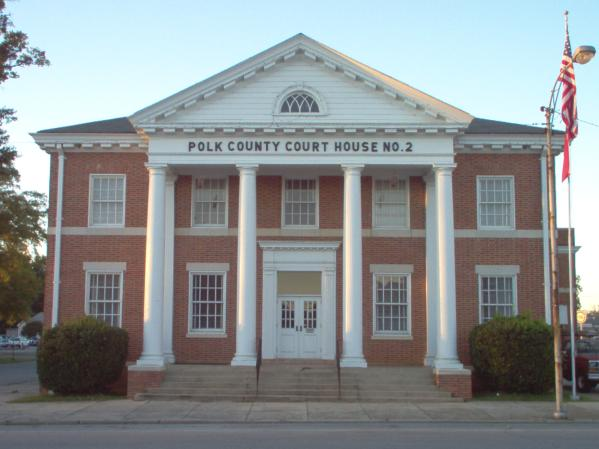
Cedartown has been the county seat of Polk County since 1851, when the county was created.

Cherokee and Creek Native Americans first inhabited the area known as Cedar Valley. The Cherokee people had established a village there in the 1830s after the Native Americans were forced out on the Trail of Tears. The settlement was named for the red cedar timber near the site.

The most famous of these settlers was Asa Prior. According to local legend, the water rights to Big Spring were won for the white settlers by a local white boy in a footrace with a Cherokee youth. Some versions of the legend differ, saying that the rights to the spring were won by the Cherokee people from the Creek people in a ball game. "Big Strickland" became "Cedar Town" when Prior deeded ten acres of adjacent land to the newly chartered city in 1852. Van Wert (a mile from present day Rockmart) was the original county seat and Cedar Town became the county seat later.

During the Civil War, Cedar Town was abandoned by most of its citizens when Union troops encroached. The city was burnt to the ground by the Union forces of General Hugh Judson Kilpatrick in 1865, leaving only one mill standing on the outskirts of town.

In 1867, the town was re-chartered by the state of Georgia as Cedartown. An influx of industrial business bolstered its largely cotton-based economy, with Goodyear and other fabric mills and iron works appearing in or near what is now the Cedartown Industrial Park on the west side of town.

Industrial and passenger railroad service was added to Cedartown in the early 20th century. Main St. became a part of U.S. Route 27, a major north–south automobile route that connects Cedartown to larger cities like Chattanooga, Tennessee and Columbus, Georgia. U.S. 27 also intersects in town with U.S. Route 278, which connects Cedartown with Atlanta.

The Goodyear Tire and Rubber Company built a large textile mill operation in Cedartown, and also built a large residential section of town for mill workers, now known as the Goodyear Village.

In recent times, the Georgia Rails to Trails project has converted much of the former Seaboard Air Line into the Silver Comet Trail, a federal and state funded park that connects many cities in northwest Georgia. The former Seaboard Air Line, now CSXT, tracks are still in place and used between Rockmart and Cedartown, to serve rail customers in both cities, connecting with the former L&N line in Cartersville, Ga on a former SAL branchline, that now serves a Georgia Power plant with Wyoming coal.

Cedartown's Main Street is listed in the National Register of Historic Places in recognition of its 1890s architecture. During the 1970s, many structures were demolished, including train stations, churches, and a high school, and a theater on Main Street.

In January 2017, the Polk County Comprehensive Plan outlined investments to be made in the repair and construction of new sidewalks, street parks, and paving in Cedartown over the next decade.

== Geography ==
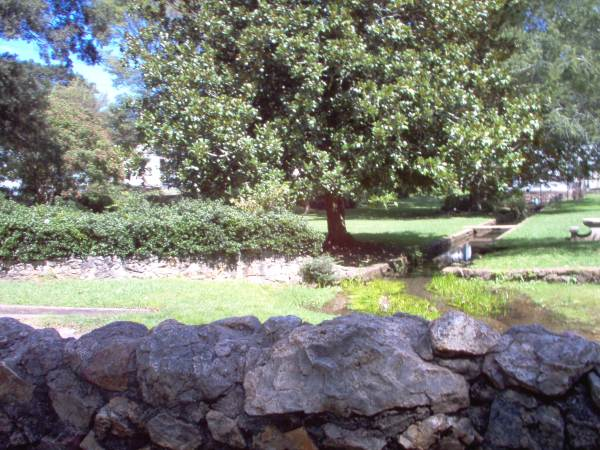
Cedartown's historic Big Spring provides water to 10,000 people.

According to the U.S. Census Bureau, Cedartown has a total area of 6.9 square miles (18 km^{2}), of which 6.8 square miles (18 km^{2}) is land and 0.04 square miles (0.10 km^{2}) (0.44%) is water.

Many major highways pass through the city, namely U.S. Routes 27 and 278, as well as Georgia State Route 100. U.S. 27 runs from south to north to the east of the city, leading north 19 mi (31 km) to Rome and south 17 mi (27 km) to Buchanan. U.S. 278 runs through the main part of town from west to east, leading east 14 mi (23 km) to Rockmart and southwest 25 mi (40 km) to Piedmont, Alabama. GA-100 runs from south to north through the center of town as well, leading northwest 12 mi (19 km) to Cave Spring and south 21 mi (34 km) to Tallapoosa.

=== Climate ===
Cedartown has a humid subtropical climate (Köppen climate classification Cfa), with mild winters and hot, humid summers.

Climate data for Cedartown, Georgia (1991-2020 normals, extremes 1896–present)
Month	Jan	Feb	Mar	Apr	May	Jun	Jul	Aug	Sep	Oct	Nov	Dec	Year
Record high °F (°C)	80 (27)	83 (28)	89 (32)	94 (34)	99 (37)	102 (39)	104 (40)	105 (41)	102 (39)	98 (37)	87 (31)	80 (27)	105 (41)
Mean daily maximum °F (°C)	53.3 (11.8)	57.5 (14.2)	66.0 (18.9)	74.8 (23.8)	81.5 (27.5)	88.1 (31.2)	91.0 (32.8)	90.5 (32.5)	85.3 (29.6)	75.3 (24.1)	63.8 (17.7)	55.7 (13.2)	73.6 (23.1)
Mean daily minimum °F (°C)	32.3 (0.2)	35.2 (1.8)	41.5 (5.3)	49.4 (9.7)	57.9 (14.4)	66.7 (19.3)	70.1 (21.2)	69.4 (20.8)	62.6 (17.0)	50.3 (10.2)	39.3 (4.1)	35.0 (1.7)	50.8 (10.5)
Record low °F (°C)	−9 (−23)	−10 (−23)	5 (−15)	23 (−5)	33 (1)	39 (4)	51 (11)	48 (9)	30 (−1)	18 (−8)	3 (−16)	−1 (−18)	−10 (−23)
Average rainfall inches (mm)	4.90 (124)	5.10 (130)	5.27 (134)	4.43 (113)	4.02 (102)	3.91 (99)	4.93 (125)	3.55 (90)	3.73 (95)	3.64 (92)	4.40 (112)	4.95 (126)	52.83 (1,342)
Source: NOAA

== Demographics ==
Historical population
Census	Pop.	Note	%±
1870	323		—
1880	843		161.0%
1890	1,625		92.8%
1900	2,823		73.7%
1910	3,551		25.8%
1920	4,053		14.1%
1930	8,124		100.4%
1940	9,025		11.1%
1950	9,470		4.9%
1960	9,340		−1.4%
1970	9,253		−0.9%
1980	8,619		−6.9%
1990	7,978		−7.4%
2000	9,470		18.7%
2010	9,750		3.0%
2020	10,190		4.5%
U.S. Decennial Census

Cedartown is the principal city of the Cedartown micropolitan area, which is included in the Atlanta–Athens-Clarke–Sandy Springs combined statistical area.

=== 2020 census ===
As of the 2020 census, there were 10,190 people, 3,649 households, and 1,915 families residing in the city. The median age was 33.6 years. 29.7% of residents were under the age of 18 and 14.9% of residents were 65 years of age or older. For every 100 females, there were 90.8 males, and for every 100 females age 18 and over there were 87.8 males age 18 and over.

98.6% of residents lived in urban areas, while 1.4% lived in rural areas.

Of the 3,649 households in Cedartown, 36.3% had children under the age of 18 living in them. Of all households, 32.9% were married-couple households, 20.7% were households with a male householder and no spouse or partner present, and 39.0% were households with a female householder and no spouse or partner present. About 32.7% of all households were made up of individuals, and 15.2% had someone living alone who was 65 years of age or older.

There were 4,048 housing units, of which 9.9% were vacant. The homeowner vacancy rate was 2.1% and the rental vacancy rate was 6.8%.

Cedartown racial composition
Race	Num.	Perc.
White (non-Hispanic)	4,557	44.72%
Black or African American (non-Hispanic)	1,788	17.55%
Native American	32	0.31%
Asian	55	0.54%
Pacific Islander	5	0.05%
Other/Mixed	319	3.13%
Hispanic or Latino	3,434	33.7%

=== 2000 census ===
As of the census of 2000, there were 9,470 people, 3,370 households, and 2,237 families residing in the city. The population density was 1,384.0 inhabitants per square mile (534.4/km^{2}). There were 3,642 housing units at an average density of 532.2 per square mile (205.5/km^{2}). The racial makeup of the city was 63.37% White, 20.20% African American, 0.21% Native American, 0.37% Asian, 0.12% Pacific Islander, 14.13% from other races, and 1.61% from two or more races. Hispanic or Latino of any race were 22.62% of the population.

There were 3,370 households, out of which 29.4% had children under the age of 18 living with them, 43.1% were married couples living together, 17.6% had a female householder with no husband present, and 33.6% were non-families. 29.5% of all households were made up of individuals, and 15.2% had someone living alone who was 65 years of age or older. The average household size was 2.65 and the average family size was 3.18.

In the city, the population was spread out, with 25.1% under the age of 18, 13.2% from 18 to 24, 27.1% from 25 to 44, 18.2% from 45 to 64, and 16.5% who were 65 years of age or older. The median age was 32 years. For every 100 females, there were 102.9 males. For every 100 females age 18 and over, there were 99.9 males.

The median income for a household in the city was $24,562, and the median income for a family was $28,119. Males had a median income of $25,295 versus $20,711 for females. The per capita income for the city was $12,251. About 20.3% of families and 24.3% of the population were below the poverty line, including 28.7% of those under age 18 and 15.3% of those age 65 or over.

== Economy ==
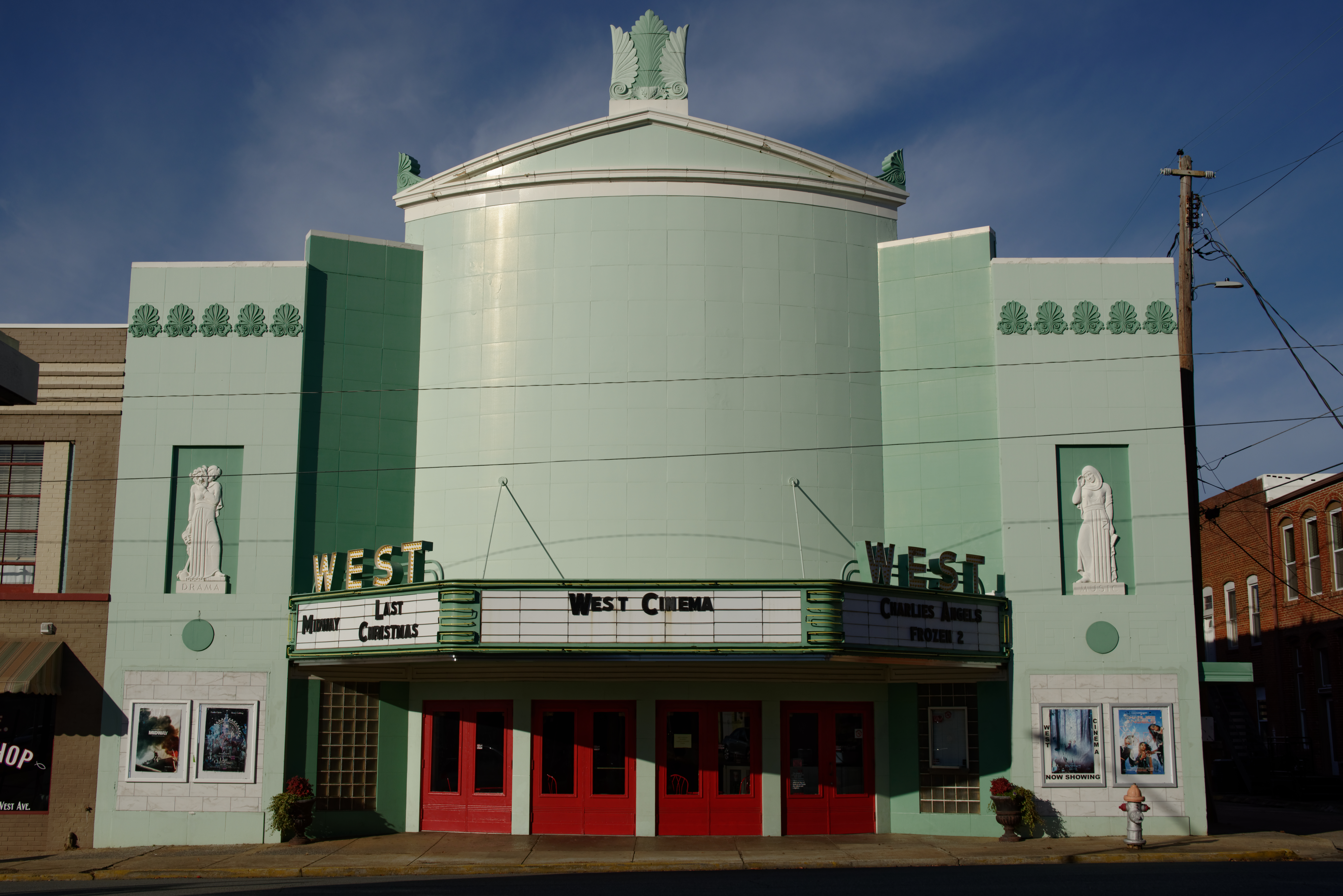
West Cinema

With the shift away from rural living patterns and toward interstate highway satellite suburban living patterns, combined with the general U.S. shift away from agricultural and industrial economies, Cedartown is left in an awkward position. The city suffered a major economic blow when the Goodyear Tire and Rubber Company closed its local factory operations. For its employment, Cedartown mainly relies on the prospect of large corporate operation centers such as Cingular Wireless, manufacturing operations like that of The HON Company, and the retail operations of Wal-Mart.

The Hon Company is Cedartown's largest for-profit employer with over 800 employees. With a recently announced expansion, this number will grow in the near future. Cedartown is also home to an AT&T (formerly Cingular) technical support facility for the company's wireless customers.

The Rome Plow Company, formerly located in Rome, Georgia, is headquartered in Cedartown. It manufactured the Rome plows used as jungle-clearing vehicles during the Vietnam War and produced agricultural vehicles until it shut down in late 2009. Rome Plow has since been purchased and re-opened. The new facility recently underwent an expansion.

== Arts and culture ==
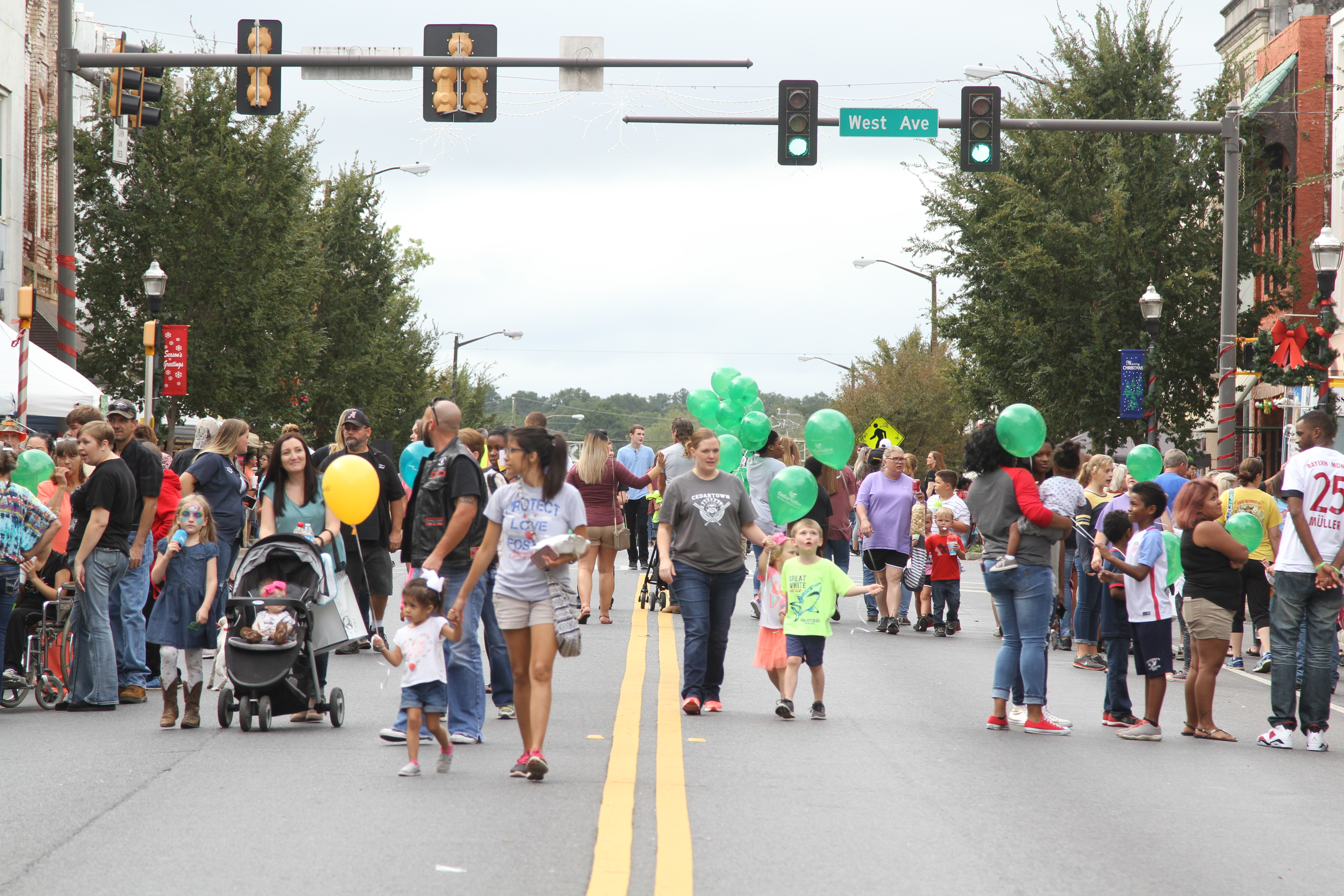
Participants in the downtown Fall Festival

- Cedartown Performing Arts Center
- Cedartown Museum of Coca-Cola Memorabilia
- Doug Sanders Golf Museum

Sites on the National Register of Historic Places:

- Cedartown Commercial Historic District
- Cedartown Waterworks-Women's Building-Big Spring Park Historic District
- Hawkes Children's Library
- Northwest Cedartown Historic District

== Parks and recreation ==
- The Silver Comet Trail is located 13 miles northwest of Atlanta, Georgia. It's free of charge, and travels west through Cobb, Paulding, and Polk counties. The non-motorized, paved trail is intended for walkers, hikers, bicyclists, rollerbladers, horses, dog walkers, and is wheelchair accessible. The trail is 61.5 miles long, and starts at the Mavell Road Trailhead in Smyrna, Georgia. It ends at the Georgia/Alabama state line, near Cedartown and The Esom Hill Trailhead.
- Peeks Park: a city park located in Cedartown, Georgia. It has a variety of outdoor recreational equipment, picnic tables, tennis courts, a water feature, paved walking paths, trees and is "child and pet friendly".
- Hightower Falls: in 1972 opened for sightseers with history dating to the 1800s and Elias Dorsey Hightower

== Education ==
The Polk County School District holds pre-school to grade twelve, and consists of six elementary schools, two middle schools, and two high schools. The district has 449 full-time teachers and over 7,017 students.

== Transportation ==
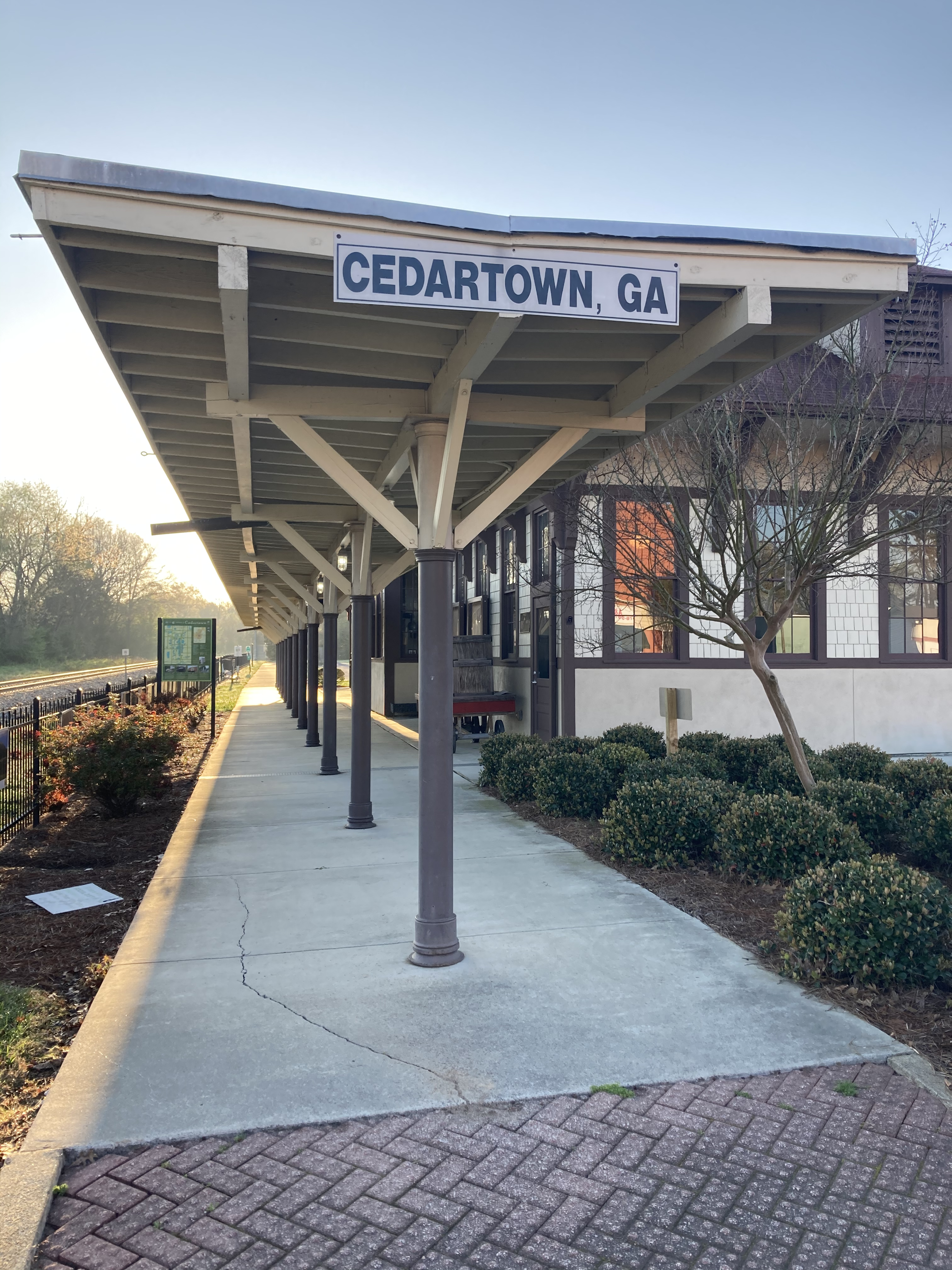
Cedartown depot replica

Access to nearby major cities such as Atlanta, Birmingham, and Chattanooga is easier with the expansion of U.S. Highway 27, which is four lanes from I-20 into Cedartown. The four lane expansion will soon have U.S. 27 four-laned all the way north to the Tennessee state line.

Passenger rail service to Cedartown ended in the 1969, with the discontinuance of the "Silver Comet" and SCL local trains #6 and #9, leading to the destruction of the historic Cedartown Depot train station. The city built a replica of the historic depot which now serves as the Welcome Center and the trailhead to the Silver Comet Trail. Rails of CSXT still are used in Cedartown and pass next to the new depot to this day.

The city does offer bus service and has frequent routes to neighboring Rockmart. The nearest stop on the Greyhound line is a full service station in Rome, Georgia, 20 miles north.

The nearest major airport is Hartsfield-Jackson Atlanta International Airport in Atlanta, 70 miles southeast; several local shuttle services are available.

== Media ==
=== Movie production ===
- Jayne Mansfield's Car (2012) is a drama movie featuring locations in Cedartown as a fictional city in Alabama. Visible is the historic downtown.

Controversy

Trenton Garner a Cedartown police officer firing a single shot that killed a one‑year‑old bottle‑raised donkey named HeeHaw during a search for a missing child.

== Notable people ==
- Ray Beck, All-American football player at Georgia Tech and professional football player
- Edgar Chandler, two-time All-American football player at the University of Georgia and professional player for the Buffalo Bills and New England Patriots
- Nick Chubb, University of Georgia football alumni and professional football player for the Cleveland Browns and the Houston Texans.
- Ida Cox (born Ida M. Prather, February 26, 1888, or 1896 – November 10, 1967) was an American singer and vaudeville performer, best known for her blues performances and recordings. She was billed as "The Uncrowned Queen of the Blues" lived in Cedartown as a child.
- Betty Reynolds Cobb, an author and activist, was a native of Cedartown and the first woman in Georgia to be admitted to the state bar.
- Phil Douglas, was a Major League Baseball player best remember for his time with the World Series Champion New York Giants.
- Korbin Forrister, NASCAR driver
- Ethel Harpst, founder of the Harpst House
- Agnes Ellen Harris, educator
- Seale Harris, physician and researcher, best known for his 1924 hypothesis of hyperinsulinism as a cause of spontaneous hypoglycemia
- Sterling Holloway was a stage and screen actor with over 100 movies and television shows to his credit. He was well known for his distinctive tenor voice, and is best remembered as the voice of Walt Disney's Winnie the Pooh. Holloway was born and raised in Cedartown.
- Jan Hooks, actress, comedian and long-time Saturday Night Live cast member who died on October 9, 2014, is buried in Northview Cemetery in Cedartown. Cedartown was the place she spent many summers with family as a child.
- Sam Hunt (born 1984), American singer and songwriter.
- Lulu Hurst, (1869–1950) also known as the "Georgia Wonder", was an American stage magician born in Cedartown/Polk County. Remembered for her demonstrations of seemingly miraculous physical strength, she later revealed that her feats had nothing to do with strength but were stage tricks accomplished by force deflection.
- Doug Sanders, winner of 20 tournaments on the PGA Tour.

== In popular culture ==
Country music artist Waylon Jennings had a minor hit single with the murder ballad "Cedartown, Georgia" from the 1971 album of the same name. The slow, meditative song about betrayal and murder was a portent of the outlaw country genre's predilection for themes that stood outside of what was acceptable in the Nashville music establishment:

Tonight I'll put her on a train for Georgia.
Gonna be a lot of kin folks squallin' and a-grievin',
'Cause that Cedartown gal ain't breathin'.

== See also ==
- Big Spring Park, Cedartown, Georgia
