= Frank H. Warder =

American state official (died 1955)

Frank H. Warder (died 1955) was the New York State superintendent of banks. Prior to that, Warder was secretary of the New York Bryan League. He was convicted of taking a bribe and spent 3 and half years in prison Sing Sing.

== Arrest, Conviction and Death ==
Warder was arrested in 1929 on bribery charges after a 38-year career. Future president, and the governor of New York State at the time, Franklin Roosevelt appointed Broderick as successor to Warder. Warder's wife suddenly died of heart attack on the day of her scheduled court appearance as a witness; the strain of bad publicity was cited as the cause. Warder was found guilty on November 6, 1929. Warder died on March 2, 1955.
