= Hawkes Children's Library of West Point =

- U.S. National Register of Historic Places
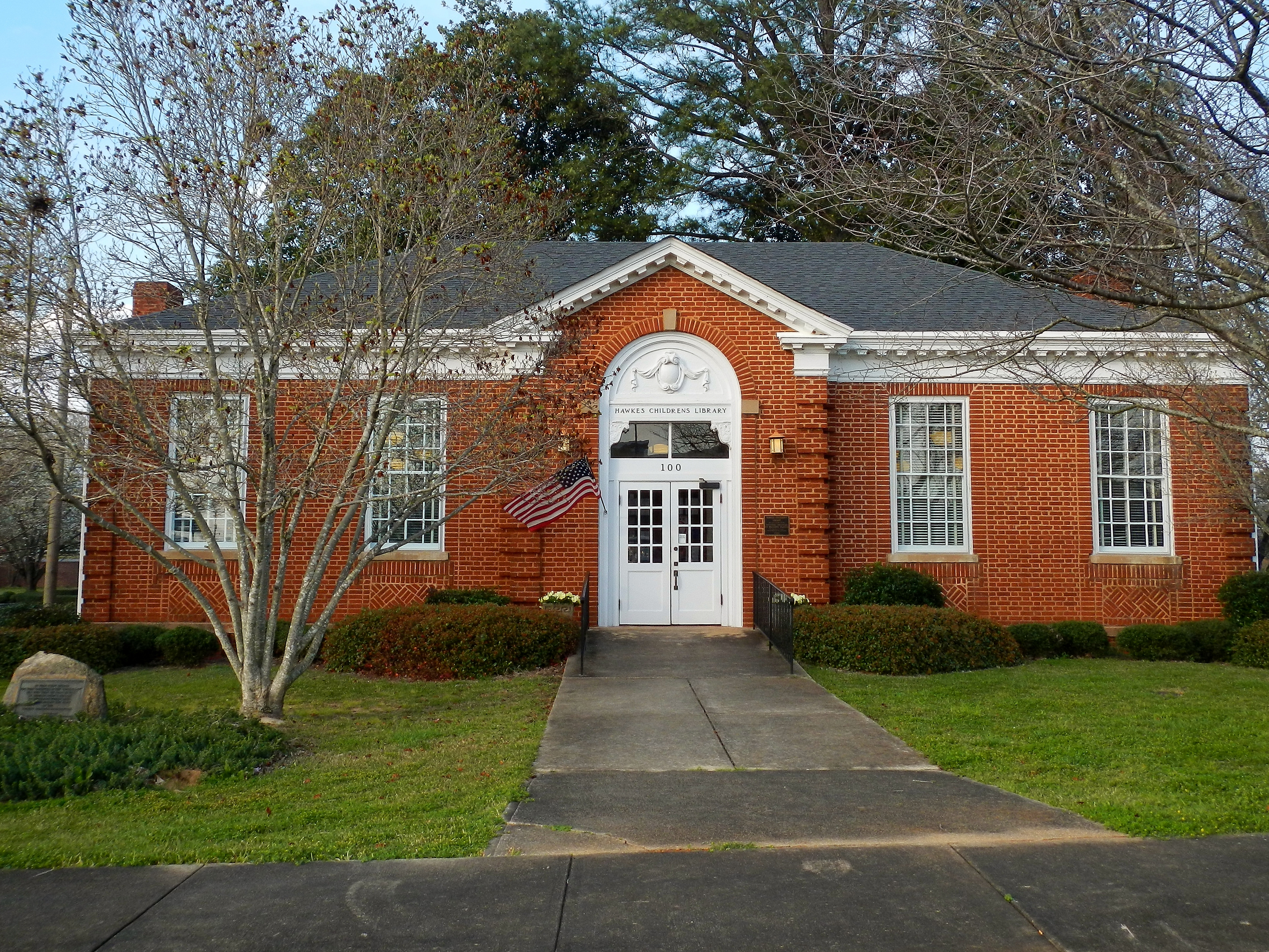

- Location within Georgia Location within the United States
- Location: 100 W. 8th St., West Point, Georgia
- Coordinates: 32°52′35″N 85°10′54″W
- Area: less than one acre
- Built: 1922
- Built by: Batson & Cook
- Architect: Robert & Co.
- Architectural style: Colonial Revival, Georgian Revival
- NRHP reference No.: 90001990
- Added to NRHP: December 28, 1990

The Hawkes Children's Library in West Point, Georgia was built in 1922. It is one of the Hawkes Children's Library buildings inspired and funded with support from Albert King Hawkes, who funded six children's libraries in rural towns throughout Georgia. The building is a work of architectural and engineering firm Robert & Co. and was constructed by Batson & Cook. It includes Colonial Revival and Georgian Revival architecture. The library was listed on the National Register of Historic Places in 1990.

The library is located along the Chattahoochee River in West Point. It contains historical information for Troup County, Georgia and Chambers County, Alabama. The library also hosts educational and arts programs.

== See also ==
- National Register of Historic Places listings in Troup County, Georgia
