= Grace Zia Chu =

Chinese cookbook author (1899–1999)

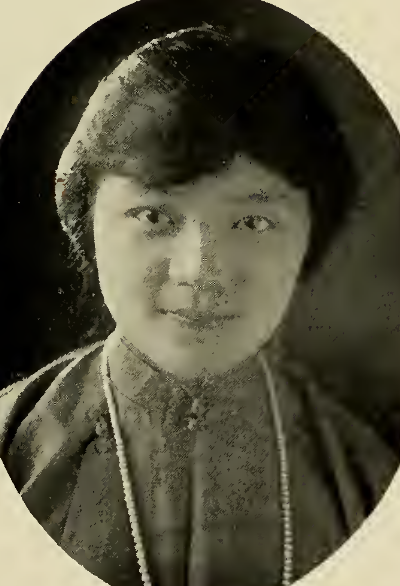
- Grace Zia, from the 1924 Wellesley College yearbook
- Born: August 23, 1899; Shanghai, China
- Died: April 15, 1999 (aged 99); Columbus, Ohio, US
- Occupations: Cookbook author, cooking teacher

Grace Zia Chu (August 23, 1899 – April 15, 1999) was an author of Chinese cookbooks and a major figure in American Chinese culinary world. Chu introduced generations of Americans to Chinese cooking.

== Personal life ==
Grace Zia Chu was born in Shanghai on 23 August 1899. Her parents were Zia Hong-lai and Sochen Sze. Grace Anna Zia attended the McTyeire School and later Wellesley College in the United States. Upon graduation in 1924, Zia returned to teach physical education in China at McTyeire and Ginling College.

In 1928 Zia married Chu Shih-ming, who was appointed military attache to the Chinese Embassy in Washington, D.C. in 1941, representing the Nationalist government. She returned to China after World War II, only to resettle in the United States by 1950. Five years later, Zia naturalized as an American citizen, and moved to New York City, where she taught cooking at her home, the China Institute, and the Mandarin House restaurant. Zia moved to Columbus, Ohio in the mid 1980s. Zia died at the age of 99 in Columbus on April 15, 1999.

== Notable works ==
The New York Times called her 1962 cookbook The Pleasures of Chinese Cooking. Chu authored Madame Chu's Chinese Cooking School in 1975, a detailed cookbook for the beginner to advanced cook.

== Awards and honours ==
Grace Zia Chu was named Grande Dame of Les Dames d'Escoffier, New York Chapter in 1984.

== See also ==
- Chinese Americans in New York City
