= Albert King Hawkes =

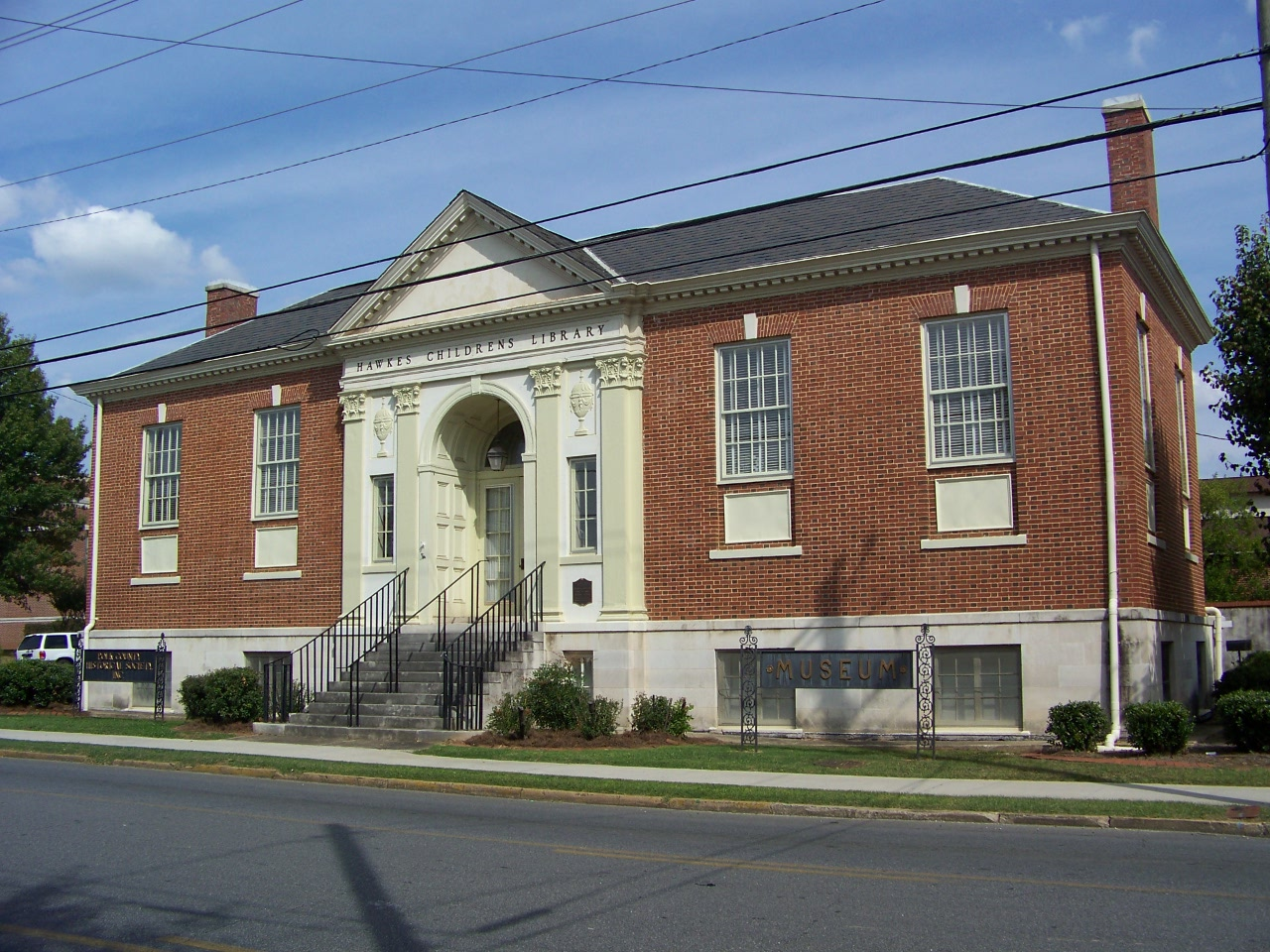
Hawkes Children's Library (Cedartown, Georgia)

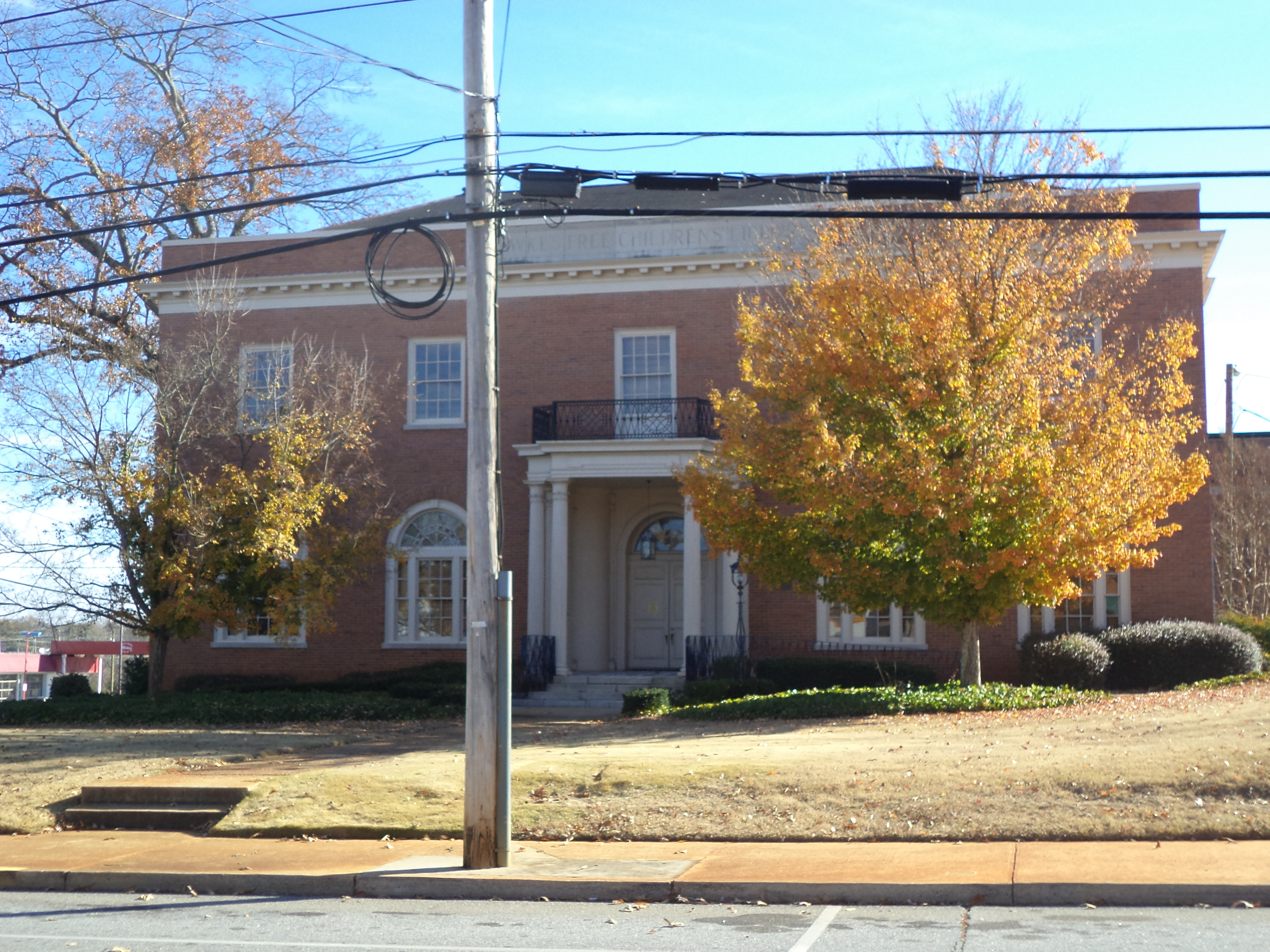
Hawkes Children's Library (Griffin, Georgia)

Albert King Hawkes (June 1848 – November 1916) was an optometrist, inventor, and philanthropist and proponent of children's libraries in rural Georgia towns. Several Hawkes Children's Library buildings were constructed from his advocacy and charitable work. Some of the libraries included theaters. Hawkes planned to build 100 new libraries in Georgia. He helped fund several in his will. The Hawkes Children's Library of West Point and Hawkes Children's Library (Cedartown, Georgia) are listed on the National Register of Historic Places.

== Libraries ==
- Hawkes Children's Library (West Point, Georgia)
- Hawkes Children's Library (Cedartown, Georgia)
- Hawkes Children's Library (Griffin, Georgia)
- Hawkes Children's Library (Roswell, Georgia)
