= Big Spring Park (Cedartown, Georgia) =

Park with a spring in Cedertown, Georgia, US

Coordinates: 34.014366°N 85.258530°W

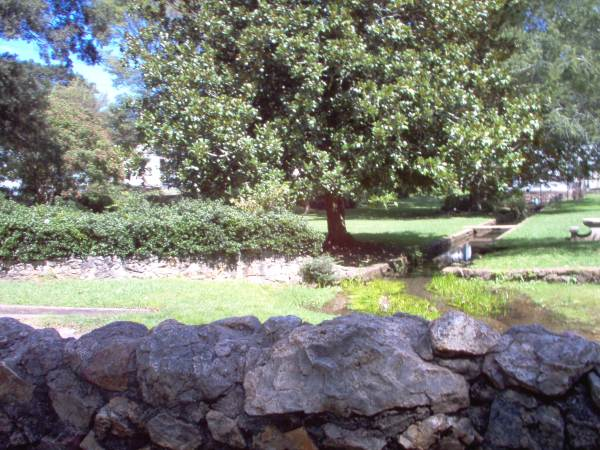
Big Spring is both a historic park and a major supply of potable water.

Big Spring Park in Cedartown, Georgia contains a large limestone spring producing up to four million gallons of water per day providing water to 10,000 people in the area. The Cedartown Waterworks-Woman's building and the Big Spring Park are listed on the National Register of Historic Place

== History ==
The original white settlers who moved into this area of northwest Georgia centered their activities around this spring, calling their town "Big Spring". Asa Prior purchased the land around Big Spring in 1834. In 1852, Prior deeded the spring and adjacent land to the newly charted city of Cedartown.

In more recent times, the spring was turned into a park. A modern water treatment facility was installed on the site at 301 Wissahickon Avenue, which pumps water via pipelines to the surrounding areas. In 2000, the American Water Works Association named the Cedartown Water Plant an American Water Landmark.

== Images ==
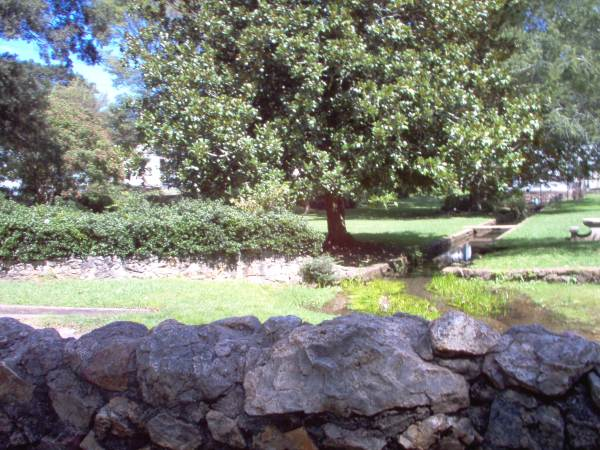
Big Spring Park

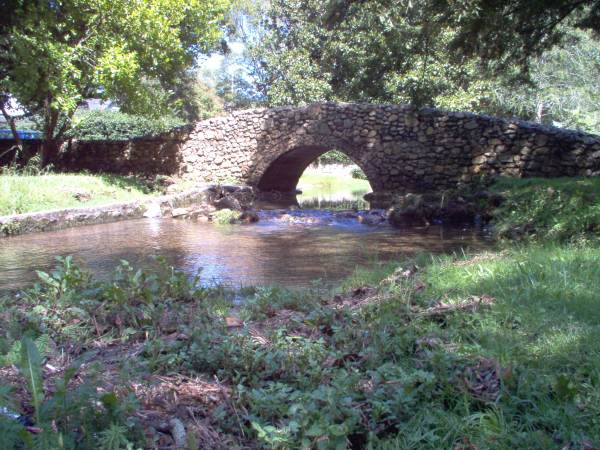
The Big Spring Park bridge

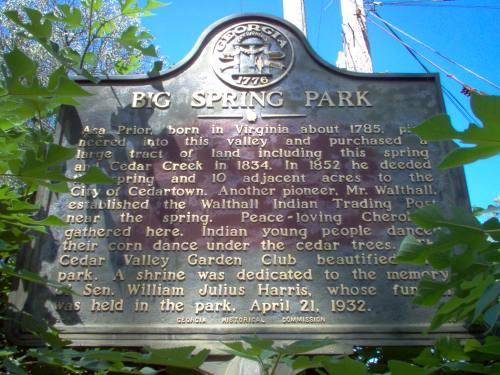
The Big Spring Park Sign
