= Seymour C.Y. Cheng =

American diplomat

Seymour C.Y. Cheng (1902–1954) was an American diplomat of Chinese heritage.

== Career ==
Cheng received Ph.D. from Columbia University in 1931. He worked in the Ministry of Foreign Affairs most of his career. His last assignment was Counselor of the Chinese Embassy in London. Cheng held this position until 1950.
