= Clarence J. Lebel =

American inventor

Clarence Joseph Lebel (December 16, 1905 – April 14, 1965) was an American inventor of the fluorescent lamp and holder of nine other patents, first President of Audio Instrument Company, and first president of Audio Engineering Society.

== Career ==
- Honorary member and fellow of AES
- Fellow of Radio Club of America
- 10 patents, including one on fluorescent lamp
