= Henry Pfeiffer =

Henry Pfeiffer (1857–1939) was president of William R. Warner Co., manufacturing pharmaceutists, and a philanthropist. According to his New York Times obituary, he made large donations to educational institutions and the Methodist church.

== Career and personal life ==
Pfeiffer founded Pfeiffer Chemical Company in 1901. In 1908 he acquired William R. Warner Co. Under Pfeiffer's leadership William R. Warner became a leading drug company.
