= Victory, Saratoga County, New York =

Victory
- Village
- Village of Victory
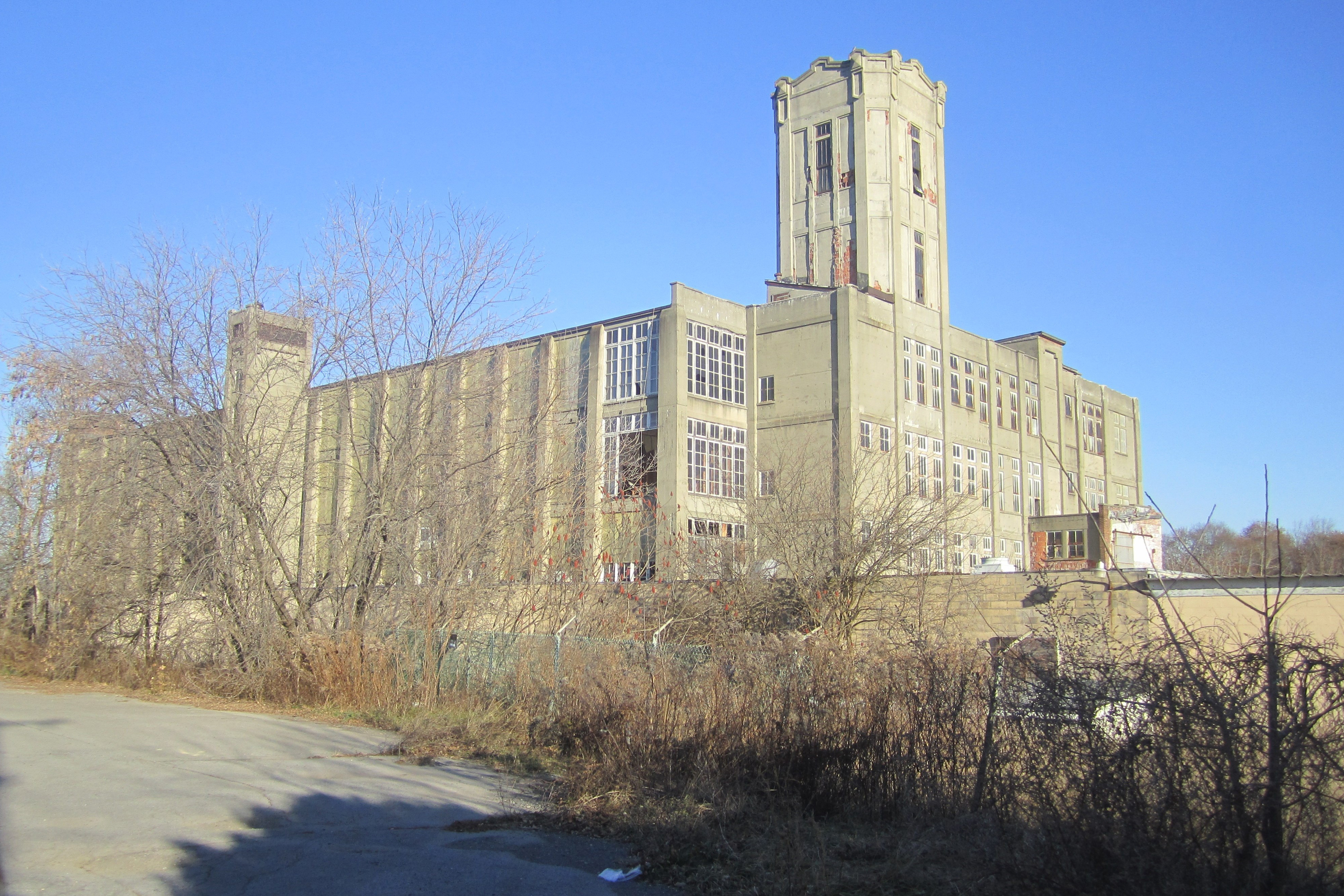
- The Victory Mills
- Motto: Home of the Saratoga Battle Monument
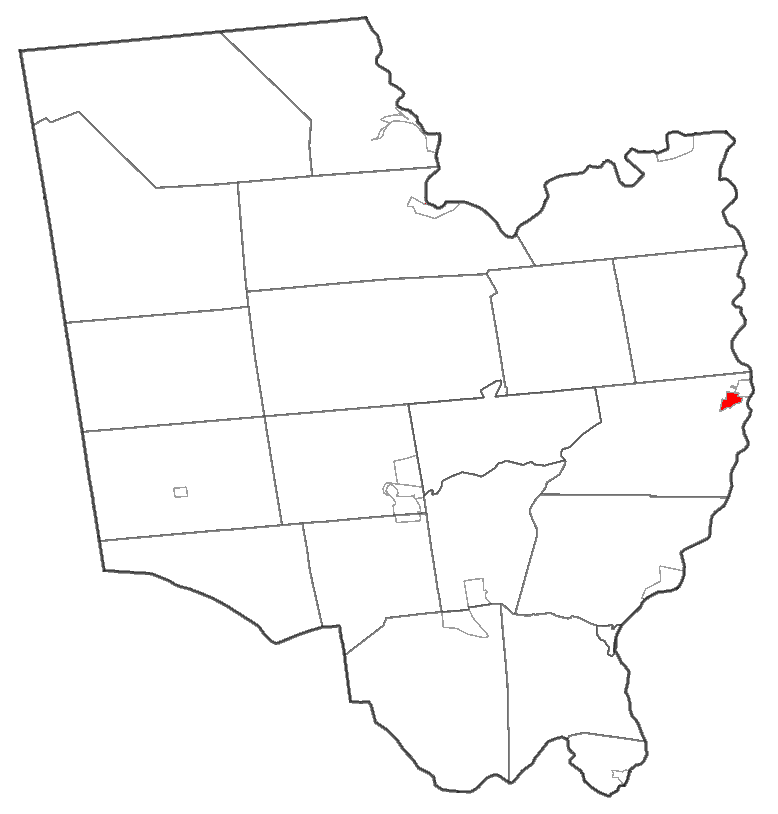
- Map highlighting Victory's location within Saratoga County.

- Location within the state of New York
- Coordinates: 43°5′19″N 73°35′37″W
- Country: United States
- State: New York
- County: Saratoga
- Town: Saratoga
- Incorporated: 1849

Government
  - Mayor: Corey Helwig

Area
  - Total: 0.53 sq mi (1.36 km^{2})
  - Land: 0.53 sq mi (1.36 km^{2})
  - Water: 0 sq mi (0.00 km^{2})

Population (2020)
  - Total: 666
  - Density: 1,267.4/sq mi (489.34/km^{2})
- Time zone: UTC-5 (Eastern (EST))
  - Summer (DST): UTC-4 (EDT)
- Postal code: 12884
- Area code: 518
- FIPS code: 36-77431
- Website: https://www.villageofvictory.com/

Victory is a village in Saratoga County, New York, United States. The population was 666 at the 2020 census. The village is located in the northeastern part of the town of Saratoga, southwest of and bordering the village of Schuylerville. Victory is one of the smallest villages in New York.

== History ==
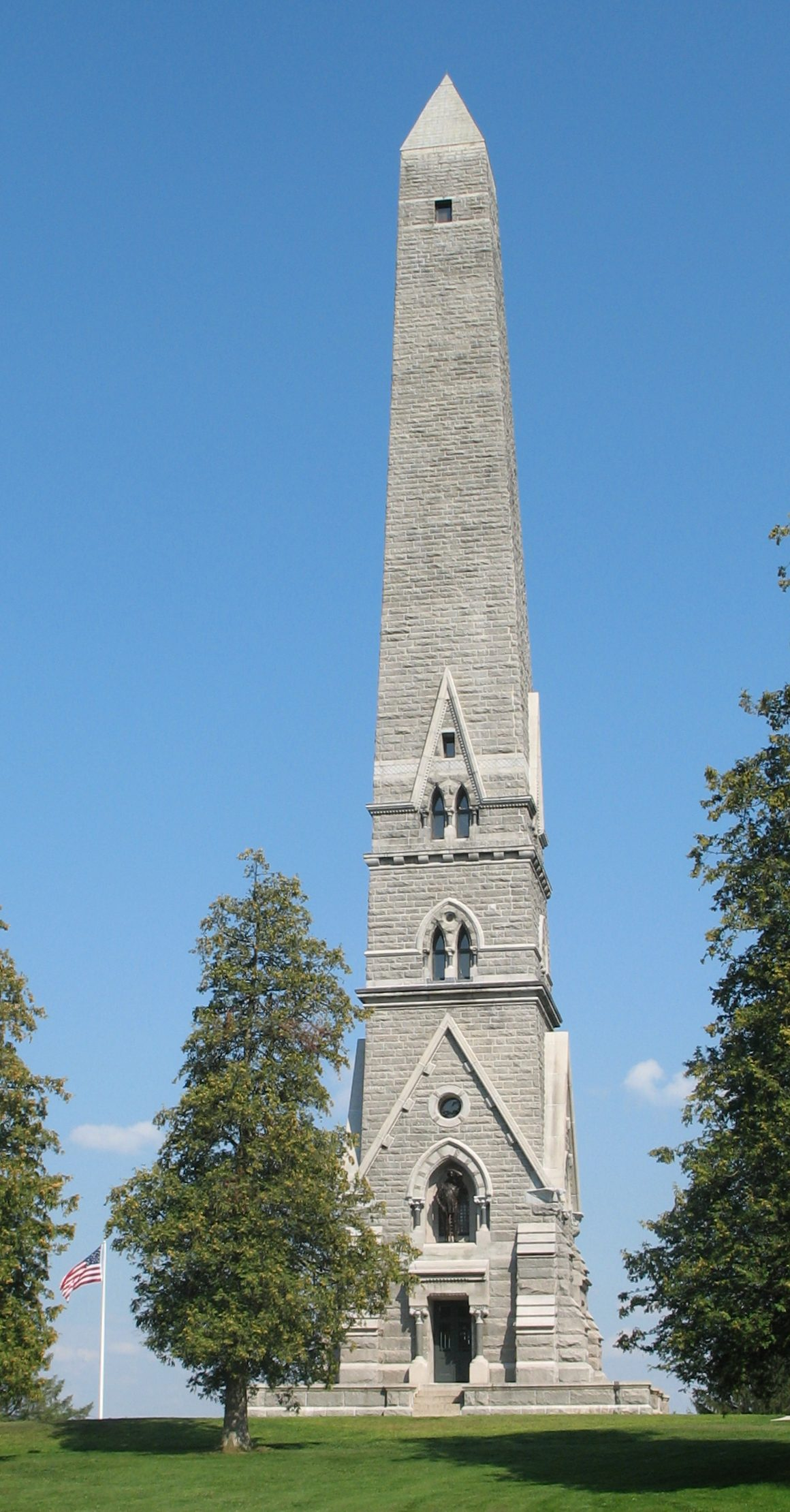
The Saratoga Monument of 1883 commemorates the surrender of the British General Burgoyne to American General Gates in 1777, an event that historians note as the "Turning Point of the American Revolution."

The village was incorporated in 1849. The name Victory is most certainly to commemorate the defeat of the British at the Battles of Saratoga, where Burgoyne surrendered his sword to Gates.

The village has also been called "Victory Mills" due to the large (now defunct) cotton mill of the Saratoga Victory Manufacturing Company. The company operated there from 1846 to 1929 and was centrally located on the primary road through town, Gates Avenue. The US Postal Service refers to the village's ZIP code as Victory Mills.

The Victory Mills building was listed on the National Register of Historic Places on January 19, 2010.

== Geography ==
Victory is located at 43°5′19″N 73°35′37″W (43.088514, -73.593563).

According to the United States Census Bureau, the village has a total area of 0.5 square mile (1.4 km^{2}), all land.

The village is located on the north bank of Fish Creek, a tributary of the nearby Hudson River.

New York State Route 32, Gates Avenue, passes through the village.

== Demographics ==
Historical population
Census	Pop.	Note	%±
1860	636		—
1870	870		36.8%
1880	1,120		28.7%
1890	822		−26.6%
1900	795		−3.3%
1910	748		−5.9%
1920	725		−3.1%
1930	473		−34.8%
1940	520		9.9%
1950	488		−6.2%
1960	497		1.8%
1970	718		44.5%
1980	571		−20.5%
1990	581		1.8%
2000	544		−6.4%
2010	605		11.2%
2020	666		10.1%
U.S. Decennial Census

As of the census of 2000, there were 544 people, 189 households, and 144 families residing in the village. The population density was 1,030.7 inhabitants per square mile (398.0/km^{2}). There were 216 housing units at an average density of 409.2 per square mile (158.0/km^{2}). The racial makeup of the village was 97.61% White, 0.55% African American, 0.37% Native American, and 1.47% from two or more races. Hispanic or Latino of any race were 1.29% of the population.

There were 189 households, out of which 46.6% had children under the age of 18 living with them, 54.5% were married couples living together, 13.8% had a female householder with no husband present, and 23.8% were non-families. 18.5% of all households were made up of individuals, and 10.1% had someone living alone who was 65 years of age or older. The average household size was 2.88 and the average family size was 3.19.

In the village, the population was spread out, with 30.1% under the age of 18, 7.5% from 18 to 24, 32.2% from 25 to 44, 17.3% from 45 to 64, and 12.9% who were 65 years of age or older. The median age was 35 years. For every 100 females, there were 95.7 males. For every 100 females age 18 and over, there were 103.2 males.

The median income for a household in the village was $41,250, and the median income for a family was $37,292. Males had a median income of $29,219 versus $22,656 for females. The per capita income for the village was $17,484. About 10.7% of families and 9.1% of the population were below the poverty line, including 10.8% of those under age 18 and 2.4% of those age 65 or over.
