= Rockmart, Georgia =

City in Georgia, US

The City of Rockmart
- City
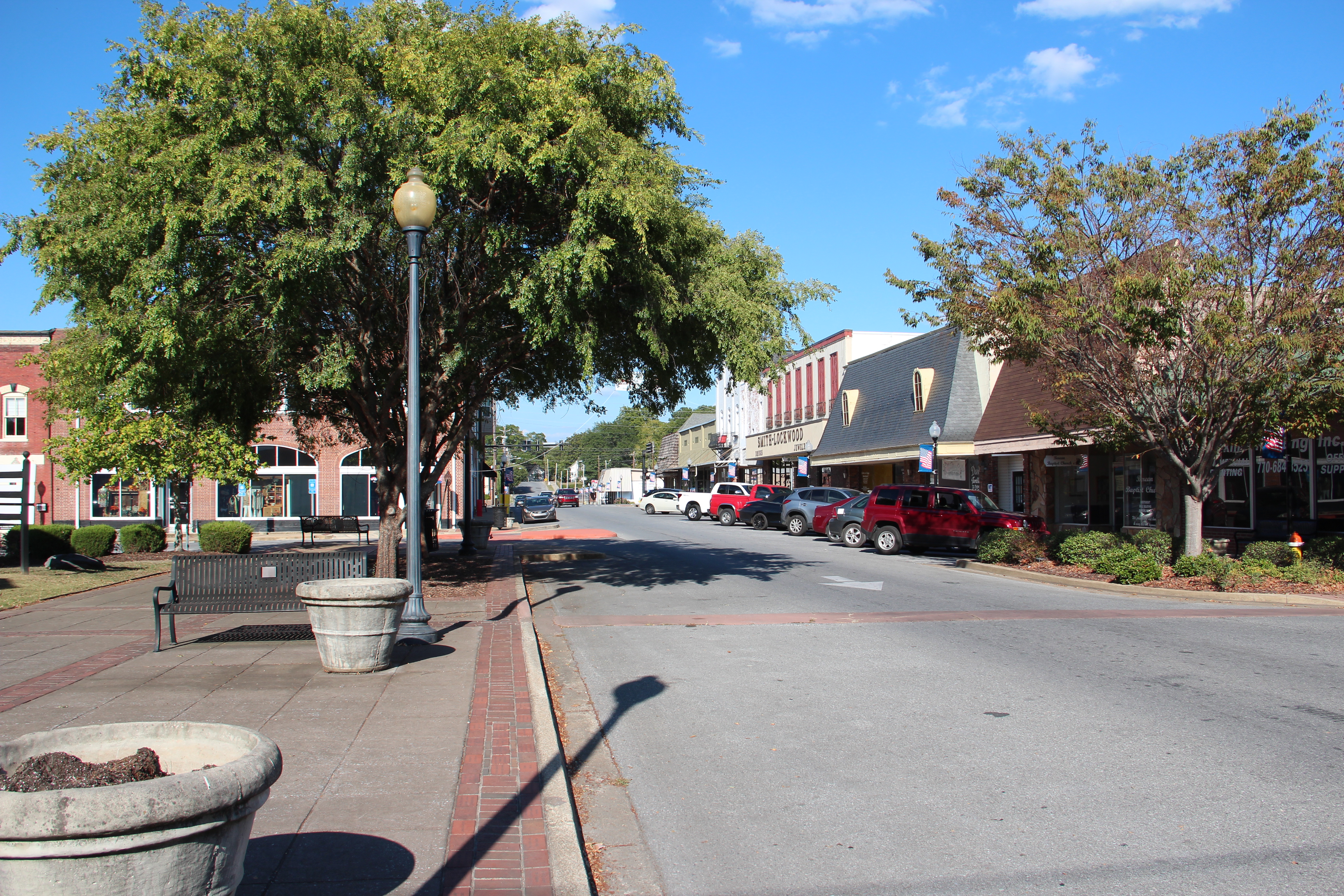
- Rockmart Downtown Historic District

- Flag Seal
- Motto(s): "Where Past & Present Stroll Side by Side in the dark of the day or light of the night!!!"
- Location in Polk County in the state of Georgia
- Coordinates: 34°0′14″N 85°2′57″W
- Country: United States of America
- State: (Georgia (U.S. state)) Georgia
- County: Polk

Government
  - Type: Mayor-Council
  - Mayor: Sherman Ross
  - City Manager: Stacey Smith
  - City Clerk: Jada Edwards

Area
  - Total: 5.71 sq mi (14.80 km^{2})
  - Land: 5.64 sq mi (14.61 km^{2})
  - Water: 0.073 sq mi (0.19 km^{2})
- Elevation: 781 ft (238 m)

Population (2020)
  - Total: 4,732
  - Estimate (2024): 5,012
  - Density: 838.7/sq mi (323.82/km^{2})
- Time zone: UTC-5 (Eastern (EST))
  - Summer (DST): UTC-4 (EDT)
- ZIP code: 30153
- Area codes: 770/678/470/943
- FIPS code: 13-66276
- GNIS feature ID: 0356502
- Website: City of Rockmart, Georgia Official Website

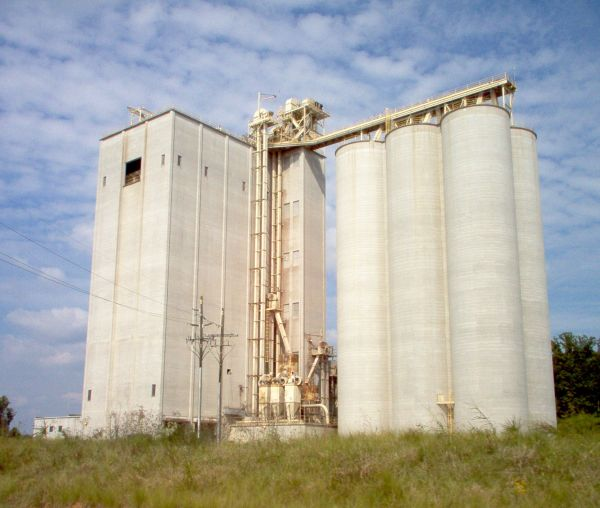
Rockmart was named for its economic position as a major quarry and rock market.

Rockmart is a town in Polk County, Georgia, United States. Its population was 4,732 at the 2020 census. It developed as a railroad depot town when the Southern Railway built a station in the area. The community was incorporated in 1872, and was named from abundant deposits of slate in the area. The Rockmart Downtown Historic District is listed on the National Register of Historic Places.

== Geography ==
Rockmart is located at 34°00′14″N 85°02′57″W. According to the United States Census Bureau, the city has a total area of 4.4 square miles (11 km^{2}), of which 4.3 square miles (11 km^{2}) is land and 0.04 square miles (0.10 km^{2}) (0.69%) is water. Most of the town is in Polk County; parts of it also stretches into Paulding County.

U.S. Route 278, and Georgia State Routes 101 and 113, are the major roads through the town. U.S. 278 runs from west to east as a northern bypass, leading southeast 15 mi (24 km) to Dallas and west 14 mi (23 km) to Cedartown, the Polk County seat. GA-101 runs along the northern bypass of the town with U.S. 278, leading north 20 mi (32 km) to Rome and southeast 8 mi (13 km) to Yorkville (concurrent with GA-113). GA-113 also follows U.S. 278/GA-101 along the northern bypass of the town, leading northeast 19 mi (31 km) to Cartersville and southeast to Yorkville (concurrent with GA-101).

== Demographics ==
Historical population
Census	Pop.	Note	%±
1880	450		—
1890	411		−8.7%
1900	575		39.9%
1910	1,034		79.8%
1920	1,400		35.4%
1930	3,264		133.1%
1940	3,764		15.3%
1950	3,821		1.5%
1960	3,938		3.1%
1970	3,857		−2.1%
1980	3,623		−6.1%
1990	3,356		−7.4%
2000	3,870		15.3%
2010	4,199		8.5%
2020	4,732		12.7%
U.S. Decennial Census

=== 2020 census ===
As of the 2020 census, Rockmart had a population of 4,732. There were 1,856 households, including 1,131 families, in the city.

The median age was 36.9 years. 26.1% of residents were under the age of 18 and 15.3% were age 65 or older. For every 100 females, there were 88.5 males, and for every 100 females age 18 and over, there were 82.3 males age 18 and over.

92.2% of residents lived in urban areas, while 7.8% lived in rural areas.

Of the 1,856 households, 36.1% had children under age 18 living in them. Of all households, 35.9% were married-couple households, 18.5% had a male householder with no spouse or partner present, and 38.4% had a female householder with no spouse or partner present. About 29.7% of all households were made up of individuals, and 14.1% had someone living alone who was age 65 or older.

There were 2,007 housing units, of which 7.5% were vacant. The homeowner vacancy rate was 2.0%, and the rental vacancy rate was 5.3%.

Rockmart racial composition
Race	Num.	Perc.
White (non-Hispanic)	3,166	66.91%
Black or African American (non-Hispanic)	1,097	23.18%
Native American	14	0.3%
Asian	56	1.18%
Pacific Islander	1	0.02%
Other/mixed	237	5.01%
Hispanic or Latino	161	3.4%

== Economy ==
Beginning in the mid-1990s, Rockmart experienced a period of economic expansion. Growth in the form of new restaurants and casual dining, as well as retail shopping, came about as residential building increased.

== Culture ==
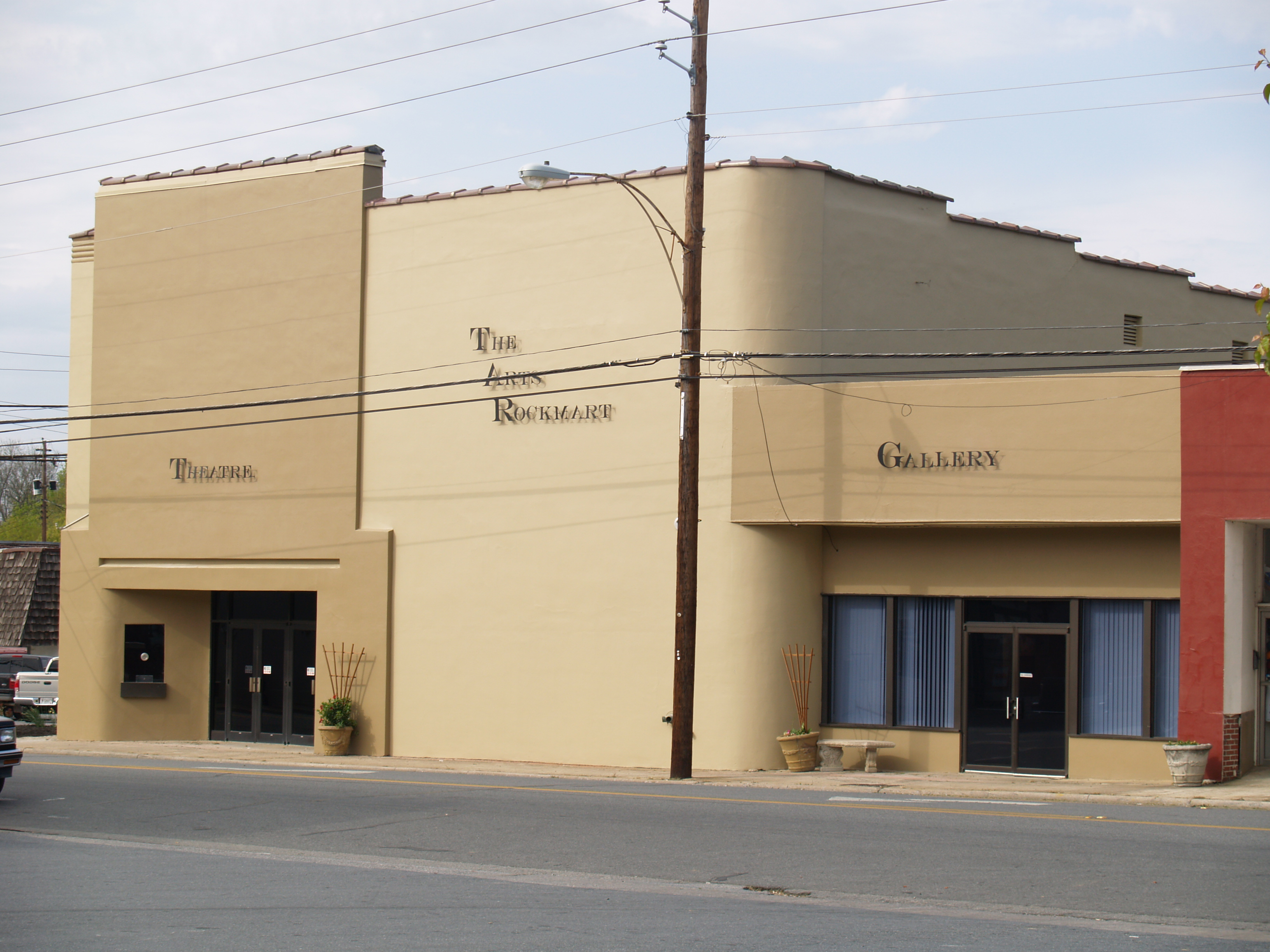
Rockmart Art Center Theatre

=== Arts and theater ===
The Drama Department at Rockmart High School is known for its involvement with the community and every spring the advanced acting class performs at a GHSA One-act play competition. When the new Rockmart High School was constructed, performance space was not included. Instead, the Rockmart Thespians use the historic Rockmart Art Center Theatre for their productions. The department has produced many theatrical feats. In October 2008, the Rockmart High School Thespians placed first at the Region AA One Act Competition with their performance of Godspell, as well as receiving the Best Actor award. The RHS Thespians then took the show to the State AA One Act Competition and placed 3rd out of four schools. In 2013, Rockmart Thespians placed first in the State AAA One Act Competition.

=== Music ===
Another important addition to the performing arts in Rockmart is the Rockmart High Marching Yellow Jacket band. The band won a best in show at the 2006 and 2008 Golden River Marching Festival. In those competitions, both band and auxiliary sections (such as the drumline, tubas, colorguard and danceline) were regarded as being among the best in Northwest Georgia. RHS host the annual Yellow Jacket Classic band competition every year, and is well attended by bands all over the state.

=== Rockmart in the movies ===
The movie Irresistible produced by Jon Stewart was filmed in the Seaborn Jones Park, historic downtown Rockmart, and Rockmart Middle School. Downtown Rockmart was the location of the fictional Deerlaken, Wisconsin.

== Parks and recreation ==
Parks and recreation areas in Rockmart include the Nathan Dean Complex, the Silver Comet Trail & Riverwalk Park, as well as Rockmart City Parks.

== Government ==
Rockmart operates under a council-manager form of government. The city is divided into five council wards, each electing one member to the council. The city's mayor serves as chairman of the council, and is its sixth member. The mayor and council, together, appoint the city manager. Other appointed positions include the city clerk, city attorney, city auditor, and city court judge.

== Education ==
The city of Rockmart is a part of the Polk County School District. It has one high school, Rockmart High School; one middle school, Rockmart Middle School; and two elementary schools, Eastside Elementary and Van Wert Elementary. Rockmart High School is the only high school in the city of Rockmart and serves the Aragon community as well. As of the 2011/12 school year, the school had an enrollment of 837 students and 50.10 classroom teachers (on an FTE basis), for a student-teacher ratio of 16.71.

In 1912, the Georgia Legislature created the public school system in the state of Georgia. That year, the city of Rockmart began the Rockmart School System in the building vacated by the Piedmont Institution (established in 1889 by the Methodist North Georgia Annual Conference). It had closed after a 23-year existence in 1912, after it was purchased by the Rockmart School Board of trustees. Rockmart High School was in the building until it burned down in 1915. The building was later rebuilt until the building burned down again in 1940. The current lot is now the Rockmart Governmental Complex. Prior to the Polk County School System of Georgia, RHS had its own city school system and rival school Cedartown High School also had its own city school system in Cedartown.

The Polk County campus of Georgia Northwestern Technical College is also located in Rockmart.

=== Racial integration ===
Prior to the racial integration of the Polk County School System, two high schools existed in Rockmart—Rockmart High School and Elm Street High School—which served the African American community of Rockmart. The integration of the school system began in the year 1964 when some African American students began attending Rockmart High School until total integration was achieved in 1965 with the closing of Elm Street High School.

== Transportation ==
=== Rail ===
The Southern Railway had two Mid-West to Florida named trains, Ponce de Leon and Royal Palm, that made stops in the town into the 1960s. The Seaboard Air Line Railroad, had the Silver Comet, which made a stop in Rockmart on all trips between Atlanta and Birmingham. The Passenger and Mail #5 and #6 made stops in Rockmart, until it was cancelled in 1968. The Silver Comet continued on the merged Seaboard Coast Line, which discontinued the train on May 30, 1969.

=== Roads ===
U.S. Route 278 and Georgia State Route 6 run through the town.

== Notable people ==
- Fred P. Branson (1881–1960), native of Rockmart; Oklahoma attorney, judge and politician; served as associate justice of Oklahoma Supreme Court
- Bill Calhoun, former Major League Baseball first baseman for the Boston Braves.
- Nathan Dean, former Georgia State Senator from the 31st District
- Brody Malone, gymnast and two-time Olympian (2020 and 2024)
- Danny Ware, former running back for the NFL New York Giants.
- Danny Roberts (media personality), recruiter, LGBTQ+ rights advocate, and former reality TV personality.
