= Rockmart High School =

Public high school in Rockmart, Georgia, United States

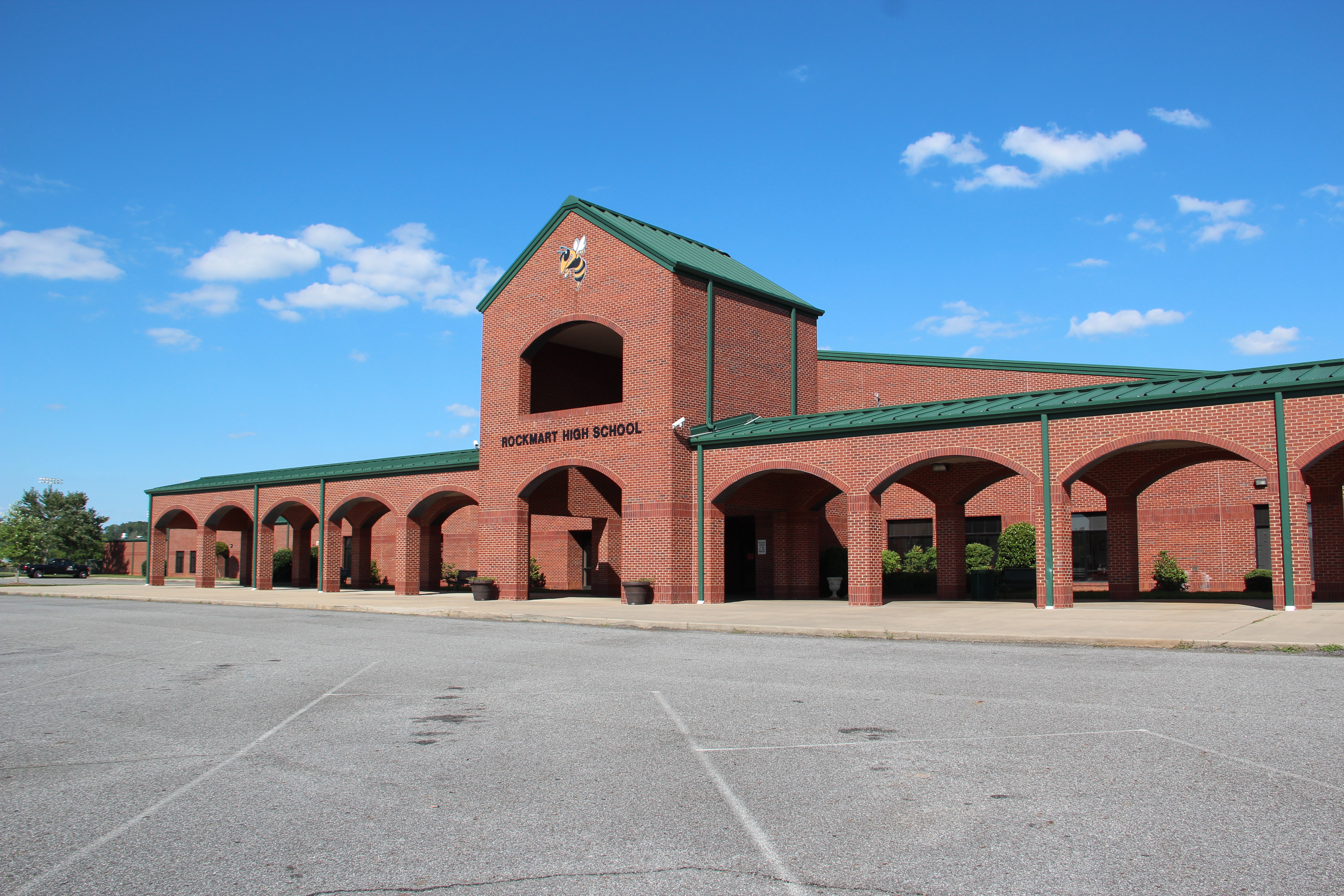

Location
- 990 Cartersville Highway; Rockmart, Polk County, Georgia 30153; United States; 34°01′20″N 85°01′10″W

Information
- School type: Public school, high school
- Established: 1912
- School district: Polk County School District
- NCES District ID: 1304200
- NCES School ID: 130420001509
- Principal: Bo Adams
- Faculty: 52.50 (on an FTE basis)
- Grades: 9–12
- Enrollment: 967 (2023–2024)
- Student to teacher ratio: 18.42
- Campus: Suburban
- Colors: Black and gold
- Fight song: Notre Dame Victory March
- Athletics conference: 7-AA
- Mascot: Yellow Jacket
- Nickname: The Fighting Yellow Jackets
- Accreditation: Southern Association of Colleges and Schools
- Website: www.polk.k12.ga.us/o/rhs

Rockmart High School (RHS) also known as the Fighting Yellow Jackets is the only high school in Rockmart, Georgia, United States. It is fed by Rockmart Middle School and by the Aragon community. As of the 2023–24 school year, the school had an enrollment of 967 students and a faculty of 52.50 classroom teachers (on an FTE basis), for a student-teacher ratio of 18.42

== History ==
In 1912, the Georgia Legislature created the state's public school system. That year, the city of Rockmart began the Rockmart School System in the building vacated by the Piedmont Institution (established in 1889 by the Methodist North Georgia Annual Conference). It had closed after a 23-year existence in 1912 after it was purchased by the Rockmart School Board of trustees. Rockmart High School was in the building for three years, until the building burned down in 1915. The building was later rebuilt, but the building burned down again in 1940. The current lot is now the Rockmart Governmental Complex. Prior to the Polk County School System of Georgia, RHS had its own city school system and Cedartown High School also had its own city school system in Cedartown.

=== Racial integration ===
Before the racial integration of the Polk County School System, two high schools existed in Rockmart - RHS and Elm Street High School, which served the African American community of Rockmart. The integration of the school system began in 1966, when some African American students began attending Rockmart High School. Total integration was achieved in 1967, with the closing of Elm Street High School.

== Demographics ==
According to a NCES 2023-24 school year census, the racial makeup of the school was 646 White, 184 African American, 4 Asian, 77 of two or more races, and 55 Hispanic or Latino. Of those students 504 were male and 463 female.

== Extracurricular activities ==
=== Clubs ===
Rockmart High School has 18 clubs.

=== Athletics ===
Rockmart High School competes in Region 6 of the AAA Class. It sponsors 38 athletic teams on campus, with both boys and girls participating in varsity, junior varsity, and 9th grade competitions. RHS athletics are sponsored by many local businesses. Rockmart's first football team was established in 1923. The team of 1950 beat Valdosta High School for the state title and went on to beat Holyoke High School in the Peanut Bowl, giving them bragging rights as National Champions.

=== Drama ===
Every spring the advanced acting class performs at a GHSA one-act play competition. When the new Rockmart High School was constructed, performance space was not included. Instead, the Rockmart Thespians use the Rockmart Art Center Theatre for their productions. The department has produced many theatrical feats such as Seussical, Grease Hairspray. In October 2008, the Rockmart High School Thespians placed first at the Region AA One Act Competition with their performance of Godspell. The RHS Thespians then took the show to the State AA One Act Competition and placed third out of four schools. In 2013, Rockmart Thespians placed first in the State AAA One Act Competition with a production of the thriller When You Comin' Back, Red Ryder?.

== Notable alumni ==
- Nathan Dean, Georgia State Senator from the 31st District
- Ty Floyd, baseball player in the Cincinnati Reds organization
- Danny Ware, former running back for the New York Giants

== See also ==
- Polk County School District, Georgia
- Education in Georgia
- List of high schools in Georgia
