= Piedmont Institution =

Coordinates: 33°59′56″N 85°2′25″W

Piedmont Institute
- Rockmart, (Polk County), GA 30153; United States

Information
- School type: Private school, High school
- Established: 1889
- Founder: Methodist North Georgia Annual Conference
- Closed: 1912
- Grades: 9–11
- Campus: Rural

The Piedmont Institute (1889-1912) was the original high school in the city of Rockmart, Georgia. Established in 1889 by the Methodist North Georgia Annual Conference. The Piedmont Institute building is no longer standing and is replaced by the current high school Rockmart High School. The Rockmart School System of trustees purchased the original structure in 1912 and began the public school system. The structure then burn down in 1915 and was rebuilt; however, it burned down again in 1940. The lot for the previous high school is now where the Rockmart Government Complex is located. The first president of the Piedmont Institute was E. W. Ballenger—a widely known preacher and educator in the Rockmart Community.

== History ==
Rockmart in 1889 was limited to six elementary school grades. The demand was not there for much higher education due to child labor laws that allowed children as young as eight years old to work in factories, or on the farm. It was not because a family did not wish their children to have more education; it was just simply not feasible or affordable. There were many parents that did wish for a higher education level and a better way of life for their children and promoted this ideal to the churches that they attend.

== Curriculum ==
To graduate from Piedmont Institute required four years of English language, four years of Latin language, two years of French language, four years of mathematics, four years of Social Science, one year of botany, and one year of chemistry. In addition, one lesson a week in Bible study was required for the high school students. Instrumental and vocal music lessons were taught, and excellence in oratory was encouraged. There was no program in Physical Education and no competitive sports.
