= Etna, Georgia =

Unincorporated community in Georgia, U.S.

Coordinates: 34°00′27″N 85°23′44″W

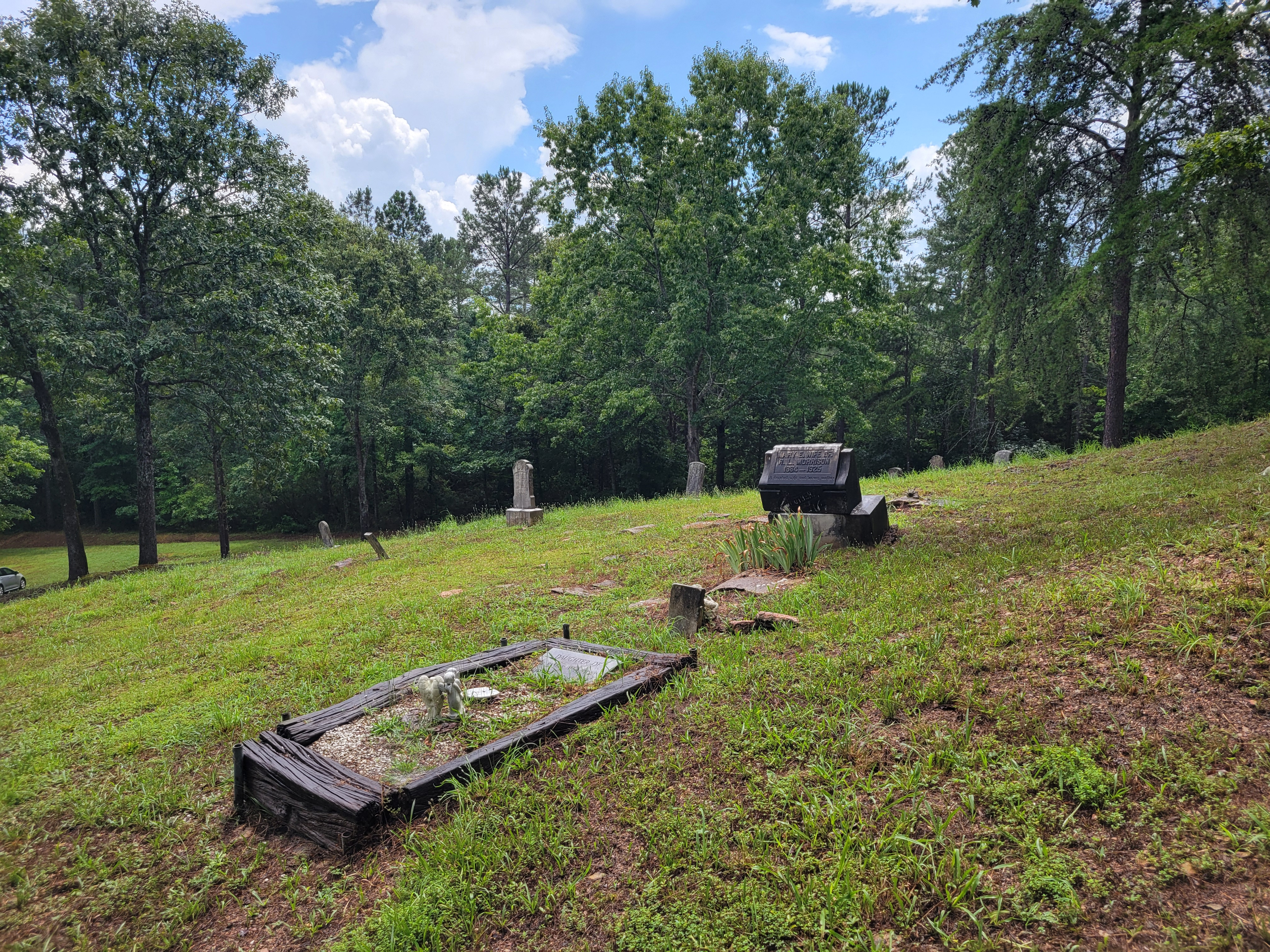
Etna Cemetery

Etna is an unincorporated community in Polk County, in the U.S. state of Georgia.

== History ==
The community was named after nearby Etna Mountain. The Georgia General Assembly incorporated the place in 1892 as the "Town of Etna". The town's municipal charter was repealed in 1995.
