= Polk County School District =

Polk County School District may refer to

- Polk County School District, Florida
- Polk County School District, Georgia
