= Trey Kelley =

American politician

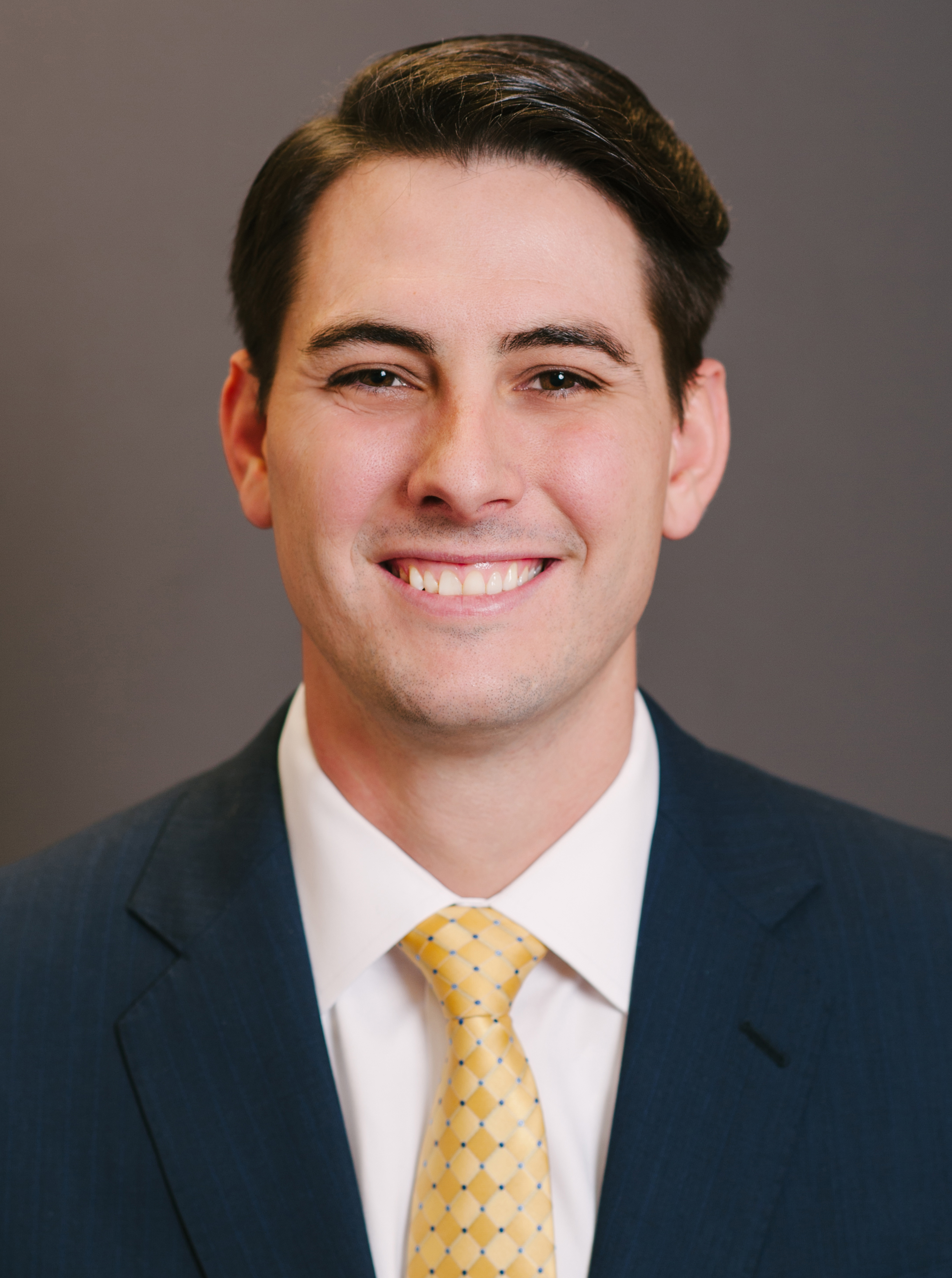
- Trey Kelley in 2012

Member of the Georgia House of Representatives from the 16th district
- Incumbent
- Assumed office January 14, 2013
- Preceded by: Rick Crawford

Personal details
- Born: Othel Doyle Kelley; July 23, 1987 (age 39) Cedartown, Georgia, U.S.
- Party: Republican
- Spouse: Amy Marvin Kelley (2008-2022) Savannah Kelley (m. 2024)
- Education: Shorter College; Georgia State University (J.D.)

Othel Doyle Kelley (born July 23, 1987) is an American politician and lawyer. He served as the Republican Majority Whip of the Georgia House of Representatives until July 2021 from House District 16, covering much of Bartow, Haralson, and Polk Counties.

Kelley was first elected to the Georgia House of Representatives in 2012 after beating a Democratic incumbent.

== Indictment ==
Kelley was indicted December 9, 2020, following an investigation into a vehicular homicide resulting from a hit and run crash in Cedartown, Georgia. The driver of the vehicle involved, Ralph "Ryan" Dover III, left the scene of the accident, calling Kelley from a mile away. Kelley, who saw the vehicle, contacted the Cedartown police chief at his home phone number as opposed to calling 911, constituting a "gross deviation from the standard of care which a reasonable person would exercise in the situation," the indictment said. The man hit by Dover died in a ditch during the hour period before emergency services were summoned. A judge dismissed a misdemeanor charge and indictment against Kelley in December 2021.

In 2026, the Georgia Court of Appeals ruled that a lawsuit against Kelley could proceed.

== Committee assignments ==
Representative Kelley currently serves on the following committees:

- Appropriations (Ex-Officio)
- Code Revision (Member)
- Energy, Utilities, and Telecommunications (Member)
- Health (Vice Chairman)
- Higher Education (Secretary)
- Judiciary
- Rules (Secretary)
- Ways and Means (Vice Chairman)
