= Polk County School District, Georgia =

School district in Georgia (U.S. state)

Polk County School District

Address
- 612 South College Street Cedartown, Polk, Georgia, 30125-3522; United States
- Coordinates: 34.007540°N 85.256742°W

District information
- Grades: Pre-school - 12
- Superintendent: Dr. Katherine M. Thomas
- Accreditations: Southern Association of Colleges and Schools; Georgia Accrediting Commission
- NCES District ID: 1304200

Students and staff
- Enrollment: 8,054
- Faculty: 530

Other information
- Telephone: (770) 748-3821
- Fax: (770) 748-5131
- Website: www.polk.k12.ga.us

The Polk County School District is a public school district in Polk County, Georgia, United States, based in Cedartown. It serves the communities of Aragon, Braswell, Cedartown, Rockmart, and Taylorsville. During the 2020-2021 school year, enrollment was listed as 7,837 across all schools.

== Schools ==
The Polk County School District has six elementary schools, two middle schools, and two high schools.

=== Elementary schools ===
- Northside Elementary School
- Eastside Elementary School
- Westside Elementary School
- Cherokee Elementary School
- Van Wert Elementary School
- Youngs Grove Elementary School

=== Middle school ===
- Cedartown Middle School
- Rockmart Middle School

=== High school ===
- Cedartown High School
- Rockmart High School

=== Academies ===
- York Academy
