= B. Michael Watson =

B. Michael Watson (born July 3, 1949) is a bishop of The United Methodist Church, elected in 2000. He served as resident bishop of the North Georgia Annual Conference, which comprises 1,000 churches, more than 1,500 clergy members, and more than 320,000 lay members. He retired in 2016 and currently serves as ecumenical officer of the Council of Bishops.

== Education ==
Watson received a bachelor of science degree in finance and real estate from the University of Alabama, a master of divinity degree from Candler School of Theology and a doctor of ministry degree from Vanderbilt University.

== Ordained ministry ==
Prior to his election to the episcopacy, Watson served as a pastor in the Alabama-West Florida Conference of The United Methodist Church. He was ordained deacon in 1972 and elder in 1976 in the Alabama-West Florida Annual Conference. He served Decatur First United Methodist Church in Decatur, Georgia, from 1973 to 1974, while he was a student at Candler School of Theology. In his home conference, he served Aldersgate UMC in Molino, Florida, from 1975 to 1977 and Christ UMC in Milton, Florida, from 1977 to 1979. He was founding pastor of Covenant UMC in Dothan, Alabama, where he served from 1979 to 1990. He was appointed to Dauphin Way UMC in Mobile, Alabama, in 1990, where he served until he was elected bishop in the Southeastern Jurisdiction of the United Methodist Church in 2000.

He was consecrated a bishop at a service of consecration held at Lake Junaluska, North Carolina July 15, 2000. Watson served two quadrennia as resident bishop of the South Georgia Annual Conference of The United Methodist Church. In 2008 he was appointed resident bishop of the North Georgia Annual Conference of The United Methodist Church. His office is at The United Methodist Center in the grounds of Simpsonwood Conference and Retreat Center in Norcross, Georgia.

== Boards and committees ==
- Chair, World Methodist Council Personnel Committee
- Delegate, World Methodist Conference: Singapore, 1991; Rio de Janeiro, Brazil, 1996; Brighton, England, 2001; Seoul, Korea, 2006
- Chair, Central Conference Pension Initiative of The United Methodist Church, $25M goal
- Steering Committee Chair, Campaign Emory - Candler School of Theology, $60M goal
- Chair, Board of Directors of the General Board of Pension and Health Benefits 2008-2012

Watson serves on the Board of Trustees for: Gammon Theological School, Clark Atlanta University, Emory University, LaGrange College, Oxford College of Emory University, Paine College, Reinhardt University, Wesleyan College, Young Harris College, United Methodist Children’s Home, Georgia United Methodist Foundation, Camp Glisson, Simpsonwood Conference and Retreat Center, Wesley Woods Senior Living, and the Methodist Foundation for Retired Ministers.

== Publications ==
- The Upper Room, daily devotional, November - December, 1987: United Methodist Publishing House
- The Living Pulpit, April - June, 1998, New York Theological Seminary
- Adult Bible Studies, Fall 2008 Lessons, Nashville, Tennessee: United Methodist Publishing House

== Personal ==
Watson is married to Margaret Lee Watson. They have two adult children, Ben Watson and Elizabeth Watson Riddle, and four grandchildren.

== See also ==
- List of bishops of the United Methodist Church
- Biography of Bishop B. Michael Watson
