= DJ Ware =

American football player (born 1985)

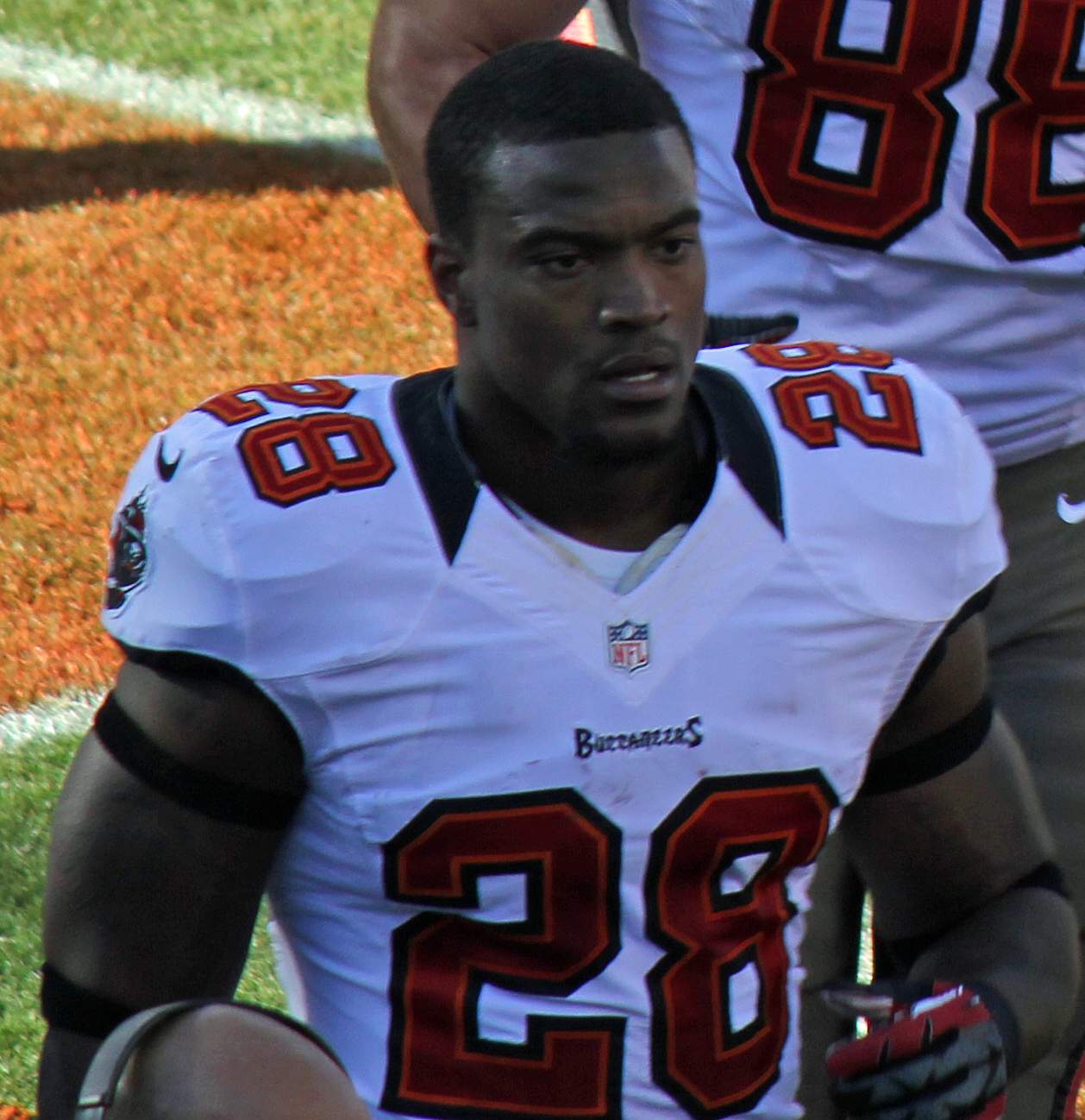
- Ware with the Tampa Bay Buccaneers in 2012

No. 26, 28
- Position: Running back

Personal information
- Born: February 18, 1985 (age 41); Aragon, Georgia, U.S.
- Listed height: 6 ft 1 in (1.85 m)
- Listed weight: 225 lb (102 kg)

Career information
- High school: Rockmart (GA)
- College: Georgia
- NFL draft: 2007: undrafted

Career history
- Tennessee Titans (2007)*; New York Jets (2007)*; New York Giants (2007–2011); Tampa Bay Buccaneers (2012)
- * Offseason or practice squad member only

Awards and highlights
- 2× Super Bowl champion (XLII, XLVI)

Career NFL statistics
- Rushing attempts: 92
- Rushing yards: 375
- Rushing touchdowns: 1
- Receptions: 51
- Receiving yards: 352
- Stats at Pro Football Reference

Danny Franklin "DJ" Ware, Jr. (born February 18, 1985) is an American former professional football player who was a running back in the National Football League (NFL). He played college football for the Georgia Bulldogs and was signed by the Tennessee Titans as an undrafted free agent in 2007.

Ware earned two Super Bowl rings with the New York Giants in Super Bowl XLII and Super Bowl XLVI, both against the New England Patriots. He was also a member of the New York Jets and Tampa Bay Buccaneers.

== Early life ==
Ware attended Rockmart High School (Rockmart, Ga.), home of the Fighting Yellow Jackets, while collecting various honors. He attended Hargrave Military Academy for one year and lettered in football. For the Tigers, he posted 56 rushing attempts for 653 yards (11.66 yards per rush avg.) and four touchdowns.

Ware played running back for the University of Georgia from 2003 to 2006 and was a key part of the 2005 Georgia Bulldogs team that finished 10-3, winning an SEC championship. He began his career by redshirting in 2003. In 2004, Georgia's starting running back Kregg Lumpkin went down with a knee injury in August. Ware had to step into the starter's role on September 3, 2004, against Georgia Southern. Ware responded by rushing 18 times for 135 yards as Georgia got past the Georgia Southern Eagles, 48–28. For all of 2004, he rushed for a team-leading 692 yards and 4 touchdowns on 138 carries as he helped the Bulldogs complete a 10-2 season, ranked No. 7 in the country. Ware totaled 492 rushing yards in 2005 and finished with 302 yards rushing and three touchdowns in 2006 for UGA.

In his career with Georgia, Ware rushed 314 times in three seasons for 1,486 yards and eight touchdowns while collecting 28 receptions for 357 yards with two scores in 28 games.

== Professional career ==
As a member of the New York Giants in 2010, Ware ran for 73 yards on 20 rushes while collecting seven receptions out of the backfield for 67 yards in 14 games. Ware also totaled 73 rushing yards off 13 attempts and had three catches for 15 yards in 2009.

At the end of the 2011 season, Ware and the Giants appeared in Super Bowl XLVI. He had one carry for six yards and one reception for eight yards as the Giants defeated the New England Patriots by a score of 21–17.

In his career with the Giants, Ware has rushed 81 times for 324 yards and one touchdown while catching 10 passes for 82 yards in 29 games that goes back to the 2007 season.

Ware was released by the Giants on August 31, 2012, during the final cuts.

After spending a season with the Tampa Bay Buccaneers, he was released on April 4, 2013, to make room for Darrelle Revis.
