= Ray Beck =

American football player (1931–2007)

No. 65, 61
- Position: Guard

Personal information
- Born: March 17, 1931; Bowdon, Georgia, U.S.
- Died: January 10, 2007 (aged 75); Cedartown, Georgia, U.S.
- Listed height: 6 ft 2 in (1.88 m)
- Listed weight: 224 lb (102 kg)

Career information
- High school: Cedartown
- College: Georgia Tech
- NFL draft: 1952: 2nd round, 23rd overall pick

Career history
- New York Giants (1952, 1955–1957)

Awards and highlights
- NFL champion (1956); First-team All-American (1951); First-team All-SEC (1951)

Career NFL statistics
- Games played: 46
- Games started: 30
- Fumble recoveries: 4
- Stats at Pro Football Reference
- College Football Hall of Fame

Ray Merril Beck (March 17, 1931 – January 10, 2007) was an American professional football player in the National Football League (NFL) for the New York Giants in 1952 and from 1955 to 1957.

Beck was born in Bowdon, Georgia and graduated from Cedartown High School. He played four years at Georgia Tech and had his best season his senior year in 1951, when the Yellow Jackets finished 11–0–1 including a 17–14 victory over Baylor in the Orange Bowl. He was named All-America by the Football Writers Association and the American Football Coaches Association, as well as Most Valuable Lineman in the Southeastern Conference. He missed the 1953–54 seasons due to military service during the Korean War. He later was president of a trucking company in the Atlanta area and was inducted into the College Football Hall of Fame in 1997.
