= Nathan Dean =

American politician

The Honorable Nathan Dean
- Nathan Dean's Senate photograph

Member of the Georgia State Senate from the 31st district
- In office 1975–2004

Member of the Georgia House of Representatives
- In office 1963–1975

Personal details
- Born: May 9, 1934 Rockmart, Georgia
- Died: June 8, 2013 (aged 79) Rockmart, Georgia
- Citizenship: United States
- Party: Democratic
- Education: Shorter University
- Occupation: Insurance executive
- Profession: Career politician

Military service
- Allegiance: United States
- Branch/service: Army
- Years of service: Two

Nathan Dean (May 9, 1934 – June 8, 2013) was an American insurance executive from Rockmart, Georgia, who served 15 consecutive terms in the Georgia General Assembly as Senator for district 31. Dean was first elected to the Senate in 1974 and began serving in 1975. Previously, Dean served for 12 years in the Georgia House of Representatives (1963 – 1975)—and served on the Rockmart City Council. Dean was Chairman of the Senate Democratic Caucus and a member of the Executive Committee of the Democratic Party of Georgia. as Senator, Dean represented both Polk and Haralson County and parts of Bartow and Paulding county as well. Dean has been recognized for his civic duties—seeing the Rockmart community center named in his honor, and being named Senator of the Year by the Georgia Municipal Association.

== Early life ==
Nathan Dean was born at home in a house in Goodyear Village of Rockmart, Georgia on May 9, 1934—the youngest of seven children. He graduated from Rockmart High School and is a graduate of Shorter University as well. Nathan Dean is also a veteran of the U.S. Army. After leaving the Army Dean worked as an insurance executive and he was active in community and civic affairs. His interest in serving the local community led him to pursue politics—beginning his 42 years of public service as a Councilman for the city of Rockmart.

== Political career ==
Dean was known to personally interact with his constituency. Mr. and Mrs. Ray and Shirley Pitts of Acworth, Georgia were surprised in 2001 when they received direct correspondence from the senator after Dean had seen a letter they had written seeking redress of grievances. Dean was indicted in 1992 on a charge of "false writing over the use of [government] grant funds"; however, the charge was dismissed and Dean was re-elected by his constituency who upheld confidence in his integrity.
