= Georgia's 16th House of Representatives district =

State district in Georgia, USA

Georgia's 16th State House of Representatives district
Representative
| Trey Kelley; R–Cedartown |
- Demographics: 76.4% White; 10.4% Black; 10.6% Hispanic; 0.5% Asian
- Population: 53,154

District 16 elects one member of the Georgia House of Representatives. It contains the entirety of Polk County as well as parts of Paulding County.

== Members ==
- Rick Crawford (until 2013)
- Trey Kelley (since 2013)
