= G. Lindsey Davis =

American United Methodist bishop (born 1948)

George Lindsey Davis (born 5 April 1948) is an American bishop of the United Methodist Church, elected in 1996.

== Birth and family ==
Davis was born in Durham, North Carolina. He married Jennifer Mink of Pineville, Kentucky on 20 May 1972. They have two adult children: Laura Ellen Davis Miller, an elementary school teacher in Lexington, Kentucky, and John Lindsey Davis, who works and lives in Atlanta, Georgia.

== Education and ordination ==
Davis earned a B.A. from Union College (Kentucky) (1970), M.S. from the University of Kentucky (1972), M.Div. from Lexington Theological Seminary (1980). He was ordained deacon in 1978 and elder in 1981. He has received a D.D. from Kentucky Wesleyan College (1996) and Union College (1999).

== Service to education ==
Prior to entering the ordained ministry, Mr. Davis was the Assistant Director, Office of Educational Development at the University of Kentucky College of Medicine (1972–75). He also served as the Director, Office of Educational Development at the University of Alabama College of Community Health Sciences (1975–77). He then was a Consultant with the Department of Family Medicine and Pediatrics (1977–78) of the University of Kentucky College of Medicine.

== Ordained ministry ==
Upon entering the ordained ministry of the U.M. Church (Kentucky Annual Conference), Rev. Davis served as Associate Pastor, First U.M.C., Lexington, KY (1978–81), Pastor of the Mayo Memorial U.M.C., Paintsville, Kentucky (1981–85), and Senior Pastor, St. Luke U.M.C., Lexington, KY (1985–94). He then was appointed Superintendent of the Lexington District, Kentucky Annual Conference (1994–96). He was a delegate to Jurisdictional and General Conferences in 1992 and 1996. He also co-chaired the Uniting Transition Team for the Louisville Area, U.M. Church in 1996.

== Episcopal ministry ==
Upon his election as bishop by the Southeastern Jurisdictional Conference of the U.M. Church (July 1996), he was assigned to the North Georgia Episcopal Area (1 September 1996). He served as president of the Southeastern Jurisdictional College of Bishops in 2000.

Davis has or is serving as a trustee of Clark Atlanta University, Emory University, Gammon Theological Seminary, LaGrange College, Paine College, Reinhardt College, Wesleyan College, and Young Harris College. Likewise he has or is serving on the Robert W. Woodruff Health Sciences Center Board of Emory University, the Atlanta Area Council Executive Board of the Boy Scouts of America, the Joint Conference Committee of the Emory University Hospitals, and Emory Children's Center Board. He also was a member of the General Council on Ministries of the U.M. Church (1996–2000), served as a director of the U.M. General Board of Global Ministries, and as president of the United Methodist Committee on Relief (2000–2004). He is currently vice-president of the U.M. General Council on Finance and Administration.

On July 19, 2008, Davis was assigned by the Committee on Episcopacy of the Southeast Jurisdiction to be the new bishop for the Louisville Episcopal Area which includes the Kentucky and Red Bird missionary conferences. The Southeast Jurisdictional Conference meets every four years at Lake Junaluska, North Carolina.

== See also ==
- List of bishops of the United Methodist Church
