= Nick Chubb =

American football player (born 1995)

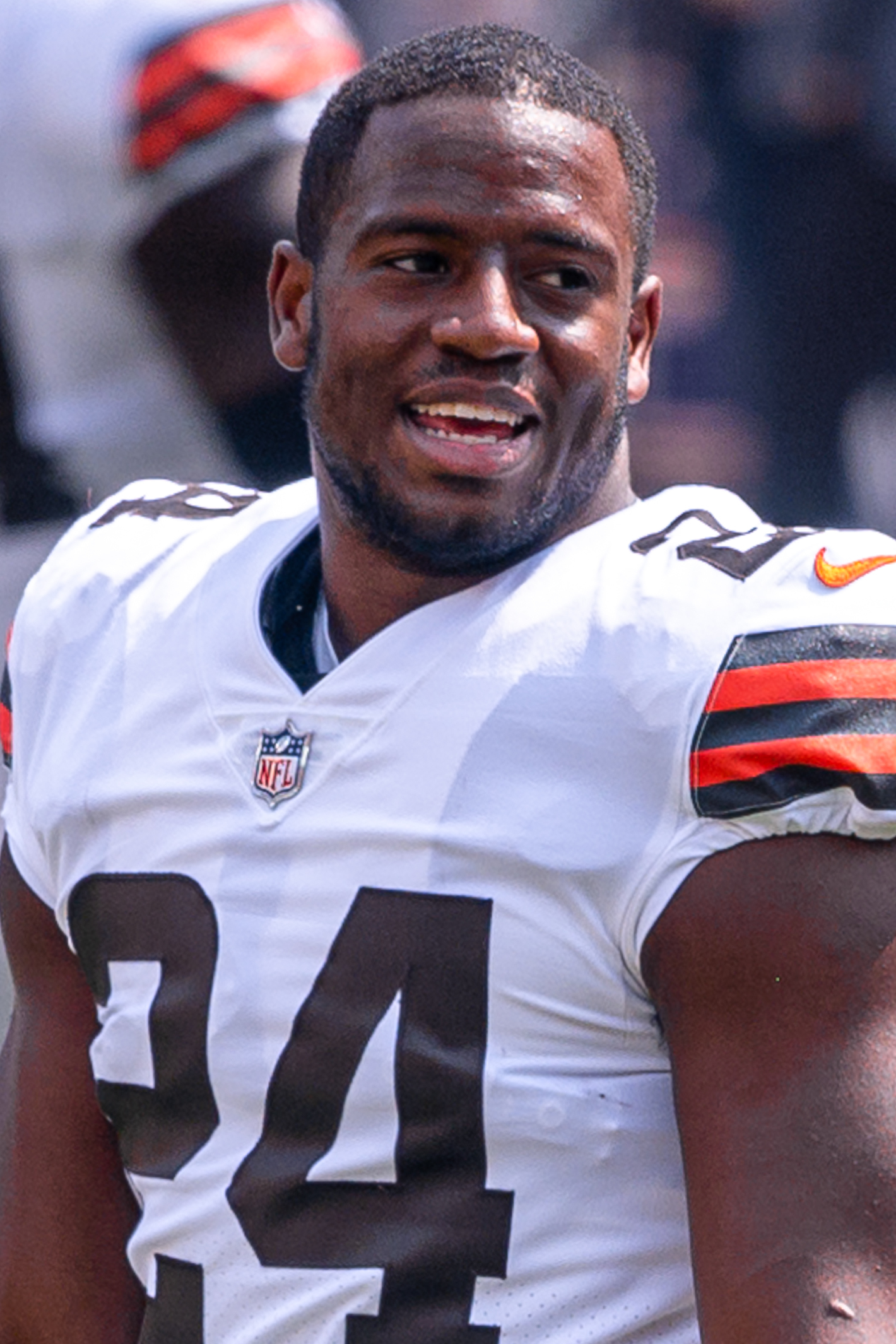
- Chubb with the Cleveland Browns in 2021

No. 24, 21
- Position: Running back

Personal information
- Born: December 27, 1995 (age 30); Cedartown, Georgia, U.S.
- Listed height: 5 ft 11 in (1.80 m)
- Listed weight: 227 lb (103 kg)

Career information
- High school: Cedartown
- College: Georgia (2014–2017)
- NFL draft: 2018: 2nd round, 35th overall pick

Career history
- Cleveland Browns (2018–2024); Houston Texans (2025)

Awards and highlights
- Second-team All-Pro (2022); 4× Pro Bowl (2019–2022); First-team All-SEC (2014); Second-team All-SEC (2017); SEC Freshman of the Year (2014)

Career NFL statistics
- Rushing yards: 7,349
- Rushing average: 5
- Rushing touchdowns: 54
- Receptions: 141
- Receiving yards: 1,109
- Receiving touchdowns: 5
- Stats at Pro Football Reference

Nicholas Jamaal Chubb (born December 27, 1995) is an American former professional football running back who played eight seasons in the National Football League (NFL), primarily for the Cleveland Browns. He played college football for the Georgia Bulldogs and was selected by the Browns in the second round of the 2018 NFL draft. Across his seven seasons in Cleveland, Chubb was a four-time Pro Bowler and a second-team All-Pro in 2022. He spent his final season with the Houston Texans.

== Early life ==
Chubb attended Cedartown High School in Cedartown, Georgia, where he was a two-sport star for the Bulldogs' football and track teams. In football, Chubb led the state of Georgia in rushing yards with 2,721 with 38 touchdowns as a junior. As a senior, he had 2,690 yards and 41 touchdowns. Chubb finished his high school career with 6,983 rushing yards and 102 rushing touchdowns.

As a standout track & field athlete in high school, Chubb competed in events ranging from the 100-meters to the shot put. At the 2013 4A Sectionals, he took fifth place in the long jump event with a leap of 6.85 meters (22 ft, 4 in). At the 2014 4A Sectionals, Chubb won the shot put event, recording a top-throw of 17.05 meters (55 ft, 8in), and earned second-place finishes in both the 100-meter dash, with a time of 10.69 seconds (setting a school record) and the 200-meter dash, with a time of 21.83 seconds. He captured the state title in the shot put at the 2014 Class AAAA with a throw of 16.77 meters (55 ft).

Chubb was ranked by both Rivals.com and Scout.com as a four-star recruit. In June 2013, he committed to the University of Georgia to play college football under head coach Mark Richt.

== College career ==
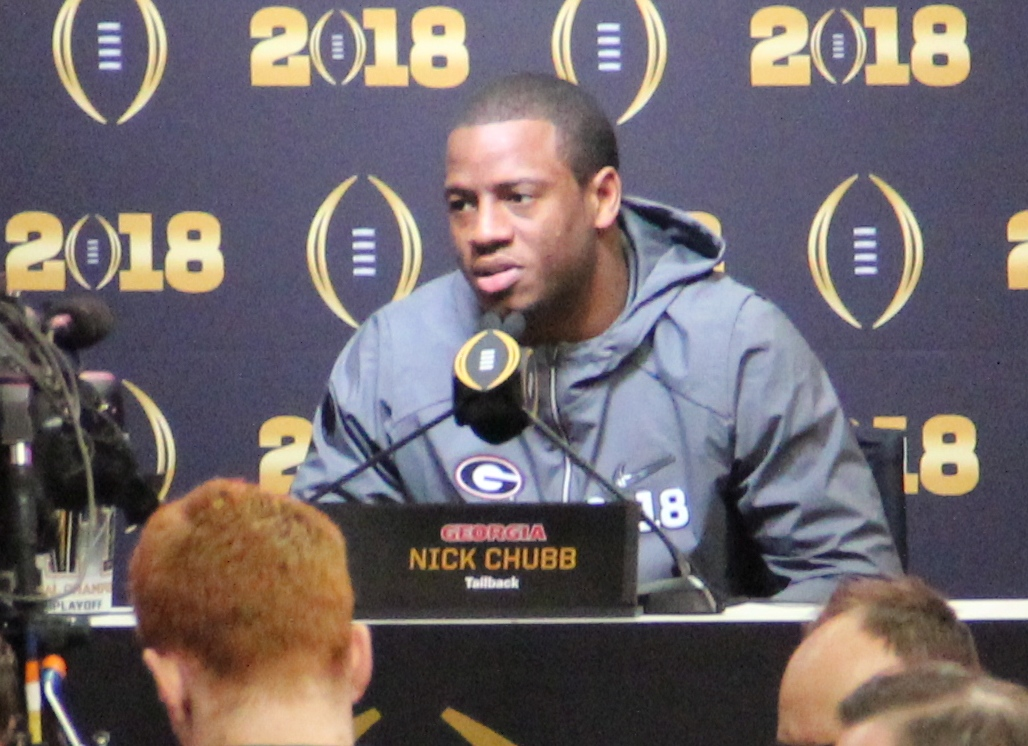
Chubb in 2018

Chubb entered his true freshman season as a backup to starter and future NFL running back Todd Gurley. After Gurley was suspended, Chubb took over as the starter. In his first start, Chubb rushed for 143 yards on 38 carries at Missouri. The next game, he rushed for 202 yards and two touchdowns on 30 carries against Arkansas. In the 2014 Belk Bowl against Louisville, Chubb broke the bowl game record with 266 rushing yards and was named the Belk Bowl MVP. He finished his freshman season with 1,547 rushing yards, good for second in the SEC, despite starting just eight games.

At the Alabama game on October 3, 2015, Chubb tied Herschel Walker's record of 13 consecutive 100-yard games. However, on October 10, 2015, Chubb suffered a "grotesque" knee injury against Tennessee, preventing him from surpassing the record. Due to that injury, he missed the rest of the 2015 season but returned for the 2016 season under new head coach Kirby Smart.

Chubb returned in the Chick-fil-A Kickoff Game, rushing for 222 yards and two touchdowns in a victory over #22 North Carolina. After two modest performances in narrow victories, Chubb sprained his ankle against Ole Miss and was used sparingly over the next five games. Georgia went 1–4 in that period, the sole victory coming over South Carolina behind Chubb's 121 yards and two touchdowns (along with Sony Michel's 133 yards). Chubb split carries with Michel for the remaining four games of the regular season, but had 100+ yards in two, and ended the season with 142 yards and a game-sealing touchdown over TCU in the Liberty Bowl. He also passed former backfield partner Todd Gurley for second all-time in school rush yards. Chubb also passed Kevin Faulk and Darren McFadden to become second in all-time SEC rushing yards, trailing only fellow bulldog Herschel Walker—who was voted the greatest college football player of all time by FBS coaches—in this category.

It was thought that Chubb would enter the 2017 NFL draft, but he decided to return in 2017 for his senior season with the Bulldogs. As a senior, Chubb split carries with Sony Michel, but still managed to amass 1,345 yards on 223 carries (6.0 average) with 15 touchdowns. The two led Georgia to a 12–1 record and an SEC title. In a double-overtime victory over Oklahoma in the Rose Bowl during the College Football Playoff semifinal, Chubb had 145 yards on 14 carries, including a 50-yard touchdown just after halftime and a game-tying two-yard run in the last minute of regulation. (Previously that season, Chubb eclipsed 125 yards and two touchdowns three other times: against Samford, Vanderbilt, and Kentucky.) In the national championship game, Alabama's suffocating defense held Chubb to just 25 yards on 18 carries during the 26–23 overtime loss.

== Professional career ==
Pre-draft measurables
Height	Weight	Arm length	Hand span	Wingspan	40-yard dash	10-yard split	20-yard split	20-yard shuttle	Three-cone drill	Vertical jump	Broad jump	Bench press
5 ft 10 7/8 in (1.80 m)	227 lb (103 kg)	32 in (0.81 m)	9 5/8 in (0.24 m)	6 ft 1 5/8 in (1.87 m)	4.52 s	1.56 s	2.67 s	4.25 s	7.09 s	38.5 in (0.98 m)	10 ft 8 in (3.25 m)	29 reps
All values from NFL Combine

=== Cleveland Browns ===
==== 2018 season ====
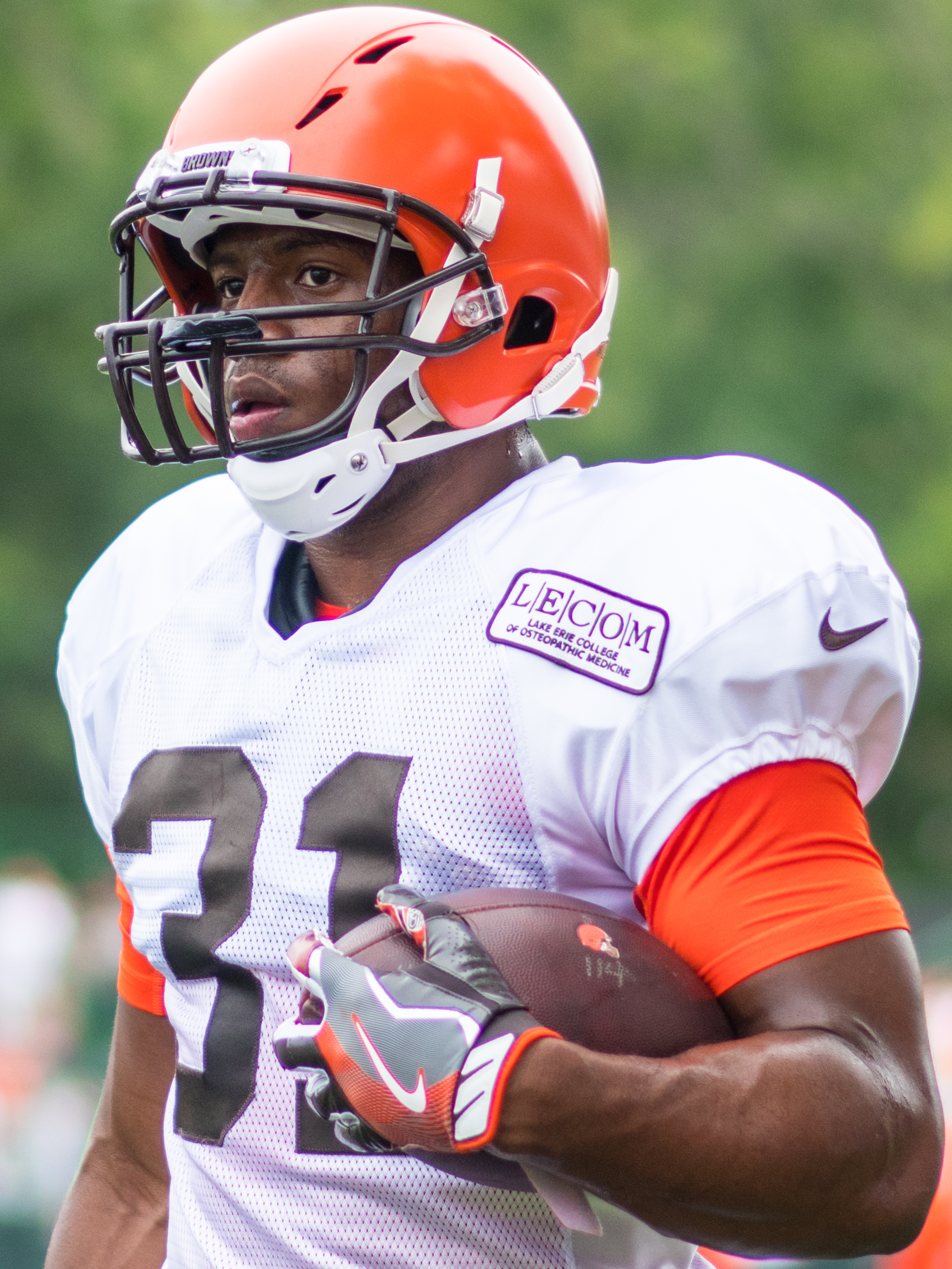
Chubb at training camp in 2018

Chubb was selected by the Cleveland Browns in the second round (35th overall) of the 2018 NFL draft. He was the fourth running back to be selected that year. On June 4, 2018, Chubb signed a four-year rookie deal worth about $7.4 million. The contract included a $3.4 million signing bonus.

Playing behind veterans Carlos Hyde and Duke Johnson, Chubb made his NFL debut during the season-opening 21–21 tie with the Pittsburgh Steelers where he had three carries for 21 yards. With just four carries for 20 yards in the next two games, Chubb made the most of his three carries in a Week 4 45–42 overtime loss to the Oakland Raiders with touchdowns of 63 and 41 yards. Chubb was the fourth player in NFL history to break 100 rushing yards on three or fewer carries.

On October 19, after the Browns traded Carlos Hyde to the Jacksonville Jaguars, Chubb was named the full-time starter. On November 11, Chubb broke off a 92-yard rushing touchdown to help the Browns secure a 28–16 victory over the Atlanta Falcons. Chubb's run was the longest rushing touchdown in Browns franchise history. He finished the game with 20 carries for 176 yards and the aforementioned touchdown to go along with three receptions for 33 yards and the first receiving touchdown of his career.

Chubb finished his rookie year with 192 carries for 996 yards and eight touchdowns (third among rookies in both categories to Saquon Barkley and Phillip Lindsay) to along with 20 receptions for 149 yards and two touchdowns in 16 games and nine starts.

==== 2019 season ====
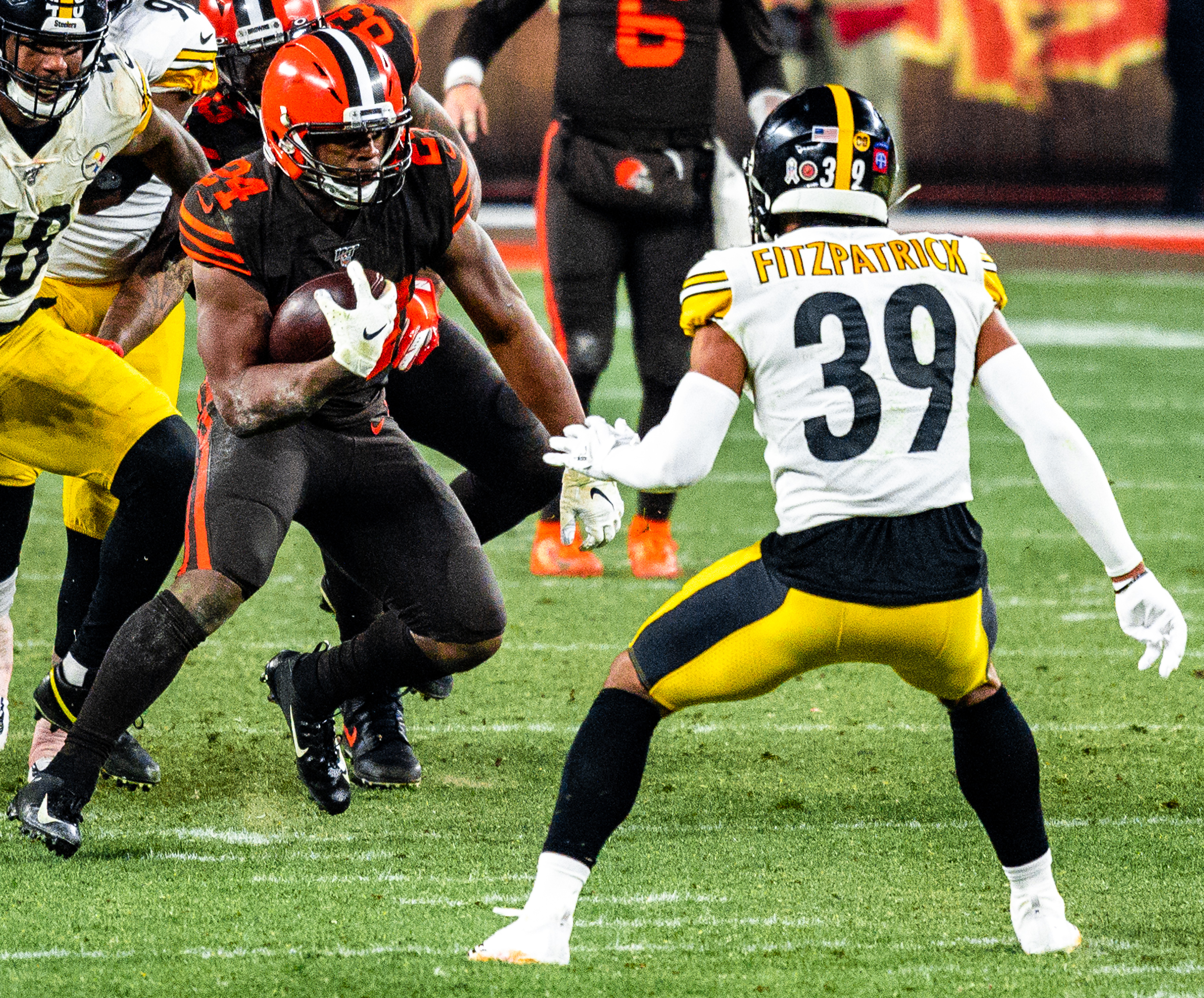
Chubb playing against the Pittsburgh Steelers in 2019

During Week 2 against the New York Jets, Chubb rushed 18 times for 62 yards and his first rushing touchdown of the season in the 23–3 victory. Two weeks later against the Baltimore Ravens, he had for 165 rushing yards and a career high three touchdowns in the 40–25 victory. Chubb was named AFC Offensive Player Of The Week for his performance. During Week 6 against the Seattle Seahawks, he recorded 20 carries for 122 yards and two touchdowns in the 32–28 loss, moving to second in the league in rushing. Following a Week 7 bye, Chubb had 131 yards but two lost fumbles in a 27–13 loss to the New England Patriots. During Week 12 against the Miami Dolphins, he rushed 21 times for 106 yards and a touchdown and caught three passes for 58 yards in the 41–24 victory. Chubb's 92 rushing yards against the Steelers in Week 11 were enough to move him past Christian McCaffrey for the league lead. During Week 14, Chubb had his sixth 100-yard game with 106 yards (99 of them in the second half) in the 27–19 win over the Cincinnati Bengals. In the next game against the Arizona Cardinals, he finished with 127 rushing yards and a 33-yard touchdown during the 38–24 loss. Chubb earned his first Pro Bowl nomination for his 2019 season.

Chubb finished his second professional season with 298 carries for 1,494 yards and eight touchdowns to go along with 36 receptions for 278 yards in 16 games and starts. His 1,494 rushing yards were the second-highest behind Derrick Henry, who rushed for 1,540 yards. Chubb was ranked 36th by his fellow players on the NFL Top 100 Players of 2020.

==== 2020 season ====
During Week 2 against the Bengals, Chubb recorded 22 carries for 124 yards and two touchdowns in the 35–30 victory on Thursday Night Football. In the next game against the Washington Football Team, Chubb finished with 108 rushing yards and two touchdowns during the 34–20 victory. The following week against the Dallas Cowboys, Chubb suffered an MCL injury. The Browns placed him on injured reserve on October 5, 2020.

Chubb was activated from injured reserve on November 14, 2020. During Week 10 against the Houston Texans, in his first game back from injury, Chubb recorded 19 carries for 126 yards and a touchdown, and sealed the win for the Browns with a 59-yard run late in the fourth quarter. In the next game against the Philadelphia Eagles, Chubb had 20 carries for 114 yards during the 22–17 victory. The following week against the Jacksonville Jaguars, he rushed 19 times for 144 yards and a touchdown in the narrow 27–25 victory.

During Week 14 against the Ravens, Chubb had 17 carries for 82 yards and two touchdowns in the 47–42 loss on Monday Night Football. Three weeks later, he eclipsed 1,000 yards for the season and became the first Browns running back to run for a touchdown of 40 yards or more against the Steelers since Jim Brown in 1958. Chubb earned a second Pro Bowl nomination for his performance in the 2020 season.

Chubb finished the 2020 season with 190 carries for 1,067 yards and 12 touchdowns to go along with 16 receptions for 150 yards in 12 games and starts.

During the Wild Card Round against the Steelers, Chubb rushed for 145 yards on 22 carries, including a 40-yard touchdown reception in the fourth quarter that broke the game open and stopped any chances of a Steelers comeback. The Browns would go on to win on the road 48–37. He was ranked 26th by his fellow players on the NFL Top 100 Players of 2021.

==== 2021 season ====
On July 31, 2021, Chubb signed a three-year, $36.6 million contract extension with the Browns.

Chubb scored two touchdowns in the Browns' season-opening loss to the Kansas City Chiefs. During Week 5, against the Los Angeles Chargers, he recorded 21 carries for 161 yards and a touchdown in the 47–42 loss. After missing two games, Chubb had 14 carries for 137 rushing yards and two touchdowns in a 41–16 victory over the Bengals. However, he tested positive for COVID-19 and was out the following game against the Patriots. Chubb returned the following week and had 22 carries for 130 yards in a 13–10 victory over the Detroit Lions. During Week 16 against the Green Bay Packers, he had 184 scrimmage yards in the narrow 24–22 loss.

Chubb was one of five Cleveland Browns players selected to the Pro Bowl. He finished the 2021 season with 228 carries for 1,259 yards and eight touchdowns to go along with 20 receptions for 174 yards and a touchdown in 14 games and starts. Chubb finished second in the NFL in rushing yards. He was ranked 33rd by his fellow players on the NFL Top 100 Players of 2022.

==== 2022 season ====
Chubb started the 2022 season strong with 22 carries for 141 rushing yards in a narrow 26–24 victory over the Carolina Panthers. The following week, he had three rushing touchdowns in a narrow 31–30 loss to the Jets. Chubb scored a late touchdown to give the Browns a 13-point lead, but a series of miscues by the Browns led to the eventual comeback by the Jets. The following week against the Steelers, Chubb had 23 carries for 113 yards and a touchdown in the 29–17 victory.

During Week 4 against the Falcons, Chubb rushed 19 times for 118 yards and a touchdown in the 23–20 loss. In the next game against the Chargers, he recorded 17 carries for 134 yards and two touchdowns during the narrow 30–28 loss. Three weeks later against the Bengals, he had 23 carries for 101 yards and two touchdowns in the 32–13 victory.

During Week 12 against the Tampa Bay Buccaneers, Chubb had 26 carries for 116 yards and a touchdown in the 23–17 overtime victory. He finished the 2022 season with 302 carries for 1,525 yards and 12 touchdowns to go along with 27 receptions for 239 yards and a touchdown in 17 games and starts. Chubb was also named to the Pro Bowl.

==== 2023 season ====
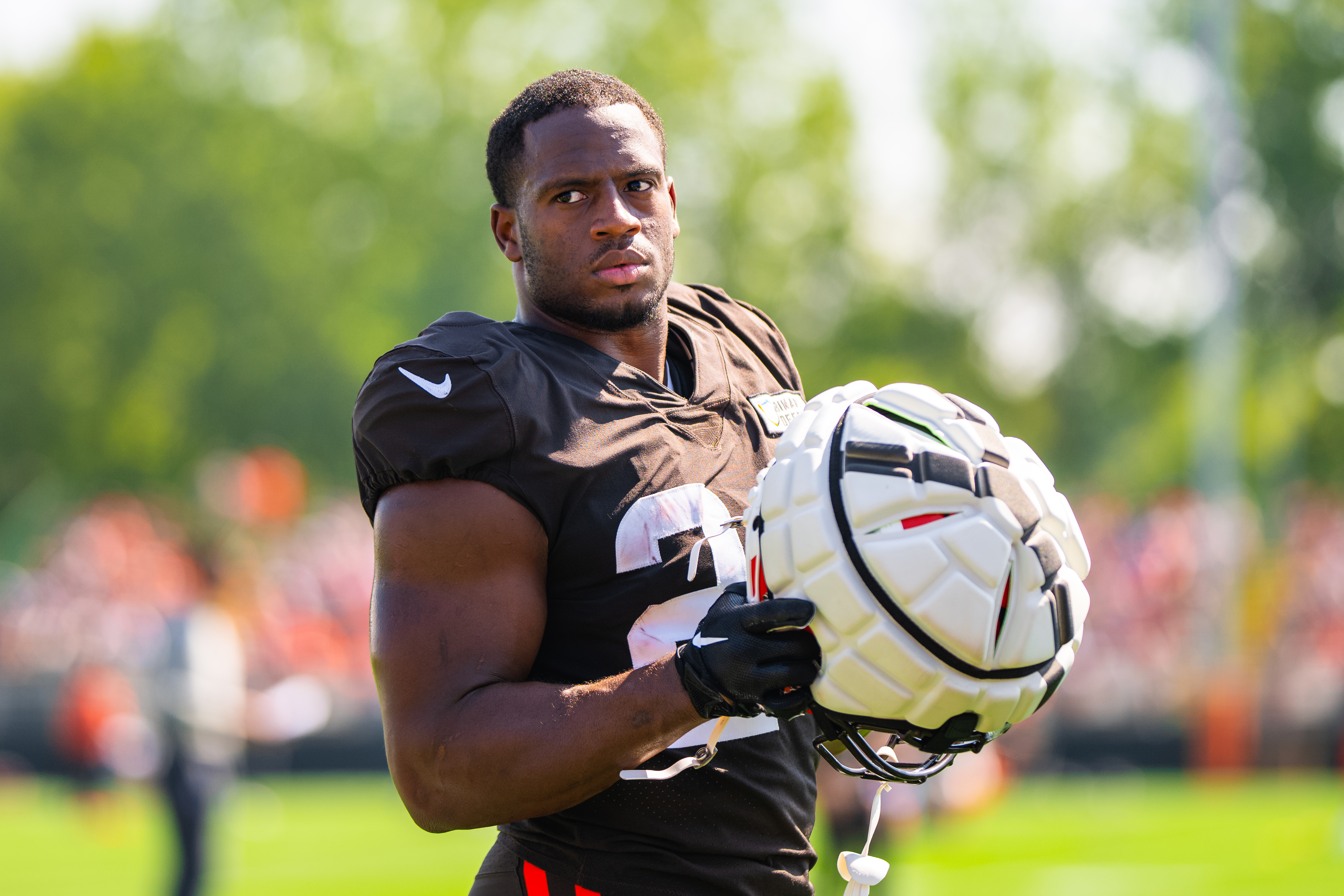
Chubb at training camp in 2023

During Week 2 against the Steelers, Chubb suffered a serious injury to the same knee he injured in 2015. Chubb was carted off the field and ruled out for the remainder of the game. Following the game, head coach Kevin Stefanski announced that Chubb would miss the remainder of the season. He was placed on injured reserve two days later. Chubb was later diagnosed with a torn MCL and a damaged ACL.

==== 2024 season ====
Chubb began the 2024 season on the reserve/physically unable to perform (PUP) list, keeping him out for at least the first four games.

Following Week 4, Chubb was designated for return to practice on October 2, opening his 21-day window to be activated to the active roster. He was activated prior to Week 7. On October 20, Chubb made his season debut at home against the Bengals and scored a rushing touchdown in his first game in 398 days. Against the Steelers in Week 12, Chubb rushed for 59 yards and two touchdowns, including the go-ahead touchdown with under a minute left as the Browns won 24–19. During a Week 15 21–7 loss to the Kansas City Chiefs, Chubb exited the game with a broken foot in the third quarter, ending his season.

Chubb finished the 2024 season with 102 carries for 332 yards and three touchdowns to go along with five receptions for 31 yards and a touchdown in eight games and starts.

Chubb became a free agent following the season, finishing his Browns tenure ranked third in franchise history in rushing yards with 6,843, trailing only Jim Brown (12,312) and Leroy Kelly (7,274).

=== Houston Texans ===
On June 9, 2025, Chubb signed a one-year $2.5 million contract with the Houston Texans, with a max value of $5 million. He finished the season with 122 carries for 506 yards and three touchdowns to go along with 13 receptions for 67 yards in 15 games (including nine starts).

On August 21, 2026, Chubb announced his retirement from the NFL. On September 25, 2026, he signed a one-day contract with the Cleveland Browns to retire as a Brown.

== Career statistics ==
=== NFL ===
==== Regular season ====
General				Rushing					Receiving					Fumbles	
Year	Team	GP	GS	Att	Yds	Avg	Lng	TD	Rec	Yds	Avg	Lng	TD	Fum	Lost
2018	CLE	16	9	192	996	5.2	92	8	20	149	7.5	24	2	0	0
2019	CLE	16	16	298	1,494	5.0	88	8	36	278	7.7	32	0	3	3
2020	CLE	12	12	190	1,067	5.6	59	12	16	150	9.4	26	0	1	1
2021	CLE	14	14	228	1,259	5.5	70	8	20	174	8.7	40	1	2	1
2022	CLE	17	17	302	1,525	5.0	41	12	27	239	8.9	26	1	1	1
2023	CLE	2	2	28	170	6.1	20	0	4	21	5.3	10	0	0	0
2024	CLE	8	8	102	332	3.3	19	3	5	31	6.2	19	1	1	1
2025	HOU	15	9	122	506	4.1	30	3	13	67	5.2	27	0	0	0
Career		100	87	1,462	7,349	5.0	92	54	141	1,109	7.9	40	5	8	7

==== Postseason ====
General				Rushing					Receiving					Fumbles	
Year	Team	GP	GS	Att	Yds	Avg	Lng	TD	Rec	Yds	Avg	Lng	TD	Fum	Lost
2020	CLE	2	2	31	145	4.7	23	0	6	73	12.2	40	1	0	0
2023	CLE	0	0	Did not play due to injury											
2025	HOU	2	0	14	62	4.4	9	0	0	0	0.0	0	0	0	0
Career		4	2	45	207	4.6	23	0	6	73	12.2	40	1	0	0

=== College ===
Season	Team	Games		Rushing					Receiving				
Season	Team	GP	GS	Att	Yds	Avg	Lng	TD	Rec	Yds	Avg	Lng	TD
2014	Georgia	13	8	219	1,547	7.1	83	14	18	213	11.8	27	2
2015	Georgia	6	6	92	747	8.1	83	7	4	32	8.0	24	1
2016	Georgia	13	11	224	1,130	5.0	55	8	5	86	17.2	49	1
2017	Georgia	15	15	223	1,345	6.0	55	15	4	30	7.5	11	0
Career		47	40	758	4,769	6.3	83	44	31	361	11.6	49	4

== Personal life ==
Chubb is named for his great-grandfather, descended from one of eight brothers who founded Chubbtown, Georgia, a settlement of free blacks, in Floyd County, which endured through the American Civil War. His older brothers, Henry and Zach, played cornerback for Troy University and defensive back for Air Force, respectively. Chubb's father, Henry, played at Valdosta State, and his uncle, Aaron, was a linebacker for Georgia.

Chubb's cousin, Bradley Chubb, plays for the Buffalo Bills, while another cousin, Brandon Chubb, was an undrafted free-agent signing who has been on multiple NFL rosters.

In 2021, Chubb released a new breakfast cereal, Chubb Crunch, with proceeds to benefit his First Candle charity which raises awareness for Sudden Infant Death Syndrome.
