= Cedartown High School =

Public high school in Cedartown, Georgia, United States

Location
- 167 Frank Lott Drive; Cedartown, Polk County, Georgia 30125; United States

Information
- School type: Public school, high school
- Established: 1887
- School district: Polk County School District, Georgia
- NCES District ID: 1304200
- NCES School ID: 130420001510
- Principal: Scott Wilson
- Staff: 70.00 (on an FTE basis)
- Grades: 9–12
- Enrollment: 1,521 (2024–2025)
- Student to teacher ratio: 21.73
- Campus type: Suburban
- Colors: Red and black
- Fight song: Glory, Glory
- Athletics conference: Georgia High School Association
- Mascot: Bulldog
- Nickname: The Cedartown Bulldogs
- Rival: Rockmart High School
- Accreditation: Southern Association of Colleges and Schools
- Website: School website

Cedartown High School (also known as the Cedartown Bulldogs or CHS) is the only high school in Cedartown, Georgia, United States. As of the 2024-2025 school year, it had an enrollment of 1,521 students and 70 classroom teachers (on an FTE basis), for a student-teacher ratio of 21.73.

== History ==
Cedartown High School was founded in 1887. In 1903, it created a football team with the mascot "The Cedartown Bulldogs." By the 1930s the school was rebuilt in a new location in order to serve the growing teenage population of the town. Vocational or "elective" classes were added in the 1930s and a school band in 1941. In 1970, the school was rebuilt at another location in the town.

Cedartown High School enrolls around 1500 students per year. It still goes by the mascot of the bulldog, symbolizing strength and endurance. The school colors are still red and black.

"Toland's Bulldog Pride," Cedartown High School's mascot, died Monday, Jan. 2, 2012, following a brief illness. Pride was bought as a puppy from Mars Hill Bulldogs by the CHS Student Council and attended school each day. His affectionate and retiring personality made him a favorite member of the high school population as well as the community at large. A brief memorial service was held Wednesday, Jan. 4, at the home of Mr. and Mrs. Mike Hogg, where Pride lived. Those attending were Hal David, Robyn Teems, Barry Williams, Clint Jones, Scott Hendrix and son Landon, Cindy Brooks, Alyson Reaves, Elisabeth and Chloe Powell, Kriss York, Dana Johnson, Jeff Ford, Scott McAnich, and Allie Hogg. Todd Tillery and CHS Skills USA also participated in the memorial.

In 2012, the History Press released a book that was written by William Austin that contained a chronological history of the Cedartown football team. The popular publication also included highlights of the cross-town African American high school Cedar Hill Panthers, which won four state championships in ten years of competition.

== Alma Mater ==
In the hearts of Cedartown Students
Love shall never lack,
Nor our loyal admiration,
For the red and black.

May the black of our dear colors,
Stand for serious aims,
While the crimson mingled with it,
Courage strong proclaims

To your lofty pure ideals,
We shall always cling,
And our heart's sincere devotion,
We shall always bring

Hail to thee our Alma Mater,
Let us pledge anew,
Faithful, loyal, willing service,
Cedartown, to you!

== Notable alumni ==
- Ray Beck (1931-2007) Former All-American OG with the Georgia Tech Yellow Jackets and NFL Player with the NY Giants (52, 55-57). Ray was inducted into the College Football Hall of Fame in 1997.
- Edgar Chandler (1946-1992) Former 2 time All-American LB at The University of Georgia (66, 67) and played in the NFL with the Buffalo Bills (68-72), New England Patriots (73). He was inducted into the Georgia Sports Hall of Fame in 1988.
- Nick Chubb (born 1995) (Class of 2014) is a former star RB with The University of Georgia and was a consensus 5* recruit coming out of high school. Nick currently plays in the NFL for the Houston Texans.
- Betty Reynolds Cobb (1884-1956) was an attorney, author, and activist. She was one of the first women accepted to the bar, and one of the first female lawyers in Georgia. She was also an early member of the League of Women Voters.
- Phil Douglas (1890-1952) was an American professional baseball player from 1912-1922. He won the World Series in 1921 with the New York Giants and led the league in ERA in 1922.
- Zah Frazier (born 2000) (Class of 2019) is an NFL football cornerback for the Chicago Bears.
- Agnes Ellen Harris (1883-1952) was an American educator. She was one of the earliest practitioners of the field of Domestic Science and taught nutrition and health to women for fifty years. She was also a charter member of the American Home Economics Association and served as a national officer in the 1920s. Agnes was inducted into the Alabama Women's Hall of Fame in 1972.
- Seale Harris (1870-1957) was an American physician and researcher. He was nicknamed "the Benjamin Franklin of Medicine" by contemporaries for his leadership and writing on a wide range of medical and political topics. Dr. Harris' most celebrated accomplishments were his 1924 hypothesis of hyperinsulinism as a cause of spontaneous hypoglycemia. He was elected to the Alabama Hall of Fame posthumously in 1965.
- Sterling Holloway (1905-1992) was an American character actor and voice actor who appeared in over 100 films and 40 television shows. He was also a voice actor for The Walt Disney Company, well known for his distinctive tenor voice, and served as the original voice of the title character in Walt Disney's Winnie the Pooh.
- Sam Hunt (born 1984) (Class of 2003) is an American singer and songwriter. Sam won the Taste of Country Music Awards, American Music Awards, and ASCAP Country Music Awards "New Artist of the Year" in 2015. He won the CMT Music Award for "Breakthrough Video of the Year" (Leave the Light On) in 2015. He also won American Country Countdown Awards "Breakthrough Artist of the Year" and "Digital Album of the Year" in 2016. In 2018 Sam received the "Gene Weed Milestone Award" from the Academy of Country Music.
- Doug Sanders (1933-2020) is a retired American professional golfer who won 20 events on the PGA Tour and had four runner-up finishes at major championships.
- Jason Wilkes (born 1984) (Class of 2003) Known most commonly by the name "Wilkes". He is an American singer and songwriter and he recently competed on the hit TV show "The Voice".
- Whit Wyatt (1907-1999) was a former Major League Baseball pitcher from 1929-1945.
