= Etna Mountain =

Summit in Georgia, US

Coordinates: 34°00′52″N 85°24′00″W

Etna Mountain is a summit in the U.S. state of Georgia. The elevation is 1,224 feet (373 m).

Etna Mountain was named after Mount Etna, on Sicily.
