= North Georgia Annual Conference =

The North Georgia Conference is a regional episcopal area, (similar to a diocese) of the United Methodist Church. (Not to be confused with the "Annual Conference" which is the yearly meeting of the North Georgia Conference itself.) This conference serves the northern half of the state of Georgia, with its administrative offices and the office of the bishop located in Atlanta, GA. It is part of the Southeastern Jurisdictional Conference. The bishop is Robin Dease.

== Bishops ==
- 1996 - 2008: Bishop G. Lindsey Davis
- 2008 - 2016: Bishop B. Michael Watson
- 2016 - 2022 Sue Haupert-Johnson [Bishop Sue Haupert-Johnson]
- 2023 - Current Robin Dease

Bishop Robin Dease began service on January 1, 2023.

== Districts ==
The North Georgia Annual Conference is further subdivided into 5 smaller regions, called "districts," which provide further administrative functions for the operation of local churches in cooperation with each other. This structure is vital to Methodism, and is referred to as connectionalism. The Districts that comprise the North Georgia Conference are:

- (1) North East
- (2) North West
- (3) South Central
- (4) South East
- (5) South West

== See also ==
- Annual Conferences of the United Methodist Church
