= Aragon, Georgia =

The City of Aragon
- City
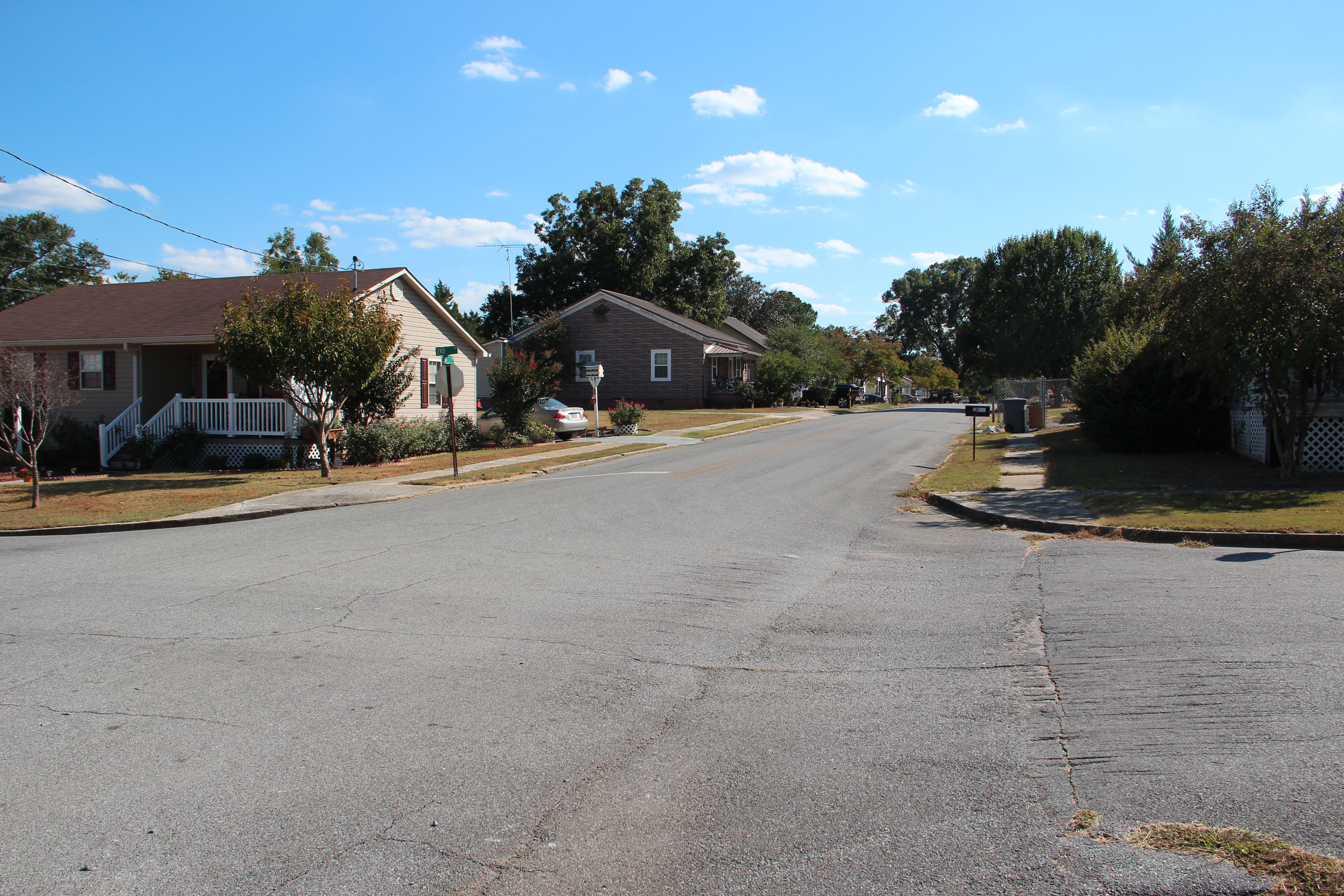
- Street in Aragon

- Flag Seal

- Location in Polk County and the state of Georgia
- Coordinates: 34°2′43″N 85°3′27″W
- Country: United States
- State: Georgia
- County: Polk
- Established: December 1899

Government
  - Type: Mayor-Council
  - Mayor: Judd Fee
  - Mayor Pro Tem: Donnie Canada
  - Council Member: Dickie Gazaway
  - Council Member: Stephan Sanders
  - Council Member: Ed Streetman

Area
  - Total: 1.11 sq mi (2.87 km^{2})
  - Land: 1.09 sq mi (2.82 km^{2})
  - Water: 0.019 sq mi (0.05 km^{2})
- Elevation: 741 ft (226 m)

Population (2020)
  - Total: 1,440
  - Density: 1,323.4/sq mi (510.97/km^{2})
- Time zone: UTC-5 (Eastern (EST))
  - Summer (DST): UTC-4 (EDT)
- ZIP code: 30104
- Area codes: 770/678/470
- FIPS code: 13-02592
- GNIS feature ID: 0354383
- Website: https://www.cityofaragon.com/

Aragon is a city in Polk County, Georgia, United States. As of the 2020 census, the city had a population of 1,440.

== History ==
A post office has been in operation in Aragon since 1899. The city was named for local deposits of the mineral aragonite. Aragon incorporated in 1914.

The city was home to the Aragon mill, which is now closed and abandoned.

An EF3 tornado struck the northern part of the city on March 15, 2008, killing two people.

== Geography ==
Aragon is located at 34°2′43″N 85°3′27″W (34.045252, -85.057384).

According to the United States Census Bureau, the city has a total area of 2.82 square miles (7.3 km^{2}), all land.

== Demographics ==
Historical population
Census	Pop.	Note	%±
1950	1,272		—
1960	1,023		−19.6%
1980	855		—
1990	899		5.1%
2000	1,039		15.6%
2010	1,249		20.2%
2020	1,440		15.3%
U.S. Decennial Census; 1850-1870 1870-1880; 1890-1910 1920-1930; 1940 1950 1960; 1970 1980 1990; 2000 2010 2020

Aragon appeared as an unincorporated community in the 1950 U.S. census and the 1960 U.S. census. It was not listed in the 1970 U.S. census. In the 1980 United States census, it was listed as a city.

=== Racial and ethnic composition ===
Aragon, Georgia – racial and ethnic composition Note: the US Census treats Hispanic/Latino as an ethnic category. This table excludes Latinos from the racial categories and assigns them to a separate category. Hispanics/Latinos may be of any race.
Race / ethnicity (NH = Non-Hispanic)	Pop 2000	Pop 2010	Pop 2020	% 2000	% 2010	2020
White alone (NH)	1,003	1,076	1,148	96.54%	86.15%	79.72%
Black or African American alone (NH)	7	69	137	0.67%	5.52%	9.51%
Native American or Alaska Native alone (NH)	4	2	3	0.38%	0.16%	0.21%
Asian alone (NH)	1	7	7	0.10%	0.56%	0.49%
Pacific Islander alone (NH)	0	0	0	0.00%	0.00%	0.00%
Some Other Race alone (NH)	0	3	2	0.00%	0.24%	0.14%
Mixed-race or multi-racial (NH)	6	29	79	0.58%	2.32%	5.49%
Hispanic or Latino (any race)	18	63	64	1.73%	5.04%	4.44%
Total	1,039	1,249	1,440	100.00%	100.00%	100.00%

=== 2020 census ===
As of the 2020 census, Aragon had a population of 1,440 and 357 families. The median age was 34.5 years. 26.5% of residents were under the age of 18 and 13.6% of residents were 65 years of age or older. For every 100 females there were 89.5 males, and for every 100 females age 18 and over there were 89.1 males age 18 and over.

87.7% of residents lived in urban areas, while 12.3% lived in rural areas.

There were 538 households in Aragon, of which 39.6% had children under the age of 18 living in them. Of all households, 47.6% were married-couple households, 18.2% were households with a male householder and no spouse or partner present, and 27.7% were households with a female householder and no spouse or partner present. About 22.3% of all households were made up of individuals and 8.8% had someone living alone who was 65 years of age or older.

There were 566 housing units, of which 4.9% were vacant. The homeowner vacancy rate was 1.5% and the rental vacancy rate was 2.7%.

=== 2010 census ===
As of the census of 2010 thru 2017, there were 1,252 people, 399 households, and 284 families residing in the city. The population density was 1150.15 people/mi^{2}(444.07 people/km^{2}). There were 474 housing units at an average density of 393.9 per square mile (152.1/km^{2}). The racial makeup of the city was 97.21% White, 0.67% African American, 0.87% Native American, 0.10% Asian, 0.38% from other races, and 0.77% from two or more races. Hispanic or Latino people of any race were 1.73% of the population.

There were 399 households, out of which 35.3% had children under the age of 18 living with them, 55.6% were married couples living together, 10.5% had a female householder with no husband present, and 28.6% were non-families. 23.3% of all households were made up of individuals, and 9.3% had someone living alone who was 65 years of age or older. The average household size was 2.60 and the average family size was 3.08.

In the city, the population was spread out, with 27.1% under the age of 18, 11.0% from 18 to 24, 29.1% from 25 to 44, 21.7% from 45 to 64, and 11.2% who were 65 years of age or older. The median age was 34 years. For every 100 females, there were 92.8 males. For every 100 females age 18 and over, there were 92.6 males.

The median income for a household in the city was $31,053, and the median income for a family was $39,167. Males had a median income of $28,250 versus $21,406 for females. The per capita income for the city was $15,084. About 11.0% of families and 17.5% of the population were below the poverty line, including 22.9% of those under age 18 and 11.1% of those age 65 or over.
