= Polk County, Georgia =

County in Georgia, United States

- County
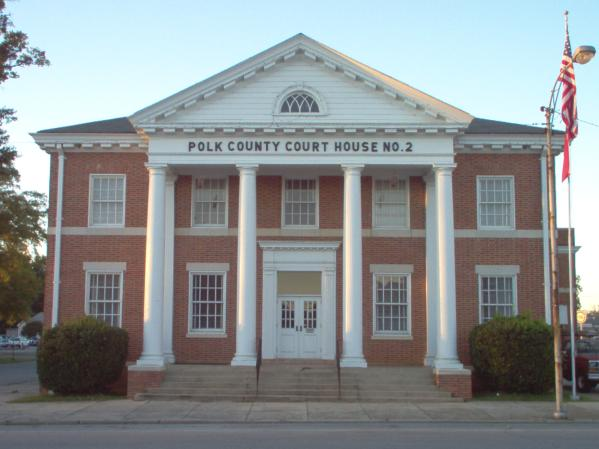
- Polk County Courthouse in Cedartown

- Location within the U.S. state of Georgia
- Coordinates: 34°00′N 85°11′W
- Country: United States
- State: Georgia
- Founded: December 20, 1851; 174 years ago
- Named for: James K. Polk
- Seat: Cedartown
- Largest city: Cedartown

Area
  - Total: 312 sq mi (810 km^{2})
  - Land: 310 sq mi (800 km^{2})
  - Water: 1.8 sq mi (4.7 km^{2}) 0.6%

Population (2020)
  - Total: 42,853
  - Estimate (2025): 45,514 ▲
  - Density: 140/sq mi (53/km^{2})
- Time zone: UTC−5 (Eastern)
  - Summer (DST): UTC−4 (EDT)
- Congressional district: 14th
- Website: www.polkga.org

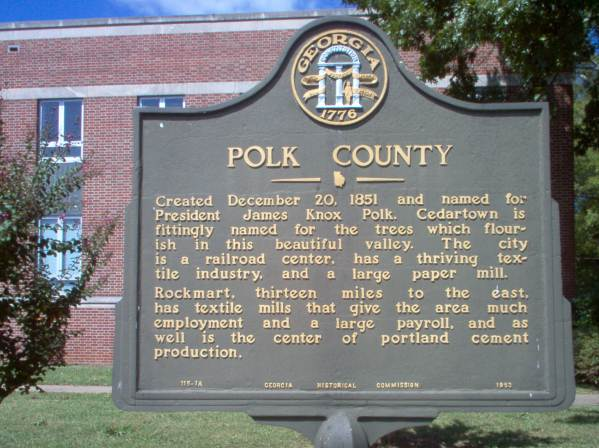
Polk County historical marker

Polk County is a county in the Northwest region of the U.S. state of Georgia. As of the 2020 census, the population was 42,853. The county seat is Cedartown. The county was created on December 20, 1851, by an act of the Georgia General Assembly and named after James K. Polk, the eleventh President of the United States. Polk County comprises the Cedartown, GA Metropolitan Statistical Area.

== Geography ==
According to the U.S. Census Bureau, the county has a total area of 312 square miles (810 km^{2}), of which 310 square miles (800 km^{2}) is land and 1.8 square miles (4.7 km^{2}) (0.6%) is water. Much of the county is also covered in rolling hills and small mountains, most of which are part of the Piedmont Plateau and the Ridge-and-Valley mountains, which are both smaller sections of the larger Appalachian Mountains. The highest of these small mountains is Shorty Mountain near the unincorporated community of Etna with an elevation of 1,610 ft (491 m) above sea level. The most prominent mountain in the county (as well as the fifth-highest) is Signal Mountain in Rockmart with a prominence of 360 ft (110 m) and an elevation of 1,290 ft (393 m) above sea level.

Most of eastern Polk County, centered on Rockmart, is located in the Etowah River sub-basin of the ACT River Basin (Alabama-Coosa-Tallapoosa River Basin), while most of western Polk County, centered on Cedartown, is located in the Upper Coosa River sub-basin of the same ACT River Basin. Small slivers of the southern edges of the county are located in the Upper Tallapoosa River sub-basin of the same larger ACT River Basin.

=== Major highways ===
- U.S. Route 27 / State Route 1
  - U.S. Route 27 Business / State Route 1 Business
- U.S. Route 278 / State Route 6
  - U.S. Route 278 Business / State Route 6 Business
- State Route 100
- State Route 101
- State Route 113

=== Adjacent counties ===
- Floyd County – north
- Bartow County – northeast
- Paulding County – east
- Haralson County – south
- Cleburne County, Alabama – southwest
- Cherokee County, Alabama – west

== Demographics ==
Historical population
Census	Pop.	Note	%±
1860	6,295		—
1870	7,822		24.3%
1880	11,952		52.8%
1890	14,945		25.0%
1900	17,856		19.5%
1910	20,203		13.1%
1920	20,357		0.8%
1930	25,141		23.5%
1940	28,467		13.2%
1950	30,976		8.8%
1960	28,015		−9.6%
1970	29,656		5.9%
1980	32,386		9.2%
1990	33,815		4.4%
2000	38,127		12.8%
2010	41,475		8.8%
2020	42,853		3.3%
2025 (est.)	45,514	▲	6.2%
U.S. Decennial Census; 1790-1880 1890-1910; 1920-1930 1930-1940; 1940-1950 1960-1980; 1980-2000 2010

=== Racial and ethnic composition ===
Polk County, Georgia – racial and ethnic composition Note: the US Census treats Hispanic/Latino as an ethnic category. This table excludes Latinos from the racial categories and assigns them to a separate category. Hispanics/Latinos may be of any race.
Race / ethnicity (NH = Non-Hispanic)	Pop 1980	Pop 1990	Pop 2000	Pop 2010	Pop 2020	% 1980	% 1990	% 2000	% 2010	% 2020
White alone (NH)	27,264	28,413	29,684	30,492	30,161	84.18%	84.02%	77.86%	73.52%	70.38%
Black or African American alone (NH)	4,786	4,772	5,073	5,150	5,119	14.78%	14.11%	13.31%	12.42%	11.95%
Native American or Alaska Native alone (NH)	13	58	68	73	101	0.04%	0.17%	0.18%	0.18%	0.24%
Asian alone (NH)	38	87	118	270	239	0.12%	0.26%	0.31%	0.65%	0.56%
Native Hawaiian or Pacific Islander alone (NH)	x	x	7	16	21	x	x	0.02%	0.04%	0.05%
Other race alone (NH)	11	2	27	53	156	0.03%	0.01%	0.07%	0.13%	0.36%
Mixed-race or multiracial (NH)	x	x	229	536	1,471	x	x	0.60%	1.29%	3.43%
Hispanic or Latino (any race)	274	483	2,921	4,885	5,585	0.85%	1.43%	7.66%	11.78%	13.03%
Total	32,386	33,815	38,127	41,475	42,853	100.00%	100.00%	100.00%	100.00%	100.00%

=== 2020 census ===
As of the 2020 census, there were 42,853 people, 15,999 households, and 10,151 families residing in the county. 48.0% of residents lived in urban areas, while 52.0% lived in rural areas.

The median age was 39.0 years, 24.8% of residents were under the age of 18, and 16.9% were 65 years of age or older; for every 100 females there were 94.7 males, and for every 100 females age 18 and over there were 93.1 males age 18 and over.

The racial makeup of the county was 72.9% White, 12.2% Black or African American, 0.8% American Indian and Alaska Native, 0.6% Asian, 0.1% Native Hawaiian and Pacific Islander, 7.8% from some other race, and 5.7% from two or more races. Hispanic or Latino residents of any race comprised 13.0% of the population.

Of the 15,999 households in the county, 33.6% had children under the age of 18 living with them and 28.4% had a female householder with no spouse or partner present. About 25.8% of all households were made up of individuals and 12.5% had someone living alone who was 65 years of age or older.

There were 17,274 housing units, of which 7.4% were vacant. Among occupied housing units, 65.7% were owner-occupied and 34.3% were renter-occupied. The homeowner vacancy rate was 1.2% and the rental vacancy rate was 6.0%.

=== 2010 census ===
As of the 2010 United States census, there were 41,475 people, 15,092 households, and 10,908 families living in the county. The population density was 133.6 inhabitants per square mile (51.6/km^{2}). There were 16,908 housing units at an average density of 54.5 per square mile (21.0/km^{2}). The racial makeup of the county was 77.1% white, 12.5% black or African American, 0.7% Asian, 0.3% American Indian, 0.1% Pacific islander, 7.5% from other races, and 1.8% from two or more races. Those of Hispanic or Latino origin made up 11.8% of the population. In terms of ancestry, 17.2% were English, 15.2% were American, 13.0% were Irish, and 5.3% were German.

Of the 15,092 households, 38.2% had children under the age of 18 living with them, 51.5% were married couples living together, 14.8% had a female householder with no husband present, 27.7% were non-families, and 23.6% of all households were made up of individuals. The average household size was 2.72 and the average family size was 3.20. The median age was 36.2 years.

The median income for a household in the county was $38,646 and the median income for a family was $43,172. Males had a median income of $37,070 versus $27,758 for females. The per capita income for the county was $18,214. About 15.6% of families and 19.3% of the population were below the poverty line, including 25.4% of those under age 18 and 10.5% of those age 65 or over.

=== 2000 census ===
As of the census of 2000, there were 38,127 people, 14,012 households, and 10,340 families living in the county. The population density was 122 inhabitants per square mile (47/km^{2}). There were 15,059 housing units at an average density of 48 per square mile (19/km^{2}). The racial makeup of the county was 80.52% White, 13.34% Black or African American, 0.22% Native American, 0.31% Asian, 0.04% Pacific Islander, 4.62% from other races, and 0.95% from two or more races. 7.66% of the population were Hispanic or Latino of any race.

There were 14,012 households, out of which 32.90% had children under the age of 18 living with them, 55.90% were married couples living together, 13.10% had a female householder with no husband present, and 26.20% were non-families. 22.70% of all households were made up of individuals, and 10.50% had someone living alone who was 65 years of age or older. The average household size was 2.66 and the average family size was 3.09.

In the county, the population was spread out, with 26.10% under the age of 18, 9.70% from 18 to 24, 28.80% from 25 to 44, 22.30% from 45 to 64, and 13.20% who were 65 years of age or older. The median age was 35 years. For every 100 females, there were 99.20 males. For every 100 women age 18 and over, there were 95.70 men.

The median income for a household in the county was $32,328, and the median income for a family was $37,847. Males had a median income of $29,985 versus $21,452 for females. The per capita income for the county was $15,617. About 11.20% of families and 15.50% of the population were below the poverty line, including 18.70% of those under age 18 and 12.60% of those age 65 or over.

== Recreation ==
- Silver Comet Trail

== Media ==
- Polk County Standard Journal

== Communities ==
=== Cities ===
- Aragon
- Braswell (mainly in Paulding County)
- Cedartown (county seat)
- Rockmart
- Taylorsville (partly in Bartow County)

== Politics ==
As of the 2020s, Polk County is a strongly Republican voting county, voting 80% for Donald Trump in 2024. For elections to the United States House of Representatives, Polk County is part of Georgia's 14th congressional district, currently represented by Clay Fuller. For elections to the Georgia State Senate, Polk County is part of District 31. For elections to the Georgia House of Representatives, Polk County is part of District 16.

United States presidential election results for Polk County, Georgia
Year	Republican		Democratic		Third party(ies)	
Year	No.	%	No.	%	No.	%
1912	36	2.81%	706	55.11%	539	42.08%
1916	0	0.00%	1,172	62.18%	713	37.82%
1920	1,004	60.41%	658	39.59%	0	0.00%
1924	481	33.38%	803	55.73%	157	10.90%
1928	1,462	62.27%	886	37.73%	0	0.00%
1932	211	8.86%	2,170	91.14%	0	0.00%
1936	389	12.36%	2,754	87.51%	4	0.13%
1940	401	12.92%	2,693	86.76%	10	0.32%
1944	463	14.65%	2,698	85.35%	0	0.00%
1948	491	13.25%	2,918	78.74%	297	8.01%
1952	1,299	22.61%	4,447	77.39%	0	0.00%
1956	2,098	31.79%	4,502	68.21%	0	0.00%
1960	1,746	28.64%	4,351	71.36%	0	0.00%
1964	3,282	41.86%	4,555	58.10%	3	0.04%
1968	1,729	21.68%	2,007	25.16%	4,240	53.16%
1972	4,929	78.91%	1,317	21.09%	0	0.00%
1976	1,944	24.12%	6,115	75.88%	0	0.00%
1980	2,949	34.44%	5,421	63.31%	192	2.24%
1984	5,435	62.49%	3,262	37.51%	0	0.00%
1988	5,454	64.46%	2,977	35.18%	30	0.35%
1992	4,158	38.98%	4,872	45.67%	1,638	15.35%
1996	4,130	43.25%	4,298	45.01%	1,122	11.75%
2000	5,841	57.74%	4,112	40.65%	163	1.61%
2004	8,467	68.17%	3,868	31.14%	85	0.68%
2008	9,850	69.60%	4,052	28.63%	251	1.77%
2012	9,811	71.89%	3,615	26.49%	222	1.63%
2016	11,014	77.16%	2,867	20.08%	394	2.76%
2020	13,587	78.09%	3,657	21.02%	155	0.89%
2024	15,352	80.08%	3,749	19.56%	70	0.37%

United States Senate election results for Polk County, Georgia2
Year	Republican		Democratic		Third party(ies)	
Year	No.	%	No.	%	No.	%
2020	13,282	77.06%	3,537	20.52%	416	2.41%
2020	11,546	77.75%	3,305	22.25%	0	0.00%

United States Senate election results for Polk County, Georgia3
Year	Republican		Democratic		Third party(ies)	
Year	No.	%	No.	%	No.	%
2020	6,942	40.75%	2,331	13.68%	7,762	45.57%
2020	11,525	77.61%	3,325	22.39%	0	0.00%
2022	10,426	76.87%	2,794	20.60%	343	2.53%
2022	9,506	79.37%	2,471	20.63%	0	0.00%

Georgia Gubernatorial election results for Polk County
Year	Republican		Democratic		Third party(ies)	
Year	No.	%	No.	%	No.	%
2022	11,117	81.50%	2,427	17.79%	96	0.70%

== See also ==
- National Register of Historic Places listings in Polk County, Georgia
- List of counties in Georgia
